= Windsor station (Michigan Central Railroad) =

Railway station in Ontario, Canada

Windsor, ON
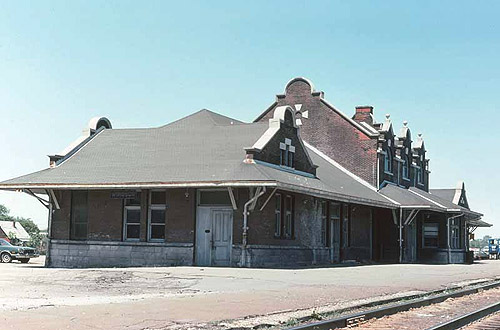
- Windsor in 1974

General information
- Location: 1300 Pelletier Street, Windsor, Ontario; Canada
- Coordinates: 42.301283°N 83.045022°W
- Owner: Canada Southern Railway
- Line: Canadian Pacific Railway
- Platforms: 1 island platform later 1 side platform
- Tracks: 2

Other information
- Status: Destroyed by fire (1996)

History
- Opened: 1911
- Closed: 1979

Former services
Preceding station	New York Central Railroad	Following station
Detroit toward Chicago	Michigan Central Railroad Main Line	Maidstone toward Buffalo
Preceding station	Canadian Pacific Railway	Following station
Detroit Terminus	Detroit – Montreal	Belle River toward Montreal Windsor
Preceding station	Amtrak	Following station
Detroit (Michigan Central) Terminus	Niagara Rainbow 1974–1979	St. Thomas toward New York (Grand Central)
Location

Windsor was a train station in Windsor, Ontario, Canada. The station was built by the Michigan Central Railroad in 1911 and subsequently controlled by the Canada Southern Railway. The station served Canada Southern Railway and New York Central trains. Windsor also has another railroad station in town.

Through most of its decades, and into the latter 1960s, the station served New York Central passenger trains over a New York–Buffalo–Windsor–Detroit–Jackson–Chicago route: the Empire State Express and the Wolverine. It also served trains bound for a slightly more northerly route east: to London, Toronto and Montreal: the New York Central-Canadian Pacific pooled train, the Canadian (later renamed the Canadian-Niagara).

The last train service to this station was Amtrak's Niagara Rainbow from October 1978 to January 31, 1979. The building was burnt to the ground in 1996 due to arson.
