= Michigan Central Railway Tunnel =

International railway tunnel in the US and Canada

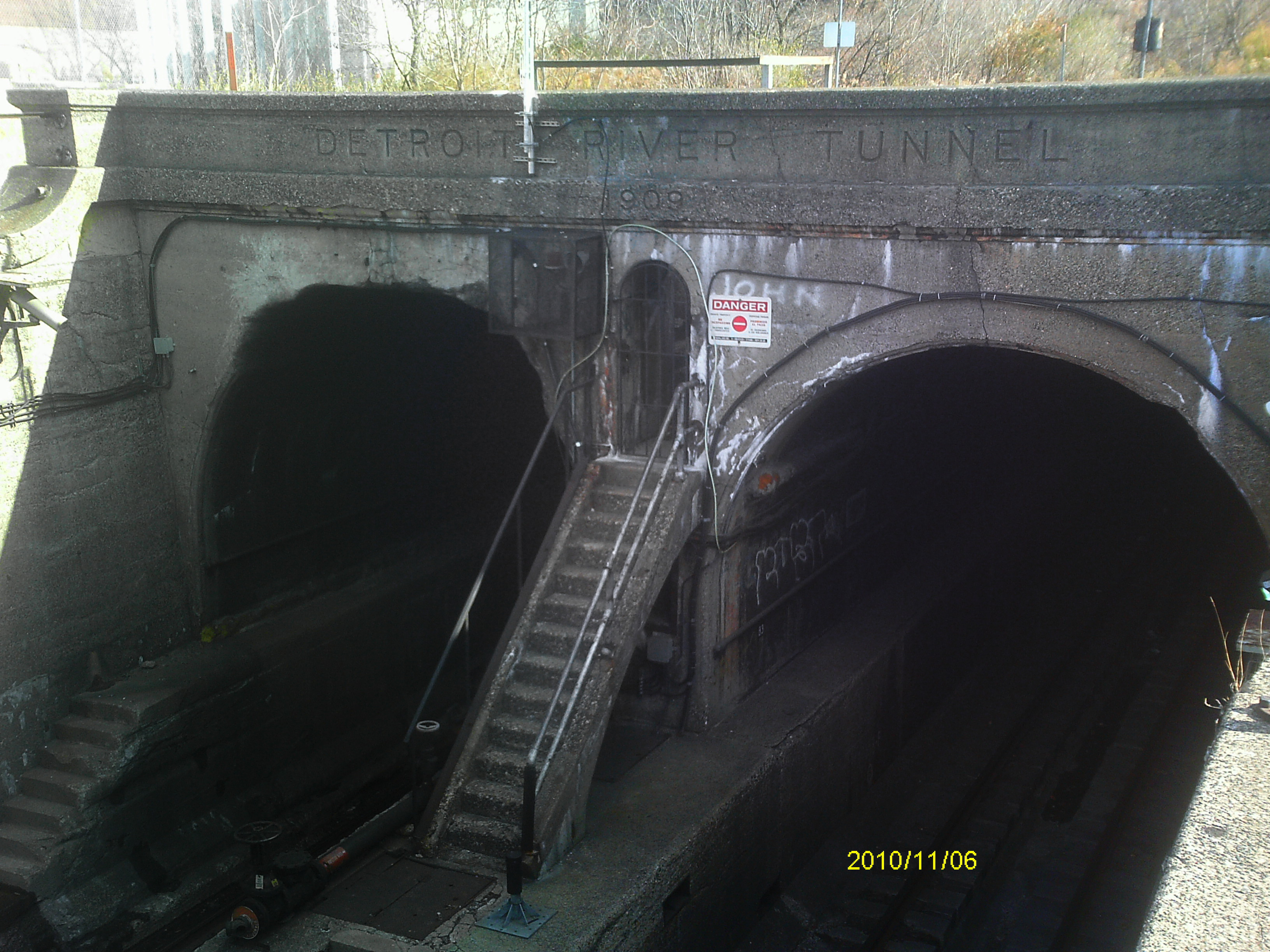
- The U.S. entrance of the Michigan Central Railway Tunnel in 2010
- Interactive map of Michigan Central Railway Tunnel

Overview
- Location: Detroit River
- Coordinates: 42.31849°N 83.06049°W
- System: CPKC Railway
- Start: Detroit, Michigan, US
- End: Windsor, Ontario, Canada

Operation
- Work began: October 1906
- Opened: July 26, 1910
- Owner: CPKC Railway
- Operator: Detroit River Tunnel Company
- Traffic: Freight

Technical
- Length: 2.6 km (1.6 mi)
- No. of tracks: 2
- Track gauge: 1,435 mm (4 ft 8 1/2 in) standard gauge
- Electrified: No

The Michigan Central Railway Tunnel is a railroad tunnel under the Detroit River connecting Detroit, Michigan, in the United States with Windsor, Ontario, in Canada. The U.S. entrance is south of Porter and Vermont streets near Rosa Parks Boulevard. The Canadian entrance is south of Wyandotte Street West between Cameron and Wellington Avenues. It was built by the Detroit River Tunnel Company for the Canada Southern Railway, leased by the Michigan Central Railroad and owned by the New York Central Railroad. The tunnel opened in 1910 and is still in use today by Canadian Pacific Kansas City.

== History ==
=== Background ===
Prior to the construction of the tunnel, the Canada Southern Railway had several connections to Michigan at its west end, all train ferries. The northern one ran across the St. Clair River, connecting to the St. Clair and Western Railroad. The southern connection crossed the Detroit River south of Detroit, connecting to the Canada Southern Bridge Company at Grosse Ile. Additionally a branch (usually considered the main line) split from the line to Grosse Ile at Essex, running to the Detroit River at Windsor.

In 1891, the Grand Trunk Railway opened the St. Clair Tunnel at Port Huron, giving it an advantage over the Canada Southern and its car ferries. The Detroit River Tunnel Company was formed August 15, 1905, as a merger of the Michigan and Canada Bridge and Tunnel Company (in Michigan) and the Canada and Michigan Bridge and Tunnel Company (in Ontario).

=== Construction ===
Construction began in October 1906 under the engineering supervision of the New York Central Railway's engineering vice president, William J. Wilgus. Dredging to construct the tunnel was performed in part by Dunbar & Sullivan, who used a steel dredge (Tipperary Boy) to carry out the work. The Michigan Central Railway Tunnel opened for passenger service July 26, 1910. Freight service began September 15 and on October 16 all traffic began running via the tunnel, ending the use of a train car ferry. From opening it was operated by the Michigan Central Railroad under lease of December 19, 1906. It was the first immersed tube tunnel to carry traffic.

On the east (Canadian) side, the tunnel connected to the line that had served a train ferry at Windsor. On the west (U.S.) side, the tunnel connected to the Michigan Central Railroad main line west of downtown (later abandoned east of the junction), and the Michigan Central Station was built west of the junction, opening in 1913.

=== Ownership changes ===
In 1968, the tunnel passed from the New York Central Railroad to Penn Central, and in 1976 to Conrail. In 1985, Conrail sold the tunnel to the Canadian National Railway (CN) and Canadian Pacific Railway (CP), with each getting a half share.

The north tube underwent a $27-million enlargement in 1993 to allow passage of certain types of modern rail cars such as those with stacked containers and auto carriers, which had been previously ferried across the Detroit River. However, the enlarged tunnel can still not accommodate the largest rail cars, such as those with stacked nine-foot-six-inch (2.90 m) "high-cube" shipping containers.

In early 2000, CN agreed to sell its stake to Borealis Transportation Infrastructure Trust (a venture of the Ontario Municipal Employees Retirement System) and use only the St. Clair Tunnel. CP and Borealis vested the tunnel into the new Detroit River Tunnel Partnership, and plans were announced to construct a new railway tunnel and convert the existing railway tunnel to a two-lane free flow truckway for transport trucks to alleviate pressure at the other nearby international border crossings (Ambassador Bridge, Detroit-Windsor Tunnel, and the Detroit-Windsor Truck Ferry). In June 2009, CP announced the sale part of its interest in the partnership, so that Borealis held 83.5% and CP held 16.5%.

In 2010, the Windsor Port Authority, Borealis Infrastructure, and CP announced plans to construct a new rail tunnel compatible with double-stacked trains. The initiative, called the Continental Rail Gateway, was scrapped in 2015, upon the approval of the proposed Gordie Howe International Bridge.

CP took full ownership of the tunnel in December 2020 following an approximate US$312-million deal with OMERS.

== Passenger service and revival plans ==
Passenger rail service between Detroit and Windsor, via the Michigan Central Railway Tunnel, operated regularly between 1910 and 1979. From 1910 to 1959 the Detroiter operated as a daily night train service between New York and Detroit via southern Ontario, crossing the border twice at Detroit–Windsor and Buffalo–Port Erie. The Wolverine, initially operated by New York Central Railroad, was also an international night train that twice crossed the Canada–United States border, traveling from New York City to Chicago. The Wolverine service first began in 1916 and ended in 1968 shortly after Penn Central Railroad. Between 1974 and 1979 Amtrak operated the Niagara Rainbow, which connected New York City and Detroit via Buffalo and southwestern Ontario. Since its closure no passenger trains have passed Detroit and Windsor via the Michigan Central Railway Tunnel.

Amidst its merger negotiations with the Kansas City Southern Railway, Canadian Pacific agreed in early 2022 that Amtrak would be allowed to access the tunnel for passenger service as part of the terms of the merger. This followed three years of efforts by Amtrak to restore Detroit–Toronto passenger rail service. In June 2026 a coalition of political leaders from Michigan and Ontario called on the Canadian government to restore passenger service between Detroit and Windsor. To facilitate the project, Canada will need to build a Canada Border Services Agency facility at Via Rail's Windsor station. Canadian National Railway stated that separate, dedicated passenger rail infrastructure should be developed rather than utilizing existing freight networks.

== Gallery ==
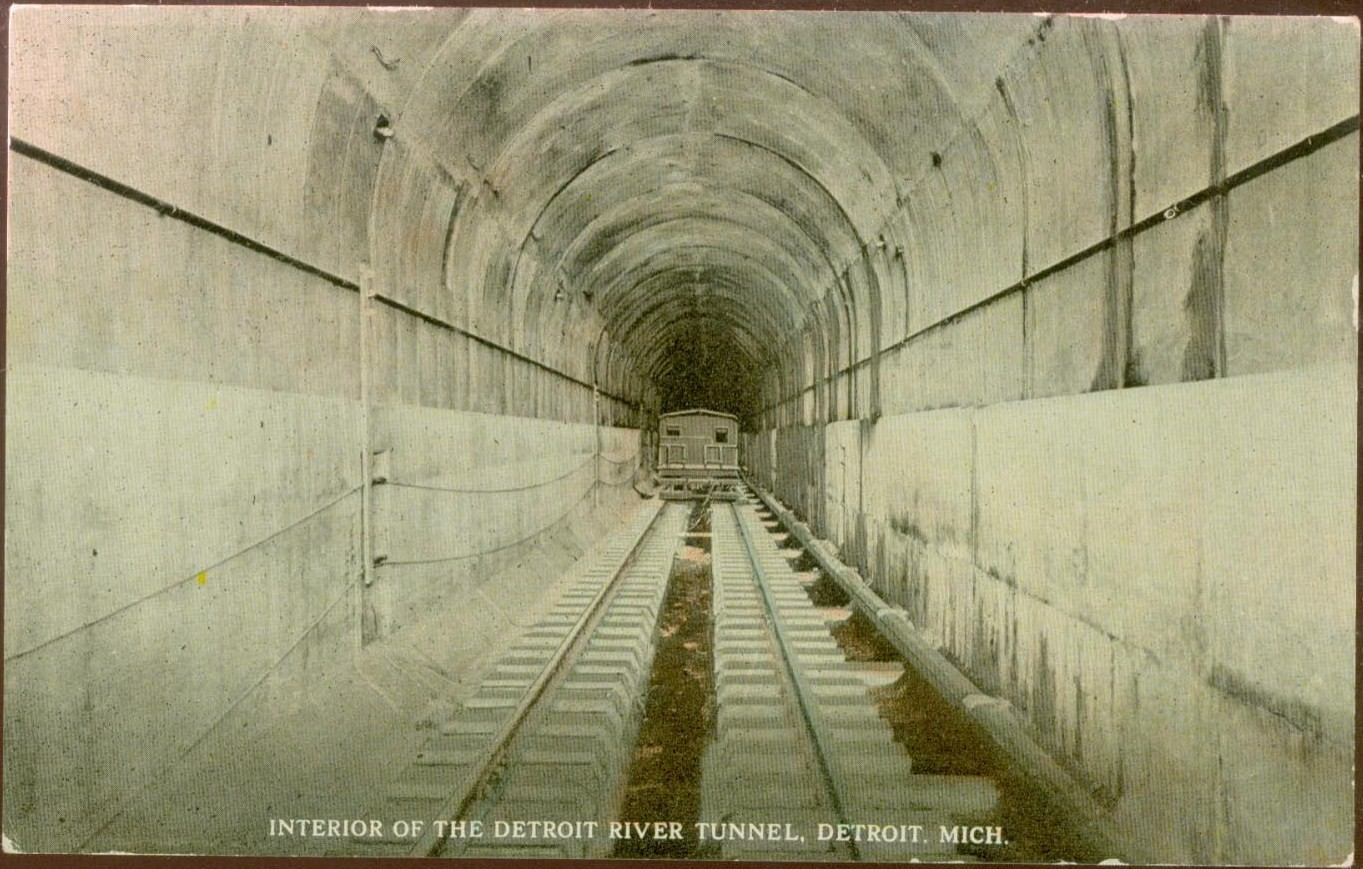
Postcard, early 1900s

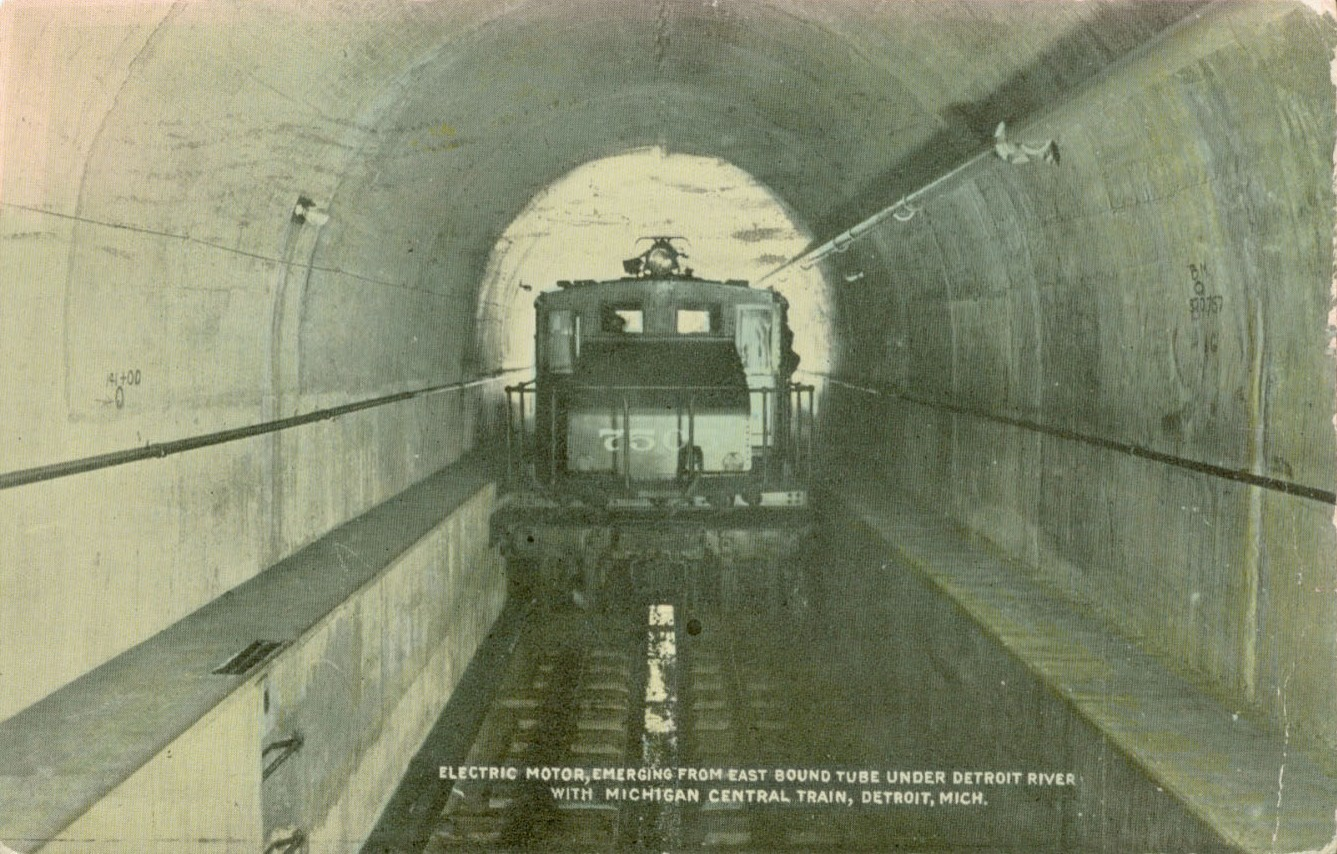
Postcard, 1911

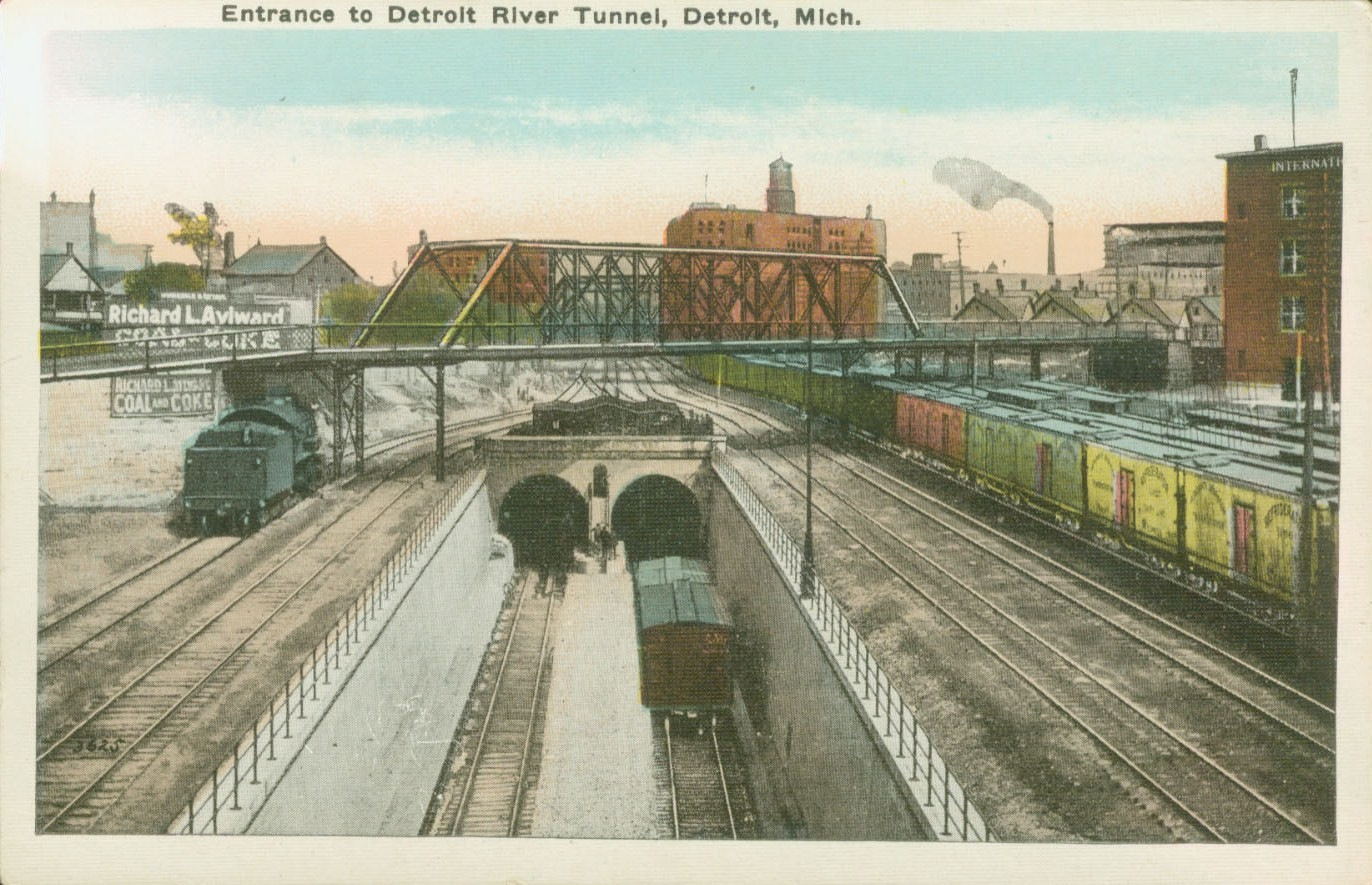
Postcard picture, early 1900s

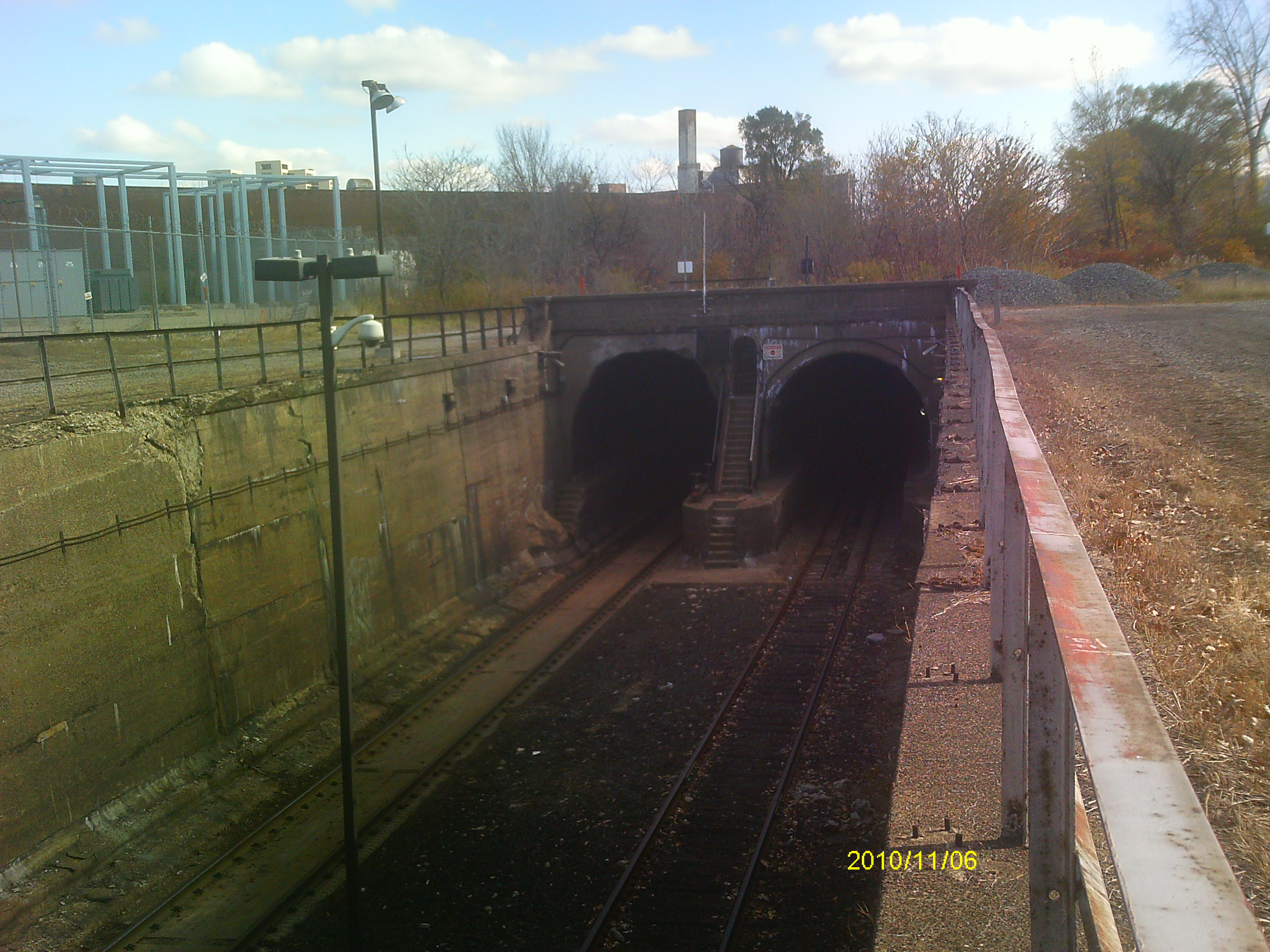
US entrance in November 2010

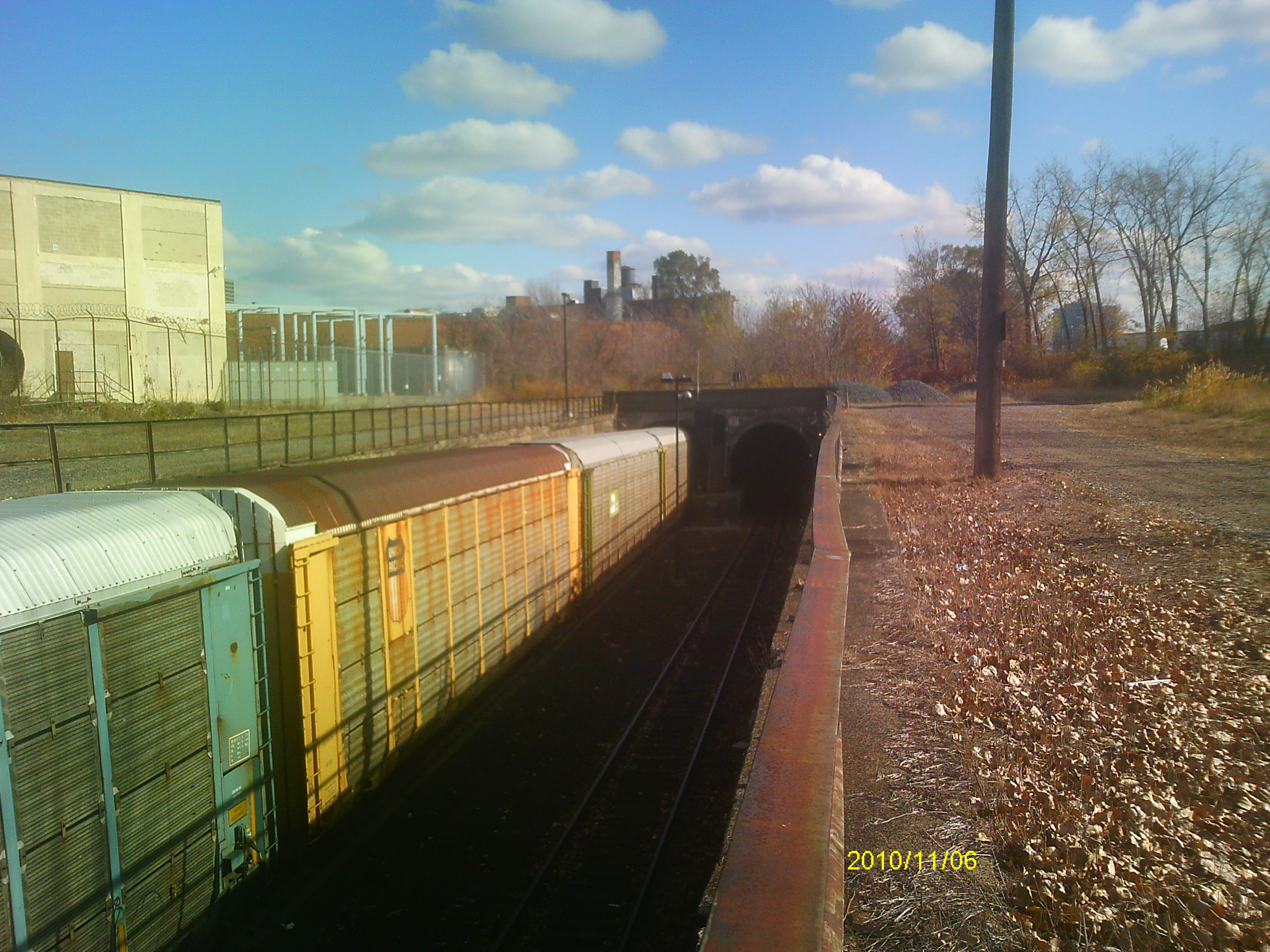
A train in the US entrance

== See also ==
- Detroit–Windsor Tunnel
- Ambassador Bridge
- Michigan Central Railway Bridge
