= Michigan Central Station =

Building, former station in Detroit, Michigan, US

- Exterior view in 2026

General information
- Location: 2405 West Vernor Highway, Detroit, Michigan; United States
- Coordinates: 42°19′43.69″N 083°04′39.83″W
- Owner: Ford Motor Company
- Platforms: 10 island (historically)
- Connections: DDOT 1, 2 SMART FAST Michigan 261

Other information
- Status: Open
- Station code: Amtrak code: DET

History
- Opened: January 4, 1914; 112 years ago
- Closed: January 6, 1988
- Rebuilt: 2024

Former services
Preceding station	Amtrak	Following station
Dearborn toward Chicago	Twilight Limited	Terminus
Dearborn toward Chicago	Wolverine	Terminus
Terminus	Niagara Rainbow	Windsor toward New York (Grand Central)
Dearborn toward Chicago	Lake Cities	Toledo Terminus
Dearborn toward Jackson	Michigan Executive	Terminus
Preceding station	Baltimore and Ohio Railroad	Following station
Monroe toward Cincinnati	Toledo Division	Terminus
Preceding station	Canadian Pacific Railway	Following station
Terminus	Detroit – Montreal	Windsor toward Montreal Windsor
Preceding station	Detroit, Toledo and Ironton Railroad	Following station
Terminus	Main Line before 1920s	Delray toward Ironton
Preceding station	New York Central Railroad	Following station
Dearborn toward Chicago	Michigan Central Railroad Main Line	Windsor toward Buffalo
Woodward Avenue toward Mackinaw City	Mackinaw City – Detroit	Terminus
Terminus	Detroit Branch	Delray toward Toledo
Proposed services (late 2028)
Preceding station	Amtrak	Following station
Dearborn toward Chicago	Wolverine	Windsor Terminus
- Michigan Central Station
- U.S. National Register of Historic Places
- Area: 500,000 sq ft (46,000 m^{2})
- Built: June 1912 – December 1913
- Architects: Reed and Stem, Warren and Wetmore
- Architectural style: Beaux-Arts
- Website: michigancentral.com
- NRHP reference No.: 75000969
- Added to NRHP: April 16, 1975
Location
- Location within Michigan

Michigan Central Station (MCS, also known as Michigan Central Depot) is the historic former main intercity passenger rail station in Detroit, Michigan, United States. Built for the Michigan Central Railroad, it replaced the original depot in downtown Detroit, which had been shuttered after a major fire on December 26, 1913, forcing the still unfinished station into early service. Formally dedicated on January 4, 1914, the station remained open for business until January 6, 1988, when Amtrak service was relocated. The station building consisted of a train depot and a 230-foot (70 m) office tower with thirteen stories above two mezzanine levels. The tallest rail station in the world at the time of its construction, the Beaux-Arts style architecture was designed by architects who had previously worked on Grand Central Terminal in New York City.

The building is in the Corktown district of Detroit near the Ambassador Bridge, approximately 3/4 mi (1.2 km) southwest of downtown Detroit. It is located behind Roosevelt Park, and the Roosevelt Warehouse is adjacent to the east, with a tunnel connection to the MCS. The city's Roosevelt Park serves as a grand entryway to the station. To the southeast is the Bagley Mobility Hub and the Southwest Greenway, which connects to the Ralph C. Wilson, Jr. Centennial Park on the Detroit Riverfront. It was added to the National Register of Historic Places in 1975.

Images of the building's deterioration remain a premier example of ruins photography. Its derelict state became symbolic of Detroit's decline from a once-prosperous city.

Various parties started negotiating renovation plans in 2011, and in May 2018, Ford Motor Company purchased the building for $90 million for redevelopment into a mixed use facility as cornerstone of the company's new Corktown campus. After years of extensive exterior and interior renovation, exceeding $900 million, the station reopened on June 6, 2024. The restored station was hailed by a rail industry publication as "...a stunning example of what can be accomplished with historical vision, ample financing, and advanced construction and restoration technology."

== History ==
=== As an active station ===
The building began operating as Detroit's main passenger depot in 1913 after the older Michigan Central Station burned on December 26, 1913. It was owned and operated by Michigan Central Railroad and was planned as part of a large project that included the Michigan Central Railway Tunnel below the Detroit River for freight and passengers. The former station's location on a spur line was inconvenient for the high volume of passengers it served. The new station placed passenger service on the main line.

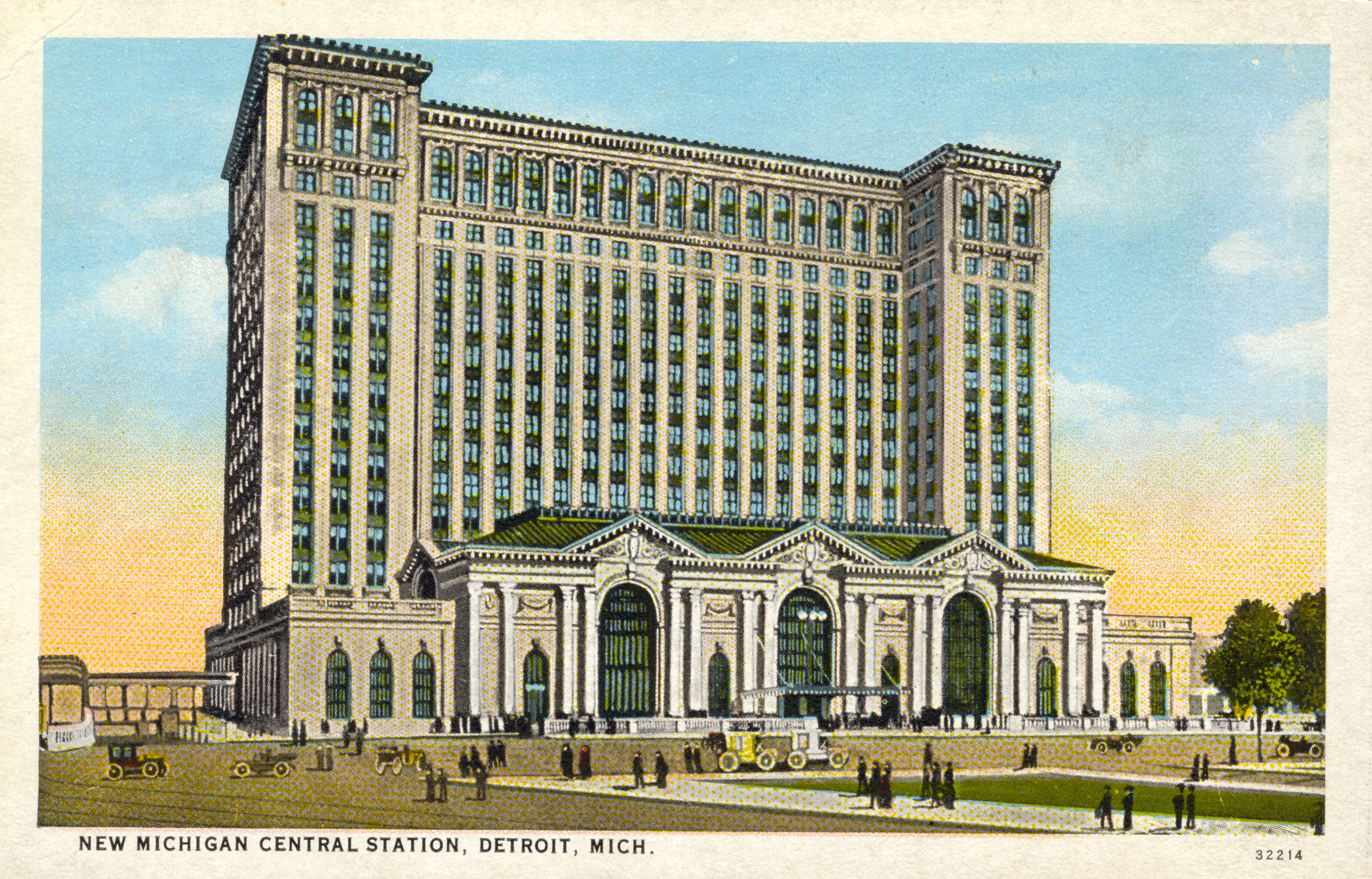
Postcard of the Michigan Central Station (c. 1914)

The growing trend toward increased automobile use was not a large concern in 1912, as is evident in the design of the building. Most passengers would arrive at and leave from Michigan Central Station by interurban service or streetcar, due to the station's distance from downtown Detroit. The station had been placed away from downtown in order to stimulate related development that came in its direction. An ambitious project to connect the station to the Cultural Center via a wide boulevard was never realized. Nonetheless, the station remained active for several decades. Trains of the New York Central Railroad (the company that had acquired the Michigan Central), the Baltimore and Ohio Railroad and the Canadian Pacific Railway operated from the station.

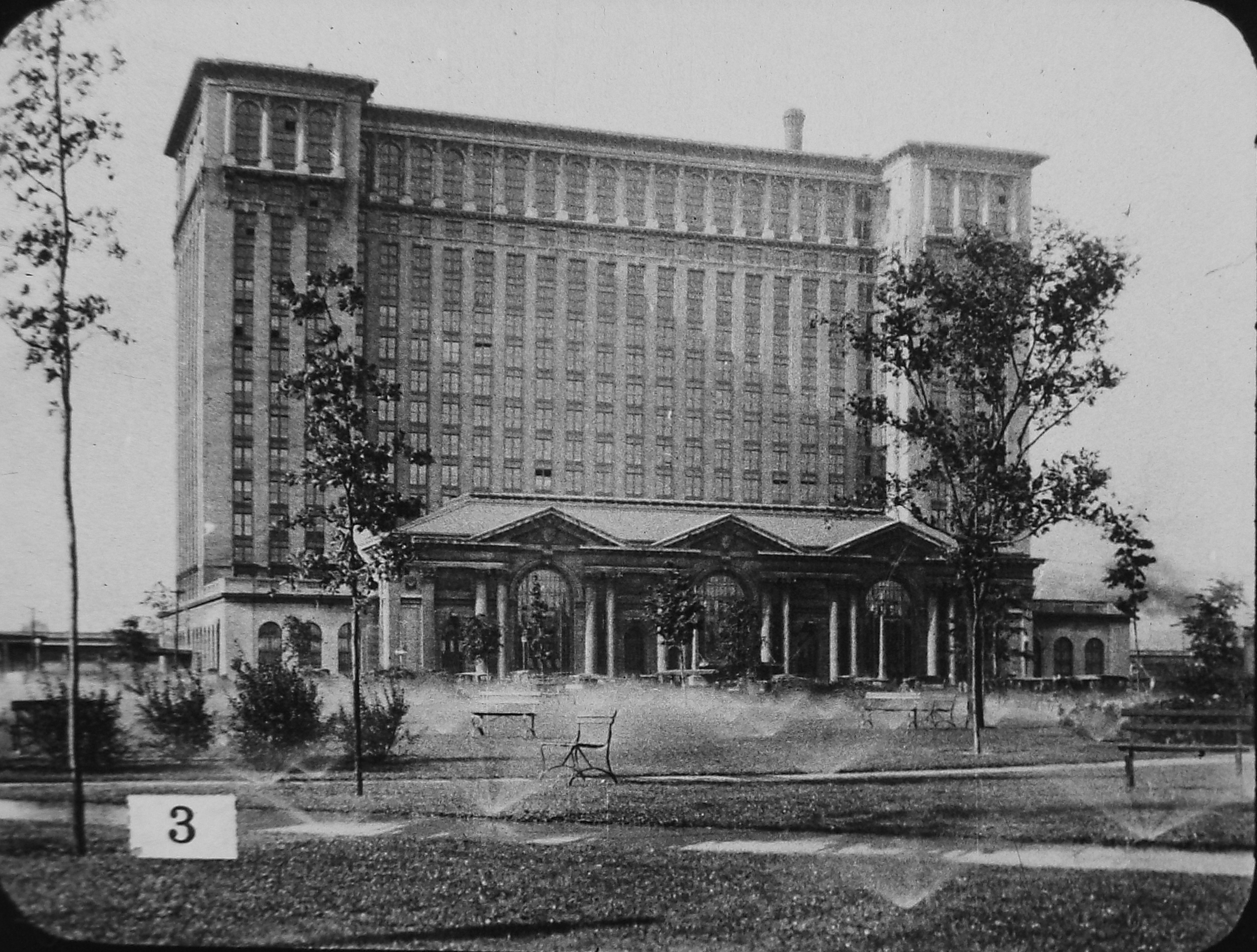
Michigan Central Station in the 1920s from the filmstrip DETROIT, S.V.E. series Important Cities of the U.S.

At the beginning of World War I, the peak of rail travel in the United States, more than 200 trains left the station each day and lines would stretch from the boarding gates to the main entrance. In the 1940s, more than 4,000 passengers a day used the station and more than 3,000 people worked in its office tower. Among notable passengers arriving at MCS were Presidents Herbert Hoover, Harry S. Truman and Franklin D. Roosevelt, actor Charlie Chaplin, inventor Thomas Edison and artists Frida Kahlo and Diego Rivera. The other major station of Detroit was the Fort Street Union Depot.

In the 1920s Henry Ford began to buy land near the station and made construction plans, but the Great Depression and other circumstances squelched this and many other development efforts. The original design had not provided a large parking facility, so when the interurban service was discontinued less than two decades after MCS opened, it was effectively isolated from the large majority of the population who drove cars and needed parking to use the facility.

==== Named trains ====
Major trains and destinations included:

- Baltimore & Ohio
  - Ambassador to New York City (Jersey City CNJ terminal) via Pittsburgh, PA and Washington, D.C.
  - Shenandoah, route as above
  - Cincinnatian, to Cincinnati via Toledo and Dayton
  - Great Lakes Limited, to Louisville via Toledo, Dayton and Cincinnati
- New York Central
  - Canadian, to Montreal and later, Canadian-Niagara from Chicago in the west, to Buffalo and Toronto in the east (with Canadian Pacific carrying from Detroit to Toronto)
  - Dominion-Overseas, to Montreal
  - Chicago Mercury, to Chicago
  - Cleveland Mercury, to Cleveland
  - Detroiter, to New York City
  - Empire State Express, to New York City
  - Mercury, Chicago to the west, Cleveland to the east
  - New York Special, Chicago to the west, to New York City to the east, via Southwestern Ontario
  - North Shore Limited (westbound only), to Chicago to the west, from Toronto (pooled with Canadian Pacific's Chicago Express) and New York City in the east
  - Northerner, to Mackinaw City, Michigan via Bay City, Michigan
  - Ohio Special (northbound: Michigan Special), to Cincinnati via Toledo and Dayton
  - Queen City, to Cincinnati via Toledo and Dayton
  - Timberliner, to Mackinaw City, Michigan via Bay City, Michigan
  - Twilight Limited, to Chicago
  - Wolverine, Chicago to New York City via Southwestern Ontario

=== Decline and abandonment ===
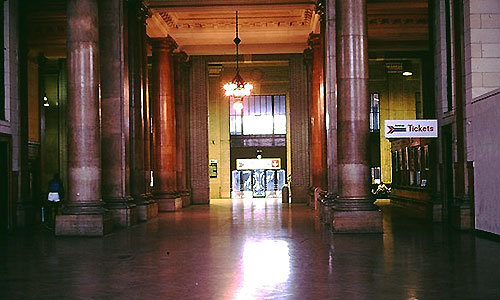
The interior of Michigan Central Station, August 1980.

Passenger volume did not decrease immediately. During World War II, the station was used heavily by military troops. After the war, with a growth in automobile ownership people used trains less frequently for vacation or other travel. Service was reduced and passenger traffic became so low that the New York Central attempted to sell the facility in 1956 for US$5 million, one-third of its original 1913 building cost. Another attempted sale in 1963 failed for lack of buyers. In 1967, maintenance costs were seen as too high relative to the decreasing passenger volume. The restaurant, arcade shops, and main entrance were closed, along with much of the main waiting room. This left only two ticket windows to serve passengers and visitors, who used the same parking-lot entrance as railroad employees working in the building.

Meanwhile, service to various destinations was curtailed. By 1960 the New York Central ended its direct service south to Toledo, on its own timetable yielding that responsibility to the B&O. In 1963 the B&O moved its trains over to the Fort Street Union Depot. The New York Central ended the last of its trains bound north for Bay City in 1964. The pooled New York Central/Central Pacific trains were discontinued and the Canadian Pacific trains to Windsor ended in 1967; and the New York Central ended its named trains by the close of 1967. Any remaining New York Central trains were segmented operations between major cities. The trains run by the NYC's successor in 1968, the Penn Central continued the segmented operations at the station.

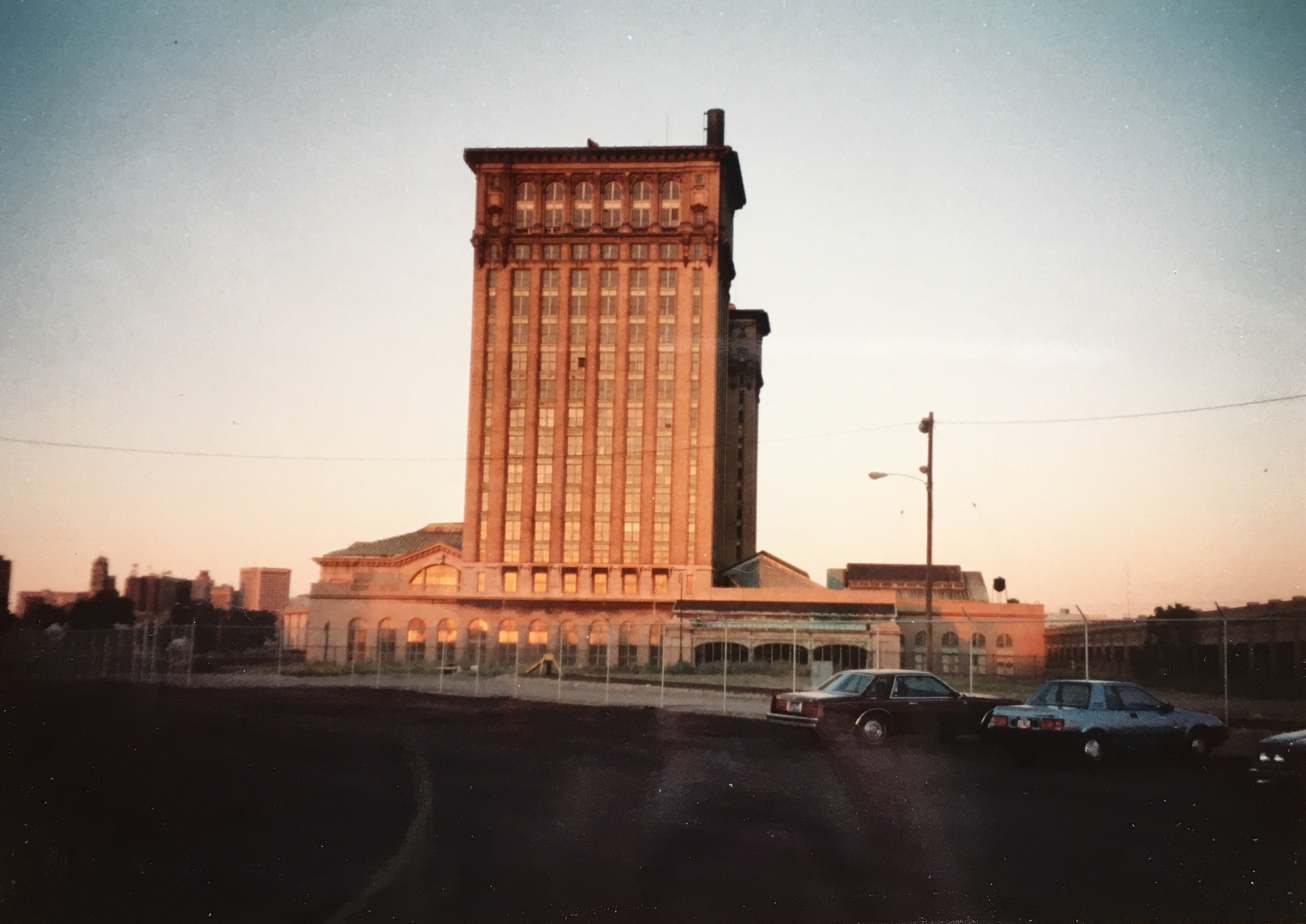
Michigan Central Station 1988

Amtrak assumed operation of the nation's passenger rail service in 1971, reopening the main waiting room and entrance in 1975. It started a $1.25 million renovation project in 1978. Six years later, the building was sold for a transportation center project that never materialized. On January 6, 1988, the last Amtrak train pulled away from the station after owners decided to close the facility. Amtrak service continued at a platform on Rose Street near the former station building until the new Detroit station opened several miles away in New Center in 1994. In July 1992, the Detroit Master Plan of Policies for the southwest sector's urban design identified the station as an attractive or interesting feature to be recognized, enhanced and promoted.

=== Moroun ownership ===
Controlled Terminals Inc. acquired the station in 1996. Its sister company, the Detroit International Bridge Co., owns the nearby Ambassador Bridge and both are part of a group of transportation-related companies which were owned by late businessman Manuel Moroun, Chairman and CEO of CenTra Inc. The company demolished the train shed in 2000, and converted the remaining tracks and platforms into an intermodal freight facility, named "Expressway" and operated by Canadian Pacific Railway. This facility was closed in June 2004.

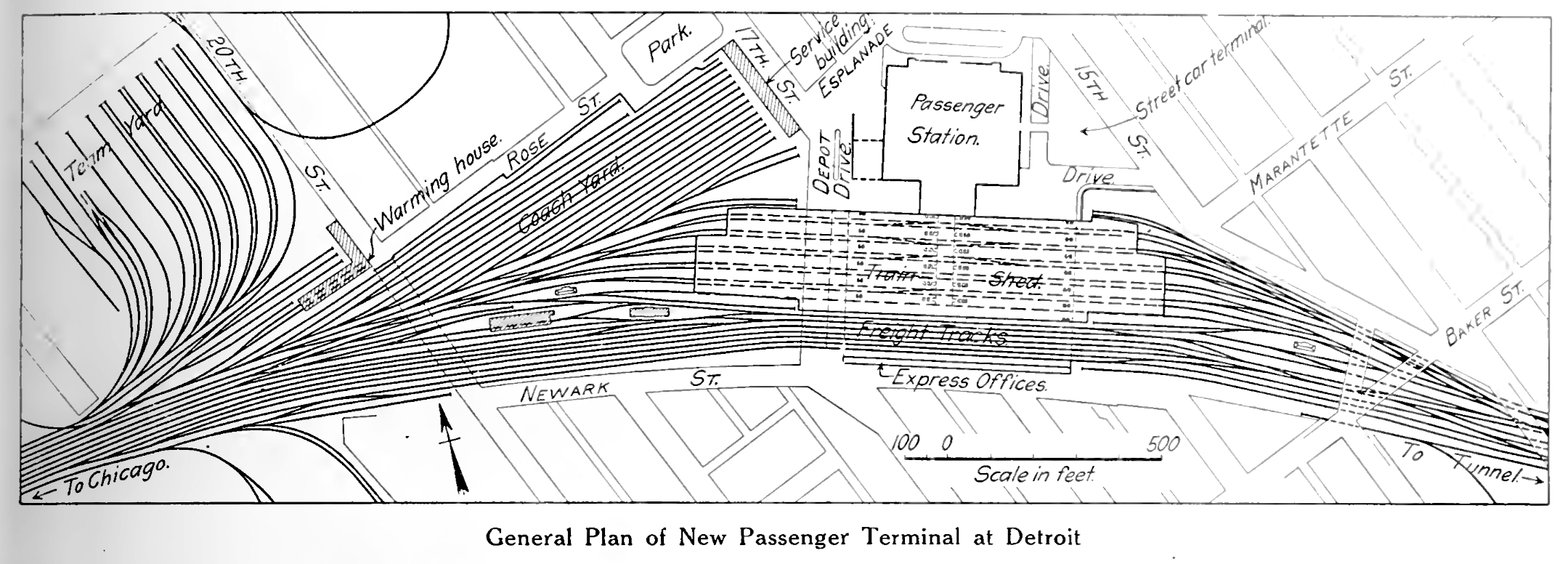
MCRR Terminal track diagram (1914)

In 2004, Detroit mayor Kwame Kilpatrick announced that the city was pursuing options to relocate its Detroit Police Department headquarters and possibly consolidate other law enforcement offices to MCS. However, in mid-2005, the city canceled the plan and chose to renovate its existing headquarters. In 2006 it was proposed that the station be redeveloped into a Trade Processing Center adapting the station as a customs and international trade processing center due to its proximity to the Ambassador Bridge. Although the City of Detroit considered the building a "Priority Cultural Site" in 2006, the City Council on April 7, 2009, passed a resolution to demolish the structure. Seven days later, Detroit resident Stanley Christmas sued the city of Detroit to stop the demolition effort, citing the National Historic Preservation Act of 1966.

In 2008, the station owners said that their goal was to renovate the decaying building. The estimated cost of renovations was $80 million, but the owners viewed finding the right use as a greater problem than financing. Moroun proposed making the station into a convention center and casino. Such a project would have cost $1.2 billion, including $300 million to restore the station. Dan Stamper, president of Detroit International Bridge, noted that the station should have been used as one of the city's casinos. In 2010, State Senator Cameron S. Brown and Mickey Bashfield, a government relations official for the building owner CenTra Inc., suggested that the station could become the Detroit headquarters of the Michigan State Police, include some United States Department of Homeland Security offices, and serve as a center for trade inspections. The development never came to fruition.

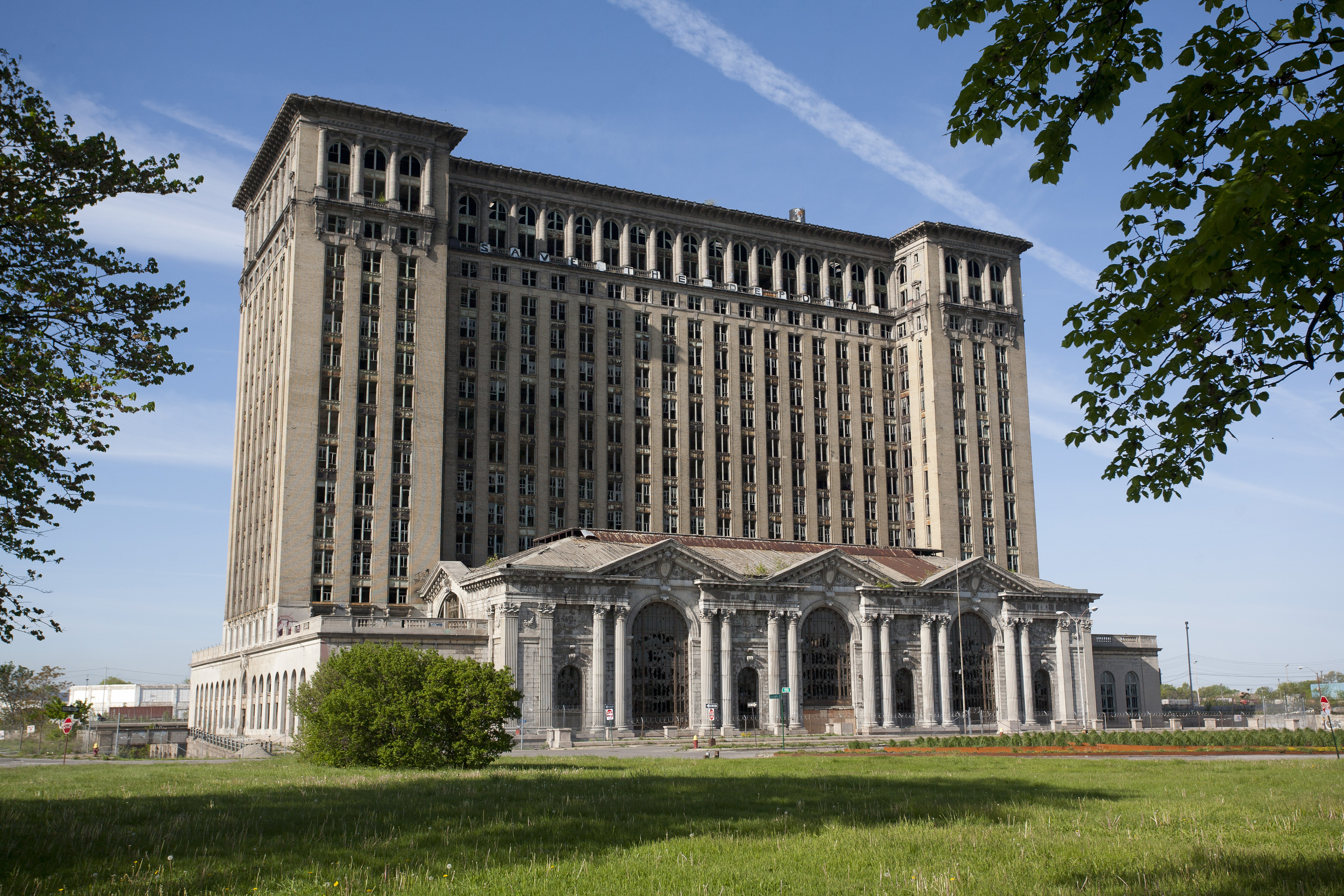
Before window re-installation (2010)

On March 25, 2011, in an effort to push forward a potential sale and redevelopment, Dan Stamper, spokesperson for Moroun, announced plans to work with the City of Detroit on funding replacement of the tower's roof, and installing new windows on the structure. Stamper told The Detroit News: "It would be much easier to help a developer to come up with a package to use the depot if some improvements were made." In June 2011, work began on partial asbestos abatement on the first floor; other work conducted included interior demolition work, removal of broken glass from first floor windows, and removal of water. In June 2012, electricity was restored to the interior. Lights then illuminated the main lobby.

On May 5, 2011, the Detroit International Bridge Company announced it engaged the Ann Arbor firm of Quinn Evans on behalf of the Moroun family that owned the building to oversee restoration of the roof and windows of the structure. Bridge Company owner Moroun stated, "We hope this is just the beginning of a renaissance for the depot." The once flooded basement was largely drained, with about 4 inches (10 cm) of water at its highest still remaining in a sub-basement of the building.

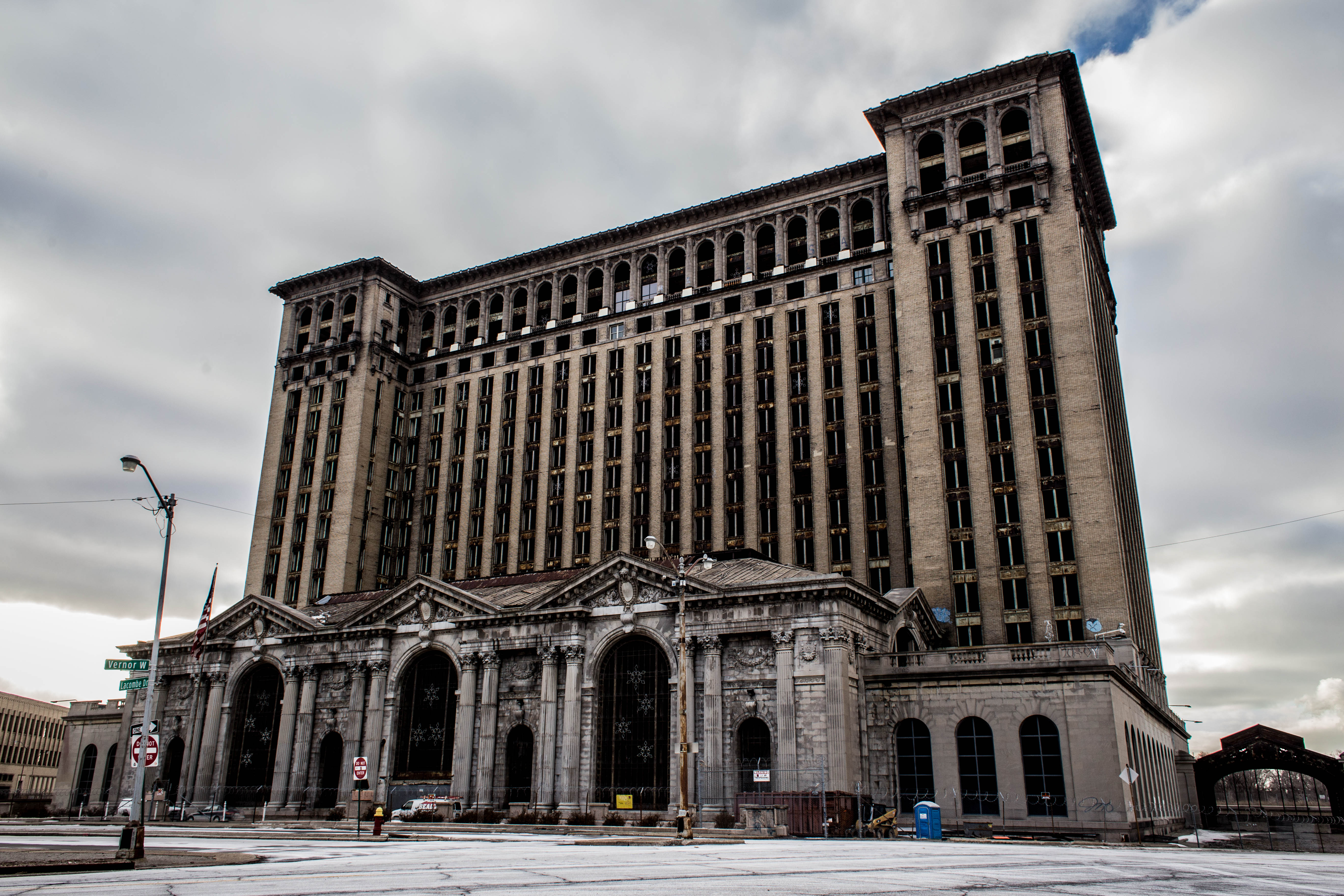
Michigan Central Station exterior in 2013.

On June 10, 2014, it was reported that the owners of Michigan Central Station were moving forward with about $676,000 in rehab work, and had received permits to install a new 9,000-pound capacity freight elevator, which will allow for the smooth installation of new windows and roof work. In late 2014 work to install the elevator began.

In February 2015, the owners announced that they would replace more than 1,000 windows above the first level. In late April the city announced a land swap deal with the Bridge Company to transfer a 3-acre strip of Riverside Park near the Ambassador Bridge for 4.8 acres of adjacent property owned by the Bridge Company. As part of that agreement, the city would receive up to $5 million for park improvements, and the Bridge Company agreed to replace the windows in the train station. In July the Detroit City Council approved the land transfer. By December 2015, all of the new windows were installed.

By August 2016 the Moroun family had spent 10 years and $12 million on electricity, windows, and the elevator shaft, to revitalize the building. Matthew Moroun considered putting part of his family's operations in the 18-story Corktown building. In September 2017 the "Detroit Homecoming" event was held in the station, the first legal event to occur there since the building's closure in 1988.

=== Ford ownership ===
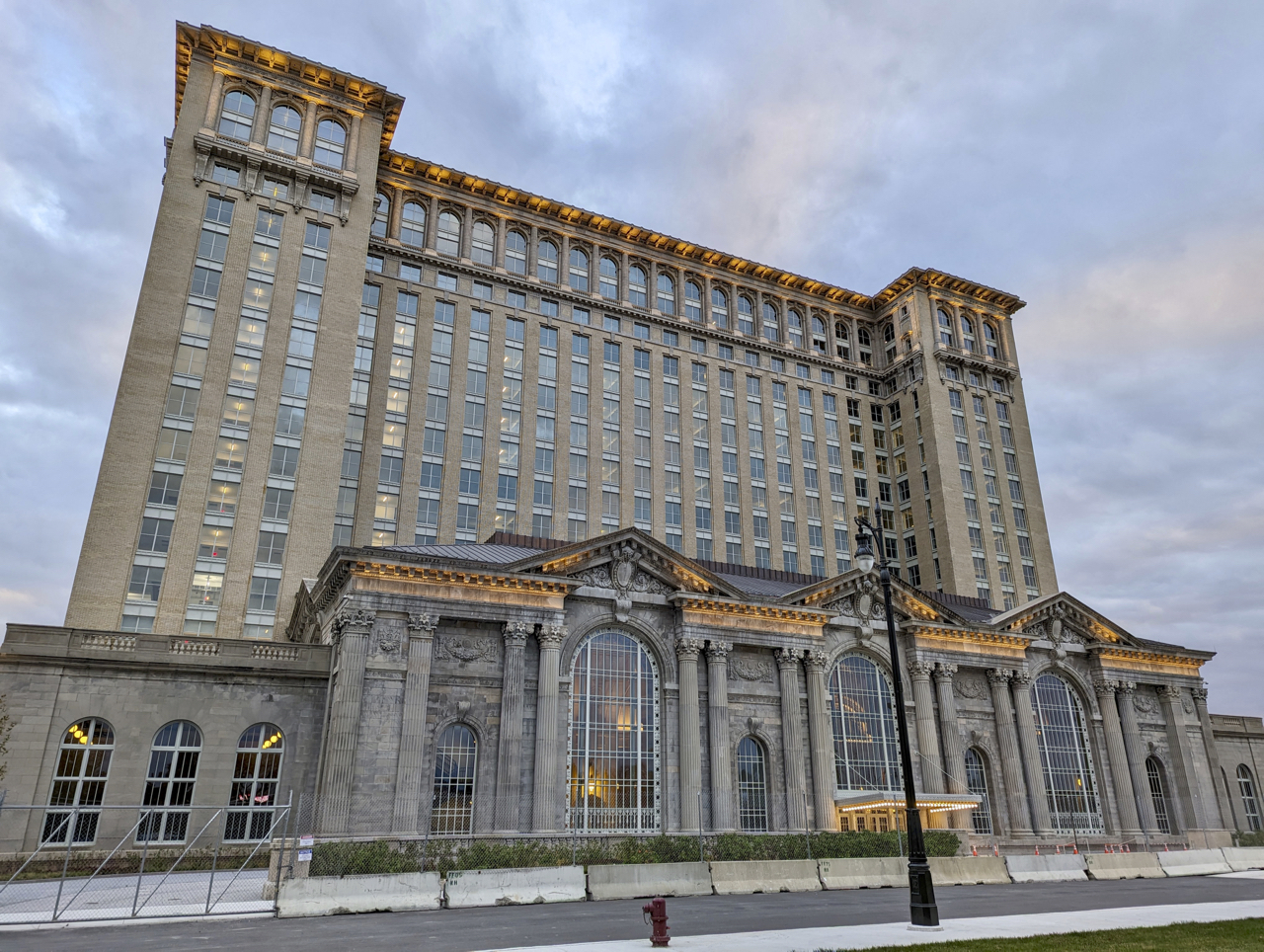
The exterior of the restored Michigan Central Station in November 2023.

On March 20, 2018, The Detroit News published an article noting the Ford Motor Company was in talks to buy the structure. On May 22, 2018, ownership of the building was transferred from the Moroun-owned MCS Crown Land Development Co. LLC to New Investment Properties I LLC. Ford's representatives neither confirmed nor denied if this ownership exchange was made by them.

The Moroun family confirmed on June 11, 2018, that Ford was the new owner of the building. Ford purchased the station along with the Roosevelt Warehouse. Ford planned to turn the building into a hub for its autonomous vehicle development and deployment, and as an anchor for the company's Corktown campus. The building would hold both Ford offices and offices of suppliers and partner companies. The first floor concourse would reopen to the public with restaurants and retail. Housing will also be created on the top floors. Restoration and renovations were then anticipated to be completed by 2022.

On June 19, 2018, Ford held a community celebration, in which local rapper Big Sean performed, and the building was opened to the public for the first time since its closure in the 1980s. According to local Detroit media outlets, Ford planned to renovate the station, the warehouse next door, and complete construction on the rest of its campus within four years, and is part of the company's $1 billion capital improvements project, which also included the creation of a development on the West side of Dearborn, Michigan, as well as a renovation of the company's main headquarters in Dearborn. As part of that $1 billion, Ford Land was seeking at least $250 million in tax and other incentives, and claimed that the project would not be financially feasible without the support of incentives.

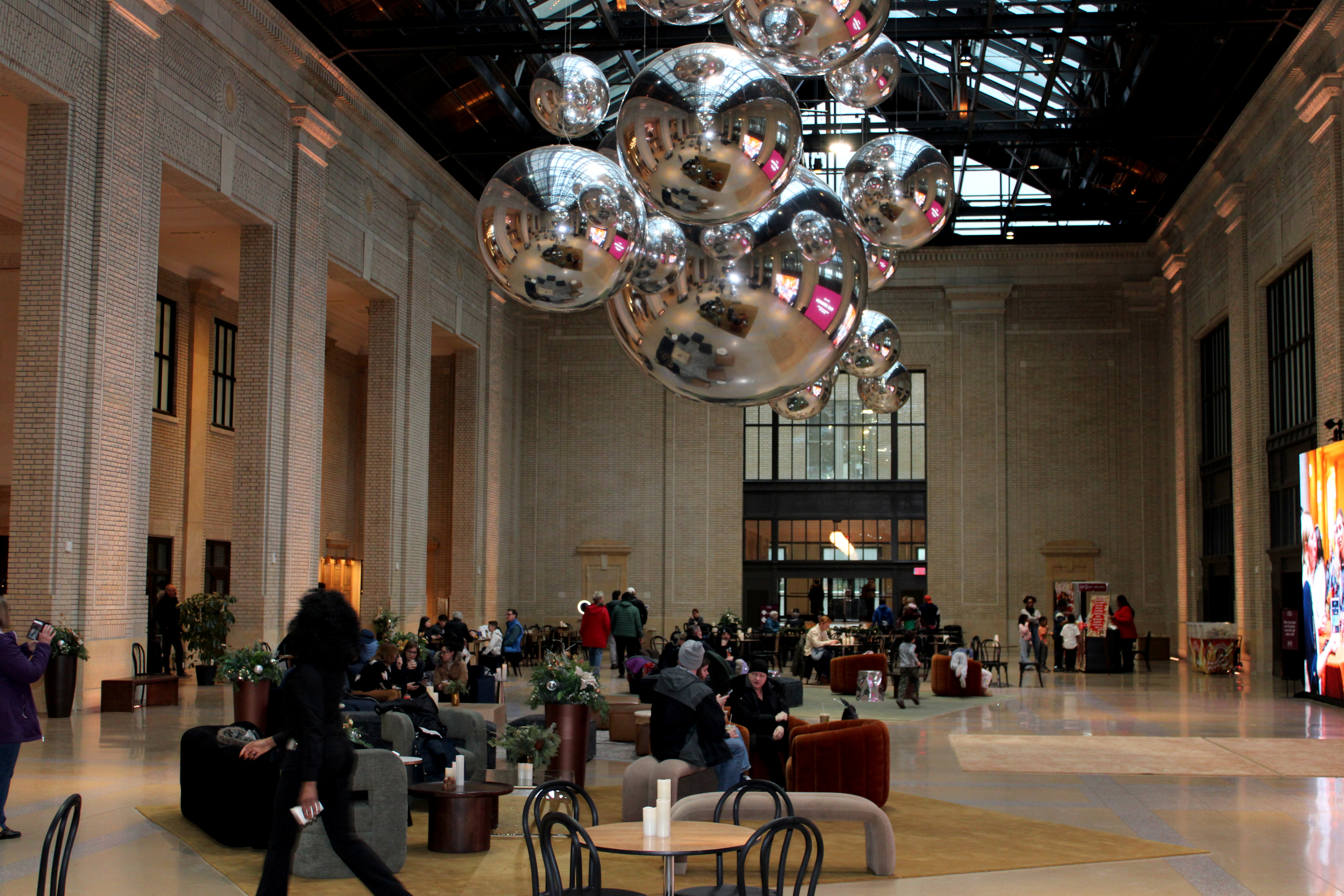
Interior of Michigan Central Station in Dec. 2025

In December 2018 Ford began Phase I of the building restoration. The work involved drying out the building and reinforcement of structural columns and archways. Phase II began in May 2019 and consisted of masonry restoration of the tower and concourse, retiling of the ceiling of the waiting room, and repair of the structural steel. The efforts to restore the building required some 1.7 million labor hours to restore 29,000 Gustavino tiles in the Grand Hall, 8 million bricks & 23,000 square feet of marble flooring throughout the building, and 8.6 million miles of new grout was laid across the Grand Hall ceiling. In addition, some 3.5 million gallons of water had to be removed from the basement of the building prior to restoration work starting. 3-D scanning technology was used to recreate architectural details lost to exposure and vandalism. Restoration work on the building's masonry facade began in 2021. Work was supposed to be completed in 2022 but was delayed due to the COVID-19 pandemic in Michigan. The station reopened to the public on June 6, 2024. As part of its grand reopening, tickets for a free concert featuring Detroit performers were made available and sold out within five minutes.

Much of the passenger train infrastructure was demolished either after the 1988 cession of Amtrak service or during the renovation. In late 2023 Amtrak and VIA Rail Canada were studying the feasibility of connecting one Chicago-Detroit train to a Windsor-Toronto round trip. However the track arrangement at the current Amtrak Detroit station would require a time consuming and cumbersome backup move. Moving the connection to Michigan Central would simplify this operation. While there is space near the existing CPKC main line for a platform, the renovations no longer allow access from the rear of Michigan Central. A separate Amtrak building would be needed. In October 2025 an agreement was reached with the Michigan Central corporation, the state Department of Transportation, and the city to develop an multimodal facility just west of the station building. The timeline for environmental review, development, and construction is projected for an opening by the end of 2028.

In June 2025 Ford announced that NoMad, a luxury brand within the Hilton chain, will build 180 units (including 30 suites) on the 14th through 18th floors. The ground floor would also include a bar, lounge, and restaurant for the hotel, while the third floor would be converted to a "wellness" area. The hotel is anticipated to open in 2027.

== Architecture ==
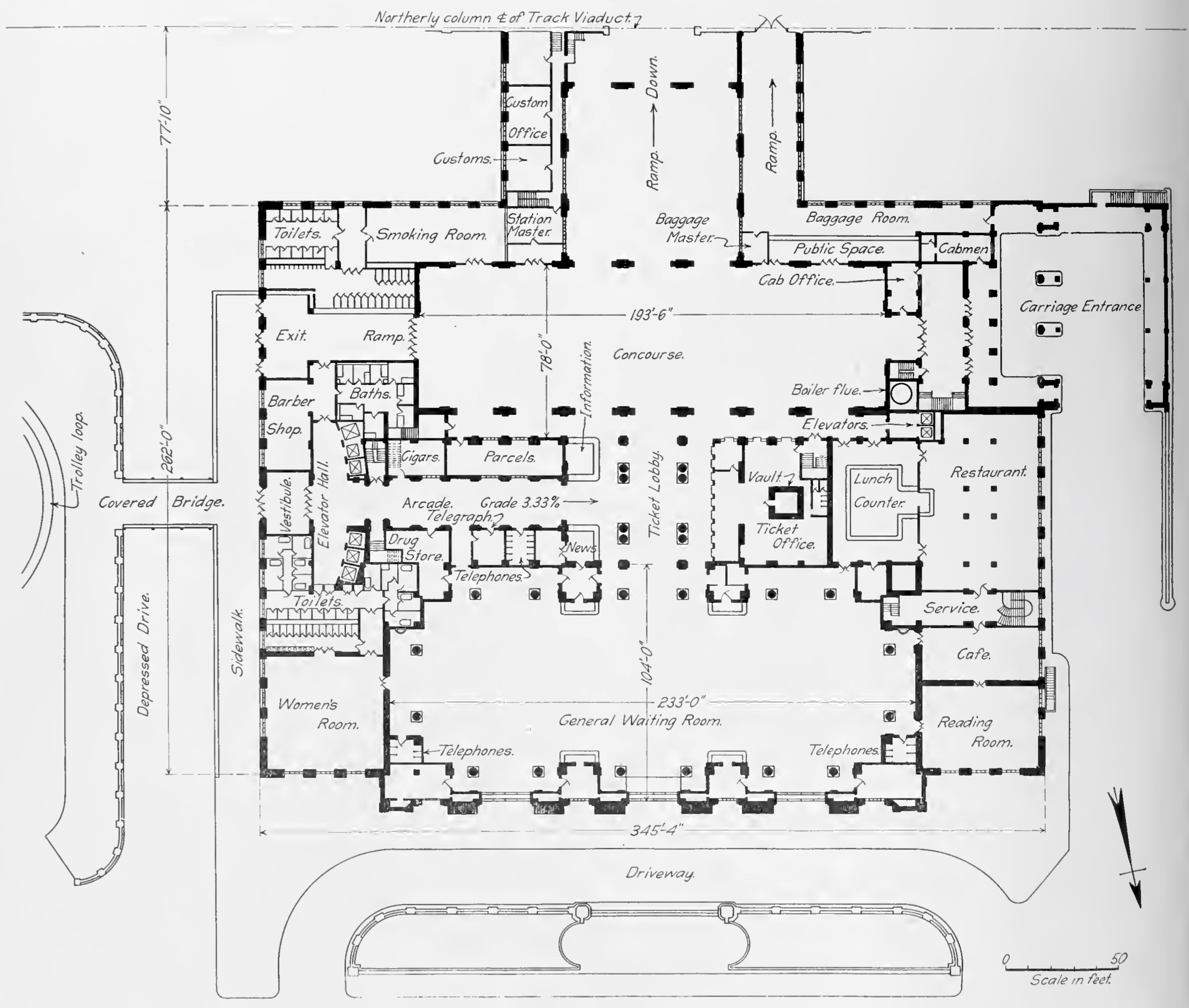
Floor plan

The building was designed in the Beaux-Arts Classical style by Warren & Wetmore and Reed and Stem; these firms had also designed New York City's Grand Central Terminal. Michigan Central was designed at the same time, and is seen as a spiritual twin to Grand Central in New York, as both were meant as flagship stations on Vanderbilt's rail lines, both were designed to have office towers in their original design concepts (though Grand Central's tower was never built), both have the same detailing, and were opened six months apart. The price tag for this 500,000-square-foot (46,000 m^{2}) building was $15 million when it was built. Roosevelt Park creates a grand entryway for the station, which was fully realized around 1920.

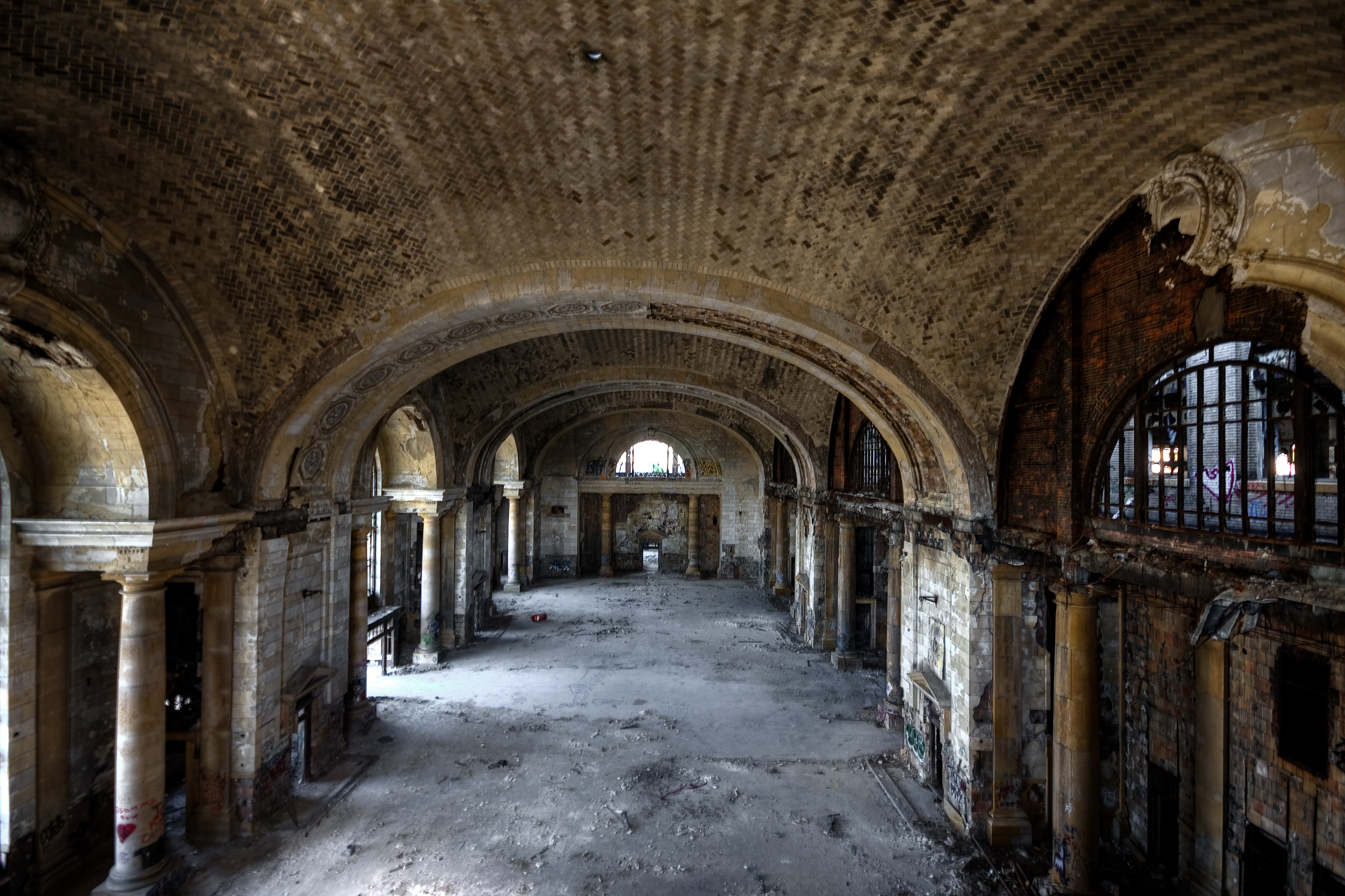
Waiting room, 2009

The building is composed of two distinct parts: the train station and the 18-story office tower. The roof height is 230 feet (70 m). The original plan for the tower included a hotel, offices for the rail company, or a combination of both. The tower was used only for office space by the Michigan Central Railroad and subsequent owners of the building. The tower was never completely used; the top floors were never completely furnished, and served no function.

The main waiting room on the main floor was modeled after an ancient Roman bathhouse, with walls of marble and vaulted ceilings. The building also housed a large hall adorned with Doric columns that housed the ticket office and arcade shops. Beyond the arcade was the concourse, which had brick walls and a large copper skylight. From here, passengers would walk down a ramp to a tunnel from which the platforms could be accessed by stairs and elevators. Under the shed there were ten passenger platforms consisting of one side platform and five island platforms along ten paired tracks. In addition, one track served the Railway Express Agency (REA) mail service at the southern end of the shed. Immediately outside the shed were seven additional freight tracks. Below the tracks and building was a large area for baggage and mail handling and offices.

After the purchase of the building by Ford in 2018, several individuals came forward looking to return property and architectural features that were stripped and stolen from the station after its closing in 1988, the biggest item of note being the main station clock. The building renovation for Ford is being designed by Quinn Evans Architects of Detroit.

== In popular culture ==
The station has been featured in several films:

- In September 2002, extensive closeups and fly-by shots were featured in the film Naqoyqatsi.
- The 2005 film Four Brothers opens with the main character driving his car along the front of Michigan Central Station toward Michigan Avenue.
- In January 2005, it was used as a location set for the movie The Island (directed by Michael Bay).
- MCS was used for scenes in the movie Transformers (also directed by Bay) in October 2006.
- The building has been used in some of rapper Eminem's work, including his music video for the song "Beautiful", during the beginning of which the building features prominently.
- A scene from the ABC crime drama Detroit 1-8-7 was shot and set inside the station, and it often appeared in the background in other episodes.
- The building's lobby was significant in the closing scenes of the 2012 documentary Detropia.
- It was also used in a climactic fight scene in the 2016 movie Batman v Superman: Dawn of Justice.
- Its exterior was used in the Arrow episode titled "Doppelganger".
- It is also featured in the video game Midnight Club 3: Dub Edition.
- It is featured in the novel Influx by Daniel Suarez.
- It is also shown in the 2016 movie Abattoir as the exterior for a jail that houses the criminally insane.

== See also ==
- Brush Street Station
- Ford Piquette Avenue Plant
- Fort Street Union Depot
- List of railway stations
- National Register of Historic Places listings in Detroit
