= Michigan Central =

Michigan Central may refer to

- Michigan Central Railroad (MC), operating 1841–1995
- Michigan Central Station (MCS), operating 1914–1988
