= Detroiter (train) =

American-Canadian named passenger train (1906–1959)

Overview
- Service type: Inter-city rail
- Status: Discontinued
- Locale: Northeastern United States/Ontario, Canada/Midwestern United States
- First service: 1906
- Last service: 1959
- Former operator: New York Central Railroad

Route
- Termini: New York, New York; Detroit, Michigan
- Distance travelled: 687.6 miles (1,106.6 km)
- Service frequency: Daily
- Train numbers: 47 (westbound); 48 (eastbound)

On-board services
- Seating arrangements: Reclining seat coaches
- Sleeping arrangements: Roomettes, double bedrooms, drawing rooms and compartments (1957)
- Catering facilities: Dining car
- Observation facilities: Lounge car

Technical
- Track gauge: 4 ft 8 1/2 in (1,435 mm)

The Detroiter was an international night train that twice crossed the Canada–United States border, going from New York City to Detroit. This New York Central Railroad train ran northwest of Buffalo, New York into Canada, traveled over Michigan Central Railroad tracks through Windsor, Ontario and reentered the United States to terminate at Detroit's Michigan Central Station.

== History ==
Created as an all-Pullman service, it was the premier train in the New York City to Detroit market for many years. It was one of three NYC trains equipped with new railcars from the Great Steel Fleet, the other two being the 20th Century Limited and the Commodore Vanderbilt. The train completed against the Pennsylvania Railroad's Red Arrow, taking two hours less (13 hours), thanks to a straight and flat route across southern Ontario. In 1957, it left Detroit at 7 pm, passed through Buffalo after midnight and arrived in New York City at 8:15 am. Westbound, it left New York City at 8 pm and arrived in Detroit at 8 am.

In 1944, its consist had a diner and ten sleepers. In April 1956, the Detroiter received several coaches, ending its status as an all-Pullman service.

From 1974 to 1979, Amtrak operated a daytime service, the Niagara Rainbow, from October 31, 1974, and January 31, 1979. The service was truncated to Niagara Falls after Michigan and New York state ended their subsidy for the service
