= Mercury (train) =

American named passenger trains (1936–1959)

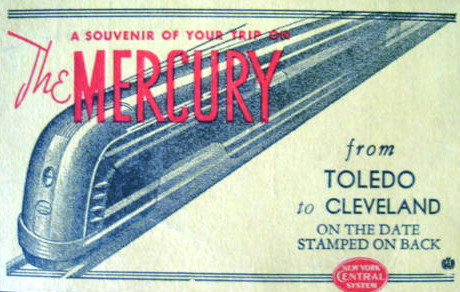
- Ticket for a 1938 trip on the Cleveland Mercury

Overview
- Service type: Inter-city rail
- Status: Discontinued
- Locale: Midwestern United States
- First service: July 15, 1936
- Last service: July 11, 1959
- Former operator: New York Central Railroad

Route
- Termini: Chicago, Illinois (1948, complete circuit); Cleveland, Ohio (1948, complete circuit)
- Service frequency: Daily
- Train number: 75 westbound / 76 eastbound

On-board services
- Class: K-5b
- Seating arrangements: Coaches
- Catering facilities: Dining service; buffet-lounge car
- Observation facilities: Parlor car

Technical
- Track gauge: 4 ft 8 1/2 in (1,435 mm)
- Operating speed: 80 mph (129 km/h)

Mercury was the name used by the New York Central Railroad for a family of daytime streamliner passenger trains operating between midwestern cities. The Mercury train sets were designed by the noted industrial designer Henry Dreyfuss, and are considered a prime example of Streamline Moderne design. The success of the Mercury led to Dreyfuss getting the commission for the 1938 redesign of the NYC's flagship, the 20th Century Limited, one of the most famous trains in the United States of America.

The first Mercury, operating on a daily roundtrip between Cleveland and Detroit, was introduced on July 15, 1936. (Note: July 13 according to Cook.) The Chicago Mercury, between Chicago and Detroit, and the Cincinnati Mercury, between Cincinnati and Detroit, followed. The Mercurys lasted until the 1950s, with the final survivor, the original Cleveland Mercury, making its last run on July 11, 1959.

A fourth train, the James Whitcomb Riley between Chicago and Cincinnati, used the same design for its train sets and is considered part of the Mercury family, although it did not bear the Mercury name. The Riley debuted in 1941 and lasted into the Amtrak era, though no longer a streamliner.

== Design ==
In the mid-1930s, the New York Central launched an experiment to enhance its passenger traffic in the midwest. The goal was a new streamlined service focusing on speed and innovation. "Mercury," the name of the Roman god of messengers (and commerce), was chosen for its connotations of speed; the name was announced to the public on May 14, 1936. The new train was marketed as the "Train of Tomorrow" (not to be confused with the General Motors concept train of the same name in the 1940s), reflecting the emphasis on innovation.

In 1934, Dreyfuss gained attention for the New York Central with his streamlined design for the Commodore Vanderbilt locomotive. This was his first railroad design; he was best known for his work on consumer products like telephones, fountain pens, and vacuum cleaners. In 1935, the Central asked him to take on the new project.

Here is his description of how the plan developed:

The final designs were approved ... but when they were put out for bid prices were so out of line that the project was canceled. It was a heavy blow when I received the bad news, for the trains had been a major effort for our office. I decided to take the rest of the day off, and I boarded a train for the country. En route, traveling the railroad yards of Mott Haven, I saw the answer. I got off the train, returned to New York and suggested [to the Central president] that some of the used cars in the yards might be converted. Out of them the successful Mercurys were built at one quarter of the original figure. The Mercurys have been called a turning point in railroad design. They were the first streamliners done as a unit, inside and out, integrating everything from locomotives to dinner china.

The train's first cars were rebuilt from surplus suburban commuter coaches like those that Dreyfuss saw unused.

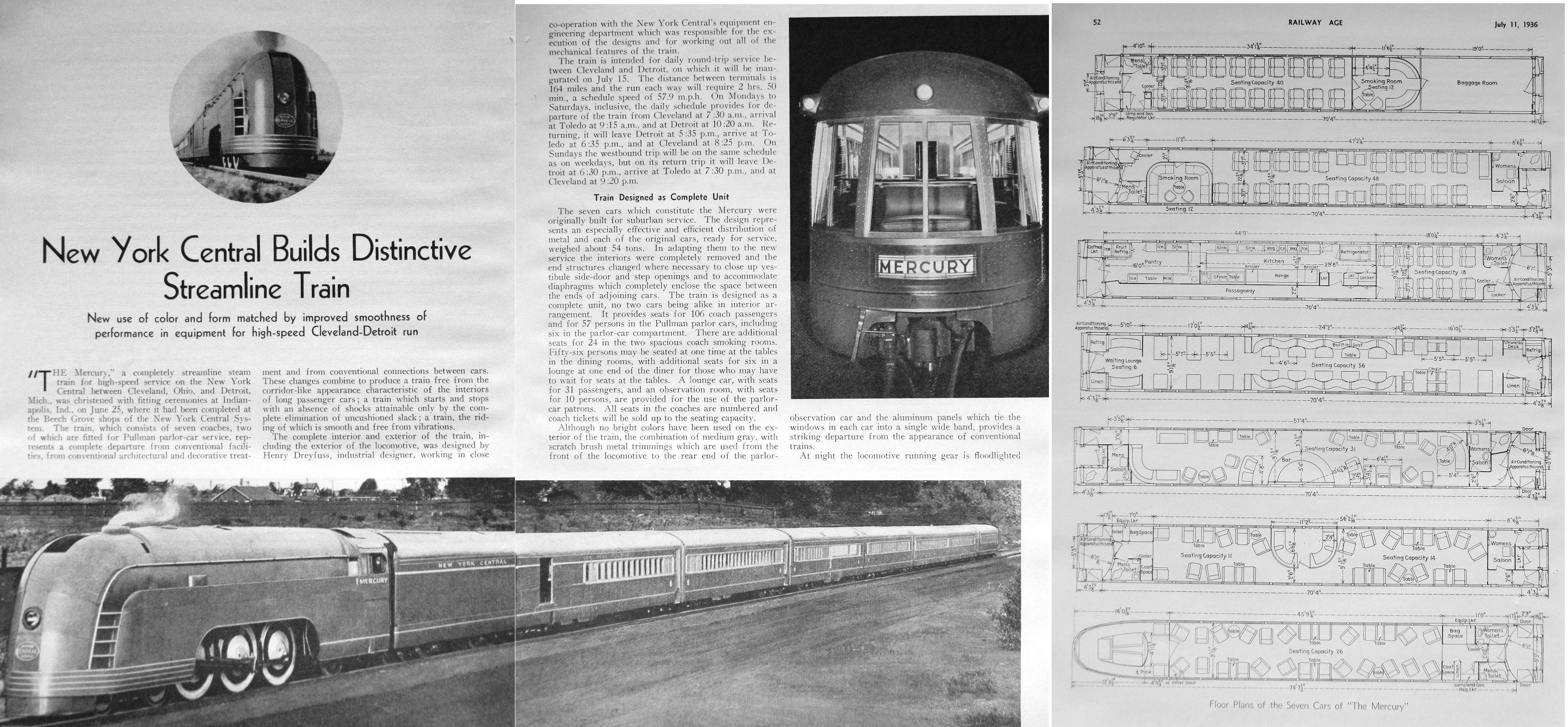
1936 Railway Age article about the New York Central train, The Mercury. The article contains technical descriptions, descriptions of the train's interior and exterior, and a floor plan for all of its 7 cars.

=== Locomotive and exterior ===
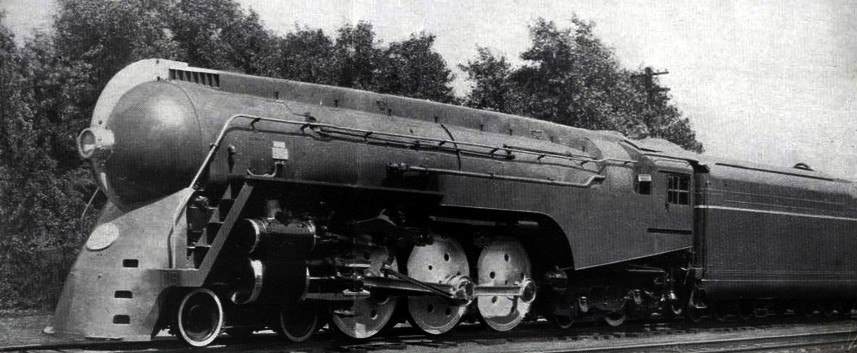
One of the Mercury Hudson locomotives

Of Dreyfuss's railroad designs, the locomotives got the most notice, so much so that his work on passenger cars is often overlooked entirely. For the Mercury, he achieved a streamlined appearance by covering the exterior pipes, whistles, and other fittings in a smooth "bathtub" cowl. The sides of the cowl were cut away to show the driving wheels.

"The ... drivers sported centers painted in aluminum with a black band separating the aluminum discs from the aluminum rim and tire. Dreyfuss had installed three 50-watt and two 15-watt lamps under the cowling on either side to illuminate the drivers and rods. The effect at night was most striking.

The lights illuminating the driving wheels was a novel concept and purported to be the first of their kind. The Mercury trains also incorporated roller bearings on their axles, which helped them reach their speed limit of 80 miles per hour (130 km/h), but also made them harder to stop. Although in service the speed would be restricted to 80 mph, it was reported that the train's top speed was over 100 miles per hour (160 km/h).

It has been said that, "As opposed to [some of his] contemporaries, Dreyfuss was not a stylist: he applied common sense and a scientific approach to design problems." However, it can be seen from his treatment of the driving wheels that Dreyfuss was not above paying close attention to merely stylistic, non-functional details.

The exterior of locomotive and cars was medium gray with brushed aluminum trim (though there have been incorrectly colorized images of the Mercury in a light blue livery which never existed). On each side, the passenger cars displayed the Mercury logo in the form of a silver medallion, showing the god Mercury in traditional representation with winged cap and sandals.

=== Interior ===
For the Mercury, Dreyfuss, approached the design of the train as an integrated whole, interior and exterior, from the locomotive to the rear observation car. His goal was to recreate the atmosphere of a private club. His primary concern toward that end was to mitigate the rigid uniformity and long, narrow form of the conventional railroad car. Although each car was functionally separate, Dreyfuss's design minimized the divisions between cars. He did this partly by having interior sections that spanned car boundaries. For instance, the coach section comprised the rear of the first car, the whole of the second, and the forward part of the third. The kitchen was in the rear of the third, while the dining room was in the following car.

He also sought to integrate the cars by the design of the vestibules. He made each vestibule semi-circular and widened the passageway between cars to 1.60 meters (5 feet, 3 inches). The intended effect, when cars were coupled together, was of a single circular room, like a miniature rotunda. Fabric and rubber buffers between cars and above bogie springs were also added to reduce vibrations.

Within cars, Dreyfuss applied several techniques to break up the space and make it less linear. In the second car, for instance, he interrupted the rows of seating by placing two pairs of seats facing each other across the aisle in the middle of the coach section. Similarly, in the sixth, a parlor car, he broke the seating into two sections with a small private compartment, seating six, in between them. The dining room had three sections. Two of them were conventional seating, but the middle section was made up of tables for two people seated side-by-side, facing the center aisle. The dining car also had a small lounge section, seating six, for people waiting to be seated.

Dreyfuss also applied innovation to the round-ended observation car, a common amenity of premier trains of the time. To maximize the view, he lowered the sills in the observation area by 30 cm (12 inches), allowing 1.23 m (four foot) high windows. Instead of having the seating around the walls, facing in, he placed the seating in the center, facing out towards the windows. There were banquettes for three facing each side, and one for two facing the rear. In an extra touch, a speedometer was built into the center banquette, a reminder of how the Central was marketing speed with the Mercury.

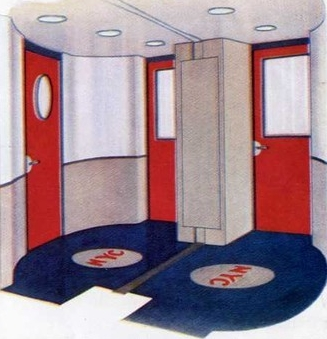
The train's vestibules

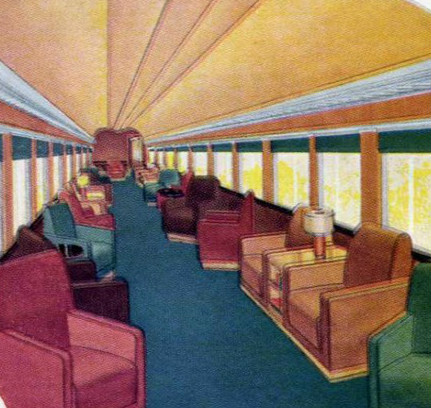
Front of parlor car

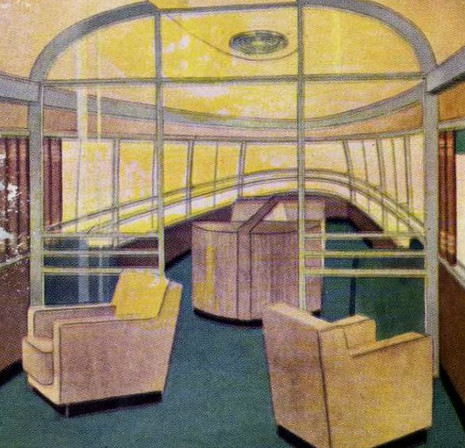
Back of parlor car

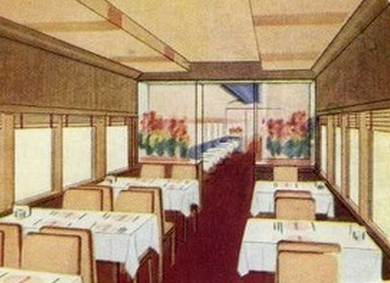
Portion of dining car

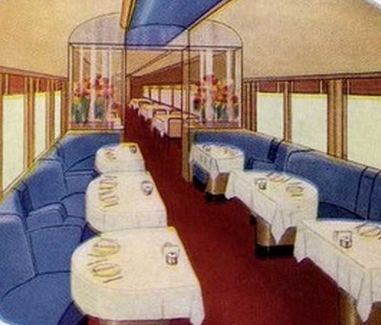
Another part of the dining car

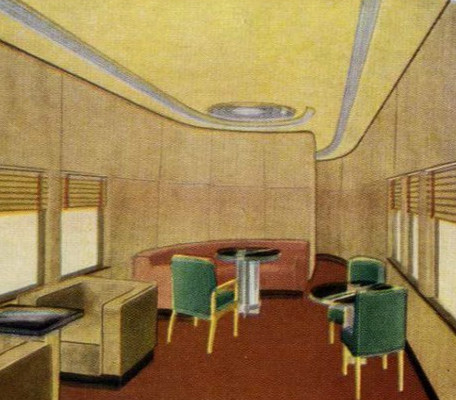
Section of lounge car

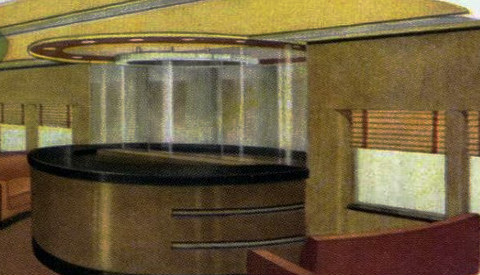
Another section of the lounge car

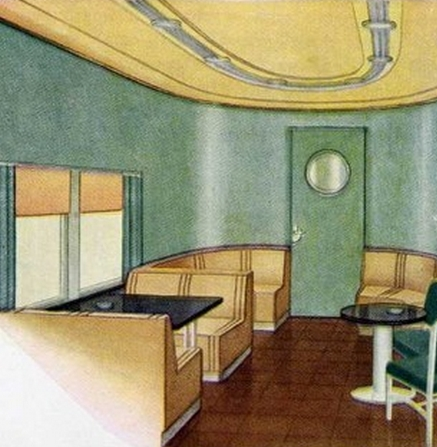
The train's smoking lounge

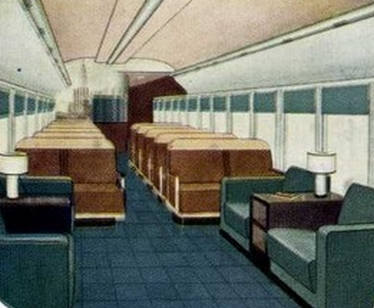
One of the coach cars

=== Original train set ===
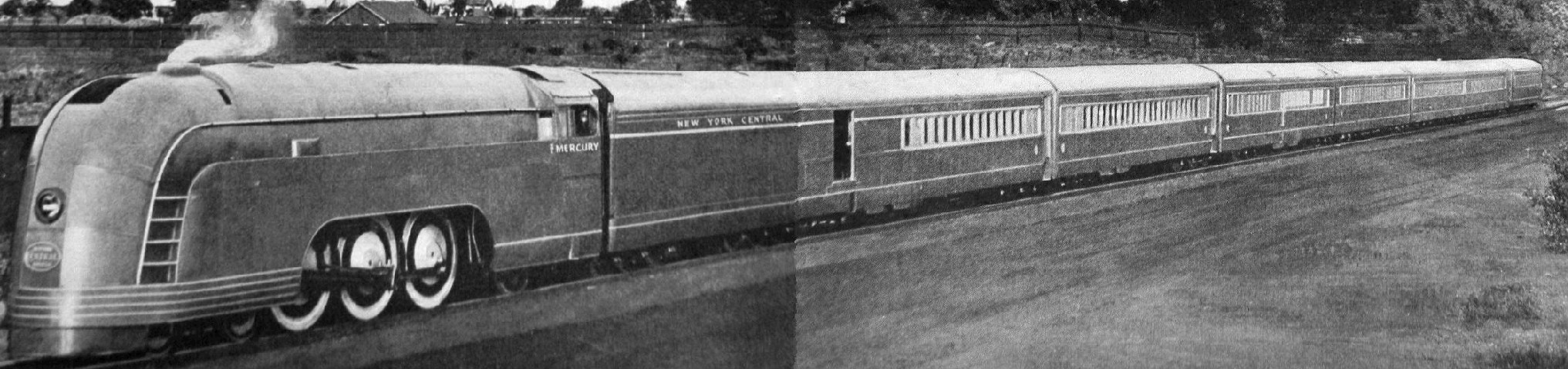
A full train in 1936

The original, Dreyfuss-designed Mercury train set comprised nine cars:

- Baggage/coach
  - Baggage compartment
  - Smoking compartment – capacity 12
  - Coach section – capacity 40
- Coach
  - Coach section – capacity 48
  - Smoking compartment – capacity 12
- Coach/kitchen
  - Coach section – capacity 18
  - Kitchen
  - Pantry
- Dining
  - Dining room in 3 section – capacity 56
  - Waiting lounge – capacity 6
- Coach (added after inaugural runs)
  - Coach section – capacity 56
- Coach (added after inaugural runs)
  - Coach section – capacity 56
- Lounge
  - Lounge section with bar – capacity 31
- Parlor
  - Parlor section – capacity 14
  - Private compartment – capacity 6
  - Parlor section – capacity 11
- Parlor/observation
  - Parlor section – capacity 26
  - Observation section – capacity 11

The cars were modified for Mercury service in New York Central's Beech Grove, Indiana, shops; the first train operated on test runs in June 1936 on a 200-mile (320 km) stretch between Indianapolis and Sheff reaching speeds of 93 miles per hour (150 km/h). For the demonstration runs in early July 1936, the two coaches between the dining and lounge cars were omitted. h

== Named trains, itineraries ==
- Mercury, 75-westbound/76-eastbound, Detroit–Toledo–Cleveland, 1936–1942; Chicago-Detroit–Toledo–Cleveland 1942-1949
- Chicago Mercury, 375-westbound/376-eastbound, Chicago–Kalamazoo–Jackson–Detroit, 1949-1958
- Cleveland Mercury, 75-750-westbound/761-76-eastbound, Detroit–Toledo–Cleveland, 1949-1959
- Cincinnati Mercury, 303-southbound/312-northbound: Detroit–Toledo–Bellefontaine–Springfield–Dayton–Cincinnati, beginning and ending this itinerary, all in 1949;, route and itinerary was succeeded by Queen City (which ended in 1957);
  the Cincinnati Mercury returned in 1951 with these numbers and this route: 421-westbound/424-eastbound (401/402 for final 1956–1957 years): Cincinnati–Dayton–Springfield–Columbus–Cleveland; discontinued, 1957

== Operation ==
The inaugural Mercury trainset was taken on an exhibition tour throughout the New York Central system in late June and early July 1936. The train was displayed and christened in Indianapolis on June 25, then made exhibit stops from Indianapolis to New York City, where it was displayed for two days at Grand Central Terminal on June 28 and 29. In Chicago, it was estimated that about 17,250 people viewed the train in one day when it was on display on July 6 at LaSalle Street Station.

Revenue service for the Cleveland Mercury, with only a stop in Toledo between its two end points, began on July 15, 1936. By September 1936, New York Central found that the new Mercury service did not impact the ridership on other trains it operated between those two cities. It proved so popular that another train was built and displayed in Indianapolis in October 1939; it was built for the Chicago Mercury and was introduced in regular service on November 12, 1939. These two train sets serviced both Cleveland Mercury and Chicago Mercury service, but the schedule was such that one train set began the day in Cleveland, ran to Detroit as the Cleveland Mercury, and ran from Detroit to Chicago as the Chicago Mercury, while the other set did the reverse run (the eastbound Chicago Mercury arrived in Detroit after its westbound counterpart had left, so the NYC would have needed an extra train set, if it had not shared sets across trains). The Cleveland run was on a 2:50 hour schedule and the Chicago run took 4:45.

The James Whitcomb Riley was introduced on April 28, 1941, running between Cincinnati and Chicago on a 5:15 hour schedule. It was named after the popular poet because of his association with Indiana and Americana. The equipment was basically the same as the other Mercurys, although it was an all-coach train. The Cincinnati Mercury, running between Cincinnati and Detroit on a 6:30 schedule, followed the Riley into service.

After World War II, the Mercury trains were re-equipped with new lightweight cars. In February 1950, the westbound Detroit-Chicago Mercury was suspended due to coal shortages while the eastbound counterpart remained in service. The cancellation was the result of an Interstate Commerce Commission order to all railroads still using coal-powered locomotives to reduce services. Service was restored on the westbound route in March 1950.

The Mercury was touted as one of six convenient passenger trains between Detroit and Chicago (with the Wolverine, Michigan, Twilight, Motor City Special and North Shore Limited) with "departure and arrival times made most convenient for you." The Mercury trains operated at speeds up to 80 miles per hour (130 km/h) throughout their service career.

The Cincinnati Mercury was the first to fall as rail service contracted, eliminated in October 1957. The Chicago Mercury was eliminated in April 1958. The Cleveland Mercury was discontinued on July 11, 1959.

The Riley was retained, although it was no longer a streamliner. In 1971, Amtrak combined the Riley with the Chesapeake and Ohio Railway's George Washington. The combined service was renamed Cardinal in 1977, which is still running to this day.

=== Accidents and incidents ===
Because the trains regularly operated at speeds of 75–80 miles per hour (121–129 km/h), accidents occurred at level crossings along their routes. The Mercury's inaugural run between Detroit and Cleveland saw a collision that killed the automobile's driver. In another accident in Michigan in 1940, the train hit a car at a level crossing, completely destroying the car and killing the driver; the wreckage was pushed about 3/4 mile (1.2 km) from the scene of the collision. In another incident in Ohio in 1938, a truck crossing the track in front of a Mercury train was struck and thrown several hundred feet from the collision site. The Mercury was also used in an apparent suicide attempt in Niles, Michigan, in December 1940. Not all level crossing collisions led to death, such as happened in 1958 near Millbury, Ohio, when a car stalled on the track in front of the Mercury; the driver and passenger of the car were able to jump before the car was destroyed with only the passenger's coat getting caught and torn off.

The railroad's Commodore Vanderbilt shared part of the route with the Mercury in Ohio. This was a factor in a 1938 collision where the Mercury had hit a car at a crossing, then stopped to investigate; while the Mercury was stopped, the Commodore Vanderbilt, which had been only 5 minutes behind the Mercury by schedule, collided with the rear of the Mercury, resulting in at least 50 people injured, some seriously. The engineer of the Vanderbilt had applied the brakes when the signal changed in front of him, but wet rails were attributed as the cause of wheel slipping preventing the Vanderbilt from coming to a stop. This was one of several major passenger rail accidents in the United States in 1938, which followed a period of three years when only 10 fare-paying passengers were killed on major rail systems in the country.

The Mercury was also affected by other incidents on the system, such as on July 25, 1957, when a freight train derailed 22 cars at Ceylon in Erie County, Ohio. The derailment scene was severe enough that New York Central rerouted all of its major passenger trains over a lesser-used branch line to bypass the accident. The detour made the Mercury one hour late that day.

== See also ==
- Cardinal
- Ohio State Limited
- James Whitcomb Riley
