= Canadian (NYC train) =

Canadian Canadian-Niagara
Overview
- Service type: Inter-city rail
- Status: Discontinued
- Locale: Great Lakes region
- First service: 1914
- Last service: 1961
- Former operators: Michigan Central Railroad; New York Central Railroad; Canadian Pacific Railway

Route
- Termini: Chicago; Montreal or New York City
- Train number: 19/20

The Canadian and later, Canadian-Niagara, was the longest running named international train from Chicago to Upper Canada via Detroit, for its first two decades running to Montreal. This overnight train was operated by the Michigan Central Railroad from Chicago to Detroit, and in a pool arrangement, it operated over Canadian Pacific Railway tracks and used the same train number from Detroit eastward. The train would carry a second section, bound, variously for Buffalo or New York City via Buffalo.

== History ==
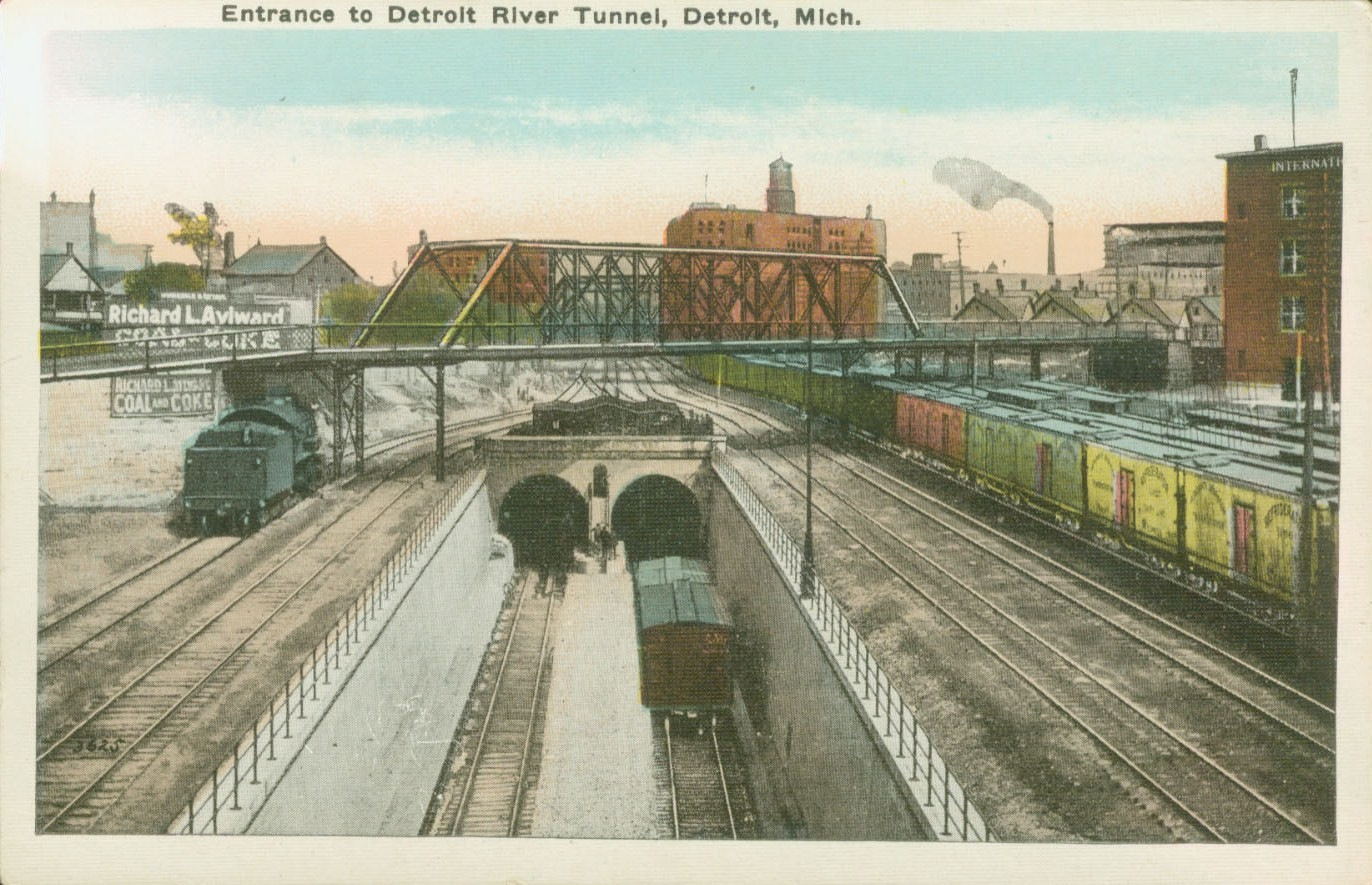
Michigan Central Railway Tunnel, enabling Michigan to Ontario train travel, ca. 1910

The train began with the name, the Canadian, in 1914 and utilized the recently (1910) opened Michigan Central Railway Tunnel under the Detroit River between Detroit and Windsor, Ontario. In the train's earliest decades its coaches and sleeping cars continued beyond Toronto's Union Station to Montreal's Windsor Station. Leaving Chicago's Central Station, the train's eastward train carried the number 20. At the same time, a section of the same train split off east of Windsor and, using the same train number, continued under the name Niagara to Buffalo. The train's westbound trip from Montreal and Toronto to Detroit and Chicago carried the number 19.

By the 1930s, the New York Central Railroad had absorbed the Michigan Central Railroad. In 1934 the Michigan Central changed the eastbound train number to 58; the westbound Canadian would be 39. In 1940 the northeastern terminus was shortened from Montreal to Toronto. Passengers wishing to continue further northeast in the direction of Montreal would need to transfer in Toronto.

During the interwar period the Michigan Central and Canadian Pacific also operated the Dominion-Overseas (1923-1942), which ran during daylight hours between Chicago and Detroit. The Dominion-Overseas (eastbound as #44-22, westbound as Western Express, #21-23) consist included through coaches and sleepers for the Chicago to Montreal route.

In 1942 the parent company New York Central absorbed the Michigan Central operations into its timetables. By 1942, the westbound counterpart was no longer the Canadian working alone, but was tacked onto the North Shore Limited in Detroit for completing the trip to Chicago. However, the Canadian Pacific continued to use the name, Canadian, for #19 on the Toronto-originating part of the route. Also in 1942 the New York Central changed the name of the train to the Niagara-Canadian, skipping possible confusion arising from two different named trains carrying the same number. Also, at this time the train incorporated not only separate sleeper sections for itineraries to Toronto and New York City, but also a section leaving the route at Jackson to go to Saginaw and Bay City. For the west bound trip there would be no Canadian in the New York Central timetable. The Toronto to Chicago itinerary coaches and sleeping cars were merged onto the New York to Chicago North Shore Limited, number 39. In 1946 the New York Central would change the name again, this time, for a longer period, to Canadian-Niagara; the train number would switch from 58 to 358.

== Accidents ==
On February 27th, 1921, the Canadian overran a red signal in Porter, Indiana and derailed off of a Derail near the Interlocking tower, as the New York Central Interstate Express (NYC Train) was approaching the crossing; 37 people were confirmed deceased.

== Decline ==
In 1955 the Canadian Pacific moved the name ‘Canadian’ to its transcontinental Montreal to Vancouver operation, the Canadian. The train numbers 19 (west) and 20 (east) remained on the CP's Toronto to Detroit train (and vice versa), only as an unnamed train. Briefly in early 1961 the New York Central moved the name to ‘Canadian’ again. However, by the end of the year, the New York Central terminated the Canadian, and thus ended the tradition of a continuous international Chicago-Detroit-Windsor-Toronto itinerary, and ending the New York Central's passenger service east from Detroit into Southwest Ontario, except for its Wolverine route bound for Buffalo and New York City. The CP sustained a Detroit to Toronto train until 1967. Any traveler wishing to make the full trip would need to change in Detroit for the Chicago to Detroit portion. The CP cut its service back to Windsor to Toronto in 1967.

== 21st century developments ==
On January 6, 2022, Amtrak announced that Canadian Pacific Limited and Kansas City Southern railroads would cooperate with Amtrak expansion plans. This agreement would allow Amtrak to link with VIA Rail (Amtrak's counterpart in Canada) through the aforementioned Detroit-Windsor rail tunnel. However, news reports did not indicate a timeline for the resumption of passenger service between Detroit and Toronto.
