= Niagara Rainbow =

Amtrak passenger train from New York to Detroit

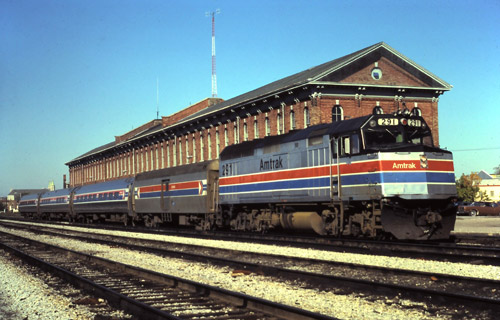
- The Niagara Rainbow at St. Thomas, Ontario in 1978

Overview
- Service type: Inter-city rail
- Status: Discontinued
- Locale: Michigan, New York, Ontario
- Predecessor: Empire State Express
- First service: October 31, 1974
- Last service: January 31, 1979
- Former operator: Amtrak

Route
- Termini: New York; Detroit
- Stops: 16
- Distance travelled: 676 miles (1,088 km)
- Average journey time: 14 hours 50 minutes
- Service frequency: Daily
- Train number: 63, 64

Technical
- Track gauge: 4 ft 8 1/2 in (1,435 mm)

The Niagara Rainbow, known as the Empire State Express before 1976, was an American passenger train service operated by Amtrak between New York City and Detroit via Buffalo and Southwestern Ontario in Canada. The service ran between October 31, 1974, and January 31, 1979.

== History ==
The New York Central operated the Detroiter until 1959 along the Rainbow's route. Immediately prior to the formation of Amtrak in 1971, the Penn Central's Wolverine and Motor City Special had served the route, but Amtrak had truncated the Wolverine to Detroit and discontinued the Motor City Special.

The Empire State Express, as it was then known, made its first run to Detroit on October 31, 1974. Before that it was one of the trains on the Empire Corridor, making a daily run between New York's Grand Central Terminal and Buffalo. The states of New York and Michigan provided the funds to extend the train through to Detroit. A day train, the Empire State Express carried no sleeping accommodations, but did run with a baggage car and diner. At Buffalo, passengers could connect with a Penn Central/Toronto, Hamilton and Buffalo Railway/Canadian Pacific Railway service to Toronto.

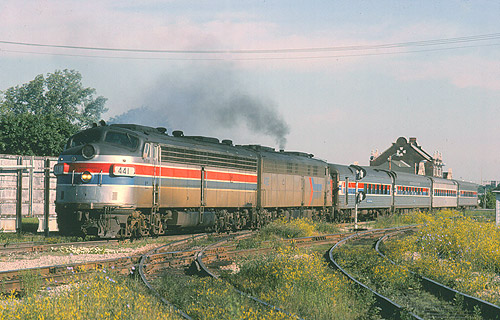
The Niagara Rainbow at Windsor, Ontario in 1978

Amtrak changed the name of the train to Niagara Rainbow on April 25, 1976, although Niagara Falls itself continued to be served by a bus connection. In 1978, several state governments proposed replacing the Niagara Rainbow and its Chicago—Cleveland—New York counterpart, the Lake Shore Limited, with a single train. The proposed service would have separate sections via Detroit and Cleveland west of Buffalo plus separate Boston and New York sections east of Albany. That plan was not implemented and the two trains remained separate. In October 1978 the Niagara Rainbow finally began stopping in Niagara Falls. Unlike the modern Maple Leaf which uses the Whirlpool Rapids Bridge to cross into Canada, the Niagara Rainbow used the Michigan Central Railway Bridge. From Canada the route travelled north then southwest using trackage from Canada Southern Railway with the stops at St. Thomas, Ontario and Windsor, Ontario before crossing the border again into Detroit.

Amtrak truncated the Niagara Rainbow to Niagara Falls on January 31, 1979, after Michigan and New York withdrew their support. The United States Secretary of Transportation, Brock Adams, proposed re-routing the Lake Shore Limited, which ran through Cleveland on the opposite side of Lake Erie, over the Ontario route but this plan was not adopted by Congress.

Amtrak also ran an overnight service between New York and Toronto, also named the Niagara Rainbow, from June 1994 to September 10, 1995. It operated as a once-weekly additional frequency of the Maple Leaf, departing New York on Friday night and returning on Monday morning.

In March 2019, Amtrak indicated interest in 'restoration' of a Detroit-Toronto service in its FY 2020 funding request.

== Equipment ==
The Niagara Rainbow carried a parlor car, cafe-lounge with meal service, coaches, and a baggage car. This distinguished it from the shorter-haul Empire Service trains which used Turboliner trainsets.
