= Wolverine (NYC train) =

American-Canadian named passenger train (1906–1967)

Overview
- Service type: Inter-city rail
- Status: Discontinued
- Locale: Northeastern United States/Ontario, Canada/Midwestern United States
- First service: 1906
- Last service: 1967
- Successor: Amtrak's Niagara Rainbow
- Former operator: New York Central Railroad

Route
- Termini: New York, New York/Boston, Massachusetts; Chicago, Illinois
- Distance travelled: 971.1 miles (1,562.8 km) (New York City-Chicago, via Detroit)
- Service frequency: Daily
- Train numbers: 17 (westbound); 8 (eastbound)

On-board services
- Seating arrangements: Reclining seat coaches
- Sleeping arrangements: Roomettes, double bedrooms, drawing rooms and compartments (1957)
- Catering facilities: Dining car
- Observation facilities: Lounge car

Technical
- Track gauge: 4 ft 8 1/2 in (1,435 mm)

The Wolverine was an international night train that twice crossed the Canada–United States border, going from New York City to Chicago. This New York Central Railroad train went northwest of Buffalo, New York, into Canada, traveled over Michigan Central Railroad tracks, through Windsor, Ontario, reentering the United States, through Detroit's Michigan Central Station, and on to Chicago. At the post-World War II peak of long-distance named trains, there were three other New York Central trains making this unusual itinerary through Southwestern Ontario (with stops in Windsor, Ontario, St. Thomas, Ontario and Welland, Ontario). In the late 1960s, this was the last remaining train taking this route, failing to survive into the Penn Central era. The name resurfaced on the truncated Detroit–Chicago route with Amtrak's Wolverine.

All through the train's years it included a separate section of coaches and sleepers from Boston's South Station, which would link with the main section in Albany Union Station. Until January 1957 the train used Chicago's Central Station, in contrast to the LaSalle Street Station which most of the NYC's trains used. An entirely different west-bound-only New England Wolverine (originating in Boston on an earlier departure) linked at Buffalo's Central Terminal with the Wolverine for the Buffalo-Chicago route; this would be discontinued in 1956. The train would also carry a New York to Bay City, Michigan sleeper (for the New York-Detroit segment), as well as Massena, New York-Pittsburgh, Pennsylvania sleepers (for the Syracuse-Buffalo segment).

In 1957 the Wolverine lost the observation car that it previously had. By 1962 the train included sleepercoaches from the Budd Company for its roomettes. The train dropped the older drawing rooms and compartments. The schedule also dropped Hudson, New York and Ypsilanti, Marshall and Dowagiac, Michigan. In January 1961 the train lost its Boston sleepers.

In December 1967 the train lost its name and was simply the numbered 17 / 8. In the Penn Central era (following the merger with long time rival Pennsylvania Railroad) the train only had its westbound unnamed #61/#17 with sleeper, coach and dining car service. Yet, eastbound an unnamed #14 only ran on a Chicago–Detroit–Buffalo itinerary. Riders would need to switch at a late night hour to a different train at 2:30 am in Buffalo to complete the trip to New York City.

== Popular culture ==
Steely Dan's 1973 song, "My Old School", makes a reference to the Wolverine, which stopped at Rhinecliff, New York, very nearby Bard College, the alma mater of the band's two leaders.
