= Niagara Falls (disambiguation) =

Niagara Falls is a set of large waterfalls on the Niagara River.

Niagara Falls may also refer to:

== Places ==
- Niagara Falls, Ontario, Canada
  - Niagara Falls (federal electoral district), an electoral district of Canada
  - Niagara Falls (provincial electoral district), an electoral district of Ontario, Canada
- Niagara Falls, New York, United States
  - Niagara Falls State Park, in Niagara Falls, New York

=== Other waterfalls ===
- Niagara Falls (British Columbia), Canada
- Niagara Falls (Réunion)
- Niagara Falls (New Zealand)
- Niagara of the South or Cumberland Falls, a waterfall in Kentucky
- Niagara Falls of Pennsylvania or Bushkill Falls
- Big Niagara Falls and Little Niagara Falls, two waterfalls in Baxter State Park, Maine

== Films ==
- Niagara Falls (1926 film), a film produced by George Kirke Spoor
- Niagara Falls (1932 film), a film by Fatty Arbuckle
- Niagara Falls (1941 film), a film by Gordon Douglas

== Music ==
- Niagara Falls (Greg Hawkes album) (1983)
- Niagara Falls (Phish album) (2013)
- Niagara Falls (EP), by Boxhead Ensemble (1999)
- "Niagara Falls" (Chicago song) (1986)
- "Niagara Falls" (composition), a 1997 concert band work by Michael Daugherty
- Niagara Falls (Foot or 2), a 2022 song by Metro Boomin
- "Niagara Falls", a 2025 song by The Weeknd from Hurry Up Tomorrow

== Other uses ==
- "Slowly I Turned" or "Niagara Falls", a comedy skit

== See also ==
- Frozen Niagara Falls, a 2015 double album by Prurient
- Niagara (disambiguation)
- Niagara Falls History Museum
- Niagara Falls Museum
- Niagara Falls station (disambiguation)
