= Niagara Falls station =

Niagara Falls station may refer to:

- Niagara Falls station (New York), an intermodal transit complex in Niagara Falls, New York, USA
- Niagara Falls station (New York, 1978–2016), a former Amtrak station in Niagara Falls, New York, USA
- Niagara Falls station (Ontario), a train station in Niagara Falls, Ontario, Canada

== See also ==
- Niagara Falls (disambiguation)
