= Niagara =

Niagara may refer to:

== Geography ==
=== Niagara Falls and nearby places ===
==== In both the United States and Canada ====
- Niagara Falls, the famous waterfalls in the Niagara River
- Niagara River, part of the U.S.–Canada border
- Niagara Escarpment, the cliff over which the river forms the falls
- Niagara Whirlpool, a natural whirlpool downstream from the falls
- Niagara Gorge, formed by the recession of the falls

==== United States ====
- Niagara Falls, New York, the U.S. city adjacent to the falls
- Niagara County, New York
  - Niagara Falls State Park, the oldest state park in the US
  - Niagara Escarpment AVA, New York wine region
- Niagara, New York, a town
- Fort Niagara, near Youngstown, New York
- Niagara Frontier, a region south of Lakes Ontario and Erie
- Buffalo–Niagara Falls metropolitan area
- Buffalo Niagara Region, an economic region

==== Canada ====
- Niagara Falls, Ontario, the Canadian city adjacent to the falls
- Niagara-on-the-Lake
- Niagara Peninsula, between Lakes Ontario and Erie
- Niagara (federal electoral district), a 19th-century federal House of Commons district and historic county
- Niagara (provincial electoral district)
- Regional Municipality of Niagara
- Diocese of Niagara

=== Other locations ===
==== Australia ====
- Niagara, Western Australia, an abandoned town in the goldfields

==== Canada ====
- Niagara, British Columbia
- Niagara, Toronto, a neighbourhood
- Niagara Peak, a mountain
- Mitchell Lake/Niagara Park, the original name of Cariboo Mountains Provincial Park

==== United States ====
- Niagara, Kentucky
- Niagara, North Dakota
- Niagara, Oregon
- Niagara, Wisconsin
- Niagara (town), Wisconsin

== Arts and entertainment ==
- Niagara (painter and singer) (fl. from 1974), an American punk singer and painter
- Niagara (album) by Red Aim, 2003
- Niagara (band), a French rock band
- Niagara (board game)
- Niagara (1953 film), a film noir starring Marilyn Monroe
- Niagara (2022 film), a Canadian comedy-drama film
- Niagara: Miracles, Myths and Magic, a 1986 IMAX film
- "Niagara" (The Office), an episode of the TV series
- Niagara (Frederic Edwin Church), an 1857 painting
- "Niagara", a song by Sara Evans from the album Restless

== Ships ==
- Niagara (ship), the name of several ships
- Niagara (tug), that sank on Lake Superior in 1904
- Niagara (yacht) a 65-foot sloop built in 1895
- PS Niagara, a Great Lakes steamboat
- HMS Linnet (1814), built in 1814 as Niagara
- HMS Niagara, earlier known as HMS Royal George, a British 20-gun wooden sloop
- USS Niagara, the name of several ships of the U.S. Navy

== Other uses ==
- Niagara (grape), a variety of a grape species
- Niagara Bottling, a bottling company
- Niagara College in Niagara Region, Ontario, Canada
- Niagara University in Niagara County, New York, U.S.
- New York Central Niagara, a steam locomotive
- Renault Niagara, a compact pickup truck
- The Niagara, a historic hotel in Niagara Falls, New York, U.S.

== See also ==
- Nagara (disambiguation)
- Niagara Falls (disambiguation)
- Battle of Niagara (disambiguation)
- Bushkill Falls, also known as "Niagara of Pennsylvania"
- Niagara, Niagara, a 1997 film
