= Buffalo–Depew station =

Railroad station in Depew NY USA

Buffalo–Depew, NY
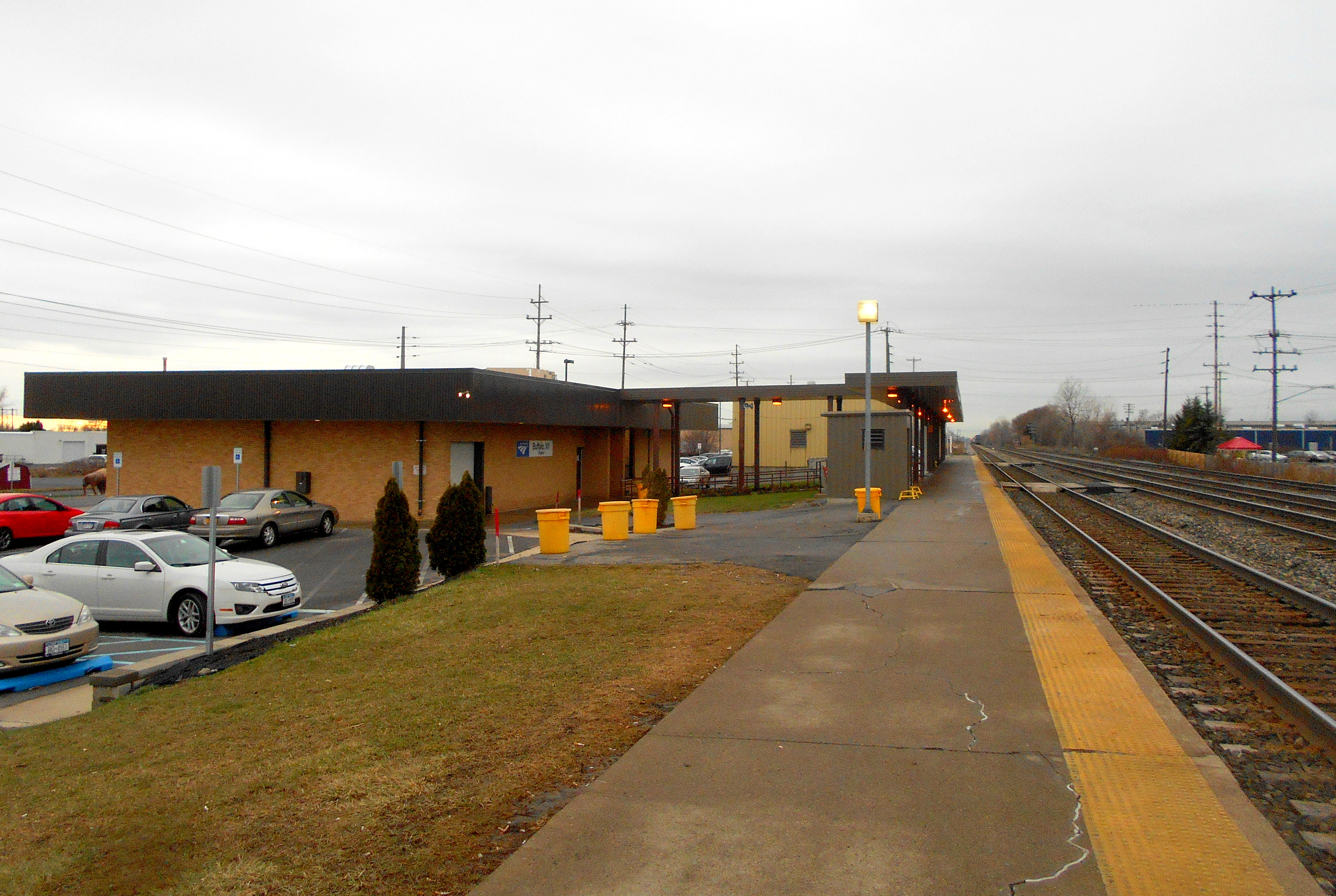
- Buffalo–Depew station in 2014

General information
- Location: 55 Dick Road; Depew, New York; United States
- Coordinates: 42°54′26″N 78°43′36″W
- Owner: State of New York
- Line: Empire Corridor (Rochester Subdivision)
- Platforms: 1 side platform
- Tracks: 4
- Bus operators: NFTA: 46

Construction
- Parking: Yes; free
- Accessible: Yes

Other information
- Station code: Amtrak: BUF; Via Rail: BUFF
- IATA code: ZFZ

History
- Opened: November 28, 1979; 46 years ago

Passengers
- FY 2025: 113,519 (Amtrak)

Services
Preceding station	Amtrak	Following station
Buffalo–Exchange Street toward Niagara Falls, New York	Empire Service	Rochester toward New York
Buffalo–Exchange Street toward Toronto	Maple Leaf	Rochester toward New York
Erie toward Chicago	Lake Shore Limited	Rochester toward New York or Boston South
Location

Buffalo–Depew station is an Amtrak train station in Depew, New York, a suburb of Buffalo. It was built in 1979 to replace the Buffalo Central Terminal as Buffalo's main Amtrak station. (Buffalo–Exchange Street station, located near downtown Buffalo, has limited parking space and is located on a line that is not easily accessible by the Lake Shore Limited.) It is located 10 miles (16 km) east of downtown Buffalo.

The station was built to a standard design common to most Amtrak stations built from the 1970s to the early 1990s. Standard features at Depew include concrete block walls, floor-to-ceiling windows and a cantilevered black roof.

The station is served by eight trains per day: two Empire Service round trips, one Lake Shore Limited round trip, and one Maple Leaf round trip. It has a single side platform adjacent to the southernmost of the four tracks of the Rochester Subdivision. The Lake Shore Subdivision, used by the Lake Shore Limited, diverges to the south between Buffalo–Depew and downtown Buffalo.

== History ==
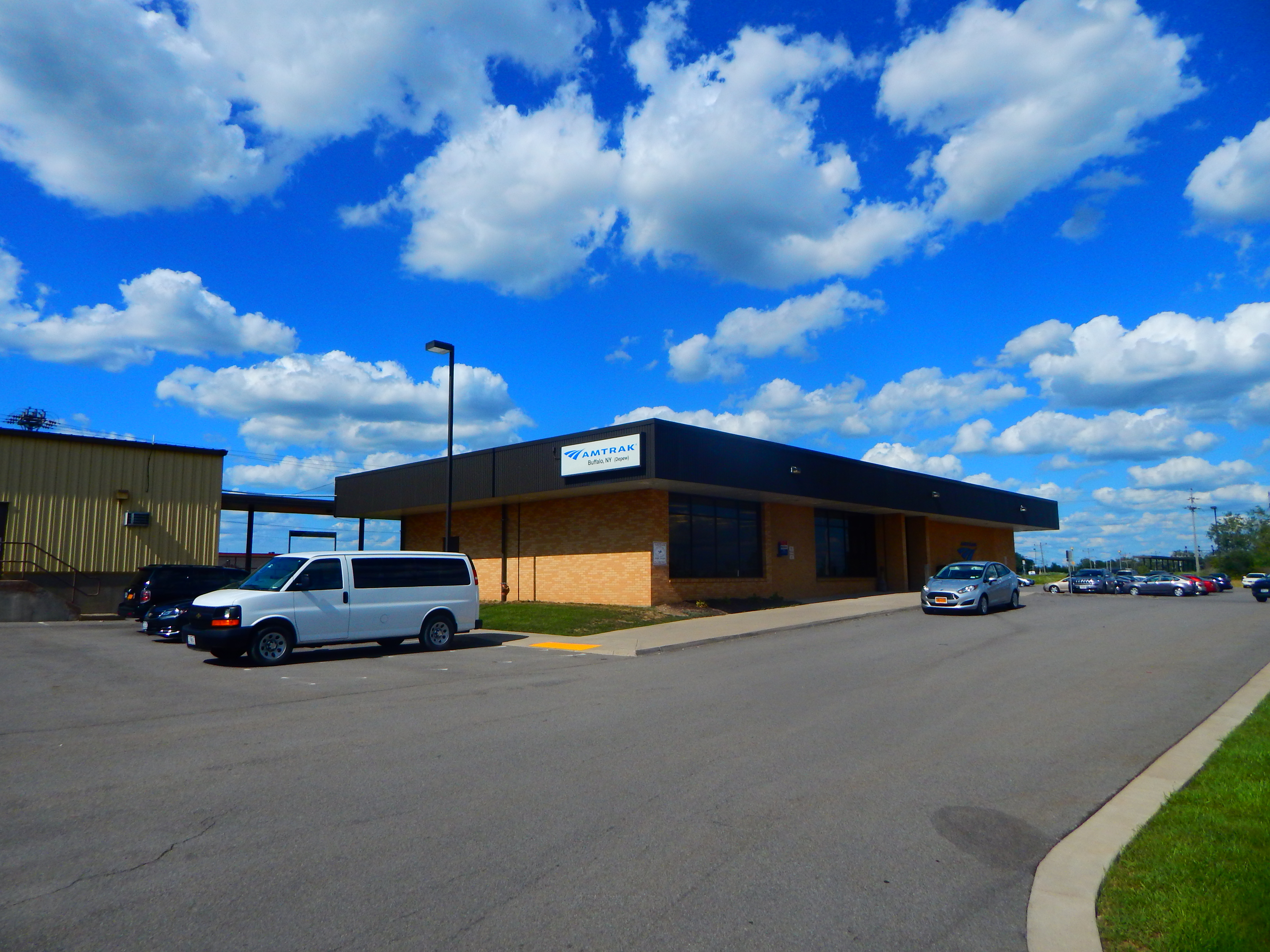
Front of station

By the late 1970s, the once-thriving Central Terminal had been cut back to only four daily trains, nowhere near enough to justify rehabilitating the then 50-year-old terminal. Amtrak decided to build a new station in Depew. Service began on October 28, 1979; hours after the last train pulled out of Central Terminal. The Empire State Express (now part of the Empire Service) and Niagara Rainbow were routed through the new station on the day it opened; previously, the only Buffalo stop for both trains had been Buffalo-Exchange Street. They were joined in 1981 by the Maple Leaf, which offered a one-seat ride from New York to Toronto. Previously, one train per day that connected with Via Rail Canada/Toronto, Hamilton and Buffalo Railway service to Toronto stopped at Exchange Street.

The original building was a trailer which had previously served as the temporary station building in Dearborn, Michigan (Dearborn opened on October 1, 1979). The permanent building, which opened in 1980, was financed by the New York Department of Transportation. The station is near the site where in 1893, Empire State Express Locomotive #999 attained its alleged top speed of 112.5 miles per hour (181 km/h), making it the fastest locomotive of its time.

On September 23, 2014, a bison statue was dedicated on the lawn in front of the depot. It recalls two similar pieces that once occupied prominent spots inside Buffalo Central Terminal. Funding for the fiberglass statue was raised by railroad heritage and advocacy groups within the state. A new bison statue has also been placed in Buffalo Central Terminal by the Buffalo Central Terminal Restoration Corporation.
