= Niagara (ship) =

Several ships have been named Niagara. They include:

- RMS Niagara, Cunard Line ship launched in 1848
- RMS Niagara, ocean liner launched in 1912 and sunk by a mine in 1940
- SB Niagara, Thames sailing barge launched in 1898
- SS Niagara, ocean liner launched in 1908 as Corse, renamed Niagara in 1910 and scrapped in 1931
- USS Niagara: various United States Navy vessels of that name
- USS Thatcher (DD-162), transferred to the Royal Canadian Navy in 1940 and renamed HMCS Niagara
- Niagara (tug), wooden tugboat built in 1872, sank in 1904

== See also ==
- Niagara (disambiguation)#Ships
- Niagara II (ship)
