= Charles Conrad =

Charles Conrad may refer to:

- Pete Conrad (Charles Conrad Jr., 1930–1999), American astronaut
- Charles Magill Conrad (1804–1878), 22nd United States Secretary of War
- Charles E. Conrad (1925–2009), acting coach
- Charles J. Conrad, member of the California legislature
- Charles Conrad Abbott (1843–1919), American archaeologist and naturalist
- Charles Conrad Schneider (1843–1916), American civil engineer and bridge designer
