= Minato Bridge =

Minato Bridge 港大橋
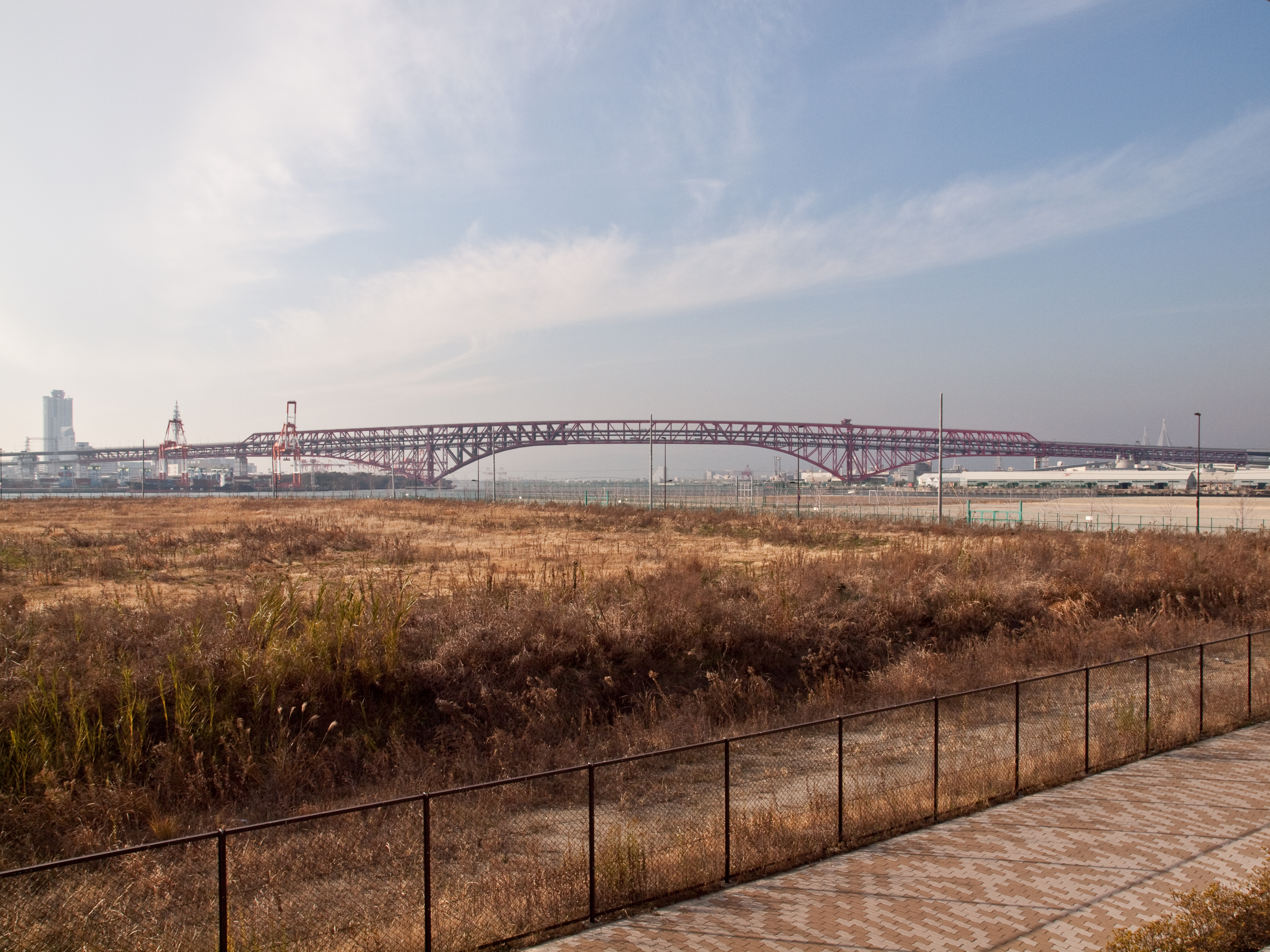
- Coordinates: 34.644069°N 135.437629°E
- Carries: vehicular traffic
- Locale: Osaka, Japan
- Maintained by: Hanshin Expressway Company, Limited

Characteristics
- Design: double-deck cantilever truss bridge
- Material: High-strength steel
- Total length: 983 metres (3,225 ft)
- Width: 22.5 metres (74 ft) (deck)
- Longest span: 1 × 510 metres (1,670 ft); 2 × 235 metres (771 ft)
- Clearance below: 51 metres (167 ft)

History
- Construction end: 1973
- Construction cost: US$117 million
- Opened: 1974

The Minato Bridge is a double-deck cantilever truss bridge in Osaka, Japan; upper deck is for Hanshin Expressway Route 16 Osakako Line, and lower deck is Route 5 Bayshore Line. It opened in 1974. It is the third-longest cantilever truss span in the world, behind the Quebec Bridge and the Forth Bridge.

Designs including arch and suspension elements were eliminated from consideration due to poor subsoil conditions of alternating layers of clay and gravel. Instead, the designers selected a cantilever structure using high-strength steel, to reduce mass.

== See also ==
- Hanshin Expressway
