= Buffalo–Exchange Street station =

Amtrak train station in Buffalo, New York, US

Buffalo–Exchange Street
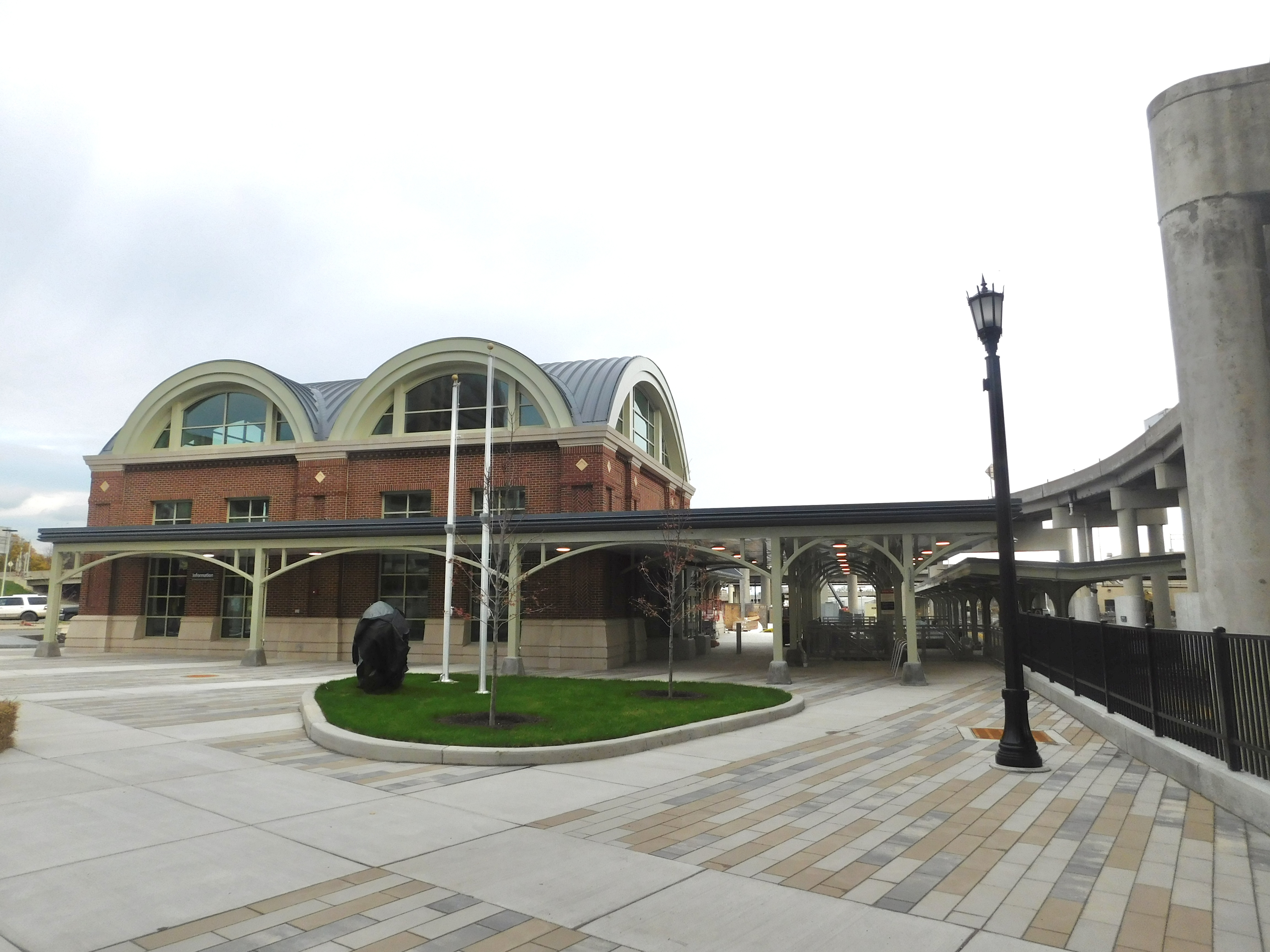
- Exchange Street station nearing the end of construction, November 2020.

General information
- Location: 75 Exchange Street; Buffalo, New York; United States
- Coordinates: 42.8783°N 78.8738°W
- Owner: New York State Department of Transportation, CSX Transportation
- Line: Empire Corridor (Niagara Subdivision)
- Platforms: 1 side platform
- Tracks: 2
- Connections: Amtrak Thruway; Buffalo Metro Rail at Canalside; NFTA: 14 Abbott, 16 South Park, 42 Lackawanna, 74 Hamburg

Construction
- Parking: 10 long term, 10 short term
- Cycle facilities: Yes
- Accessible: Yes

Other information
- Station code: Amtrak: BFX; Via Rail: BUFX
- IATA code: ZXS

History
- Opened: 1848, 1952
- Closed: 1935, 1959
- Rebuilt: 1978, 2020

Passengers
- FY 2025: 51,269 (Amtrak)

Services
Preceding station	Amtrak	Following station
Niagara Falls, New York Terminus	Empire Service	Buffalo–Depew toward New York
Niagara Falls, New York toward Toronto	Maple Leaf	Buffalo–Depew toward New York
Former services
Preceding station	Amtrak	Following station
Niagara Falls, New York toward Detroit (Michigan Central)	Niagara Rainbow (1978–1979)	Buffalo toward New York (Grand Central)
Preceding station	New York Central Railroad	Following station
Buffalo–Terrace toward Chicago	Michigan Central Railroad Main Line	Buffalo Terminus
Buffalo–Terrace toward Welland	Fort Erie Branch	Buffalo Terminus
Lackawanna toward Chicago	Lake Shore & Michigan Southern Main Line (before 1929)	Terminus
Terminus	Main Line (before 1929)	East Buffalo toward New York
Terminus	River Division	East Buffalo toward Weehawken
Location

Buffalo–Exchange Street station is an Amtrak station in Buffalo, New York. The station serves six Amtrak trains daily: two daily Empire Service round trips between Niagara Falls and New York City and one Maple Leaf round trip between Toronto and New York City. There is also daily Amtrak Thruway bus service (operated by Coach USA) at the station, operating between the Buffalo Metropolitan Transportation Center and Jamestown station in Jamestown, New York, via Dunkirk and Fredonia, and serving the communities along the southeast shore of Lake Erie.

Local transportation is provided by the Niagara Frontier Transportation Authority (NFTA), which operates buses and the Buffalo Metro Rail. Buffalo–Exchange Street is located close to Metro Rail's Canalside station and the two stations are connected by a lit pathway beneath Interstate 190 with decorative cement and signage. The station is close to the KeyBank Center and Sahlen Field.

The station has one high-level side platform on the north side of two tracks. It is one of two stations in the Buffalo area, the other being Buffalo–Depew station which serves the Lake Shore Limited. The current station is the fifth train station to be built at the current site, it was rebuilt in 2020.

== History ==
There have been four previous New York Central Railroad stations on Exchange Street in Buffalo.

=== Early stations ===
Buffalo's first true railroad passenger station was built in 1848 on Exchange Street. It was a small brick building that was added to or changed at least 5 times during its use. It was built by the New York Central and Hudson River Railroad.

The first attempt to direct rail traffic out of downtown Buffalo came in 1874, when a Union Depot (East Buffalo) opened on William Street. The new station proved unpopular, and as such Exchange Street station remained open.

The third station on the site was built in 1880. The biggest issue with the Exchange Street site at the time aside from the station's small size for being the main station in Buffalo was that it was plagued with downtown congestion as the crossings in and out of the area were at grade and therefore had to contend with busy city streets. The station's importance declined after Buffalo Central Terminal which was built to solve the issues at the Exchange Street site opened in 1929. The third Exchange Street station was closed on November 13, 1935, and demolished shortly after.

=== Fourth station building ===
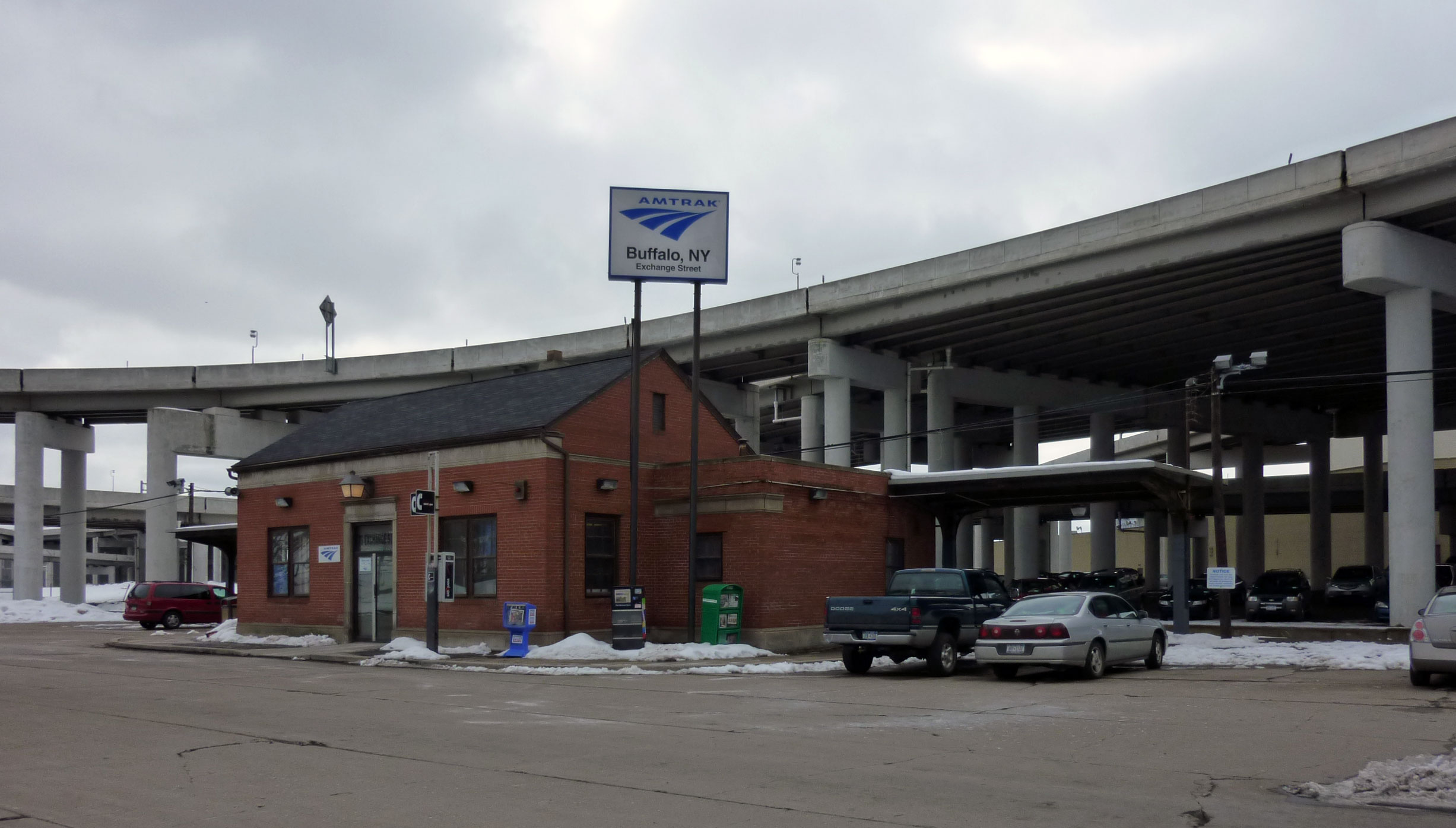
The fourth Buffalo–Exchange Street station in 2011

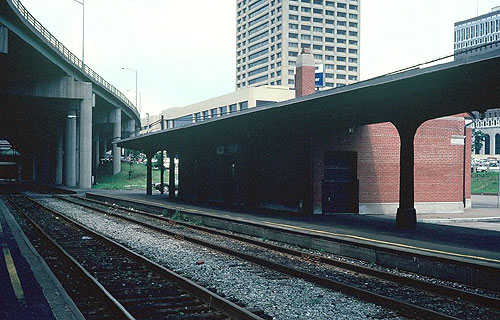
The station in November 1980 before reduction to single track

Planning for the fourth and final New York Central structure began in 1949. New York heavily funded the station as being part of the Skyway construction. The total cost was $7 million. The station opened on August 2, 1952, as a secondary station to the Buffalo Central Terminal. The station originally served 21 New York Central and Toronto, Hamilton & Buffalo Railway trains daily. The double track station had two side platforms connected by an overhead walkway.

Soon after the station was built passenger rail service began a steep decline that would eventually lead to the end of private passenger rail service in the United States. As part of the decline and problems within the railroad, on May 15, 1959, the New York Central Railroad ceased passenger operations to Niagara Falls, and the station building was closed, though some trains continued to stop at the platforms for a brief time. During this time the overhead walkway that connected the station's two platforms was demolished.

On October 29, 1978, Amtrak routed the Niagara Rainbow through Niagara Falls, restoring service to downtown Buffalo and to the station. One old platform was reused immediately; a temporary structure was used for Niagara Rainbow and Empire State Express passengers while the station building was renovated. Exchange Street became one of the two main Buffalo train stations alongside the then-new Buffalo–Depew station when Buffalo Central Terminal closed in 1979. The line was later reduced to single track in the 1980s and the second platform was abandoned.

By the 2000s, the Buffalo–Exchange Street station had gained a reputation for being long outdated and in such a deteriorating condition that it got dubbed as one of the saddest Amtrak stations in America by CityLab in 2015. In September 2016, the station building was temporarily closed due to a partial collapse during heavy rains, further highlighting the need for a new station. The platforms remained open for passengers. Demolition of the 1952 station began on August 22, 2019, to make way for the new station.

=== Current station ===
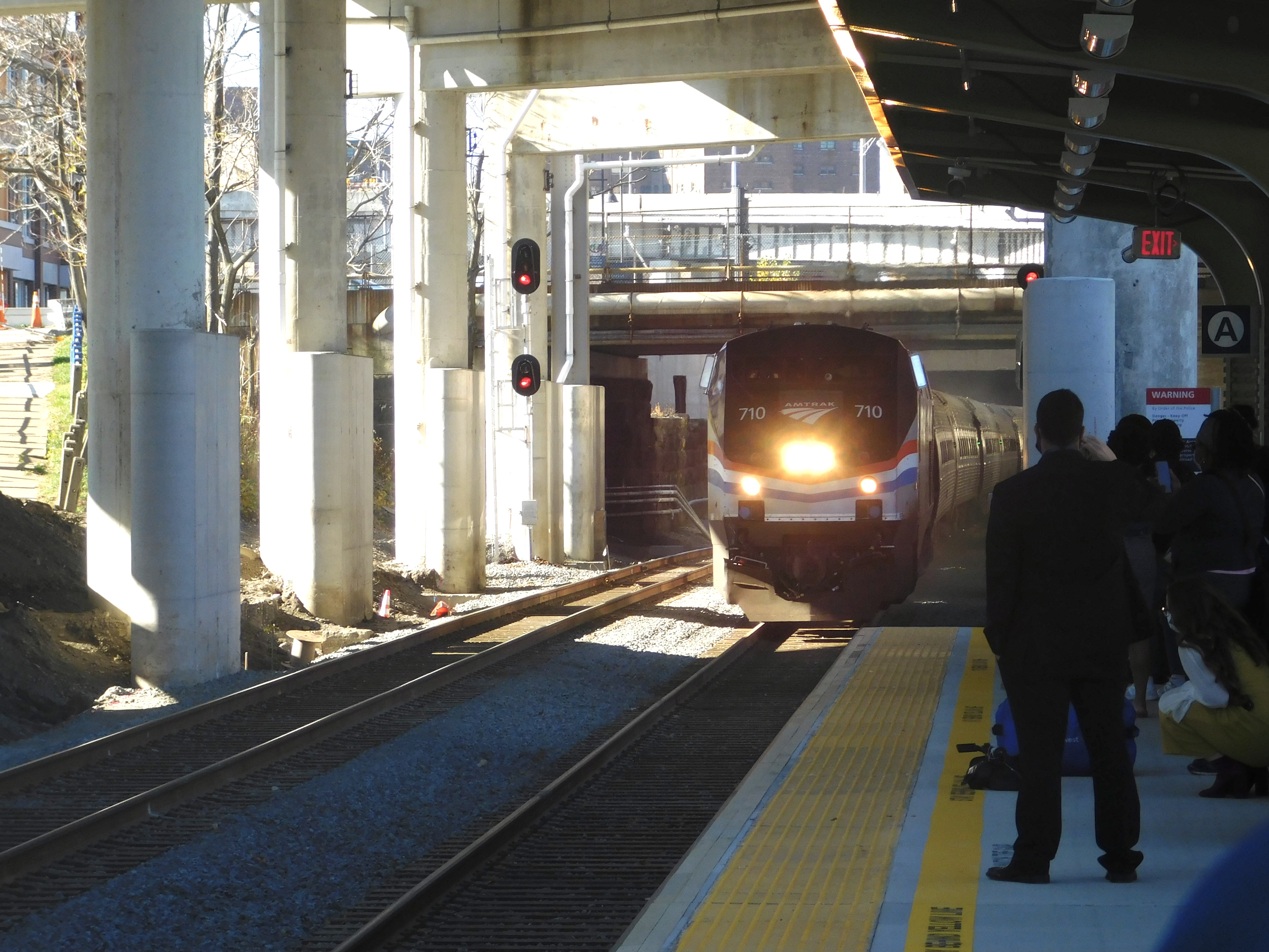
The first train, Maple Leaf, arriving at the new platform on November 8, 2020

Beginning in 2016, there were proposals to replace the dilapidated station with either a station at Canalside or at Buffalo Central Terminal as part of that building's restoration. The Exchange Street site where the previous station sat was chosen because of its proximity to the central business district, though public opinion strongly favored the Buffalo Central Terminal site. Supporters of the latter site alleged that the selection was made for political favors rather than on the merits of the downtown site. On April 17, 2017, a panel including Buffalo mayor Byron Brown approved the downtown location.

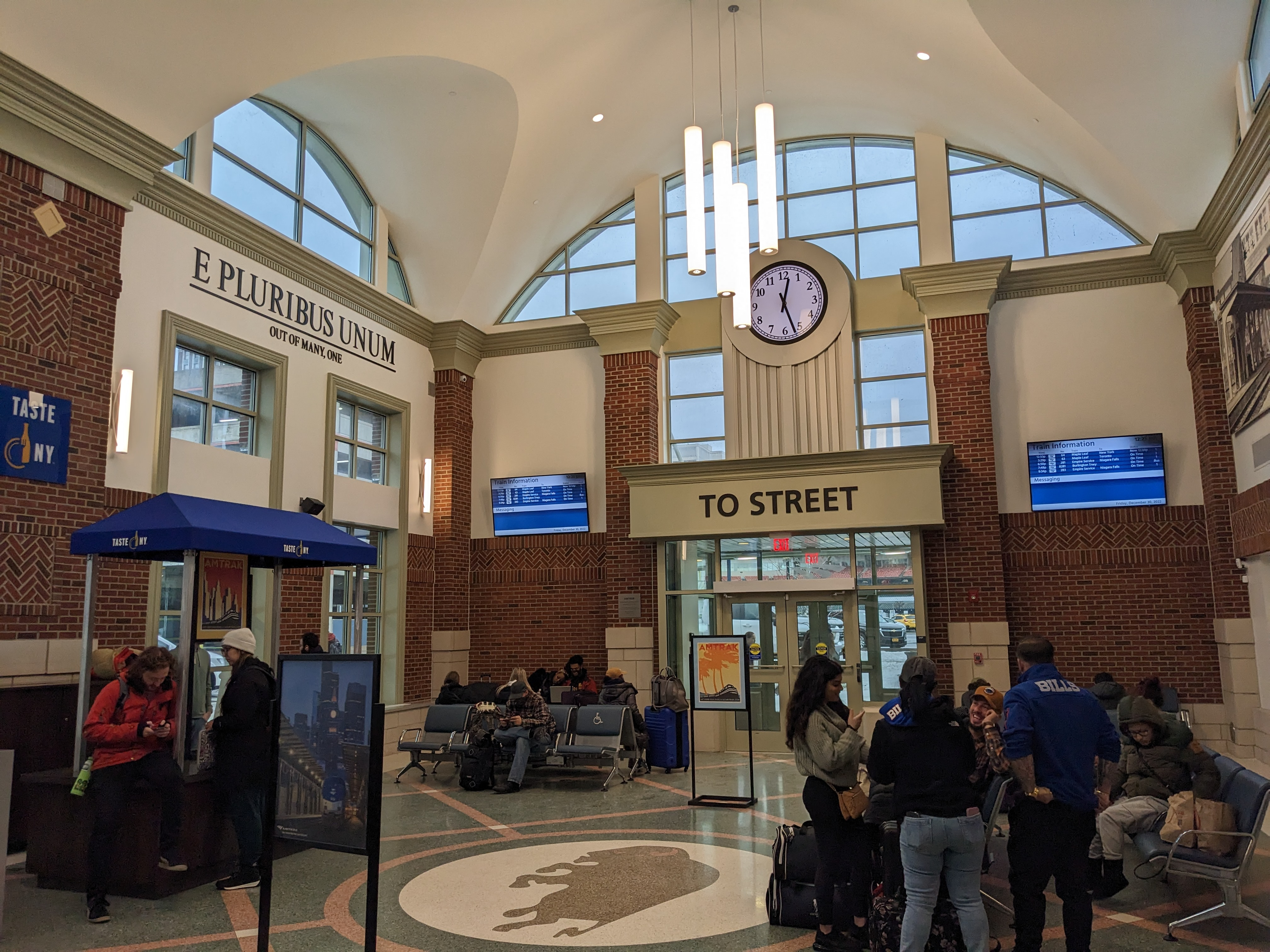
Interior of rebuilt Buffalo Exchange Street station

The New York State Department of Transportation awarded a $27.7 million design-build contract in December 2018. Construction of a temporary station began in June 2019 and the 1952 station was demolished shortly after. The new station opened on November 8, 2020. The first train to stop at the station was the eastbound Maple Leaf, arriving at 12:55 p.m. Assemblywomen Crystal Peoples-Stokes, Lieutenant Governor Kathy Hochul, Mayor Byron Brown, and State Senator Tim Kennedy attended the ribbon cutting. The new Buffalo–Exchange Street station in 2020 came as part of upgrades made to the Empire Corridor which also included new stations in Niagara Falls in 2016, Rochester in 2017, and Schenectady in 2018.

== Station layout ==
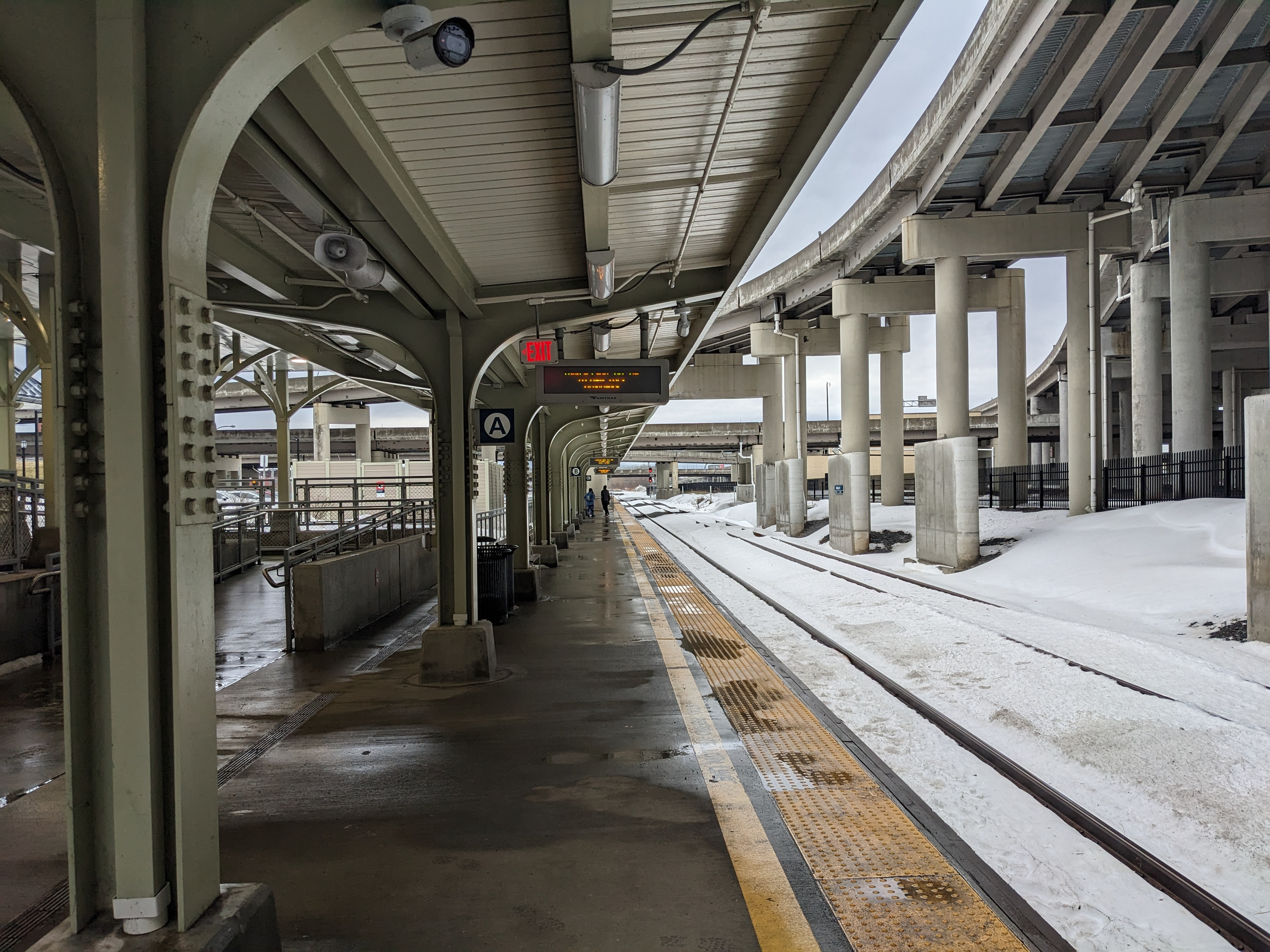
View from platform looking east

The current station is 4,800 square feet (450 m^{2}) and is closer to Exchange Street and higher in elevation then the previous station so the building is not shadowed by the Interstate 190 viaduct. There is a lit, covered pedestrian walkway under I-190 to connect the Amtrak station to Canalside station of the Buffalo Metro Rail on Main Street. Trains call at a single high-level covered side platform serving one track with a second track for freight trains to pass through the station away from the platform. There is a waiting room on the east side of the building, designated drop-off and pick-up zones, and an area for 14 canopied parking spaces for Greyhound, Trailways and NFTA buses if they are later added.
