= Battle of Niagara =

The Battle of Niagara may refer to:

- Fort Niagara, a fort used in the American Revolutionary War, the Seven Years' War, and the War of 1812.
- The Battle of Fort Niagara of the Seven Years' War, taking place in July 1759.
- The Capture of Fort Niagara of the War of 1812, taking place in December 1813.
- The Battle of Lundy's Lane, also called the Battle of Niagara, of the War of 1812, taking place in July 1814.
- Battle of Niagara, an 1818 poem by John Neal
