= Niagara Falls station (New York, 1978–2016) =

Niagara Falls, NY
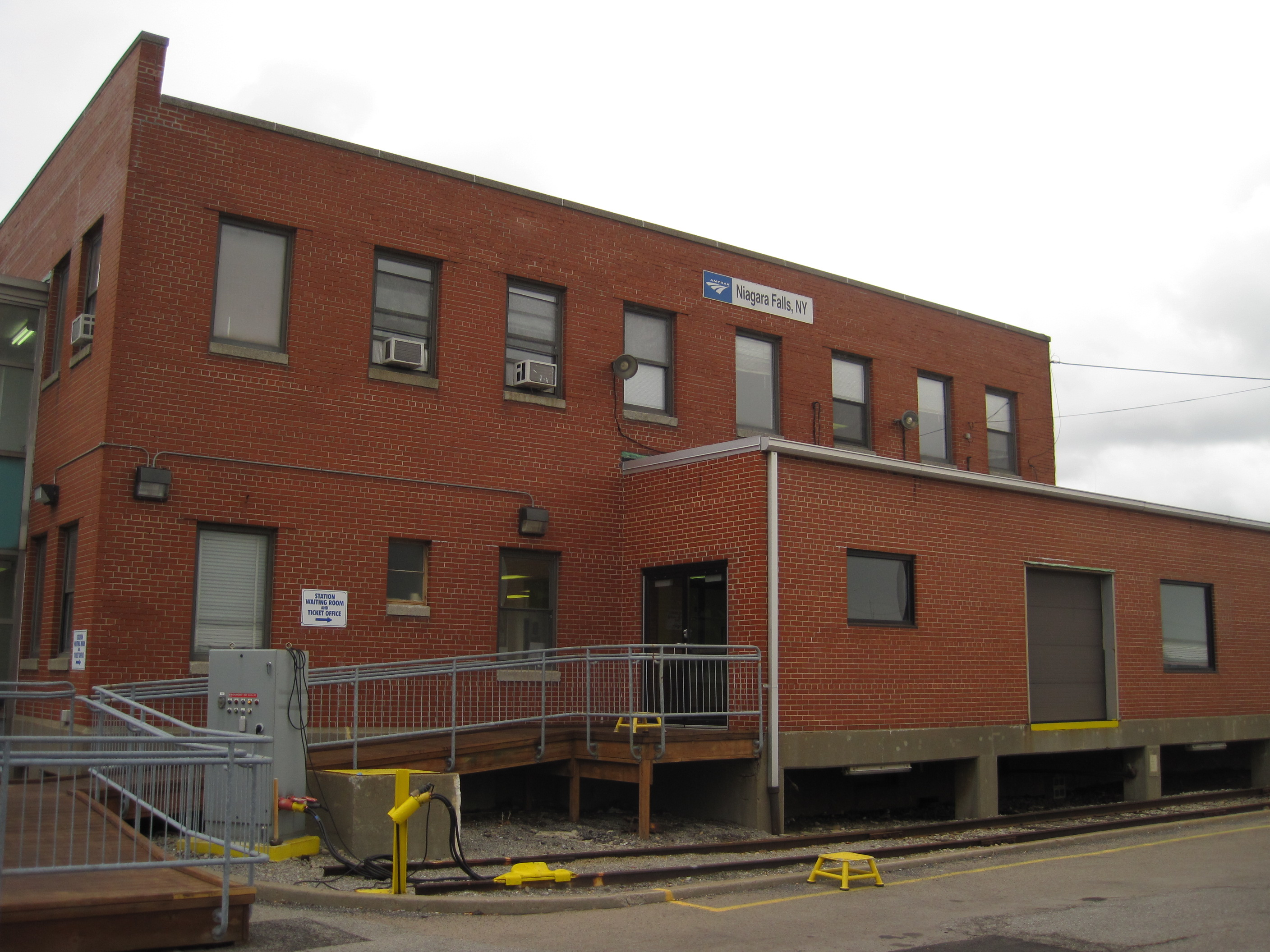
- The former Niagara Falls station building

General information
- Location: 2701 Willard Avenue; Niagara Falls, New York; United States
- Coordinates: 43°06′49″N 79°01′54″W
- Owner: Owasco River Railway
- Lines: Empire Corridor; Niagara Subdivision
- Platforms: 2 island platforms
- Tracks: 3

Construction
- Accessible: Yes

Other information
- Status: Closed for passenger service
- Station code: NFL (former)

History
- Opened: Building: 1959; Amtrak station: October 29, 1978
- Closed: December 6, 2016

Passengers
- 2016: 29,647 ▼6.9%

Former services
Preceding station	Amtrak	Following station
Terminus	Empire Service 1978–2016	Buffalo–Exchange Street toward New York
Niagara Falls, Ontario toward Toronto	Maple Leaf 1981–2016	Buffalo–Exchange Street toward New York
St. Thomas toward Detroit (Michigan Central)	Niagara Rainbow 1978–1979	Buffalo–Exchange Street toward New York (Grand Central)
Location

Niagara Falls station is a former Amtrak railroad station in Niagara Falls, New York. Operating from 1978 to 2016, it was replaced by the current Niagara Falls station. During its time, it was the western end of the Empire Corridor and served the Empire Service, Maple Leaf, and Niagara Rainbow lines.

The building was originally a freight warehouse for Lehigh Valley Railroad, built in 1959. The station opened for Amtrak on October 29, 1978, marking the return of the first passenger rail service to Niagara Falls, New York since 1961. After its replacement as a station on December 6, 2016, it now serves as a train servicing and crew facility. It is located at Willard Avenue and 27th Street on the outskirts of town, about three miles from Niagara Falls and the city's downtown.

== History ==
=== Early stations ===
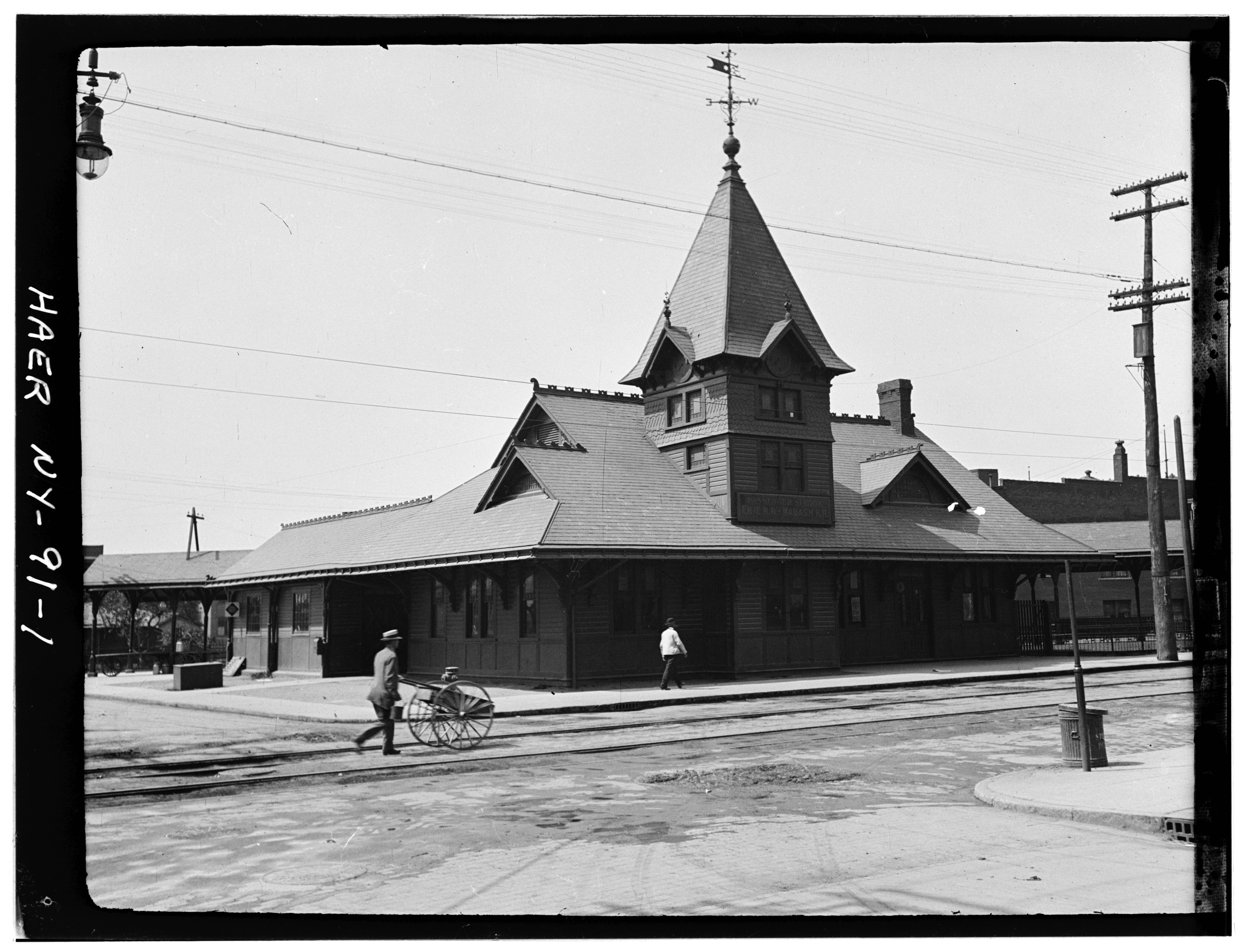
General view of station – Erie Railway, Niagara Falls station

Rail service arrived in Niagara Falls around 1840, when the Buffalo and Niagara Falls Railroad completed the connection to Buffalo. As the town grew, prompted by the Erie Canal, the Niagara Falls Suspension Bridge, and the Niagara Falls Hydraulic Power and Manufacturing Company, rail service increased. Eventually, three different passenger stations were operating at the same time. New York Central Railroad, which took over the Buffalo and Niagara Falls Railroad, built a new station downtown at Falls Avenue and 2nd Street in 1851. The Erie Railroad built its own station a block away at Niagara Street and 2nd Street. In 1887, New York Central built a new Union Station at Depot and 10th Avenue near the Suspension Bridge and the U.S. Customhouse; this became the city's main station and at its peak served ten different railroads.

New York Central's original downtown station burned down in 1888, and was replaced with a new Italianate facility. Erie Railroad shuttered its downtown station in 1901; the structure was relocated to 4th Street and was eventually demolished in 1930. In 1961, New York Central shut down its downtown station. Both it and the Union Station were demolished in 1964, ending passenger rail service to Niagara Falls for 14 years.

=== Amtrak comes to Niagara Falls ===
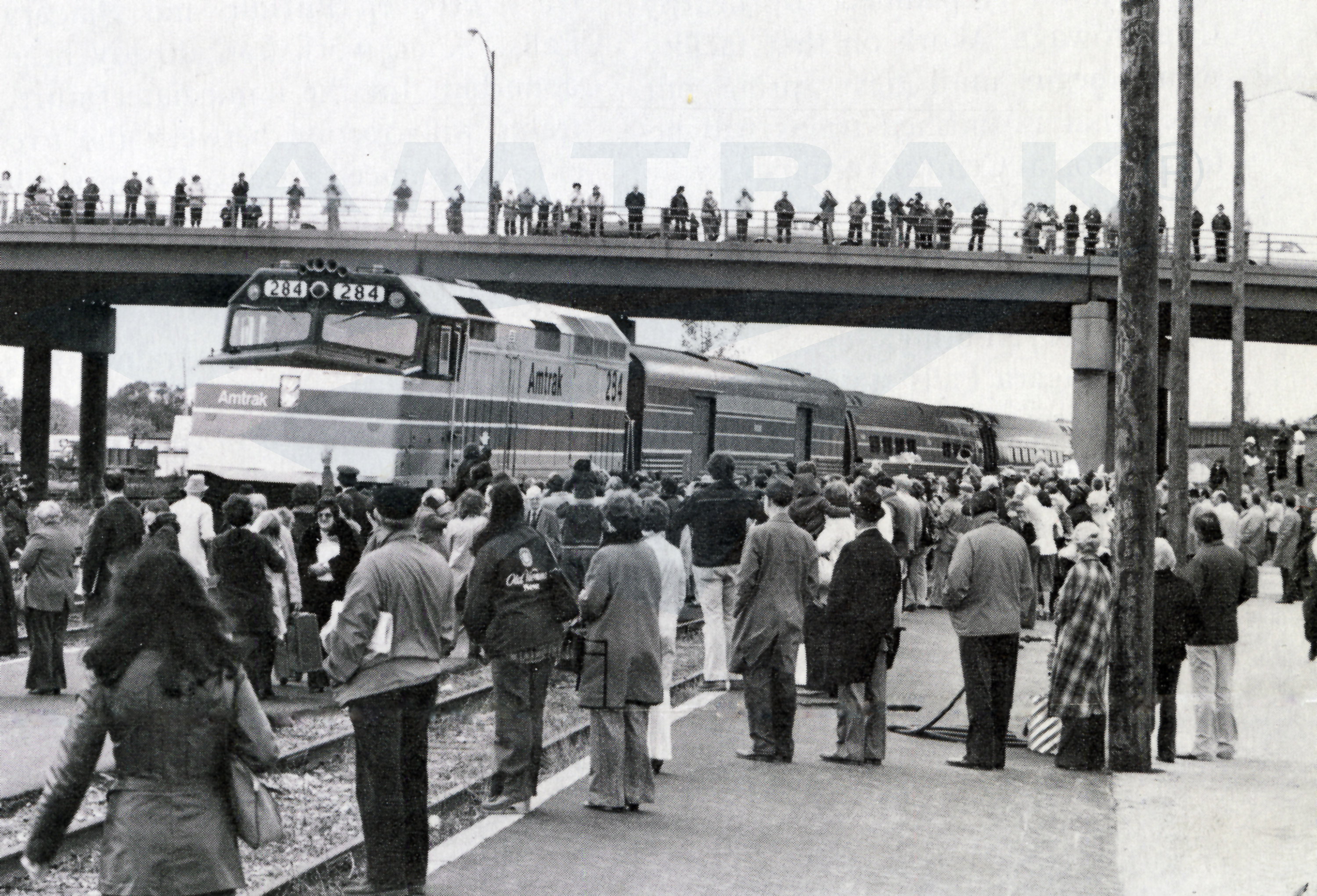
The Niagara Rainbow arrives at the station during dedication ceremonies on October 29, 1978

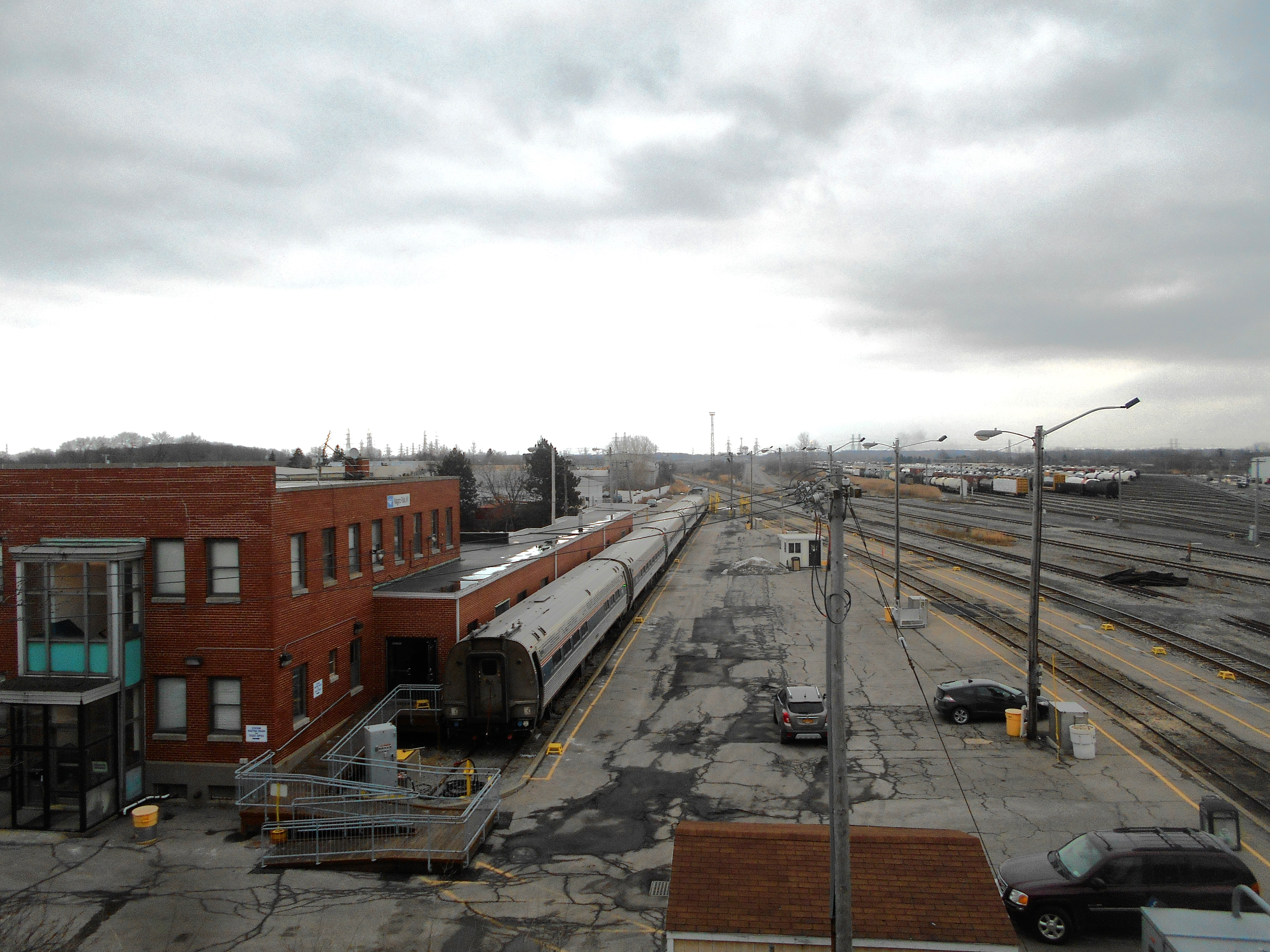
Niagara Falls station and yard in December 2014

Amtrak, in partnership with the State of New York, established the Willard Avenue station in 1978. For this purpose, they converted a former Lehigh Valley Railroad freight warehouse built in 1959 into a passenger station. The now former station is located on the edge of town, three miles from the falls and Downtown Niagara. Amtrak service began on October 29, 1978. More than 500 people attended the inaugural ceremonies, which included speeches by Congressman John LaFalce, New York Department of Transportation Commissioner William C. Hennessy, and Niagara Falls Mayor Michael O'Loughlin. As the ceremony concluded, the eastbound Niagara Rainbow rolled into the station.

The Willard Road station posed challenges over its time in operation, especially as the years went on. Though serviceable, the station was built as a freight depot. Passengers on the Niagara Rainbow and later the Maple Leaf needed to walk some distance to board or detrain, since trains could not pull up to the building. Also the station was far from the downtown Niagara Falls core, which officials believe depressed ridership. The building is also located on the edge of a busy CSX (formerly LVRR and later Conrail) freight rail yard. As the station was the first U.S. station serving the Maple Leaf coming in from Canada, it was an international point of entry into the United States. The openness of the area around the station, a lack of a way to properly secure the area and the fact it was a mile into the country made it a less than an ideal location for a U.S. point of entry and Customs inspection location especially in a post September 11, 2001 world. The station also did not have the high level platforms of more modern facilities.

In 1987, the city of Niagara Falls began the planning on a project to establish a new station at the U.S. Customhouse, near the Whirlpool Rapids Bridge. State and local governments later got involved in the process of building the new multi-million dollar Niagara Falls Station and Customhouse Interpretive Center. U.S. Customs and Border Protection would share with Amtrak the complex consisting of the old customhouse and modern additions.

The project consisted of three phases, with a total estimated cost of $44 million. Construction on the project began in August 2010, with funding only for the first two phases.

In October 2010, the U.S. Department of Transportation released $16.5 million in funds from the Transportation Investment Generating Economic Recovery (TIGER) program for work on the final phase of the International Station project. The new station was completed in July 2016 and opened on December 6, 2016. The Willard Avenue station closed following the departure of the trains that morning. The last train, an eastbound Empire Service train pulled away from the station at 6:50am.

=== Post-Amtrak service ===
Today the station is used as an Amtrak facility to service trains and change crews as well as a place to turn around Empire Service Amtrak train sets to go eastbound after they back out from stopping at the Niagara Falls Station and Customhouse Interpretive Center.
