= Niagara Falls (New Zealand) =

Mānga Piri / Niagara Falls
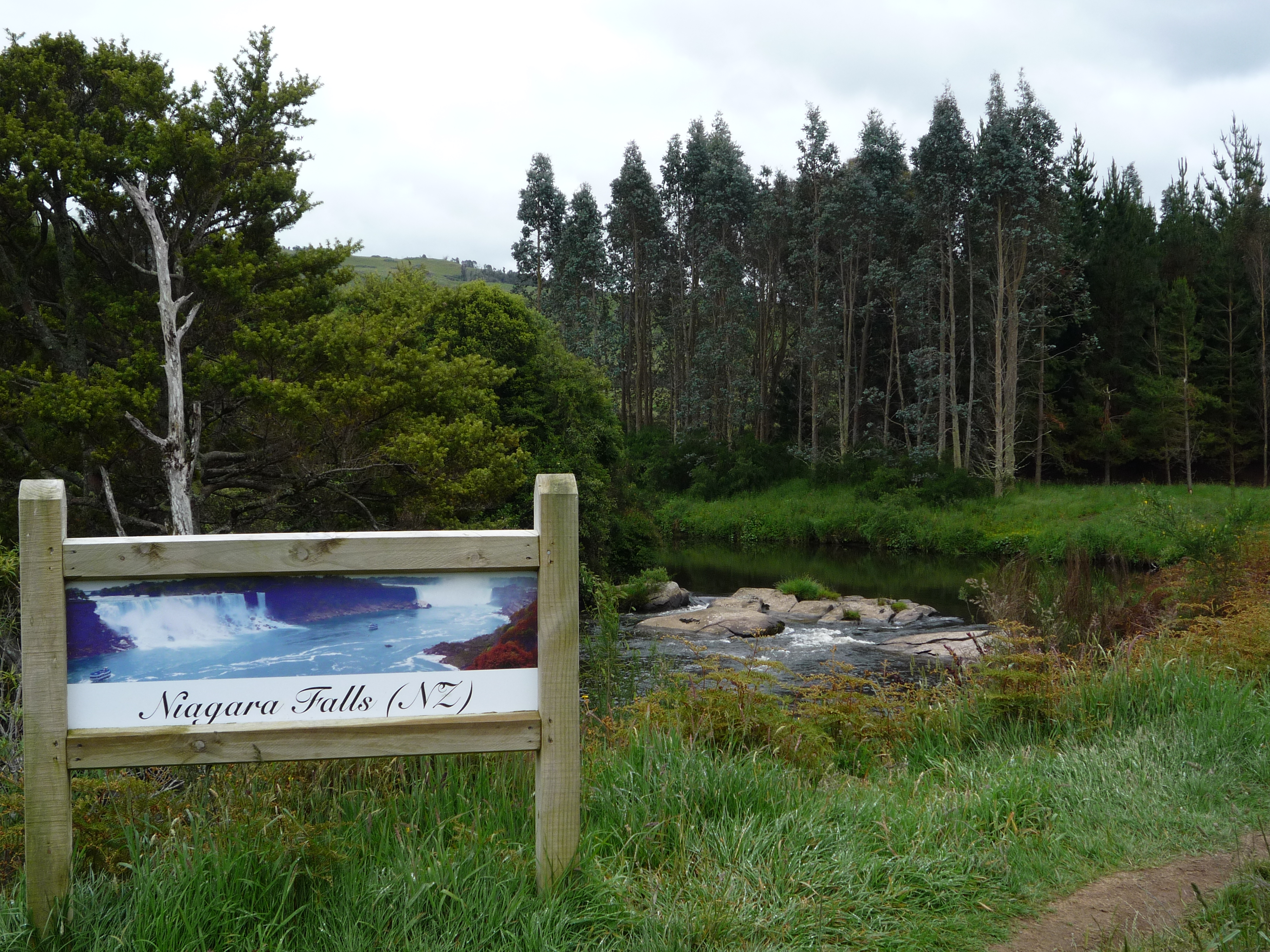
- Interactive map of Mānga Piri / Niagara Falls
- Location: The Catlins, Southland, New Zealand
- Coordinates: 46.594594°S 169.134576°E
- Type: Rapids
- Watercourse: Waikawa River

The Niagara Falls (Māori: Mānga Piri) are rapids of the Waikawa River on the South Island in New Zealand.

A surveyor named them ironically because the falls share little in resemblance with the Niagara Falls on the border between the US and Canada. They are rather considered to be the smallest falls in The Catlins. The falls are a potential spawning area for īnanga.
