= Niagara Falls (British Columbia) =

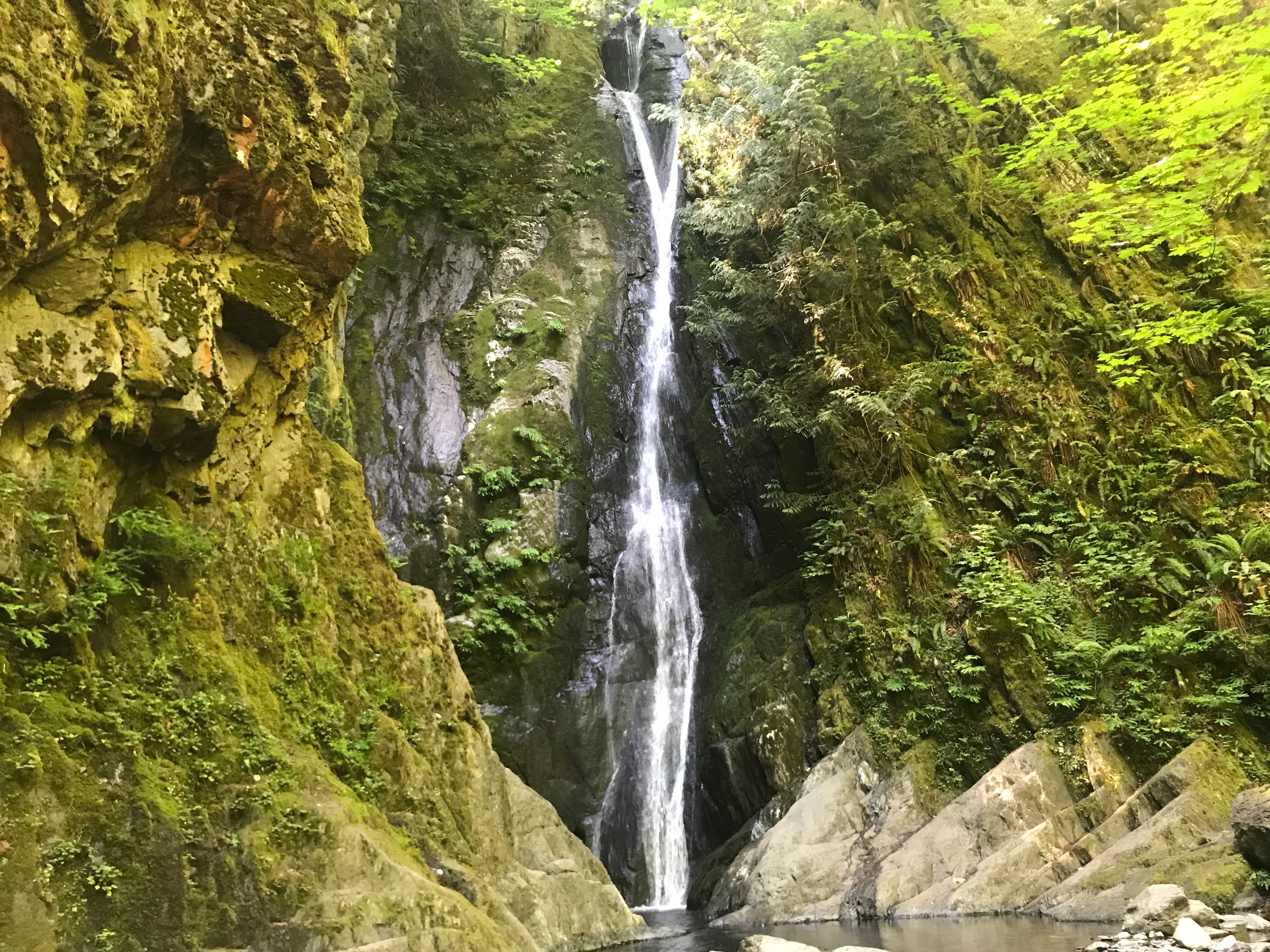
- Niagara Falls

- Location within British Columbia
- Location: Goldstream Park, near Langford, British Columbia, Canada
- Coordinates: 48°28′59.14″N 123°33′11.86″W
- Elevation: 44 m (144 ft)
- Total height: 43 m (141 ft)
- Number of drops: 1
- Average width: 1 m (3 ft 3 in)

Niagara Falls or Golden Niagara Falls is a waterfall in Niagara Canyon, part of Niagara Creek in Goldstream Park near Langford, British Columbia, Canada. It drops 47.5 metres (156 ft) down a narrow gully.

== See also ==
- List of waterfalls
- List of waterfalls in British Columbia
