= Niagara Falls station (New York) =

Train station in Niagara Falls, New York

Niagara Falls, NY
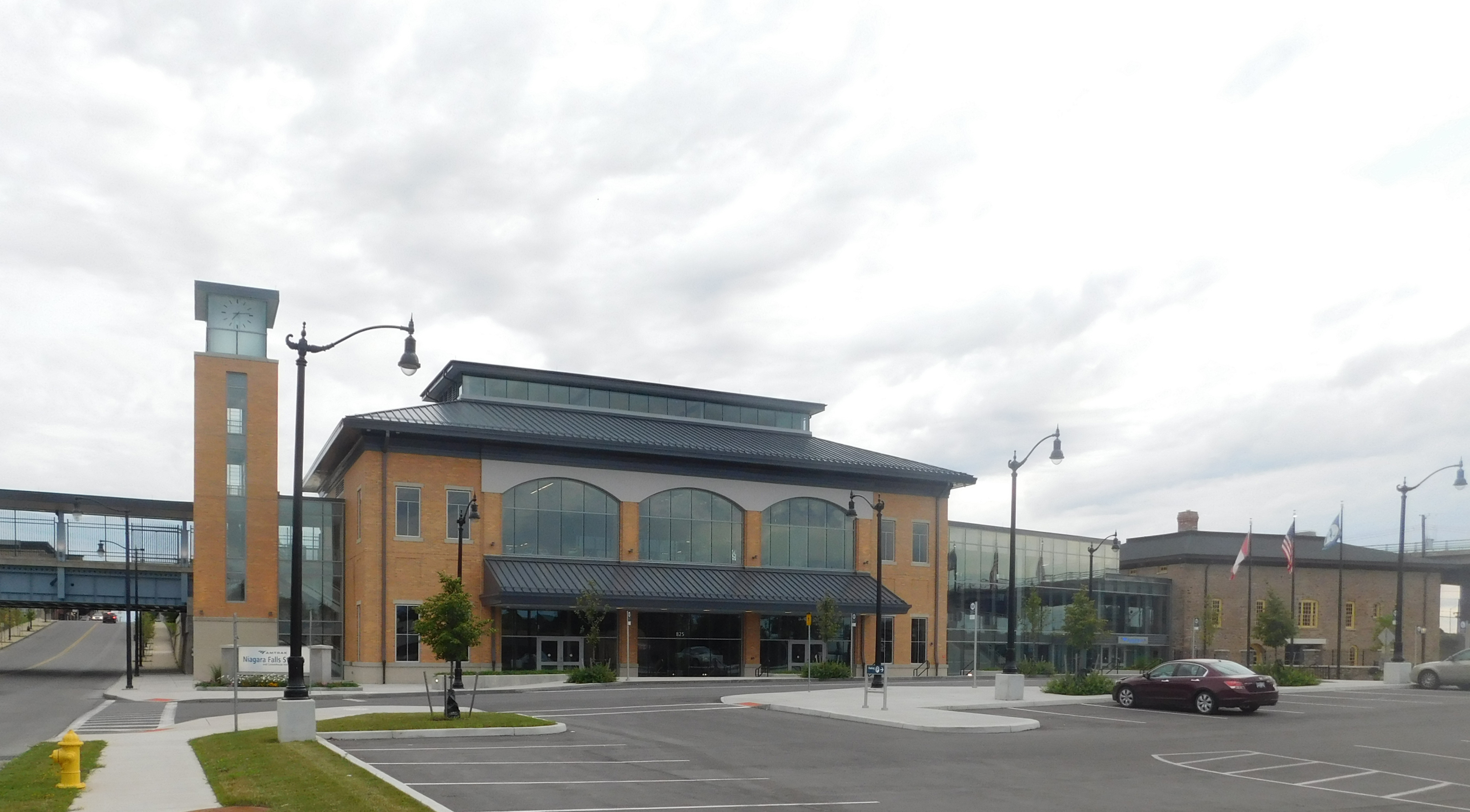
- The new station in July 2017

General information
- Other names: Niagara Falls Station and Customhouse Interpretive Center
- Location: 825 Depot Avenue West; Niagara Falls, New York; United States
- Coordinates: 43°06′35″N 79°03′19″W
- Owner: City of Niagara Falls
- Line: Empire Corridor (Niagara Subdivision)
- Platforms: 1 side platform
- Tracks: 2
- Train operators: Amtrak / VIA Rail
- Connections: NFTA: 52 North End Circulator; Discover Niagara Shuttle: Falls to the Fort

Construction
- Parking: Yes
- Cycle facilities: Yes
- Accessible: Yes

Other information
- Station code: Amtrak: NFL; Via Rail: NFNY; CBP Code: NIA

History
- Opened: December 6, 2016

Passengers
- FY 2025: 36,522 (Amtrak)

Services
Preceding station	Amtrak	Following station
Terminus	Empire Service	Buffalo–Exchange Street toward New York
Niagara Falls, Ontario toward Toronto	Maple Leaf	Buffalo–Exchange Street toward New York
Former services at
Suspension Bridge station
Preceding station	New York Central Railroad	Following station
Niagara Falls, Ontario (MC) toward Chicago	Michigan Central Railroad Main Line	Niagara Falls, New York toward Buffalo
Niagara Falls, New York Terminus	Falls Road	Sanborn toward Rochester
Preceding station	Canadian National Railway	Following station
Niagara Falls, Ontario toward Toronto	Niagara Falls – Toronto; Local stops	Terminus
Preceding station	Lehigh Valley Railroad	Following station
Terminus	Niagara Falls Branch	Niagara Falls, New York toward Depew
- U.S. Customhouse
- U.S. National Register of Historic Places
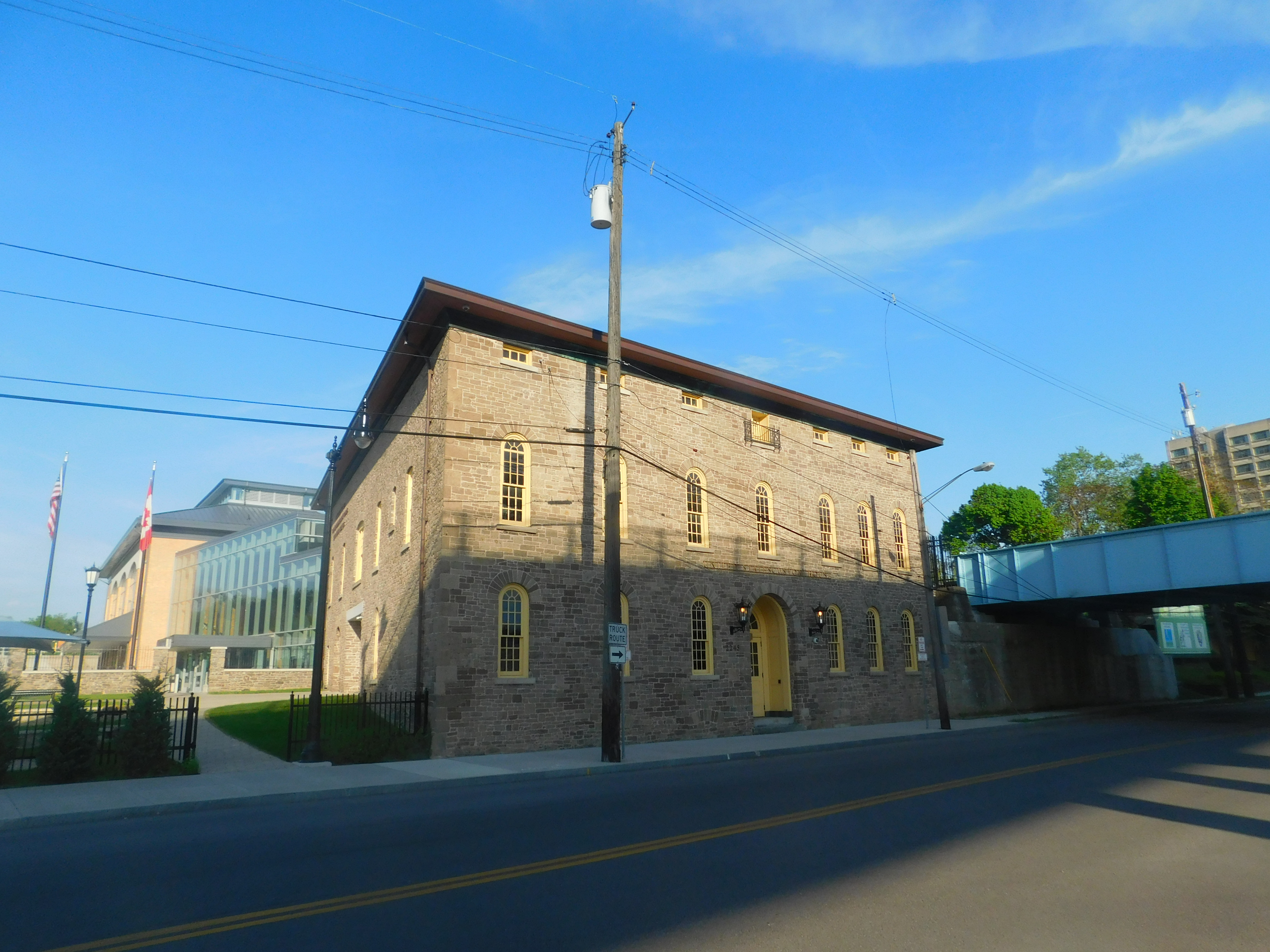
- U.S. Customhouse in May 2018 after construction of the railroad station.
- Location: 2245 Whirlpool Street, Niagara Falls, New York
- Area: less than one acre
- Built: 1863
- NRHP reference No.: 73001227
- Added to NRHP: July 16, 1973
Location

The Niagara Falls Station and Customhouse Interpretive Center is an intermodal transit complex in Niagara Falls, New York. It serves Amtrak trains and Niagara Frontier Transportation Authority buses, houses U.S. Customs and Border Protection offices servicing the Canada–United States border, and houses the Niagara Falls Underground Railroad Heritage Center.

It is the western terminus of Amtrak's Empire Corridor and serves two Empire Service trains in each direction (terminating westbound) and one Maple Leaf in each direction daily. The station also provides a connection to NFTA route 50 and the Discover Niagara Shuttle buses.

The facility consists of a complex built around the historic U.S. Customhouse, originally designed to service the U.S. side of the Niagara River border crossings from Canada. Completed in July 2016, the facility replaced Amtrak's former Niagara Falls station for passenger rail service on December 6, 2016.

From March 2020 to June 2022, Maple Leaf service west of the station was suspended indefinitely as part of a closure of the border to non-essential travel in response to the coronavirus pandemic, which made this station the western terminal of the route for that period.

== U.S. Customhouse ==
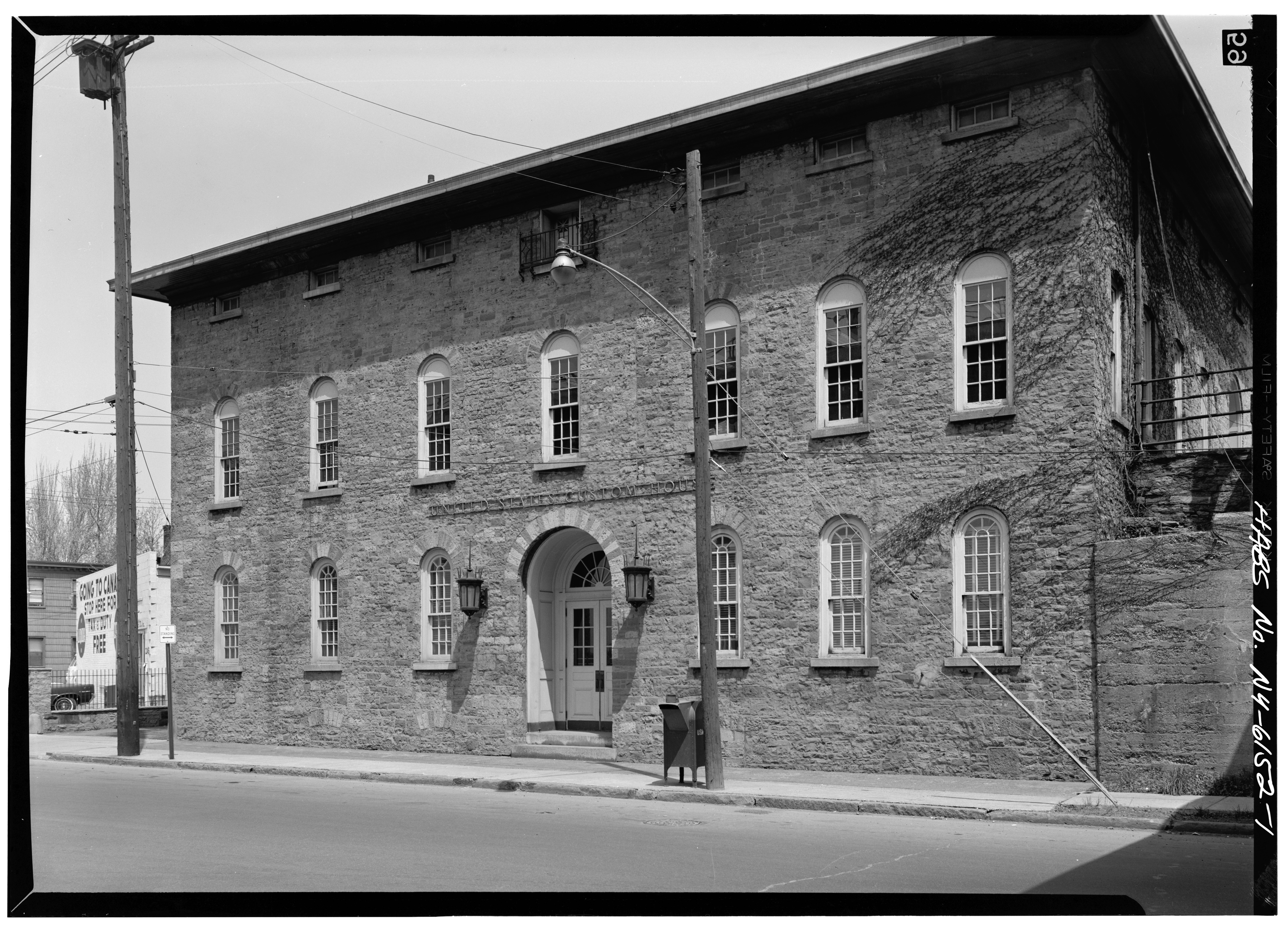
Whirlpool Street (West) Elevation, View Taken From Southwest

To handle the large amount of goods exchanged over the border, the Lewiston customs house—the primary customs for the Niagara region—was relocated from Lewiston, NY to the Niagara Suspension Bridge in 1863. The customhouse served inspectors for the Niagara Falls Suspension Bridge, Niagara Cantilever Bridge, Whirlpool Rapids Bridge, and Michigan Central Railway Bridge at various points in its history. With Niagara Falls receiving the second highest amounts of American imports at one point, the customhouse was once a very busy post for its inspectors. In 1911 the building was partially destroyed by fire but later rebuilt. Remaining in a US Customs capacity until the 1960s, it was sold to several different commercial owners before it was originally abandoned in 1998.

Added to the National Register of Historic Places in 1973, the building is now owned by the city of Niagara Falls who purchased it in 2003. State and local governments later incorporated the customhouse into plans to build a new multi-million dollar train station and intermodal transportation center called the Niagara Falls Station and Customhouse Interpretative Center. The customhouse was restored over a 5-year period and built into the station.

The second floor of the customhouse is occupied by U.S. Customs and Border Protection which uses it as a processing facility for passengers coming from Canada on the Maple Leaf. The first floor contains a museum on the Underground Railroad called the Niagara Falls Underground Railroad Heritage Center in honor of the former original bridge close by that took slaves from the United States into Canada in the 19th century. The museum opened May 2018 and includes such exhibits as "One More River to Cross" featuring the history of the Underground Railroad in Niagara Falls, the role played by the location and geography of Niagara Falls, and the actions of residents particularly African-American residents. Other exhibits include a recreation of the Cataract House, a Niagara Falls hotel that employed an entirely African-American wait staff, who helped numbers of former slaves to freedom in Canada and a recreation of the International Suspension Bridge, built in 1848, and rebuilt in 1855 to incorporate rail traffic, where Harriet Tubman and other former slaves crossed into Canada. The museum is sanctioned by the National Park Service as part of the Niagara Falls National Heritage Area.

== Train station ==
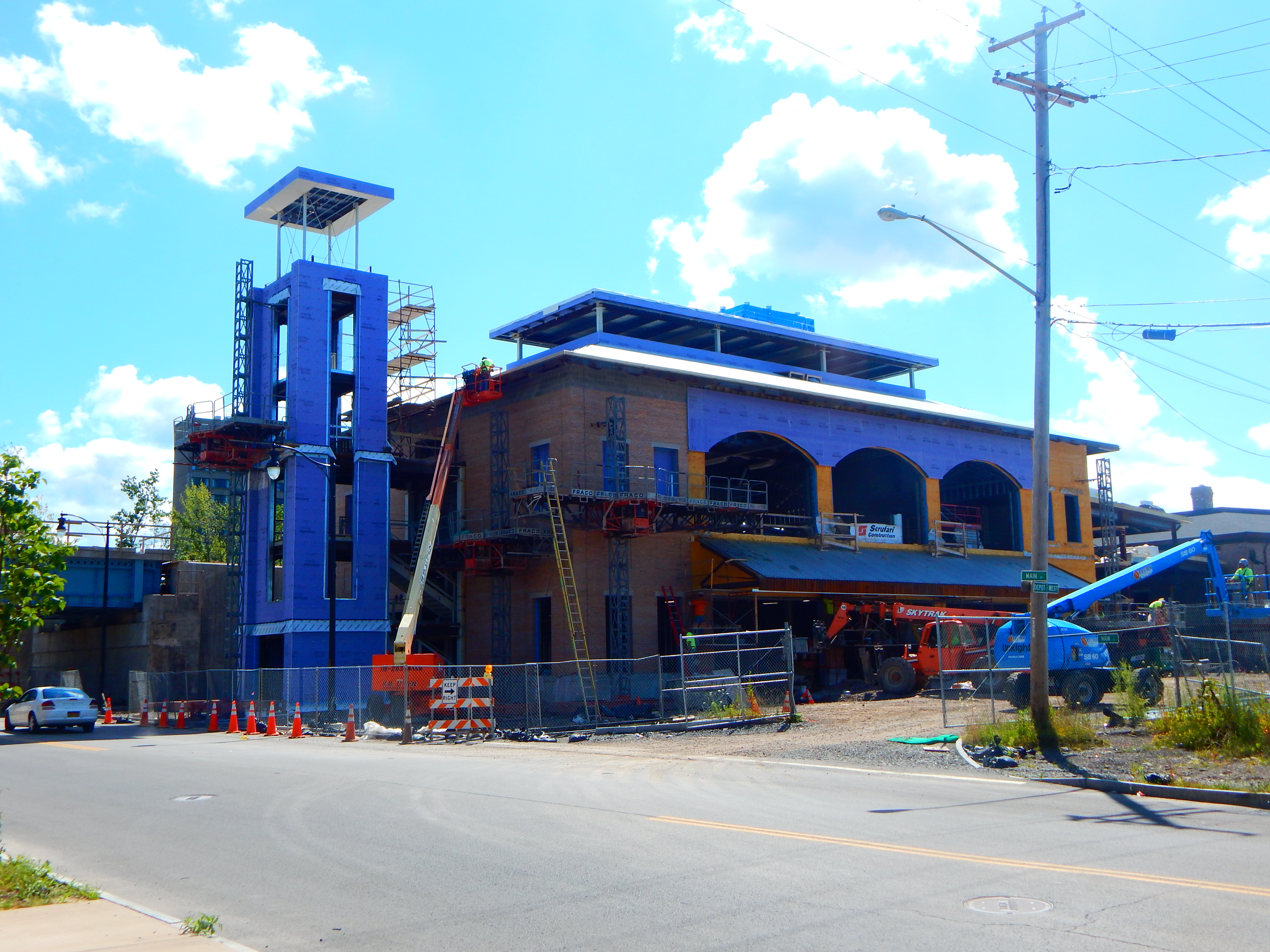
Station under construction in 2015

After 30 years of effort to move Amtrak's Niagara Falls station to the Customhouse location, the Niagara Falls Station and Customhouse Interpretive Center complex was constructed in a three-phase rebuilding project estimated to have cost $44 million. Construction on the project began in August 2010 and in October 2010, the US Department of Transportation released $16.5 million in funds from the TIGER program for work on the final phase of the International Station project.

A construction contract was agreed upon between the City of Niagara Falls and a local construction firm in April 2014 after delay over price overruns. Work began in May 2014. City officials said the construction would take 18 months to two years to complete. The project was completed in three phases including the stabilization of the existing customhouse building and upgrades to the nearby bridge. The station was completed in July 2016 and the completion was celebrated with a sneak peek of the station to the public during an event called "Niagara Falls Amtrak Community Day" on July 30, 2016.

After a delay in a contract agreement between the city and Amtrak, a 20-year lease was signed on November 9, 2016. Amtrak moved into the station on December 6, after the last train departed from the former Willard Avenue facility that morning.

It is hoped that the new station and its closer location to the downtown area of the city will help spur public and private sector growth in the city. The station was the first of four stations to be replaced along the Empire Corridor in New York in a five-year period. In addition to Niagara Falls, Rochester, Schenectady, and Buffalo–Exchange Street were all replaced between 2016 and 2020.

Niagara Falls officials have expressed interest in GO Transit expanding rail service over the border to the station and the station is designed to accommodate preclearance facility, hosting Canadian border staff. Metrolinx which runs GO Transit however has stated that there are specific restrictions when a train leaves Ontario, or any province in Canada, that require a different set of inspection criteria and standards in order to legally enter the United States which would make a stop at the station difficult. GO Transit currently stops at the Niagara Falls, Ontario station as it is part of the service's Lakeshore West line.

== Station layout ==
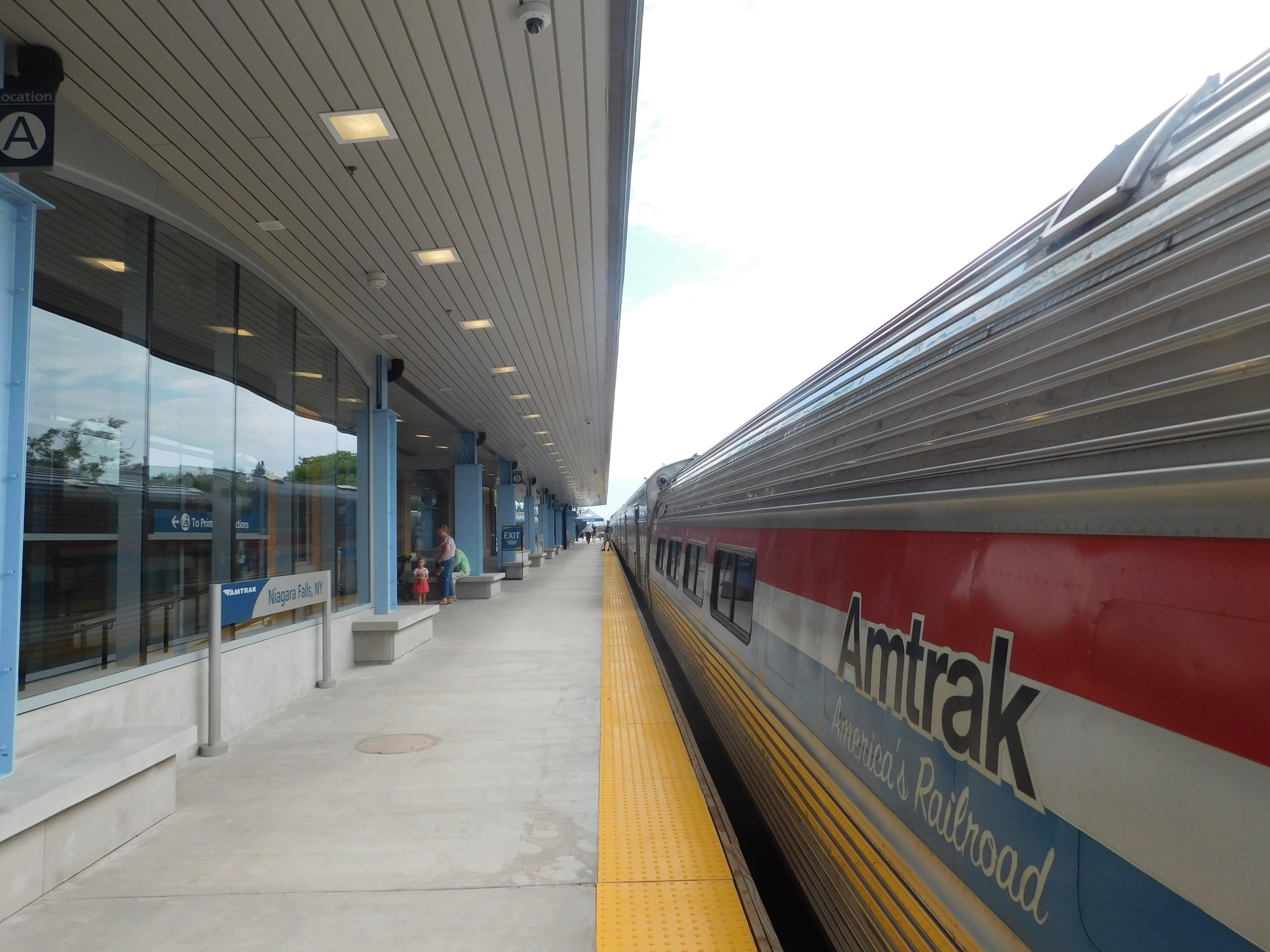
Platform at the Niagara Falls station

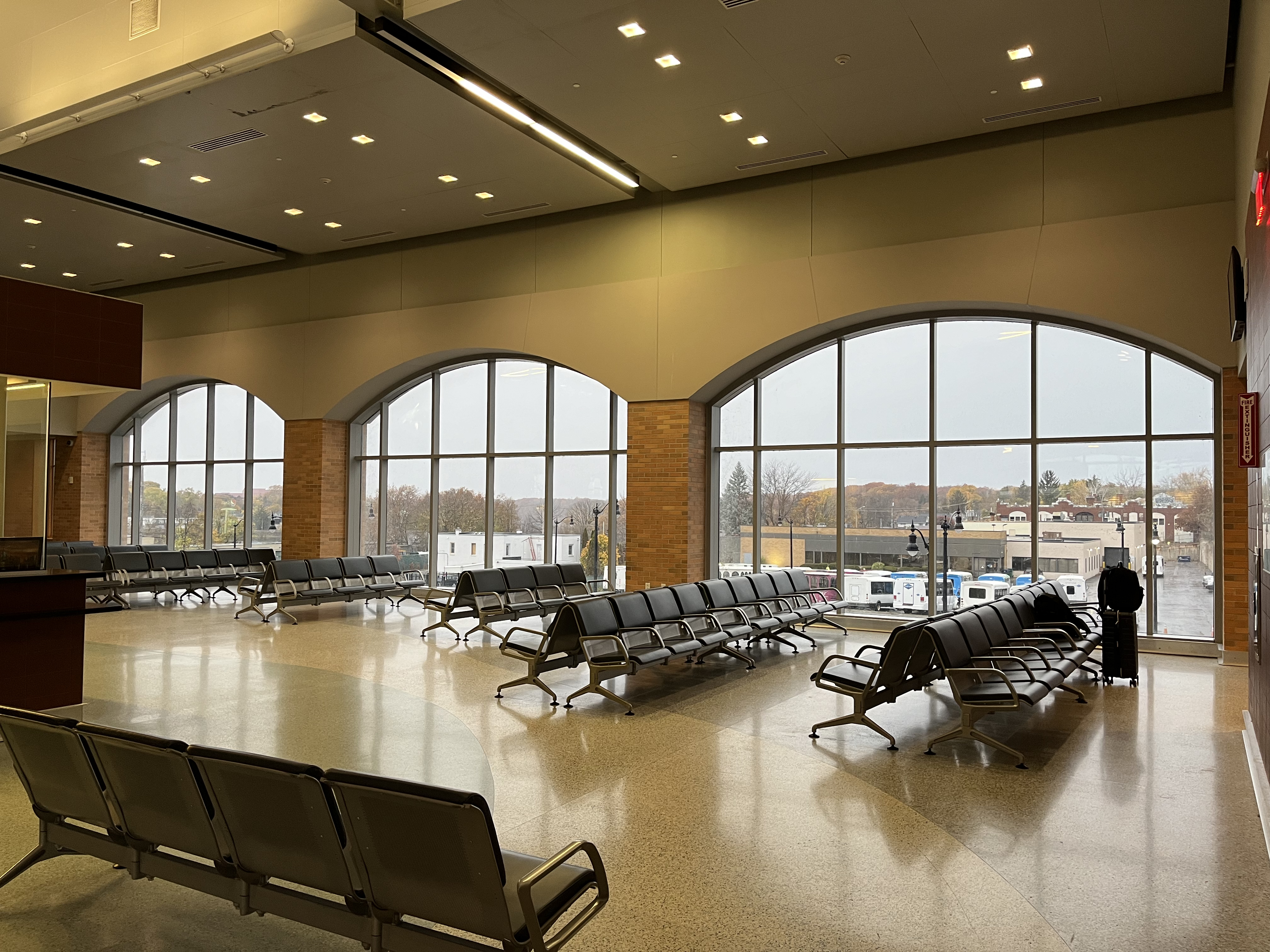
Station waiting room in 2023

Like the customhouse, the train station has two floors. The first floor at ground level contains the main concourse, an entrance to the museum in the customhouse and spaces for shops accessed from the outside. Ticketing, a waiting room, and boarding of the trains is on the second floor which is accessed by stairs and elevator. The lawn in front of the customhouse can be turned into a theater and interpretive area. Trains call at a single high-level side platform serving one track which is on an embankment.

=== Customs processing for the Maple Leaf ===
There are no pre-clearance facilities here or on the Canadian side. For passengers coming from Canada, U.S. Customs and Border Protection officers handle passengers with processing through the station. For passengers going to Canada, Canada Border Services Agency officers process those passengers on board the train at the Niagara Falls railway station in Niagara Falls, Ontario, just over the Whirlpool Bridge.

== See also ==
- U.S. Customhouse (disambiguation) – A list of other historic customhouses
