= Niagara Cantilever Bridge =

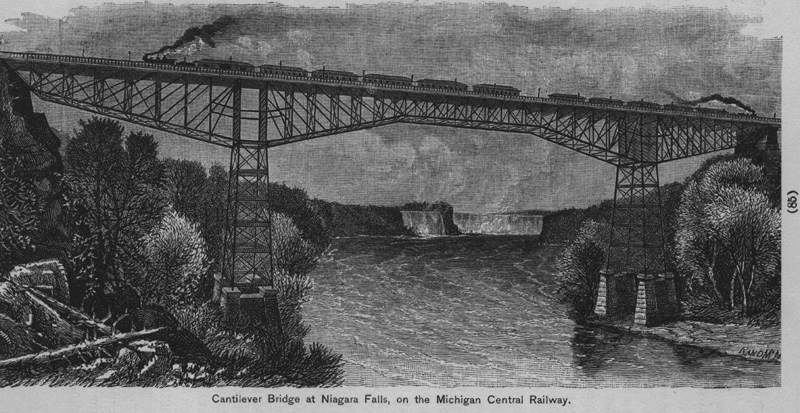
- 1895 guidebook engraving
- Coordinates: 43.108135°N 79.058604°W
- Carries: Michigan Central Railway/Canada Southern Railway and successors
- Crosses: Niagara Gorge
- Locale: Niagara Falls, New York, and Niagara Falls,
- Official name: Michigan Central Railway Cantilever Bridge
- Maintained by: Michigan Central Railway

Characteristics
- Design: Cantilever bridge
- Total length: 906 ft (276 m)
- Width: Double standard gauge (4 ft 8.5 in) track
- Clearance above: Deck cantilever truss, unlimited clearance
- Clearance below: appx 200 ft (60 m) above river

History
- Opened: 1883
- Closed: 1925

Location
- Interactive map of Niagara Cantilever Bridge

The Niagara Cantilever Bridge or Michigan Central Railway Cantilever Bridge was a cantilever bridge across the Niagara Gorge. An international railway-only bridge between Canada and the United States, it connected Niagara Falls, New York, and Niagara Falls, Ontario. It was replaced by the Michigan Central Railway Steel Arch Bridge in 1925.

== History ==
Michigan Central Railway commissioned the Niagara Cantilever Bridge as a more cost effective alternative to leasing from the Lower Arch Bridge. Charles Conrad Schneider, the architect, chose a cantilever design due to the geography of the Niagara Gorge. Construction began in 1883. Boston cement was used for the foundation. The bridge was completed within months as a deadline was imposed by the railway: the steel sections gained approximately 3.8 meters each day and the central section was built in a total of five days. When the bridge was finished, a crowd watched the final tests conducted by engineers and this was reported on by The New York Times. The bridge could handle two trains crossing simultaneously. The Niagara Cantilever Bridge became less useful as locomotives became heavier. Another steel arch was added in 1923 as an intermediate measure, with plans to replace the bridge entirely. When deconstructing the bridge, significant damage to the girders were noted, and the materials were scrapped.

== See also ==
- List of international bridges in North America
