= USS Niagara =

USS Niagara may refer to the following ships of the United States Navy:

- USS Niagara (1813), was a brig launched in 1813, and served as Oliver Hazard Perry's flagship during the Battle of Lake Erie. Sunk for preservation in 1820, she was raised in 1913 and rebuilt as US Brig Niagara for the 100th anniversary of the battle.
- USS Niagara (1855), was an American Civil War-era steam frigate launched in 1855 and sold in 1885
- USS Niagara (1898), was a steamer, built in 1877, and acquired by the US Navy in 1898 for service in the Spanish–American War and sold in 1899
- A submarine tender named Niagara was laid down in 1911 but renamed USS Fulton prior to completion
- USS Niagara (SP-246), was a motor boat built in 1913 and acquired by the US Navy for World War I in 1917, and served until 1919
- USS Niagara (SP-263), was a yacht built in 1915 and acquired by the US Navy in 1917 serving until 1922. She was later transferred to the US Coast Guard, reclassified as a USLHT, and renamed Poinsettia.
- USS Niagara (SP-136), was a yacht, built in 1898 and acquired by the US Navy in 1917 and converted into an armed patrol yacht. She was reclassified "PY-9" in 1920, and finally struck from the Naval Vessel Register in 1931.
- USS Niagara (PG-52), was a yacht built in 1929 as Hi-Esmaro. Acquired by the Navy in 1940 and sunk in battle on 22 May 1943
- USS Niagara (APA-87), was an amphibious assault ship which served from 1945 to 1950
