= Charles Conrad Schneider =

American civil engineer and bridge designer

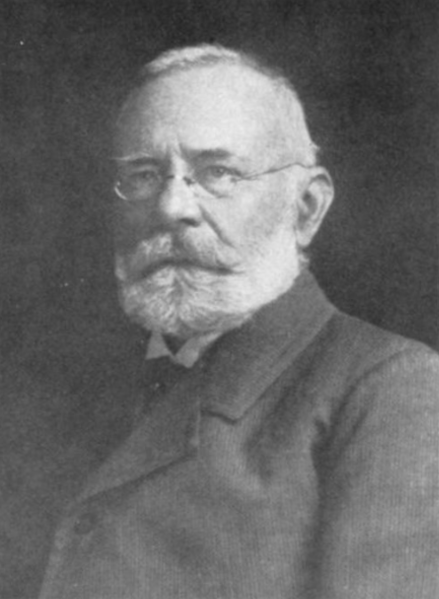
- Born: April 24, 1843; Apolda, Saxe-Weimar-Eisenach
- Died: January 8, 1916 (aged 72); Philadelphia, Pennsylvania
- Occupation: Civil Engineer
- Spouse: Katharine Clyde Winters (m. 1880)
- Awards: Norman Medal (1905, 1908)

Charles Conrad Schneider (German: Carl Conrad Schneider; April 24, 1843 – January 8, 1916), often referred to as C. C. Schneider, was an American civil engineer and bridge designer. Schneider was also a member and president of the American Society of Civil Engineers.

== Biography ==
Schneider was born in Apolda in the Grand Duchy of Saxe-Weimar-Eisenach. He graduated from the Royal Technical School at Chemnitz, Germany, in 1864, after which he worked as a mechanical engineer. He emigrated to the United States in 1867, where he worked for the Paterson Locomotive Works in New Jersey for four years before moving to Detroit to work for the Michigan Bridge and Construction Company. In 1875, he went to New York City to help review proposals for the Blackwell's Island Bridge across the East River (which would eventually be completed in 1909 and later came to be known as the Queensboro Bridge). While in New York, he met Charles Macdonald and worked with him for the next year at the Delaware Bridge Company.

He married Katharine Clyde Winters on January 8, 1880.

In 1883 he started his own civil engineering business in New York City. In 1885 he submitted a proposal for a bridge across the Harlem River north of High Bridge; his design was selected and opened in 1889 as the Washington Bridge.

He was one of the engineers that were involved in the erection of the Statue of Liberty in 1886. Among the many bridges, he designed and built, are the cantilever Fraser River bridge on the Canadian Pacific Railway, and the Niagara Cantilever Bridge. He was also involved in the 1906 construction of the Longteng Bridge in Taiwan, a development that was never finalized after its collapse from the 1935 Hsinchu earthquake. Schneider also was the head of the team investigating the first collapse of the Quebec Bridge in 1907, and in 1911 became a member of the board of engineers for the bridge.

He was vice president of the American Bridge Company from 1900 to 1903. In 1905 Schneider was named president of the American Society of Civil Engineers. He was twice awarded the Norman Medal which "recognizes a paper that makes a definitive contribution to engineering science," in 1905 and in 1908. About 1910 he ran an engineering office together with Frederick C. Kunz in Philadelphia.

Charles Conrad Schneider died in Philadelphia on January 8, 1916.

== Bridges and buildings ==
- Niagara Cantilever Bridge, Niagara Falls (New York) / Niagara Falls (Ontario), 1883
- CPR Bridge crossing the Fraser River at Cisco (Siska), 1884
- Washington Bridge, New York City, 1886
- Railway terminal, Jersey City, 1891

== Writings ==
- General Specifications for Railroad Bridges (1886)
- General Specifications for Highway Bridges (1901)
- General Specifications for Structural Steel Work in Buildings (1905; new ed., 1910)
