= List of North America Railway Hall of Fame inductees =

This is a list of the inductees of the North America Railway Hall of Fame.

The North America Railway Hall of Fame (NARHF) was founded in 1996 to maintain, preserve and honor railway history with the induction into the Hall of Fame of people, events, structures, railway art forms, rolling stock, technical innovations, railway workers and trains, and inventions all significant to the railway industry. It is housed at the historic Canada Southern Railway Station in St. Thomas, Ontario, Canada.

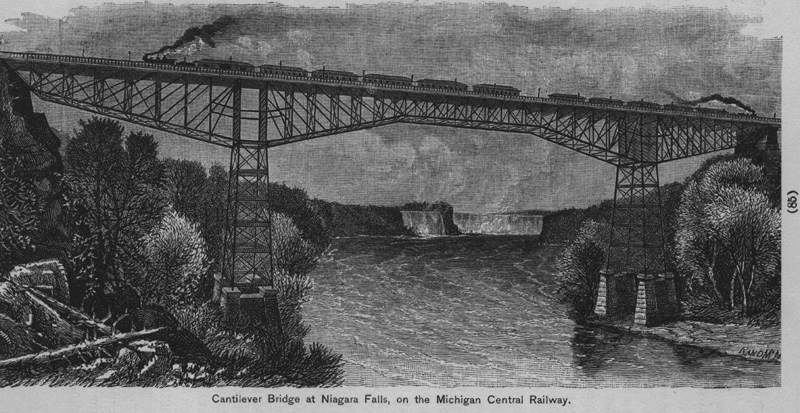
The Niagara Cantilever Bridge, ca. 1895, inducted in 2006

To understand the following list:

1. Nominations must fit the criteria of having contributed to the railway industry in a significant way on a:

- North American level,
- National level (specific to Canada) or a
- Local level (specific to St. Thomas, Ontario.)

2. Nominations must also be in the categories of:

- Railway Workers & Builders,
- Facilities and Structures,
- Technical Innovations,
- Rolling Stock,
- Railway Art Forms & Events, as well as
- Communities, Businesses, Governments & Groups

3. Anyone may make a nomination for the railway hall of fame. Nomination may be submitted by mail, email or through the hall of fame online submission form.

4. The selection committee makes their choices from all nominations submitted. The inductees are announced at a presentation ceremony at a date decided upon by the hall of fame.

In past years of induction ceremonies have taken place in 1999, 2001, 2006, 2008, 2010 and 2012.

== 1999 ==
Return to top of page

Inductee	Category	Significance	Notes
William Van Horne	Railway Worker & Builder	Nation	William Cornelius Van Horne was general manager, president, then chairman of the board of Canadian Pacific Railway, saw the Last Spike driven 1885. He made significant contributions to the railway in Canada.
Standard Time	Technical Innovations	National	Invented by Sir Sanford Fleming, Standard Time is a precision time keeping system based on dividing the world into 25 1-hour time zones.
The Dorchester	Rolling Stock	National	The first steam locomotive used in Canada.
Union Station (Toronto)	Facilities & Structures	National	Union Station (Toronto) in Toronto, Ontario is a significant transportation centre in Canada; owned and maintained by the Toronto Terminals Railway Company.
Cornelius Vanderbilt	Railway Workers & Builders	North America	Cornelius Vanderbilt was an influential railroad magnate of the 1800s. Owner of lines such as the New York Central Railroad & Michigan Central Railway as well as the Grand Central Terminal.
Westinghouse Air Brakes	Technical Innovations	North America	Westinghouse Air Brakes proved to be an incredible improvement over previous railway braking systems. They proved to be safer and more efficient.
Freight Cars	Rolling Stock	North America	Unpowered railway cars are called "Freight Cars" or "Goods wagons" in England/Europe and are designed to carry all forms of processed and unprocessed resources, goods or foods.
Grand Central Station	Facilities & Structures	North America	Grand Central Stations was built in 1871, the correct name of this New York City transportation centre built by Cornelius Vanderbilt is Grand Central Terminal.

== 2001 ==
Return to top of page

Inductee	Category	Significance	Notes
Perce Hankinson	Railway Workers & Builders	Local	Perce Hankinson worked in the railway industry for 68 years. He began with Michigan Central Railroad(MCR) and finished as directory of the Toronto, Hamilton and Buffalo Railway (TH&B.)
Jordan Spreader	Technical Innovation	Local	The Jordan Spreader is a multi-purpose piece of railway equipment.
Canada Southern Railway Station	Facilities & Structures	Local	At one time the Canada Southern Station was one of the busiest in Canada. It is unique in its large size an Italianate architectural style.
J.A. Killingsworth	Railway Art Forms & Events	Local	Killingsworth was local to St. Thomas, Ontario. where he was a fireman on the Michigan Central Railroad (MCR), manager of the St. Thomas Street Railway and chief clerk at the Pere Marquette Railway (PM), but Killingsworth legacy was with the poetry he wrote.
Sir John A. Macdonald	Railway Workers & Builders	National	Sir John A. Macdonald was Canada's first Prime Minister and influential in building the country through the railway.
Rotary snowplow	Technical Innovations	Local	Develop in the 1860s-80s in Ontario, Canada, the basis of the Rotary Snowplow is a large fan inside a wheel, mounted to the front of an engine.
The Toronto, No. 2	Rolling Stock	Nation	The Toronto, No. 2 was the first steam locomotive engine built in Canada.
Connaught Tunnel	Facilities & Structures	National	When built (between 1913 and 1916,) at 5.02 miles long, the Connaught Tunnel was the longest tunnel in Canada.
Sir Sanford Fleming	Railway Workers & Builders	North America	Sir Sanford Fleming was knighted in 1897. He was a Scottish-born, Canadian engineer and inventor whose remarkable achievements helped advance the Canadian railway industry.
Automatic Coupler	Technical Innovations	North America	The automatic coupler was invented by Eli H. Janney in 1873, eventually became a standard among railroads in North America.
The Mail Car	Technical Innovation	North American	As part of the post office the mail car increased the speed of mail processing/delivery by sorting mail whilst being transported.
Niagara Falls Suspension Bridge	Facilities & Structures	North America	Opened March 8, 1855, the Niagara Suspension Bridge carried the Great Western Railway and the Erie & Ontario Railway trains.
The Last Spike Ceremony (US)	Railway Art Forms & Events	North America	The Last Spike Ceremony (USA), (also known as the Golden Spike ceremony in the U.S. took place May 10, 1869 at Promontory Summit, Utah Territory when Leland Stanford drove the last spike to join the Central Pacific and the Union Pacific to make the First transcontinental railroad.

== 2006 ==
Return to top of page

Inductee	Category	Significance	Notes
Thomas William Cottrell	Railway Workers & Builders	Local	As a Master Mechanic, he brought locomotive repairs to St. Thomas, Ontario.
Jack Brumpton	Railway Workers & Builders	Local	Brumpton dedicated his life to the London and Port Stanley Railway (L&PS)and Pere Marquette Railway (PM) in St Thomas, Ontario.
James A. Bell	Railway Workers & Builders	Local	James A. Bell was a land surveyor, mapmaker, county engineer, and city engineer of St Thomas, Ontario. Bell was assistant engineer on the Niagara or MCR Cantilever Bridge.
Manufacture of the New York Central 1290 and 1291	Rolling Stock	Local	Steam locomotives 1290 & 1291 were constructed at the MCR Shops in St. Thomas, Ontario.
Kettle Creek Bridge	Facilities & Structures	Local	An impressive structure, the Kettle Creek Bridge, was built over the Kettle Creek Valley near the western limits of St. Thomas, Ontario. It was built in the 1870s with the first train passing over in mid-1873.
Jumbo Statue	Railway Art Forms & Events	Local	The Jumbo statue in St. Thomas is a magnificent monument to the death of Jumbo the Elephant of the Barnum and Bailey Circus who was killed by a train in St. Thomas, Ontario in 1885.
Donald Smith	Railway Workers & Builders	National	Donald Smith helped found the Canadian Pacific Railway (CPR.) When the railroad was completed in 1885, Smith was given the honour of driving the last spike at a ceremony at Craigellachie, British Columbia.
Computerized Traffic Control	Technical Innovations	National	Computerized Traffic Control is the used of machines and electronics/computerized equipment to regulate rail traffic.
Alfred E. Perlman	Railway Workers & Builders	North America	Alfred E. Perlman was the innovative president of New York Central Railroad and then the Penn Central Transportation Company.
Timken Roller Bearing Axle Box	Technical Innovations	North America	The development of the Timken Roller Bearing Axel Box was responsible for an increase in safety and efficiency.
Caboose	Rolling Stock	North America	The Caboose is a multi-purpose car always positioned last on trains, and was, in many cases, replaced with sensor boxes called "end-of-train devices" or EOT's.
MCR Cantilever Bridge	Facilities & Structures	North America	Under the control of Cornelius Vanderbilt, the MCR Niagara Cantilever Bridge was built in 1883 for $700,000.
"I've Been Working on the Railroad"	Railway Art Forms & Events	North America	"I've Been Working on the Railroad", known to adults and children alike, was derived from the "Levee Song," and has become an iconic piece of railway musical culture.

== 2008 ==
Return to top of page

Inductee	Category	Significance	Notes
Alton V. Johnson	Railway Workers & Builders	Local	Alton V. Johnson, born in St. Thomas, Ontario, began working at the Bridge and Building (B&B) Department of the Canadian National Railway in St. Thomas, Ontario in 1927 and eventually was appointed the Chief Engineer of CNR.
St. Thomas - Railway Capital of Canada	Community, Business, Government and Groups	Local	Beginning in the nineteenth century, the city was a hub for a number of prominent railways, linking the American industrial east with the agriculture of the west.
London and Port Stanley Railway(L&PS)	Community, Business, Government and Groups	Local	The London and Port Stanley Railway (L&PS) opened for business on September 25, 1856. The 24 mile line connected London, St. Thomas and Port Stanley, Ontario, and was used to carry goods and people.
MCRR St. Thomas Car Shops	Facility & Structures	Local	The MCRR Car Shops in St. Thomas built freight & passenger cars, then due to the efforts of Thomas William Cottrell repaired and eventually built locomotives. (The Shops were located on the same 309 acre package of land that was bought to build the Canada Southern Railway Station on and also housed two Three-Motor Overhead Bridge Cranes, also inducted into the hall of fame.)
Sinking of the SS Marquette and Bessemer No. 2	Railway Art Forms & Events	Local	The rail car ferry SS Marquette and Bessemer No. 2 ran between Conneaut, Ohio and Port Stanley, Ontario. It left Conneaut December 9, 1909 and never to reach its destination.
Robert Bandeen	Railway Workers & Builders	National	Robert Bandeen began his career with Canadian National Railway in 1955 as an economist. He served as president and CEO from 1974 to 1982. This and other accomplishments garnered his nomination.
Chinese Workers	Railway Workers & Builders	National	In the early 1880s about 17,000 Chinese workers came to Canada to work on the treacherous railroad route between Port Moody and Eagle Pass in British Columbia. They took on many hardships to make the railway a reality.
Intl. Brotherhood of Locomotive Engineers & Trainmen, Division 70	Community, Business, Government and Groups	National	The Brotherhood of Locomotive Engineers & Trainmen, Division 70, formed in Toronto, Ontario in 1865, two years after the group's initial formation in Marshall, Michigan on May 8, 1863.
Oil-Electric Locomotive	Technical Innovations	National	The Oil-Electric Locomotive, the first practical internal combustion electric locomotive, made its historic run from Montreal to Toronto on September 26, 1929.
Banff Springs Hotel	Facilities & Structures	National	The Banff Springs Hotel, in Banff National Park, Alberta, Canada was built as part of a series of magnificent railway hotels by the Canadian Pacific Railway.
Gordon Lightfoot's Canadian Railroad Trilogy	Railway Art Forms & Events	National	Gordon Lightfoot's Canadian Railroad Trilogy was commissioned in 1967 by the Canadian Broadcasting Corporation to help celebrate the Canadian Centennial.
Chief Crowfoot	Railway Workers & Builders	North America	Chief Crowfoot was one of the chiefs of the Blackfoot Confederacy in western Canada, Crowfoot helped facilitate the completion of the railway across the country, while simultaneously helping his people.
Brotherhood of Sleeping Car Porters and Redcaps	Community, Business, Government and Groups	North America	The Brotherhood of Sleeping Car Porters and Redcaps was a significant force in the labour and civil rights movements in the U.S.A. In 1935, they became the first labour organization led by African-Americans to receive a charter in the American Federation of Labor.
Tom Thumb	Technical Innovations	North America	Built in 1830, Tom Thumb was the first American built steam locomotive to operate on a common railroad line. It was built, in part, to prove that a steam locomotive was better than horse-drawn rail cars.
St. Clair Tunnel	Facilities & Structures	North America	Construction on the St. Clair Tunnel was completed in 1891 and ran between Sarnia, Ontario, Canada and Port Huron, Michigan, in the United States. It was the first international railway tunnel and the first built under a river.
Wabash Cannonball (Song)	Railway Art Forms & Events	North America	The Wabash Cannonball is a railway song with folk and country music trappings, originating with the hobos who rode the rails. It was at its peak in popularity in the 1930s when Roy Acuff's recording of it sold 1 million copies.

== 2010 ==
Return to top of page

Inductee	Category	Significance	Notes
Peter Laing	Railway Workers & Builders	Local	Peter Laing was a railway worker with the Michigan Central Railroad and the New York Central Railroad in St. Thomas, Ontario, as well as a local politician (Mayor, two terms)
Thomas Currah	Railway Workers & Builders	Local	A veteran of World War I, Thomas Currah was a railway worker with the Michigan Central Railroad and the New York Central Railroad in St. Thomas, Ontario, as well as a local politician, most notably as Mayor.
Donald Broadbear	Railway Workers & Builders	Local	A man of extensive and varied experience, Don Broadbear is known in southwestern Ontario for his accomplishments.
Charity Helpmate Lodge # 37 (Lady Fireman)	Community, Business, Government & Groups	Local	The Ladies’ Society was founded in St. Thomas, Ontario in 1899. The Lodge was organized assist and encourage the Brotherhood of Locomotive Firemen and Enginemen in its works of charity and elevating our social and intellectual standing.
St. Thomas Railway Themed Murals	Railway Art Forms & Events	Local	Railway themed murals throughout the City of St. Thomas, Ontario celebrate its railway heritage.
Robert Clark	Railway Workers & Builders	National	Local to St. Thomas, Ontario, Robert Clark became a figure of national importance to the railway in Canada.
Canada Division Passenger Service	Community, Business, Government & Groups	National	At the turn of the 20th century, the Canada Division Passenger Service, the Canada Division main line was the busiest passenger route in Canada.
Ontario, Simcoe and Huron Railway	Community, Business, Government & Groups	National	The Ontario, Simcoe and Huron Union Railroad Company (OS&H) linked the upper and lower Great Lakes by rail for the first time.
The TurboTrain	Rolling Stock	National	This early high-speed, gas turbine train operated in Canada between 1968 and 1982. It was one of the first gas turbine powered trains for passenger traffic. Its speed once peaked at 167 mph near Gananoque, Ontario.
Glencoe station Restoration	Facilities & Structures	National	Situated at 151 McRae Street, Glencoe, Ontario, the Glencoe Station was originally built in 1854 as a stop on the Great Western Railway. It has been rebuilt many times since then. The restoration of this station is significant to maintaining our railway heritage.
"New York Central’s Canadian Streamliners"	Railway Art Forms & Events	National	A definitive text: New York Central’s Canadian Streamliners: A History of the New York-Detroit-Chicago Passenger Trains in the 19th and 20th Centuries’ by Douglas N.W. Smith.
Perley A. Thomas	Railway Workers & Builders	North America	From Chatham, Ontario Perley Thomas made his unique contribution in the design and construction of street railway cars.
Webb C. Ball & The Railwayman's Watch	Railway Workers & Builders	North America	Webb Ball made "railway time" synonymous with "precision time."
Johnny Cash	Railway Art Forms & Events	North America	Johnny Cash was an immensely popular American country singer-songwriter whose music was closely identified with the railroad.

== 2012 ==
Return to top of page

Inductee	Category	Significance	Notes
Donald F. Graham	Railway Workers & Builders	Local	Donald F. Graham was the last New York Central Railroad (NYC) executive to work in the Canada Southern Railway Station building.
The Cosens Brothers	Railway Workers & Builders	Local	The three Cosens brothers (Dolph, George & Alfred) each had long careers with the railways.
South Western Traction Line	Community, Business, Government & Groups	Local	The company used unique as it was the only one in North America to use a three-phase AC electric overhead traction system. The company was, however, relatively short-lived.
Southern Loan & Savings	Community, Business, Government & Groups	Local	Originally incorporated as the Southern Counties Permanent Building, The Southern Loan & Savings Co. in St. Thomas, Ontario was initiated by local businessmen. Their building was designed by noted Canadianl architect Neil Darrach (b. St. Thomas.)
Canadian Iron & Foundry Co.	Community, Business, Government & Groups	Local	Built in the 1870s, the Russell Car Wheel, in St. Thomas on Canada Southern Railway property, was bought by Canadian Iron & Foundry after financial difficulties and eventually became Canron.
Port Stanley Terminal Rail	Community, Business, Government & Groups	Local	The Port Stanley Terminal Railway, between Port Stanley and St. Thomas, Ontario is a tourist line that was built by volunteers and travels over the tracks of one of Ontario's oldest railways - the London and Port Stanley Railway.
Railway Hospital Association	Community, Business, Government & Groups	Local	
Iron Horse Festival	Railway Art Forms & Events	Local	St. Thomas, Ontario has celebrated its railway heritage with the annual Iron Horse Festival.
MCR Employee Band	Railway Art Forms & Events	Local	The MCR Employee Band was formed by the Michigan Central Railroad employees in St. Thomas, Ontario.
Larry Krupa	Railway Workers & Builders	National	Larry Krupa, at the time brakeman on the Canadian Pacific Railway is considered a national hero when his quick thinking and actions saved a railway accident in 1979 near Mississauga, Ontario from having larger, more devastating consequences.
Restoration of 6167 - City of Guelph	Community, Business, Government & Groups	National	The restoration of the steam locomotive 6167 by the City of Guelph, Ontario.
The Re-Purposing of the Sarnia Bridge - City of St. Mary's	Community, Business, Government & Groups	National	This historic viaduct was re-purposed as part of the Grand Trunk Trail.
The Ocean Limited	Rolling Stock	National	Ocean Limited operated by Via Rail between Montreal and Halifax, Nova Scotia, is currently the oldest continuously operating named passenger train in North America.
John St. Roundhouse	Facilities & Structures	National	Toronto, Ontario
Fred Eaglesmith	Railway Art Forms & Events	National	This entertainer is from near Brantford, Ontario and has entertained for decades with his railway themed music.
American Radiator Company	Community, Business, Government & Groups	North America	Found in the Canada Southern Railway Station, the American Radiator Company help change the comfort level of North America.
Three-Motor Overhead Bridge Crane	Technical Innovations	North America	J.H. Whiting's Three-Motor Overhead Bridge Crane built in 1898, allowed workers to carry large pieces of railroad equipment, including locomotives, inside a car shop.
PRR 4800 - "Old Rivets"	Rolling Stock	North America	Electric locomotive PRR 4800 or "Old Rivets" was built in 1934 by General Electric and was capable of speeds of 100 mph.
Rocky Mountain Express - Film	Railway Art Forms & Events	North America	IMAX's large format film was the perfect medium for this story of building the Canadian Pacific Railway in Stephen Low's Rocky Mountain Express.
