= Pennsylvania Railroad 4800 =

Preserved PPR GG1 electric locomotive

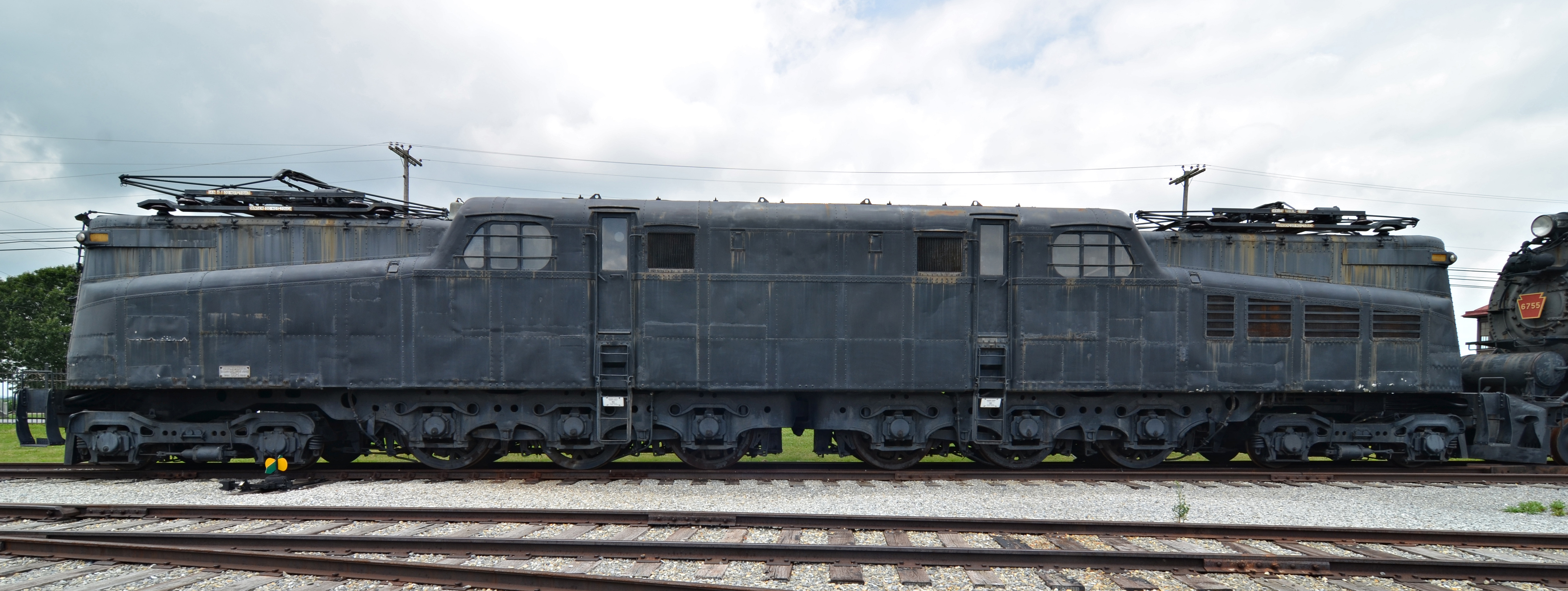
- 4800 at the Railroad Museum of Pennsylvania in June 2010
Type and origin
- Power type: Electric
- Builder: Baldwin Locomotive Works, General Electric
- Serial number: GE 11646
- Build date: August 1934
Specifications
- Configuration
  - AAR: 2-C+C-2
- Gauge: 4 ft 8 1/2 in (1,435 mm) standard gauge
- Driver dia.: 57 in (1,448 mm)
- Wheelbase: 13 ft 8 in (4.17 m)
- Length: 79 ft 6 in (24.23 m)
- Width: 10 ft 4 in (3.15 m)
- Height: 16 ft 0 in (4.88 m) over locked-down pantograph
- Adhesive weight: 303,000 lb (137,000 kg)
- Loco weight: 475,000 lb (215,000 kg)
- Electric system/s: 11,000 V AC, 25 Hz Overhead
- Current pickup: Dual pantographs
Performance figures
- Maximum speed: 100 mph (160 km/h)
- Power output: Continuous: 4,620 hp (3,450 kW)
Career
- Operators: Pennsylvania Railroad, Penn Central, Conrail
- Class: GG1
- Numbers: PRR 4800
- Nicknames: Old Rivets
- Retired: October 1979
- Restored: November 20, 1982 (cosmetically)
- Current owner: Pennsylvania Historical and Museum Commission
- Disposition: On static display

Historic Mechanical Engineering Landmark
- Official name: Penn. RR GG1 Electric; Locomotive #4800
- Designated: April 23, 1983
- Reference no.: 83

Pennsylvania Railroad 4800, nicknamed "Old Rivets", is a GG1 class electric locomotive located at the Railroad Museum of Pennsylvania, outside of Strasburg, Pennsylvania in the United States. It is the prototype GG1 and was originally numbered 4899. Built by General Electric in 1934, the locomotive competed against a prototype, the R1, built by rival company Westinghouse. 4800 was kept in service by the Pennsylvania Railroad and its successors, Penn Central and Conrail, until 1979. It was sold the next year to a local chapter of the National Railway Historical Society. 4800 was dedicated in 1982 at the Railroad Museum of Pennsylvania and was designated a Historic Mechanical Engineering Landmark in 1983.

== Construction and testing ==
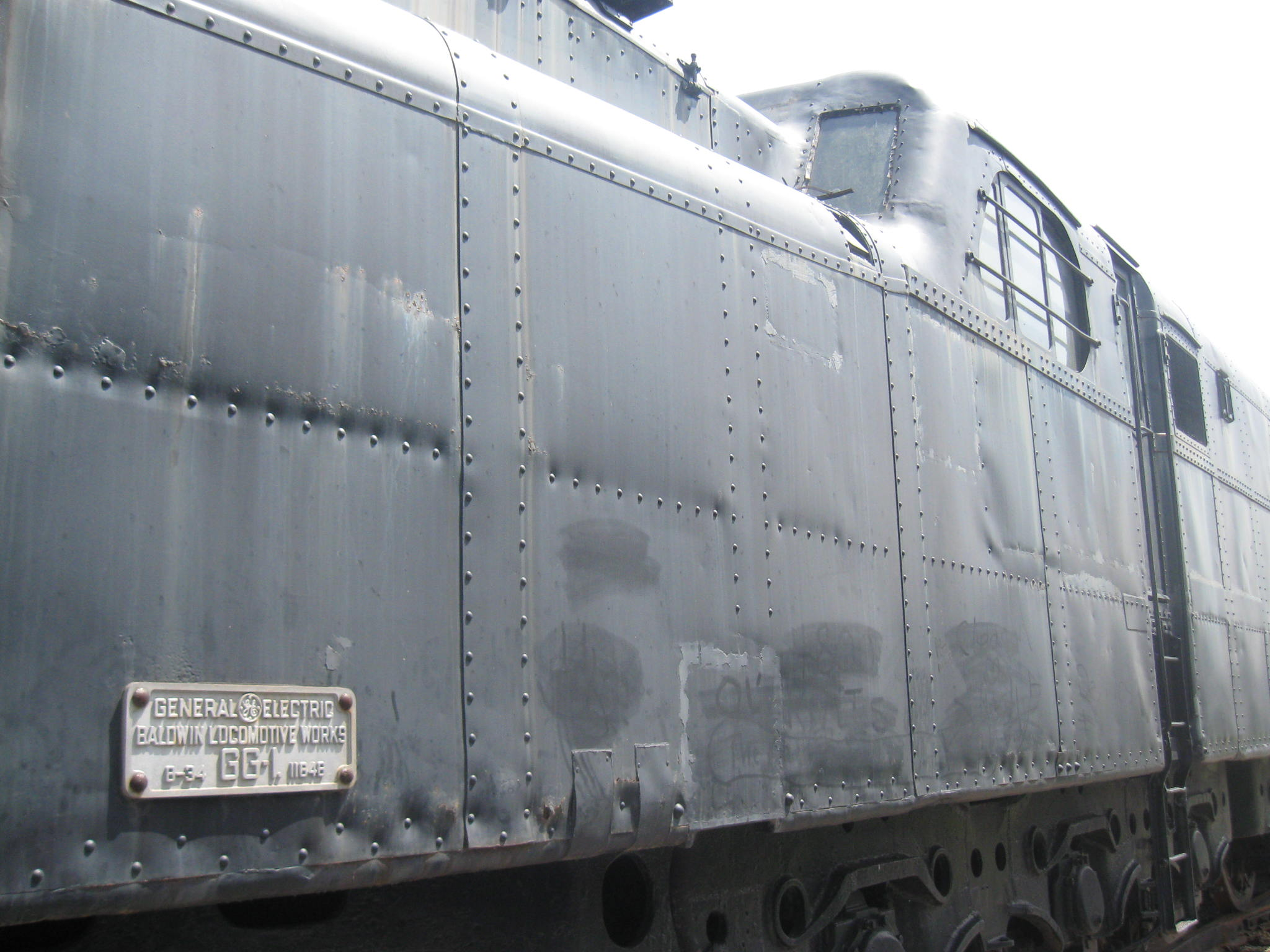
Detail of PRR 4800 showing the builder's plate

In 1933, the Pennsylvania Railroad decided to replace the P5, and instructed General Electric and Westinghouse to design an electric locomotive that was more powerful than the P5, capable of speeds of 100 miles per hour (161 km/h), have a lighter axle load and to be double-ended with a cab in the center of the carbody. Westinghouse designed the R1 #4800, and General Electric submitted the GG1, then numbered 4899.

The frames, running gear, and riveted body for the prototype GG1 were built by Baldwin Locomotive Works. The partially built locomotive was then shipped to the General Electric factory in Erie, Pennsylvania for the installation of its electrical components. Twelve traction motors, two on each of the GG1's six powered axles, produced 4,620 horsepower (3,450 kW) that was transmitted to the 57-inch (1,400 mm) driving wheels by a quill drive. Unlike other GG1s, access steps were installed at each end of the locomotive to ease maintenance of the pantographs; the pantographs were mechanically linked to a safety plate that blocked access to the steps when the pantographs were raised. The finished locomotive was 79 feet 6 inches (24.23 m) long and 16 feet (4.88 m) tall, with both of its pantographs lowered.

GG1 4899 was extensively tested against the R1 from August to November 1934; both locomotives were substituted on regular passenger service between New York City and Philadelphia. Both locomotives were found to be capable of rapid acceleration with short-term power outputs of up to 10,000 horsepower (7,500 kW). The GG1, however, did not exert as much lateral force on the rails as the R1, because it was articulated, which allowed for a smaller turning radius than the rigid R1. The Pennsylvania chose the GG1 over the R1 and immediately ordered another 57 locomotives. As the number scheme used by the Pennsylvania prevented the first locomotive in the class from being 4899, the R1 and GG1 prototypes essentially swapped numbers. The Pennsylvania also enlisted the assistance of Raymond Loewy to refine the aesthetics of the GG1s. Loewy recommended that all subsequent models of the class should have a welded body rather than the riveted body on the prototype. This led to the nickname "Old Rivets" being given to 4800.

== Operation and preservation ==
On January 28, 1935, 4800 inaugurated electric passenger service between Washington, D.C., and Philadelphia by pulling a charter train for railroad and government officials; 4800 set a speed record of 102 miles per hour (164 km/h) outside of Landover, Maryland on the return trip. Regular passenger service began on February 10, 1935. 4800 remained in regular passenger service with the Pennsylvania, until it joined production GG1s 4801–4857 in the pool of 90-mile-per-hour (140 km/h) geared freight locomotives. It had its steam generator removed in June 1960, about a year after hauling a National Railway Historical Society-charted excursion to commemorate its 25th birthday.

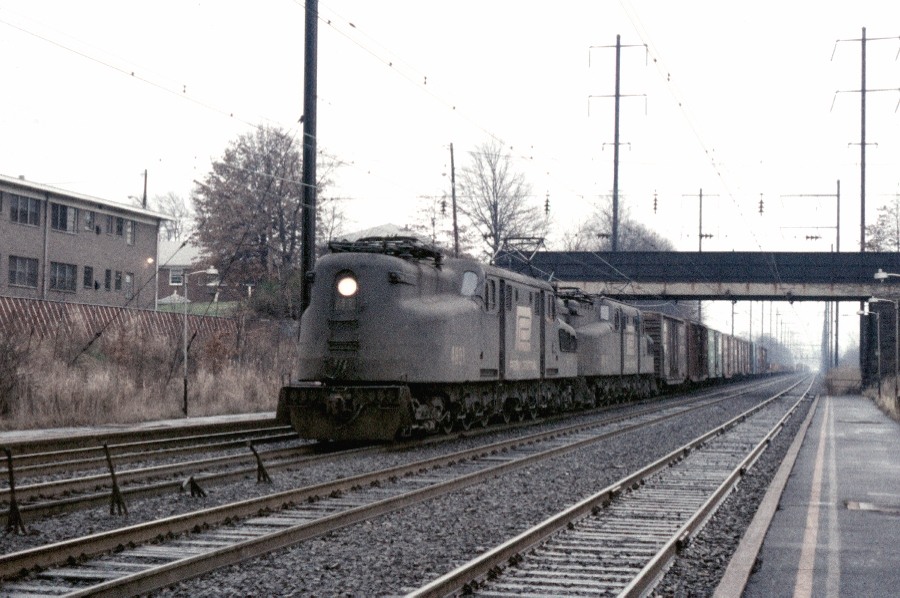
Penn Central 4801 and 4800 eastward at North Elizabeth in December 1975

4800 continued to haul freight for the Pennsylvania and its successors Penn Central and Conrail. In 1976, Conrail gave 4800 a red, white, and blue paint scheme to commemorate the United States Bicentennial. It was also the only GG1 to wear Conrail's iconic blue paint; all the other Conrail GG1s remained in black. 4800 was eventually retired by Conrail in October 1979 after the locomotive's main transformer failed, which was deemed too expensive to repair.

4800 was sold by Conrail in 1980 to the Lancaster chapter of the National Railway Historical Society for the scrap-value price of $30,000. The locomotive was given a cosmetic restoration back to its 1935 appearance by the nearby Strasburg Rail Road and volunteers. 4800 was dedicated and put on display at the Railroad Museum of Pennsylvania on November 20, 1982. It was designated a Historic Mechanical Engineering Landmark by the American Society of Mechanical Engineers (ASME) on April 23, 1983.

In 2012, PRR 4800 was inducted into the North America Railway Hall of Fame for its contribution to the railway industry.

The locomotive was partially restored to the widely spaced PRR 5-stripe scheme (first used in the 1930s and unique to #4800) in the 1980s. Displayed outdoors afterwards, it degraded and was treated with a preservative black coating until a full restoration can be completed. As of 2025, this project has not yet commenced.

== See also ==
- List of Historic Mechanical Engineering Landmarks
- List of North America Railway Hall of Fame inductees

== Sources ==
- Abendschein, Frederic H. (April 23, 1983). Grandia, Michael R.C. (ed.). "Pennsylvania Railroad Electric Locomotive GG1 4800". National Historic Mechanical Engineering Landmark. American Society of Mechanical Engineers.
- Bezilla, Michael (1980). Electric Traction on the Pennsylvania Railroad, 1895–1968. University Park: Penn State University Press. ISBN 978-0271002415. OCLC 5336721.
- Volkmer, William D. (1991). Pennsy Electric Years. Edison, New Jersey: Morning Sun Books, Inc. ISBN 978-1-878887-01-6.
