= Canada Southern Railway Station =

Railway station in Ontario, Canada

St. Thomas, ON
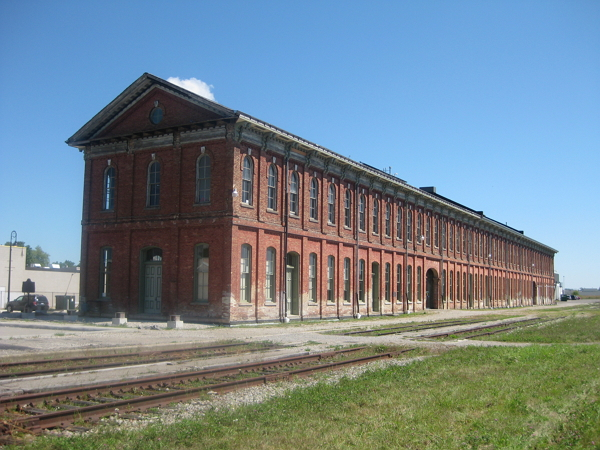
- Southwest corner of the station

General information
- Location: 750 Talbot Street; St. Thomas, Ontario; Canada
- Coordinates: 42.7779°N 81.1861°W
- Owner: North America Railway Hall of Fame

Construction
- Architect: Edgar Berryman (1839-1905)
- Architectural style: Italianate

Other information
- Website: casostation.ca

History
- Opened: 1873
- Closed: 1979

Former services
Preceding station	Amtrak	Following station
Windsor toward Detroit (Michigan Central)	Niagara Rainbow	Niagara Falls, New York 1978-1979 toward New York (Grand Central)
Windsor toward Detroit (Michigan Central)	Niagara Rainbow	Fort Erie Until 1978 toward New York (Grand Central)
Preceding station	New York Central Railroad	Following station
Shedden toward Chicago	Michigan Central Railroad Main Line	Kingsmill toward Buffalo
St. Clair Junction toward Courtright	St. Clair Branch	Terminus
Preceding station	Canadian Pacific Railway	Following station
Terminus	St. Thomas – Woodstock	O'Dell toward Woodstock

Heritage Railway Station (Canada)
- Designated: 1989

Ontario Heritage Act
- Official name: Canada Southern Railway Station, 750 Talbot Street
- Designated: 2014
Location

The Canada Southern Railway Station (CASO) is a former railway station in St. Thomas, Ontario, Canada. The station was built by the Canada Southern Railway (CSR) (Note: Both CASO and CSR have been used as abbreviations for the Canada Southern Railway. More recently, the station has been called CASO or the CASO station.) in 1873 as both a railway station and its corporate headquarters. It was one of the busiest stations in Canada during the 1920s. Train traffic ceased in the 1980s.

CASO became a protected heritage building in the late-1980s and was purchased by the North America Railway Hall of Fame (NARHF) in 2005.

== History ==
In the early-1870s, the CSR constructed a railway between Amherstburg and Fort Erie through St. Thomas. St. Thomas contributed $25,000 to construction and was selected as the location for CSR's headquarters; the town's population would quadruple in ten years because of the railway. CASO, CSR's St. Thomas station, was a large two-storey building designed by Canadian architect Edgar Berryman (1839-1905) to serve railway passengers and house CSR headquarters; it was built in 1871–1873. CASO was the largest of the 31 CSR stations built in southern Ontario during the 1870s.

In 1925, a fire that started on the second floor severely damaged the kitchen. For the next few years catering for the dining room was outsourced to the nearby Queens Hotel. The dining room was downgraded to a lunch room by or during the 1930s with the advent of dining cars.

Passenger service to CASO ended in 1979 under Conrail. In 1983, the CSR line was bought by a partnership between Canadian National (CN) and Canadian Pacific with freight service ending in the 1980s. CASO was designated a heritage building under the Heritage Railway Stations Protection Act in 1988, but the building deteriorated after CN abandoned it in 1996. The Ontario Heritage Trust added its own protection in 2002. The roof was replaced in 2004; funding was partially provided by the Ontario Trillium Foundation and Community Futures Ontario. NARHF bought the building in 2005. NARHF performed restoration work, and began renting out the building as commercial, office and event space to fund maintenance and restoration. The dining room hosted a wedding reception in October 2005 while restoration was in progress.

The building became protected under the Ontario Heritage Act in 2014.

The 115-metre (377 ft) south-side boardwalk was renovated in 2017. The existing 40,000 century-old bricks were reinstalled in the fall of 2016 with the help of a Federal Heritage Grant. The bricks stamped "SAGINAW" were made in Saginaw, Michigan.

== Facilities ==
=== Main building ===
CASO is a two-storey building in the Italianate style. This architectural style was atypical among major Canadian railway stations, which tended to be in the Romanesque, Beaux-Arts or Second Empire styles. The building is 108 metres (354 ft) long and 11 metres (36 ft) wide. The interior has high ceilings; 5.5 metres (18 ft) for the first and 5 metres (16 ft) for the second floors. There are 164 arched windows. The 400,000 white bricks used in construction were later painted red.

The first floor served as the railway station and the interior was well-appointed. Rooms spanned the full width of the building to conserve space and to allow direct access from the street to the boarding platforms. The outstanding feature was the formal dining room; it was served by uniformed waitresses who lived in bedrooms on the second floor. The dining room accepted orders from incoming travellers via telegraph. The dining room is now called Anderson Hall after the family that funded its restoration.

The second floor has a corridor spanning nearly the length of the building on the south side. The CNR's corporate offices were lavishly decorated.

The cellar had a tunnel leading to the railway tracks.

The station's original cost was estimated at between $10,000 - $12,000 in 1873.

=== Railway maintenance ===
Also located at the CASO Station were the Michigan Central Railroad car manufacturing shops. Also, it was here that master mechanic, Thomas William Cottrell helped establish the MCR shops as a regional repair shops for locomotives, rather than sending them to the United States for repair. (Cottrell was inducted into the North America Railway Hall of Fame in 2006 for his contribution to the railway industry in the category of "Local: Railway Worker & Builder.")

== Passenger train services ==
The station served New York Central long-distance trains in the 20th century.

- Empire State Express (Detroit–Buffalo–New York City)
- New England Wolverine (Chicago–Detroit–Buffalo–Boston) (westbound)
- New England Special (Chicago–Detroit–Buffalo–New York City) (eastbound)
- North Shore Limited (Chicago–Detroit–Buffalo–New York City) (westbound)
- Wolverine (Chicago–Detroit–Buffalo–New York City)

The station also served mixed trains heading due west to Courtright on the St. Clair River.

The last named trains through the station, the Empire State Express and the Wolverine were discontinued in 1967. The Penn Central continued unnamed Chicago–Buffalo trains through the station until the Penn Central ended its long-distance train operations on April 30, 1971. Amtrak continued the Niagara Rainbow on the Detroit–Buffalo–New York City from 1974 to 1979.

== Plaque ==
The on-site Ontario Heritage Trust plaque reads:

The St. Thomas Canada Southern (CASO) Station, financed by American railway promoters, was constructed between 1871 and 1873 to serve as both the passenger station for St. Thomas and CASO's corporate headquarters. During the 1920s, the station was one of the busiest in Canada. The Canada Southern rail route through southwestern Ontario ultimately linked Chicago and New York City, and was instrumental in the economic development and growth of St. Thomas. Designed in the Italianate style by Canadian architect Edgar Berryman (1839-1905), the impressive building is embellished with classical details such as pilasters, arched windows and passageways, wide eaves and a heavy cornice supported by paired brackets. The building's design, scale and quality of interior finishes make it unique within Canadian architectural history and it stands as a symbol of the importance of railway development in southern Ontario.

== Sources ==
- "Canadian Southern Railway Station: Self Guided" (PDF). North America Railway Hall of Fame. Archived from the original (PDF) on 2018-10-24.
- "St. Thomas Canada Southern Railway Station" (PDF). Ontario Heritage Trust. 2011–2012. Archived from the original (PDF) on 2013-09-21.
