= New York Central 1290 and 1291 =

Nos. 1290 and 1291
Type and origin
- Power type: steam
- Builder: Canada Southern Railway St. Thomas, Ontario, shops
- Build date: July and November 1900
Specifications
- Configuration
  - Whyte: 4-6-0
- Gauge: 4 ft 8 1/2 in (1,435 mm)
Career
- Operators: New York Central Railroad
- Class: Canada Southern F-82
- Last run: 1956 (No. 1291); April 27, 1957 (No. 1290)

The New York Central Railroad's #1290 and #1291 were a pair of Canadian F-82 4-6-0 "Ten-Wheelers". They were built in July and November 1900 by the Canada Southern Railway in the company's St. Thomas, Ontario, shops. Costing $18,537.82 each, they originally received the numbers 449 and 454. Four years later, the railroad was leased to the Michigan Central Railroad for 99 years, and the two locomotives were soon renumbered to 8152 and 8153. In 1929, the railroad was subleased to the New York Central, where it became its St. Clair Subdivision. During this time, the two steam engines were principally used on the St. Clair Subdivision, along with the Fort Erie and Niagara Falls branch lines. The locomotives were renumbered again in 1936, to 880 and 881. This lasted 12 years before they were renumbered a final time, to 1290 and 1291.

Despite the great purging of steam-powered engines on the Central in the 1950s, 1290 and 1291 were not immediately replaced. They ran on the Courtright branch line for the last part of their lives, as its track and bridges—running for 62 miles (100 km) between Courtright and St. Clair Junction, near St. Thomas—had deteriorated by the end of the 40s and could no longer handle newer (and heavier) motive power. By 1955, they were two of only 44 steam locomotives left running on the entire New York Central system. At some point in their later careers, water towers were removed from along the line; for all runs after, 1290 and 1291 ran with an auxiliary water tender behind the normal tender.

In 1955 and 1956, employees of Trains visited the line. On the latter trip, Jim Shaughnessy accompanied photographers Philip Hastings and John Krause and commented that the engines were virtually still in their 1900 form:

It was like entering a time warp to see old locomotives still in steam. Hardly anything had changed on the two 4-6-0's in their 56-year lifetime—no stoker or power reverse, just hand-fired, 73-ton machines with slide valves, 64-inch driving wheels, and 50 1/2-inch-tall smokestacks.

== Disposition ==
Both locomotives lasted well into the diesel age. 1291 ran until 1956, while 1290 ran until April 27, 1957. Having an estimated $4,928.57 in scrap value, 1290 was broken up in St. Thomas, while 1291 was taken to Buffalo, New York to be scrapped. The branch line lasted only three years beyond that.

The two locomotives were inducted into the North America Railway Hall of Fame in 2006.
