= Fort Erie station =

Railway station in Ontario, Canada

Fort Erie, ON

General information
- Location: Courtwright Street, Fort Erie, Ontario
- Coordinates: 42.92740°N 78.91938°W

History
- Closed: 1981
- Former names: Victoria; Bridgeburg (1873–1932)

Former services
| Preceding station | Amtrak | Following station |
|---|---|---|
| St. Thomas toward Detroit (Michigan Central) | Niagara Rainbow Until 1978 | Buffalo toward New York (Grand Central) |
| Preceding station | Canadian National Railway | Following station |
| Fort Erie West toward Stratford | Stratford – Fort Erie | Terminus |
| Preceding station | New York Central Railroad | Following station |
| Stevensville toward Welland | Fort Erie Branch | Black Rock toward Buffalo |
| Black Creek toward Niagara-on-the-Lake | Niagara Branch | Terminus |
| Preceding station | Wabash Railroad | Following station |
| Welland Junction toward Chicago | Chicago – Buffalo | Black Rock toward Buffalo |
Location

Fort Erie was a pair of adjacent Grand Trunk (partnered with the Canadian National Railway) and Michigan Central (succeeded by the New York Central) railroad stations in Fort Erie, Ontario. In earlier years, the Wabash Railroad served the Grand Trunk station as well via traffic rights.

The Canadian National Railway trains from the station consisted of a single six day a week mixed train between Fort Erie and Stratford, Ontario. This train was eliminated in the latter 1950s.

In mid-20th century, the New York Central's New England Wolverine, a Detroit–Boston counterpart to the Wolverine, and the Detroit–New York City Empire State Express, as well as unnamed Hamilton, Ontario–Welland, ON–Buffalo trains, and Detroit–Buffalo trains, made stops at the New York Central station.

Amtrak restored service through the station in 1974, until the rerouting of the Niagara Rainbow train service in 1978. The station has since been demolished.
