= Buffalo Central Terminal =

Former railroad station in Buffalo, NY. US

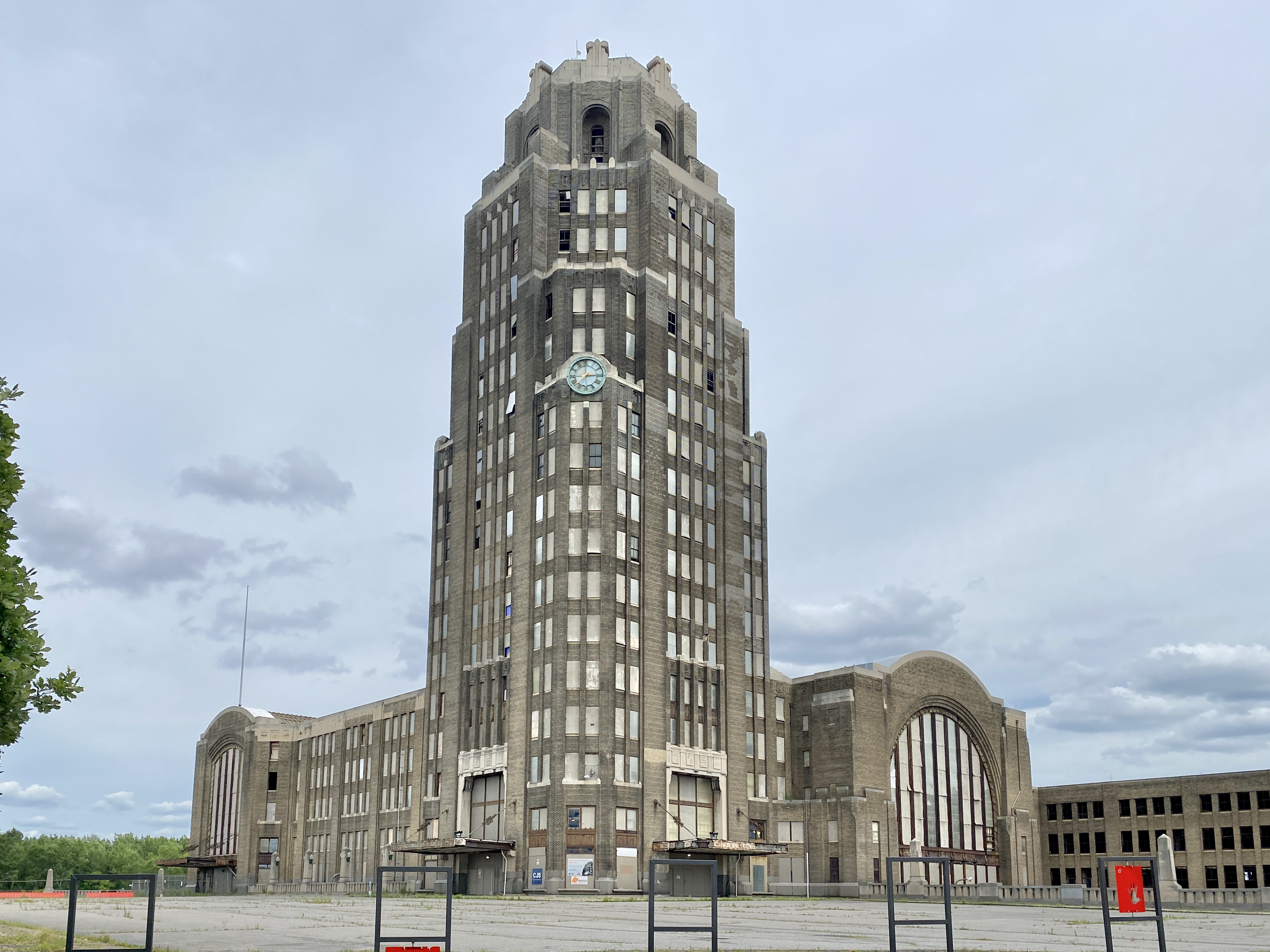

General information
- Location: 495 Paderewski Drive, Buffalo, New York
- Coordinates: 42°53′23″N 78°49′49″W
- Line: Empire Corridor (Buffalo Terminal Subdivision)
- Platforms: 14 island platforms
- Tracks: formerly 28

Other information
- Station code: BUF (former)

History
- Opened: June 22, 1929; 97 years ago
- Closed: October 28, 1979; 47 years ago

Former services
Preceding station	Amtrak	Following station
Erie toward Chicago	Lake Shore Limited 1975–1979	Rochester toward New York (Grand Central) or Boston South
Erie toward Chicago	Lake Shore 1971–1972	Rochester toward New York (Grand Central)
Buffalo–Exchange Street 1978–1979 toward Detroit (Michigan Central)	Niagara Rainbow	Rochester toward New York (Grand Central)
Fort Erie Until 1978 toward Detroit (Michigan Central)	Niagara Rainbow	Rochester toward New York (Grand Central)
Preceding station	New York Central Railroad	Following station
Bay View toward Chicago	Main Line	Depew toward New York
Buffalo–Exchange Street toward Chicago	Michigan Central Railroad Main Line	Terminus
Buffalo–Exchange Street toward Welland	Fort Erie Branch	Terminus
Preceding station	Pennsylvania Railroad	Following station
Terminus	Buffalo – Oil City	Blasdell toward Oil City
Terminus	Buffalo – Emporium	Ebenezer toward Emporium
- Buffalo Central Terminal
- U.S. National Register of Historic Places
- New York State Register of Historic Places
- Location within New York
- Location: Buffalo, New York
- Coordinates: 42°53′23″N 78°49′49″W
- Area: Buffalo Broadway/Fillmore district
- Built: 1929
- Architect: Fellheimer & Wagner
- Architectural style: Art Deco
- Website: buffalocentralterminal.org
- NRHP reference No.: 84002389
- NYSRHP No.: 02940.006721

Significant dates
- Added to NRHP: September 7, 1984
- Designated NYSRHP: August 3, 1984
Location

Buffalo Central Terminal is a historic former railroad station in Buffalo, New York. An active station from 1929 to 1979, the 17-story Art Deco style station was designed by architects Fellheimer & Wagner for the New York Central Railroad. Along with Buffalo City Hall (1931), it is regarded as one of the city's two most prominent Art Deco landmarks; both buildings employ setback massing and feature Indigenous American decorative motifs. The Central Terminal is located in the city of Buffalo's Broadway-Fillmore district. Closed since 1979, several attempts to redevelop the site were unsuccessful. In February 2024 a new development team was formed to plan a reuse for the terminal.

== Layout ==
The terminal is located about 2.5 miles (4.0 km) east of downtown Buffalo, and consists of several structures, some of which are connected, while others were formerly interconnected. The station was originally intended to accommodate 400 daily train trips, though the terminal never reached ridership projections when it opened.

=== Buildings ===
The main terminal building is owned by the Central Terminal Restoration Corporation. The main terminal building includes the passenger concourse and office tower. The passenger concourse is 225 feet (69 m) long, 66 feet (20 m) wide, and 58.5 feet (17.8 m) tall (63.5 feet [19.4 m] at the domed ends). The passenger concourse included various rental spaces; a restaurant with a dining room, lunch room, and coffee shop; a Western Union telegraph office; and a soda fountain, along with standard station necessities. Off the Passenger Concourse there is a streetcar lobby and waiting room. Curtiss Street runs directly below the passenger concourse, but has been closed since the late 1980s for safety reasons. The office tower is 15 stories, excluding the main floor and mezzanine and is 271-foot (83 m)-high.

The Mail & Baggage Building on Curtiss Street is owned by the Central Terminal Restoration Corporation. It is a five-story building immediately adjacent to the main concourse. The mail building along Curtiss Street is owned by the City of Buffalo. It is a two-story building adjacent to the Baggage Building.

The Railway Express Agency was the early forerunner of today's FedEx and UPS. The building is located behind the Mail Building of the complex and is by far the most decayed building. Trains would pull directly into the building to proceed with the load/unloading of goods. This building is currently owned by the City of Buffalo.

The train concourse is 450 feet (140 m) long and includes 14 low-level platforms. Each platform is accessed by a staircase and a ramp. The train concourse is owned by Amtrak, with the land being owned by CSX. In 1982, the bridge which connected the train concourse and passenger platforms from the terminal and main concourse was demolished to allow passage of high freight cars on the Belt Line. The rest of the concourse remains.

=== Former buildings ===
Other buildings included a Pullman Company service building, an ice house and a coach shop, all of which were demolished in 1966 to lower property taxes.

The first building built as part of the project was a cogeneration power station that provided heat and electricity to the complex, even during construction. It contained three 28-foot (8.5 m) coal boilers. The building's smokestack was dismantled in 1966 to save on taxes. The power plant itself lasted up until the mid-1980s, with its exact demise not known.

== History ==
=== Planning and construction (1925–1929) ===
During the late 19th century, Buffalo had several railroad stations, and there were calls for a single union station. The first attempt to direct rail traffic out of downtown Buffalo came in 1874, when a Union Depot (East Buffalo) opened there. The new station proved unpopular, and thus Exchange Street station remained open. In 1889, a new Union Station was proposed to be built on the site of the future Central Terminal, but it never happened. From about 1905, East Buffalo also served the West Shore Railroad, its service was consolidated from a station on Wick Street. East Buffalo station closed between 1921 and 1923.

The New York Central Railroad (NYC) had two stations in Buffalo in the early 20th century: the Exchange Street Station and the Terrace Station. Both of these downtown stations were old—Exchange Street dated to before the American Civil War—and were plagued with downtown congestion.

NYC decided to build the new Buffalo Central Terminal 2.5 miles (4.0 km) to the east, in order to relieve both rail and grade crossing congestion and to be more conveniently located for trains not terminating in Buffalo. A roomier area would also ease the transfer of sleeping cars between trains. Furthermore, Buffalo was a quickly-growing city at the time, and it was believed that before long Central Terminal's area would become closer to the center of a sprawling metropolis of 1.5 million people. The city was not so sure, but planning was well underway in 1924, despite the lack of an agreement at the time.

NYC finalized its decision to build the terminal in 1925, and site preparation began the following year. NYC President Patrick Crowley hired Alfred Fellheimer and Steward Wagner to build the actual station in 1927. The cost of the project was $14 million. Prior to the building of the station, the site was bounded to the south by the New York Central main line, to the northwest by the NYC's West Shore Railroad, and to the east by the NYC's Junction Railroad. When the station was built, the West Shore was abandoned between the NYC main line and the Junction Railroad, being rerouted via the other two lines and the new station. The former West Shore right-of-way is now Memorial Drive.

A celebration attended by 2,200 invited guests on June 22, 1929, opened the station. Speakers included Henry Thornton and Frank X. Schwab. Although an eastbound Empire State Express departed the station at 14:10, the train was not a regular one, and was really just ceremonial. The station did not open until the celebration ended at 15:30, and scheduled service began on June 23.

=== Opening ===
In the early days, the station was served not only by the owner, but also by the Canadian National, Pennsylvania Railroad and the Toronto, Hamilton & Buffalo Railway.

When the NYC operated the 20th Century Limited, Central Termimal was located approximately 44 miles (71 km) east of the half-way point from New York City to Chicago, and the trains would pass each other near there. The NYC's 1930 calendar featured these trains meeting at the then-new Terminal with artist Walter L. Greene's Eastward, Westward night time scene.

The station had 1,500 employees and was designed to handle 3,200 passengers per hour.

For most of Central Terminal's history, far too few trains stopped there to justify the use of such a large facility. Although 200 trains called there at the station's opening, the Great Depression began less than a year after its construction, and the rise in automobile use also hurt passenger levels.

=== Wartime and decline (1941–1979) ===
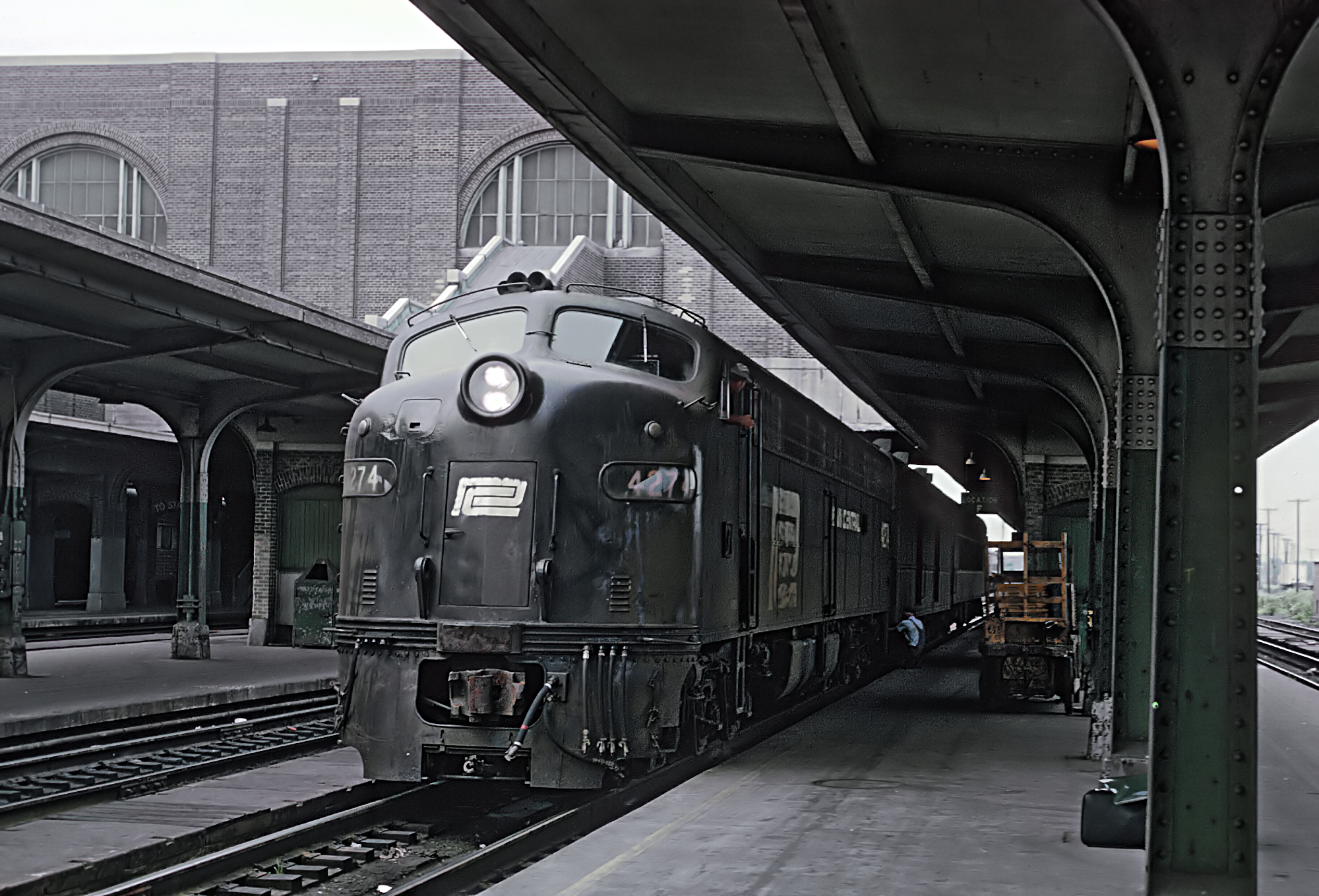
A Penn Central locomotive at Buffalo Central Terminal on July 20, 1969

There was a burst of activity during World War II when the station had a reasonable amount of train traffic for its size. Notable trains making daily calls at the station include the Wolverine, Interstate Express, the Ohio State Limited, the Lake Shore Limited, the 20th Century Limited (engine crew-change stop only), the New England States, the Boston Express, the Empire State Express and Southwestern Limited, among many others.

After the war, the station entered into what would be a permanent decline, amid the larger decline in train travel across the country. As early as 1956, the New York Central offered the terminal for sale for one million dollars. A company called Buffprop Enterprises negotiated a 25-year lease of the terminal in 1959, but that ended the following year. The service to Niagara Falls, New York ended by 1961.

In 1966, the continuing decrease in passenger revenues caused NYC to demolish parts of the Terminal complex, including the Pullman service building, coach shop and ice house. In 1968, the NYC merged with the PRR to form Penn Central (PC), which operated the terminal until the formation of Amtrak in 1971.

The bankrupt PC was absorbed by Conrail in April 1976. In 1978, Amtrak restored direct service to Niagara Falls. One train per day connected with Via Rail/Toronto, Hamilton & Buffalo Railway service to Toronto–forerunner of today's Maple Leaf. The financially-strapped passenger carrier was in no position to rehabilitate Central Terminal, resulting in the reopening of Buffalo-Exchange Street station near downtown for the Empire Service route, including the connecting service to Toronto, further marginalizing use of Central Terminal. That left Central Terminal with only two services; the Lake Shore Limited to Chicago and the Niagara Rainbow to Detroit. The four daily trains did not even begin to justify the massive sums necessary to rehabilitate such a large station; Amtrak had to spend $150,000 per year on heating bills alone. Amtrak replaced it in 1979 with the much-smaller Buffalo–Depew station, 10 miles (16 km) east of downtown. The last train to call at Central Terminal was the westbound Lake Shore Limited, which departed at 04:10 on October 28, 1979.

=== Ownership by Anthony Fedele (1979–1986) ===
The building was sold to Anthony Fedele, a local builder, for $75,000 in 1979. Fedele planned a 150-room hotel, offices and restaurants for the terminal complex that would have been called Central Terminal Plaza but could not find investors for the project. Fedele also lived in the building creating an apartment for himself in the tower on the second floor. While the building was under the control of Fedele it was reasonably taken care of.

It was during this time that the railroad tenant left. Conrail closed its offices in 1980. The Conrail Dispatching Department was the last business to leave the Terminal in 1984. Two interlocking towers, numbered 48 and 49, that serviced the tracks on the property were closed in 1985.

In November 1983, in a sign of things to come, the building was in danger of being sold out from under Anthony Fedele by the Internal Revenue Service for back taxes. Fedele made an attempt at settling the debt by paying $10,200 toward the $142,128 due, and agreed to pay $2,000 a month until the debt was paid in full. During the time he owned the building, it was placed on the National Register of Historic Places (NRHP) in 1984.

=== Telesco and Tuchman ownerships (1986–1997) ===
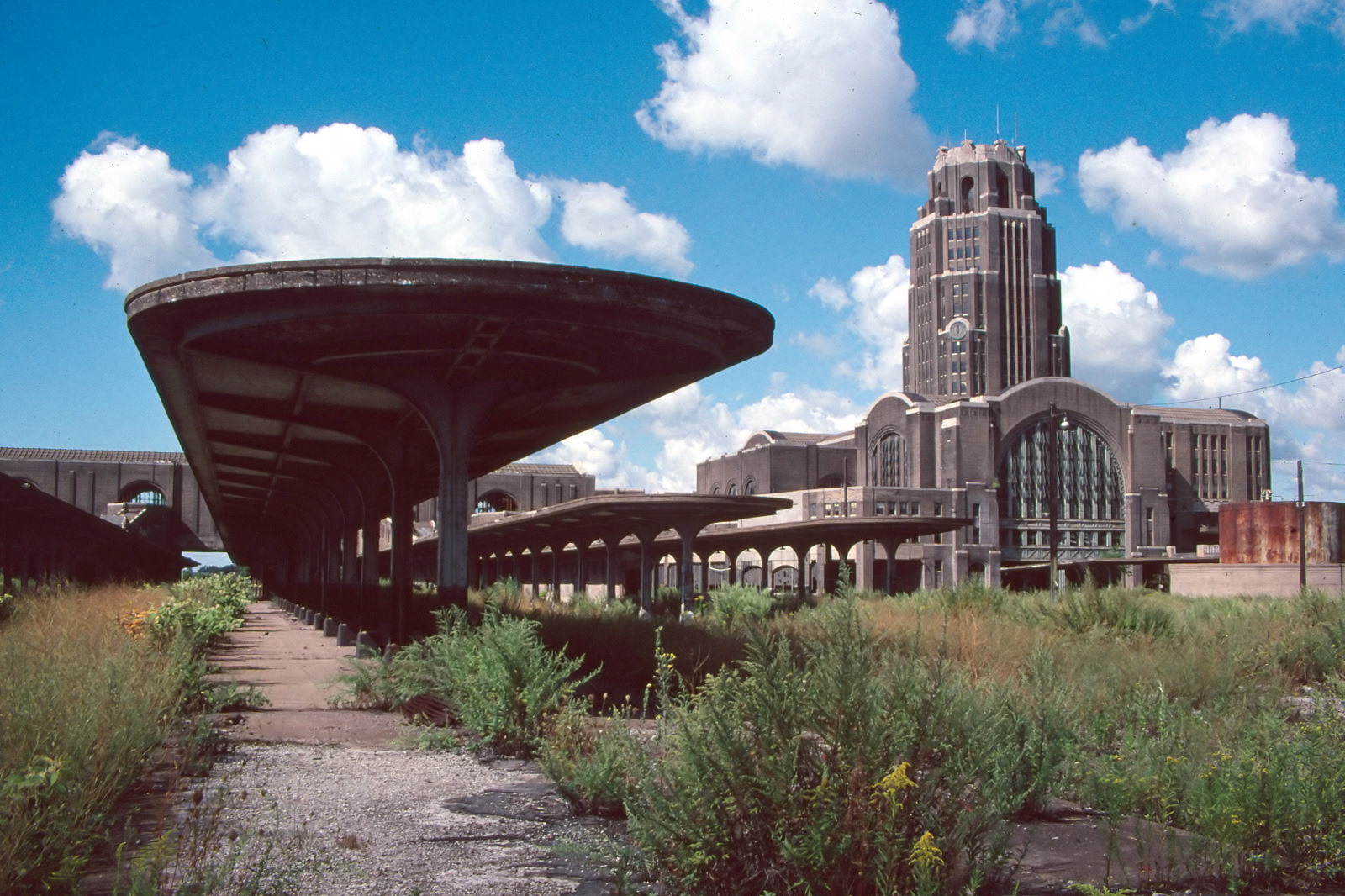
Abandoned platforms in 1989

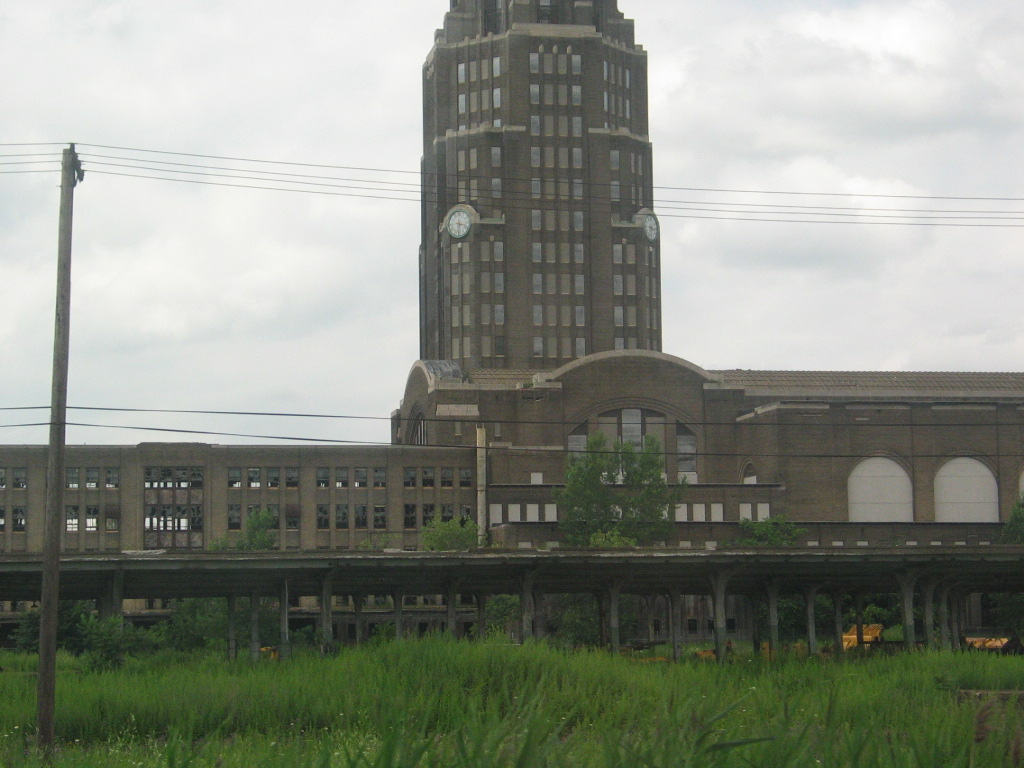
Concourse and terminal building in 2004

When the terminal was added to the NRHP, it was a "...virtually intact representative example of the Art Deco style in Buffalo..." However, in 1986 Anthony Fedele defaulted on his taxes and U.S. Bankruptcy Court Judge John W. Creahan ordered a foreclosure sale. The Buffalo Central Terminal was put up for auction and won by Thomas Telesco, the only bidder, for $100,000. Telesco talked about turning it into a banquet hall and using it as a station on a proposed high-speed rail line linking New York and Toronto. He later began the process of selling the architectural artifacts and other items of value from the building.

The building was then acquired by Bernie Tuchman and his uncle, Samuel Tuchman. This period was one of great decay for the Terminal caused by human vandals and the elements. The Terminal's main buildings were subject to extensive artifact removal. Once a truck was being used to remove ceiling lights when it backed into the famous plaster bison statue in the concourse, smashing it. Artifacts removed and sold included iron railings, signs, lights and mailboxes. Thieves pulled copper from the roofs which allowed water to penetrate the walls. A basement water main break was left unchecked and freeze/thaw cycles caused ice to pull at the foundation. Further, as the building was not secured, there were even some arson attempts. It is said that the only thing that saved the building was that demolition would have been too expensive ($12 million). A 1990 proposal by Adrian Development Inc. to convert the complex to a shipping, warehouse, and light manufacturing hub never advanced beyond the drawing board stage. In 1993 a construction company used the concourse for equipment storage and erected security fences but extensive damage had already been done.

=== Central Terminal Restoration Corp. (1997–present) ===
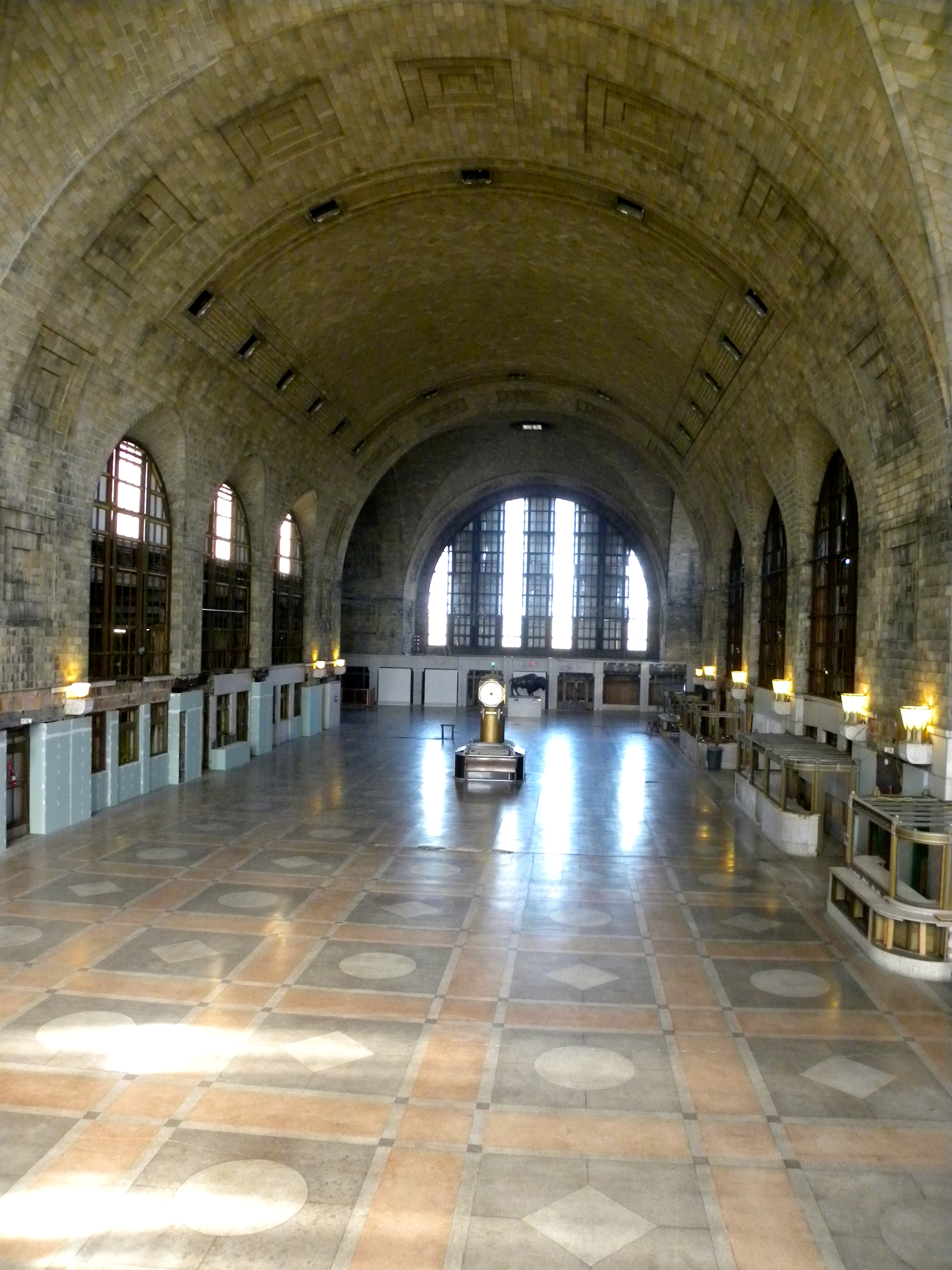
The concourse in 2013

Scott Field of the Preservation Coalition of Erie County bought the building in August 1997 for the purchase price of $1 and assumption of approximately $70,000 in back taxes. Shortly afterward, the Central Terminal Restoration Corporation (CTRC), a non-profit dedicated to restoring the Central Terminal, was formed. The CTRC currently owns the Main Terminal Building and the Mail & Baggage Building. The CTRC received money to restore and relight the exterior tower clocks located on the tenth floor, relighting them on October 1, 1999. Also in 1999, a state grant for $1 million was obtained to begin the process of sealing and protecting the complex. The top of the building was re-lit starting on May 11, 2001.

The abandoned building was occasionally used for events. In 2003, the building was re-opened for public tours. The clock in the center of the concourse, sold by earlier owners, was located in Chicago in 2003. In late 2004, the clock was purchased for $25,000 through fundraising organized by WBEN and a donation from M&T Bank. The clock was on display in the Terminal during the 2005 event season. In the fall of 2005, it was relocated to the lobby of M&T Center in downtown Buffalo, where it remained until spring of 2009. The clock was then moved back to its original location in the terminal concourse where it will sit permanently on public display.

In 2004 the terminal hosted a temporary art installation by controversial artist Spencer Tunick.

In 2016, Toronto-based developer Harry Stinson was named by the CTRC as the designated developer for Buffalo's Central Terminal to re-develop the Terminal complex. Stinson's proposal included turning the Terminal into a mixed use facility and also included building townhouses in the surrounding neighborhood to create a village like atmosphere with proceeds being invested into terminal restoration. The proposal also offered the possibility of restoring rail service to the terminal.

On May 5, 2017, after numerous delays, the CTRC cut ties with Stinson in favor of working with the Urban Land Institute on a new redevelopment plan. In October 2017 the World Monuments Fund selected Central Terminal as part of its 2018 World Monument Watch List: one of two selections from the United States and one of 25 selections total. In 2018, two hundred solar panels were installed at the terminal, restoring commercial-grade electricity to the facility.

In 2019, the State of New York launched the East Side Avenues initiative to spur economic development on Buffalo's East Side to repair decades of urban renewal policies that led to poverty and decline. This influx of support enabled the organization to hire staff and develop the 2021 Master Plan, a vision for the future of the building. Meanwhile, the CTRC became part of the East Side Avenues, an initiative born out of the Buffalo Billion catalytic investment.

For many years the Buffalo Central Terminal hosted several major fundraising events each year to generate interest in reuse of the building, including tours, art shows, local political events, train shows, annual Dyngus Day and Oktoberfest, and weddings. Since 2020 the Buffalo Central Terminal has shifted to host events outdoors on the Great Lawn, including a public art extravaganza entitled PLAY/ground, Eid al-Fitr—an outdoor prayer event celebrating the end of Ramadan, a filming by a local theater digital production, a pop up COVID-19 vaccination clinic, the Beau Fleuve Music & Arts Celebration, and annual Trunk or Treat and Seat at the Table, among others.

In 2020 construction on the First Phase of the Passenger Concourse began, consisting of replacement of the former restaurant roof to make the space clean and dry; this was completed in 2021. In 2021, the Master Plan was completed after an extensive community engagement effort, and the Central Terminal, Broadway Market, and Broadway-Fillmore neighborhood were awarded a $10 million Downtown Revitalization Initiative (DRI) grant.

In 2022, A Request for Expression of Interest was released to solicit development partners for the reuse of the Buffalo Central Terminal. The CTRC was awarded $61 million through the Regional Revitalization Partnership to spur business in Buffalo's East Side, and $1.5 million through the Broadway-Fillmore Downtown Revitalization Initiative to support enhancements to the Great Lawn. The CTRC also received a Community Placemaking Grant from the Project for Public Spaces to transform the Terminal's Great Lawn into a public green space.

An extensive structural stabilization project remains underway and is anticipated to continue into 2027. The interior spaces of the Terminal were closed to the public while critical structural repairs were underway and all events were held outdoors. It was anticipated that the interior will be reopened to the public, at least on a limited basis, in 2025. The Regional Revitalization Partnership provided $33 million for the stabilization of the main building in November 2024, allowing the second phase of the renovation to begin. By mid-2025, the main concourse was planned to reopen in mid-2027.

== Future ==
=== Adaptive reuse plans ===
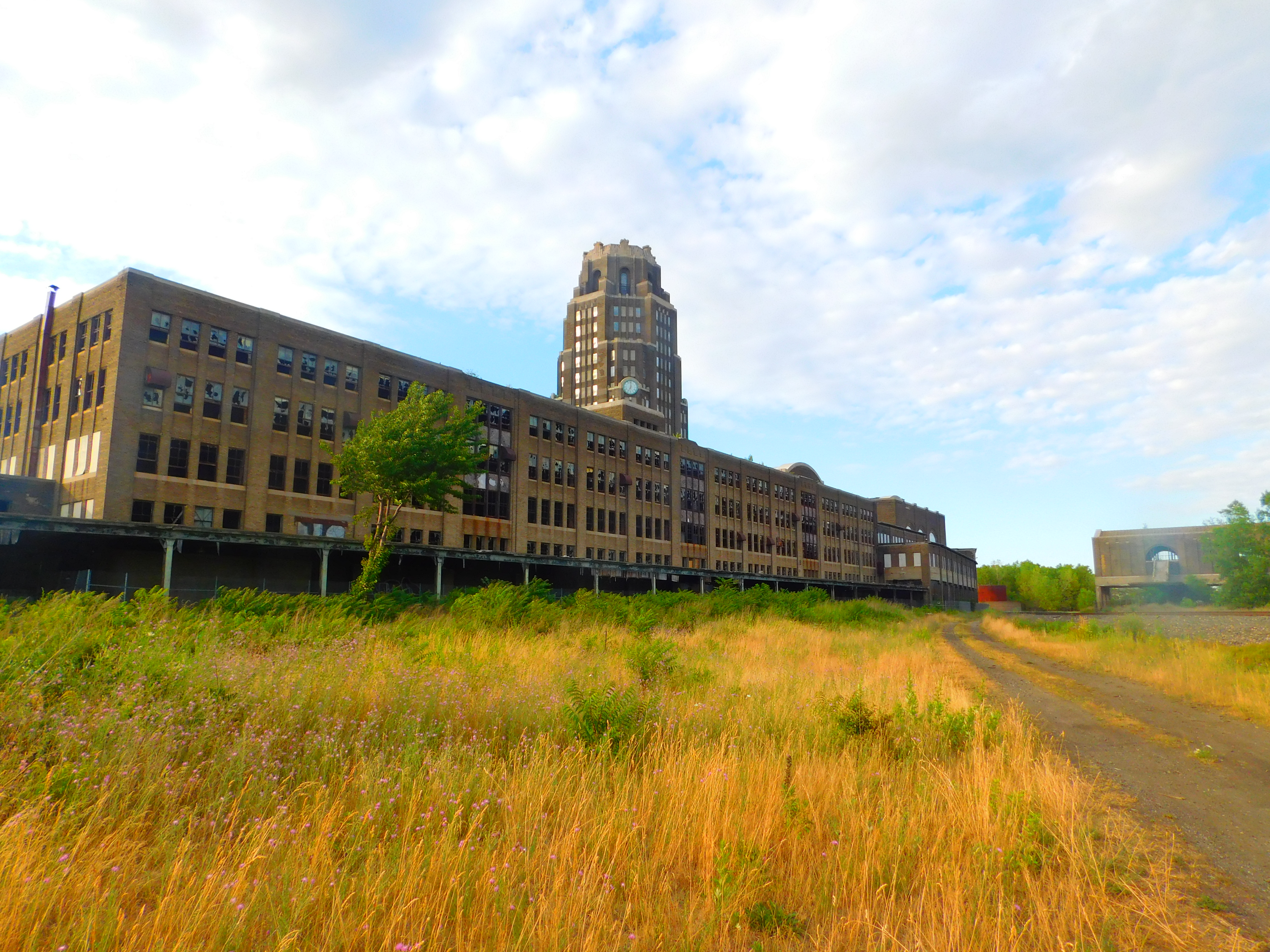
The former headhouses of Buffalo Central Terminal in July 2016

In 2009 the CTRC developed a vision plan for the future of the Terminal. In May 2017, the CTRC, City of Buffalo and New York State decided to have the Urban Land Institute study the terminal as this group had led the successful reuse of Buffalo's Richardson Olmsted Complex. The group's comprehensive study of the Terminal complex was fast-tracked, with a projected completion by June 30, 2017. The panel concluded that a strategy had to include a development plan for the East Side and a master plan for the building. Suggestions for use included having the concourse reopen to the public with a restored restaurant as a year-round venue, as well as beautifying the green space and creating a park. No suggestions were made for the tower or baggage buildings.

Based on these recommendations, on April 13, 2018, Governor Andrew Cuomo announced $5 million in funding for a restoration of the concourse, along with the creation of a year-round event space in the concourse and waiting-room areas, and parking accessibility, along with full capacity for catering and entertainment.

=== 2021 Master Plan ===
The CTRC completed a Buffalo Central Terminal Master Plan in the summer of 2021. The Master Plan was a year-long, collaborative planning process that included three public meetings with more than 325 participants, 200 online planning activities and 3,000 website visits, 60 focus group leaders in six sessions, and 25 Community Advisory Council members participating in six meetings. The Master Plan prescribes a phased plan for redevelopment of the Terminal and identifies key activation opportunities to leverage unique spaces that support local and regional enterprises, tourism and cultural exchange. Early phases focus on creating a year-round event venue that would bring people back to the main concourse and the grounds. Later phases focus on the expansion of programs and activation of other parts of the building. The Master Plan does not completely rely on the return of rail service to the historic station, however it does accommodate future rail service should it be returned.

On June 1, 2022, Governor Kathy Hochul announced that the Buffalo Central Terminal would receive $60 million to kick-start the reuse and implement the 2021 Master Plan. This amount was part of $300 million in funding provided through the Regional Revitalization Partnership, a collaboration among the Empire State Development (ESD), the philanthropic sector, and local government with the goal of building community wealth and economic development in Buffalo, Niagara Falls, and Rochester.

In February 2024 a new development team, composed of two real estate brokerage companies and an investment firm, was formed to plan a reuse for the terminal.

=== Future of Amtrak in Buffalo ===
In September 2016 the roof of the downtown Exchange Street Amtrak station collapsed. This led to calls for a new train station in Buffalo and a discussion of moving the stop back to Central Terminal. Congressman Brian Higgins called for a study for a new train station to be done at both Central Terminal and a site at Canalside saying about the terminal "It may not have been possible 15 years ago, but restoration of Central Terminal is possible in the new Buffalo. ... In the enormous scale of that redevelopment project, it may be possible to carve out a small 'station-within-a-station' that would squarely and singularly focus on providing a highly-functional train station to meet current and projected needs. This (the Central Terminal) location would allow the restoration of service to Chicago within the city limits, and it certainly merits a meaningful engineering review." Higgins' call was later reinforced by Senator Charles Schumer.

On October 5, 2016, Congressman Higgins along with Buffalo Common Council Member David Franczyk toured the terminal with Mark A. Lewandowski, president of the CTRC. Higgins came out in support of the station at the terminal as part of a larger redevelopment plan. A public campaign to bring Amtrak back to the Central Terminal was launched, complete with a website and social media.

A plan to return Amtrak to Central Terminal could possibly later add a long discussed NFTA Metro Rail extension from Downtown to the Buffalo Niagara International Airport which would include stops at Central Terminal as well as the Walden Galleria. This would connect Central Terminal to the airport as well as to the heart of downtown. On April 17, 2017 a 17-member panel including Buffalo mayor Byron Brown approved, by a margin of 10–4, a downtown replacement close to the existing Exchange Street station over the Terminal, in a decision seen as controversial. The station site and Central Terminal became part of a political debate, with candidates running in the 2017 Buffalo mayoral election against Brown promising a reversal of this decision if elected. Eventually, Amtrak built a temporary structure at Exchange Street until a new building on the same site opened in November 2020.

== Timeline ==
- 1925: NYC finalizes its decision to build a new terminal east of downtown Buffalo to relieve rail and grade crossing congestion.
- 1926: Site preparation begins; track is laid and Lindbergh (now Memorial) Drive is created.
- 1927: Alfred Fellheimer and Steward Wagner are hired to design the station; construction begins on the 17-story office tower.
- 1928: Steel work proceeds throughout the year; the last rivet is laid in December.
- June 22, 1929: Grand opening of the Terminal, attended by 2,200 invited guests. The first train departs at 2:00 p.m.
- 1940s: Passenger traffic increases significantly during World War II.
- 1956: Owing to declining ridership, the NYC puts the Terminal up for sale for $1 million; no buyer is found.
- 1961: The ICC allows the New York Central Railroad to discontinue service between Buffalo and Niagara Falls.
- 1966: The Pullman Service Building, Coach Shop, Ice House and Power House are demolished to reduce property taxes.
- 1968: The New York Central Railroad and the Pennsylvania Railroad merge to form Penn Central, the new owners of the Terminal.
- 1970: Penn Central goes bankrupt.
- 1971: Amtrak is created and uses the Terminal as its central Buffalo station.
- 1976: Penn Central and several other railroads merge into Conrail, the new owner of the Terminal.
- October 28, 1979: Amtrak abandons the Terminal for the newer Dick Road station in Depew. Anthony T. Fedele purchases the complex for $75,000.
- 1982: Train concourse bridge is demolished so taller freight cars can pass through on the Belt Line.
- 1984: The Terminal is placed on the State and National Registers of Historic Places on August 3.
- 1986: Fedele defaults on taxes and U.S. Bankruptcy Court orders a foreclosure sale. Thomas Telesco acquires the Terminal for $100,000 as the only bidder.
- 1986–1997: The Terminal endures a period of neglect under successive owners Telesco and Tuchman. Architectural artifacts are removed and sold, vandals damage the interior, and water infiltration causes severe deterioration of the concourse. Several arson attempts also occur.
- 1990: Complex sold to Bernie Tuchman.
- 1993: The concourse is leased for heavy equipment storage; security fences are erected but extensive damage has already occurred.
- 1997: Scott Field of the Preservation Coalition of Erie County purchases the Terminal for $1 and approximately $70,000 in back taxes. The Central Terminal Restoration Corporation (CTRC) is formed shortly afterward.
- 1999: A $1 million state grant is obtained to begin sealing and protecting the complex. The exterior tower clocks are restored and relit on October 1.
- 2003: Removal of 350 tons of debris, asbestos abatement, roof work and window repairs are completed. The Terminal is reopened for public tours.
- November 2003: The BCT is placed on the Preservation League of New York State's "Seven to Save" list.
- 2004: The BCT celebrates its 75th anniversary. The city provides $75,000 for rehabilitation.
- 2005: The original concourse clock, located in Chicago, is purchased for $25,000 through fundraising organized by WBEN and a donation from M&T Bank.
- 2006: The Terminal draws 20,000 visitors, a record, driven by Oktoberfest, the Buffalo Brewfest and the Train Show.
- 2007: CTRC celebrates its tenth anniversary as the Dyngus Day celebration returns to the Terminal.
- 2008: Abatement in the restaurant area and concrete work by the entrance are completed.
- 2009: The Terminal celebrates its 80th anniversary and the Main Concourse Clock is returned to its original location.
- 2011: A master plan outlining reuse of the complex is released. CTRC is awarded a $306,000 grant from the New York State Office of Parks, Recreation and Historic Preservation for entryway canopy restoration. A replica bison statue is placed in the Main Concourse and the Urban Habitat Project is launched.
- 2012: Toronto antique dealer Robert Navarro donates an original light fixture back to the Terminal, also returning the $3,000 raised by the CTRC to purchase the artifact.
- 2013: CTRC begins phase 1 of the roof replacement over the passenger waiting room. Replacement concourse light fixtures are fabricated from the donated original by Sheet Metal Workers Union 71.
- 2017: $250,000 in electrical upgrades are secured. The Urban Land Institute conducts a comprehensive study of the Terminal and surrounding neighborhood.
- 2018: $5 million from the State of New York Empire State Development is secured for concourse restoration. 200 solar panels restore commercial-grade electricity.
- 2019: The CTRC becomes a part of the East Side Avenues, an initiative born out of the Buffalo Billion catalytic investment.
- 2020: Construction on the First Phase of the Passenger Concourse begins, starting with replacement of the former restaurant roof.
- 2021: The Master Plan is completed after an extensive community engagement effort. The Central Terminal, Broadway Market, and Broadway-Fillmore neighborhood are awarded a $10 million Downtown Revitalization Initiative (DRI) grant.
- 2022: The CTRC is awarded $61 million through the Regional Revitalization Partnership. The Terminal also receives $1.5 million through the Broadway-Fillmore DRI for Great Lawn enhancements and a Community Placemaking Grant from the Project for Public Spaces.

== Statuary ==
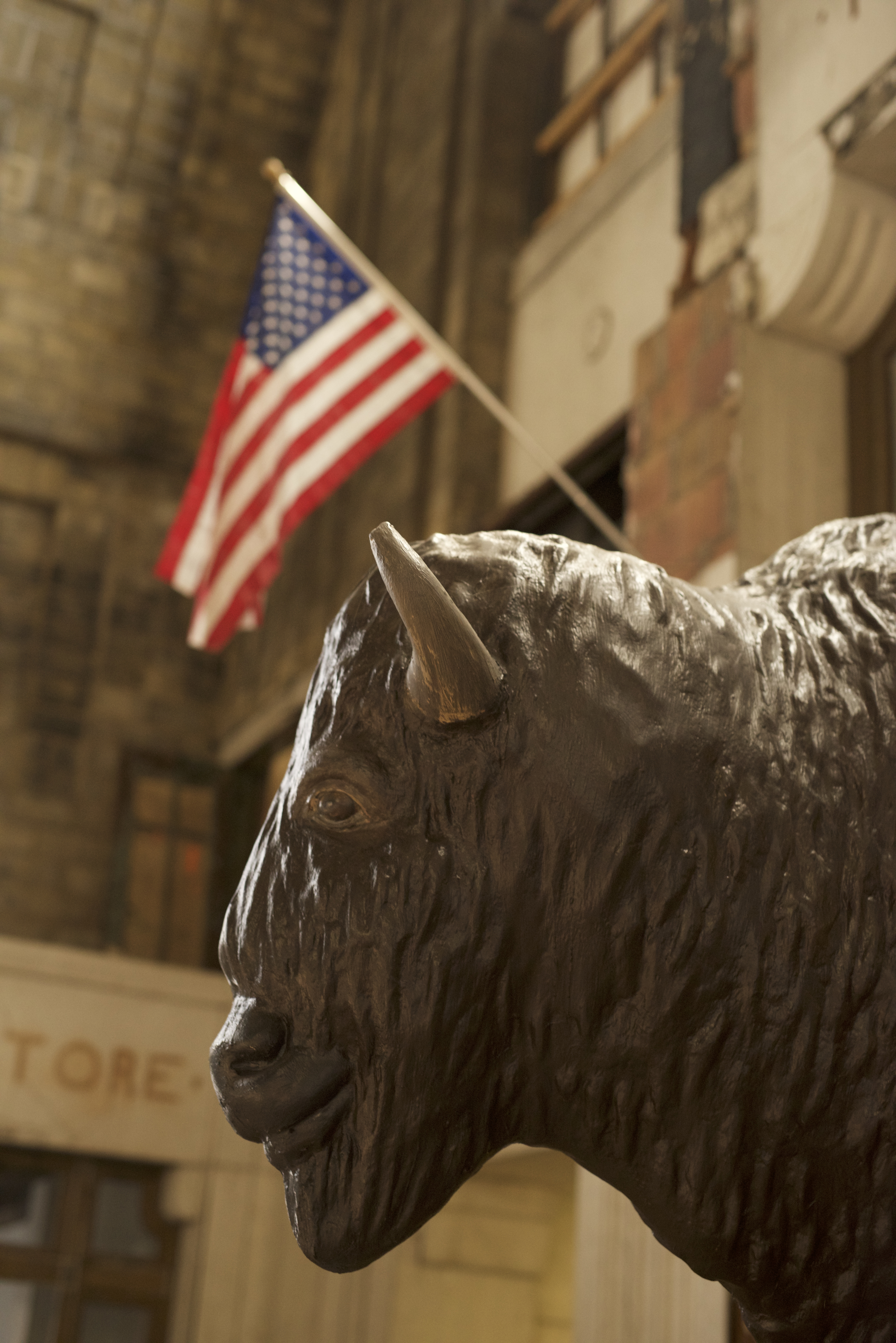
The replacement Buffalo statue

Several notable statues have graced the station's space over the years. The station once had a stuffed American bison in the concourse, belonging to the Buffalo Museum of Science and used to advertise the museum. Passengers (including soldiers bound for World War II) rubbing their hands on the bison caused it to become worn, so it was removed to the Buffalo Museum of Science and replaced with a plaster cast, bronze painted statue. This statue was accidentally destroyed by an owner during abandonment. A bronze recasting from the original molds can be found outside Alumni Arena at the University at Buffalo North Campus. On October 17, 2011 the buffalo in the terminal was replaced by the Central Terminal Restoration Corporation with one made out of fiberglass donated by Mollenberg-Betz, Inc., a Western New York-based mechanical contractor and Niagara Coatings Services, which specializes in various industrial coatings.

After the station was closed, the statue called "Progress" was placed on the terminal plaza by Anthony Fedele, who was the owner of the building after it closed. The statue was intended to signify the rebirth of the Central Terminal. Some people within the CTRC had thought to move the statue to the Griffis Sculpture Park in East Otto, New York but that was an impossibility due to its horrible condition. Since it was in incredible disrepair—tilting, falling apart, of no historical significance and an eyesore—Bob Rushok, a leader of the building's restoration, had a City of Buffalo payloader demolish it during a community cleanup event in the early 2000s and haul it away.

== In popular culture ==
The train platforms appear in the 1982 film Best Friends. The train arrival scene was shot in 1981, two years after Amtrak service ended, but before the connection to the terminal building was severed.

A photo of the abandoned train platforms was used for the cover art of Canadian artist Robbie Robertson's 1987 debut solo album.

Central Terminal stood in for Chicago Union Station in The Natural. Filming took place in 1983 while Conrail still occupied part of the building.

In November, 2005, a local film company shot its first feature film, Prison of the Psychotic Damned, in the Terminal. The low-budget film details what happens when a group of dysfunctional ghost-hunters decide to spend a night in the long rumored to be haunted structure. A benefit screening of the film was held at the Terminal on June 23, 2006.

The paranormal investigators, The Atlantic Paranormal Society (TAPS), visited the terminal for about a week in June, 2008 and aired their findings on Ghost Hunters (Episode 417 – "Speaking With the Dead"), September 24, 2008. Footage taken during this investigation shows that, aside from the main concourse, the entire complex is still currently in a state of heavy disrepair. The spin-off show Ghost Hunters Academy visited the terminal for the episode broadcast December 2, 2009. On October 31, 2010 (Halloween), Ghost Hunters aired a live 6-hour broadcast from the station.

The Central Concourse and other Buffalo landmarks appear in Marshall, the 2017 biographical film of US Supreme Court Justice Thurgood Marshall. Parts of the interior were cosmetically restored as part of filming for the movie.

In 2018, the Terminal was used as the filming location for the music video promoting hip-hop producer DJ Premier's track "Headlines", which features Buffalo-based rap group Griselda Records, consisting of rappers Westside Gunn, Conway the Machine, and Benny the Butcher. The video included shots of the musicians in various locations within the Terminal grounds, as well as other shots of areas within Buffalo's East Side neighborhood.

Scenes for the 2020 film Clover were shot around the Terminal and the grain elevators.

== Gallery ==
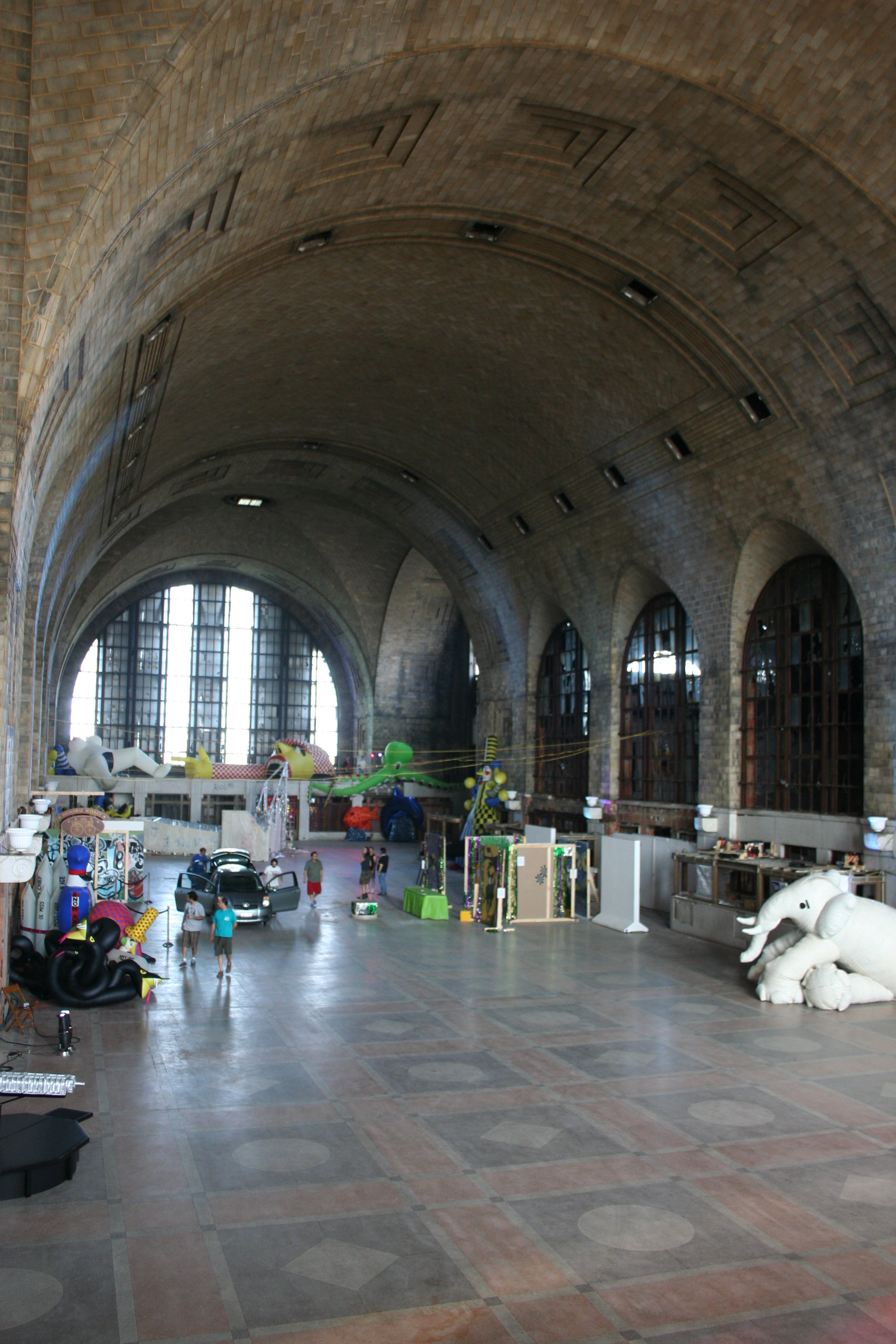
The main concourse

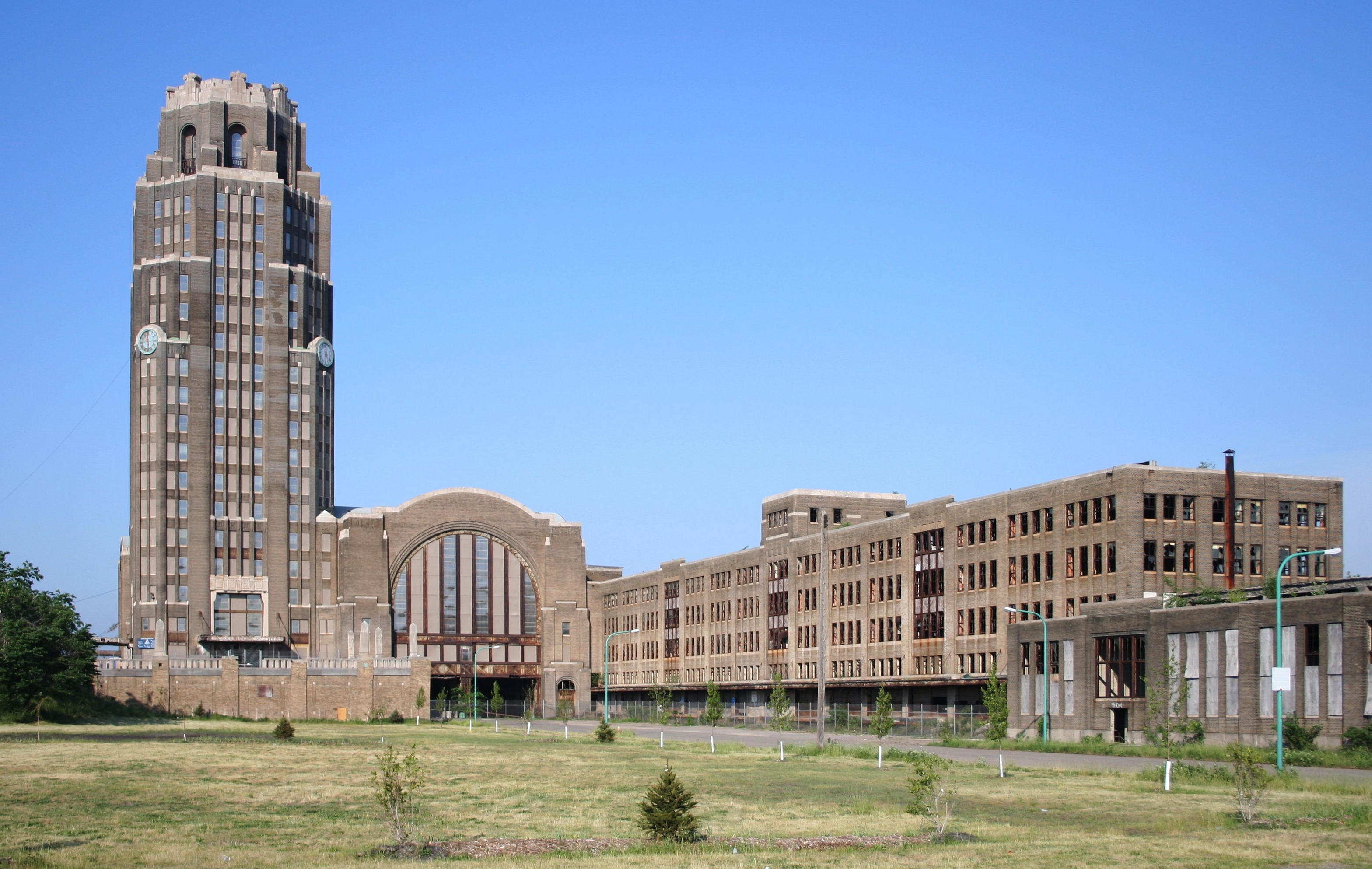
Buffalo Central Terminal

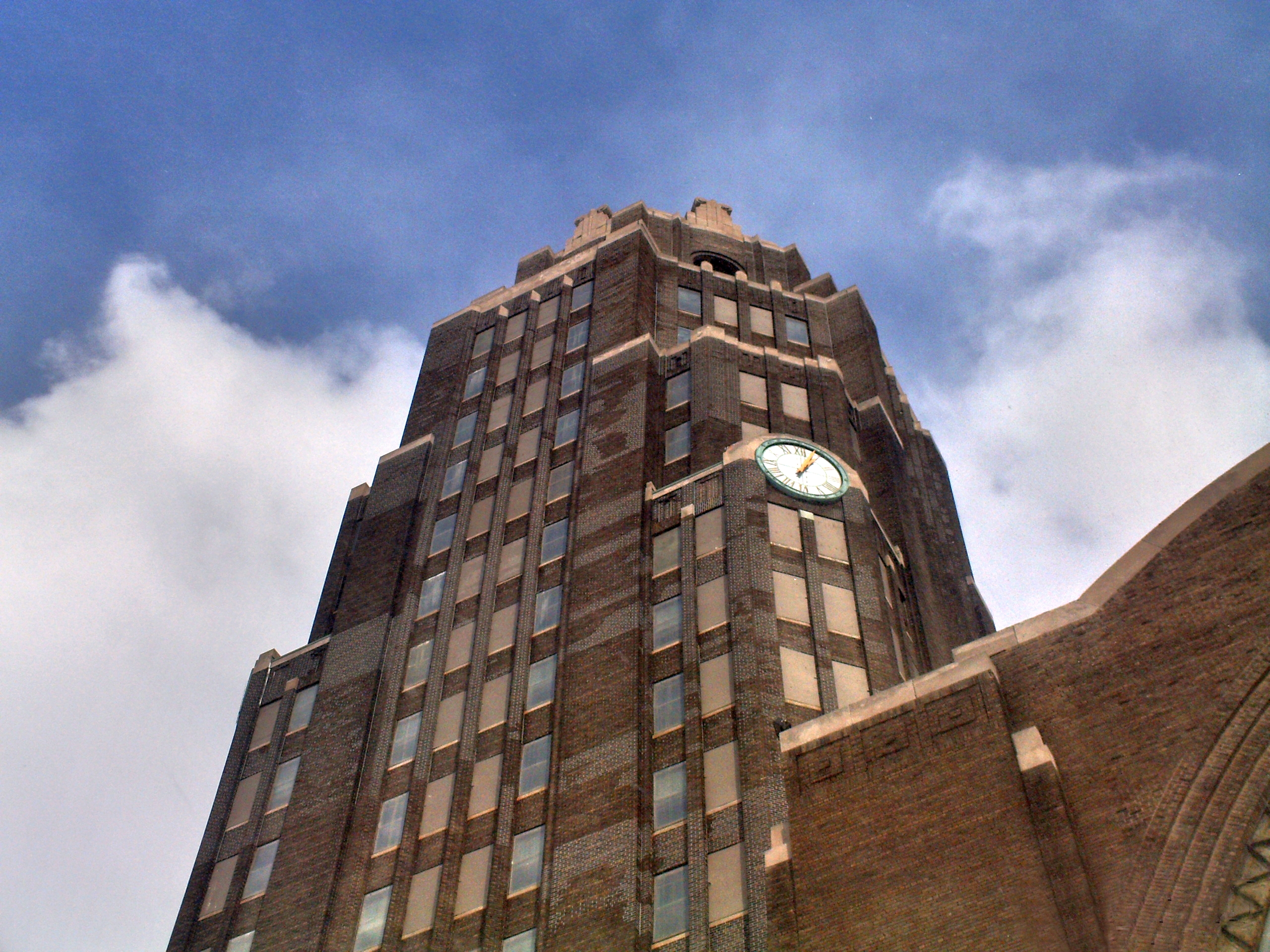
One of four corner clocks on the office tower

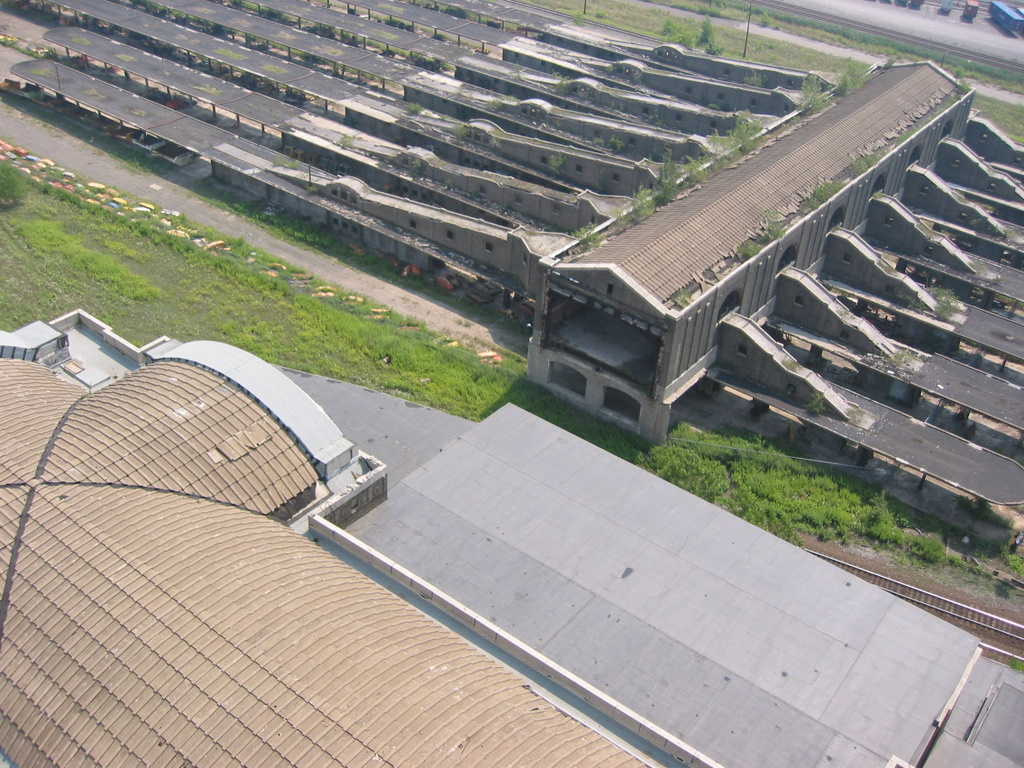
Seven platform train concourse accessed by stairs or a ramp. It is now detached from the main building.

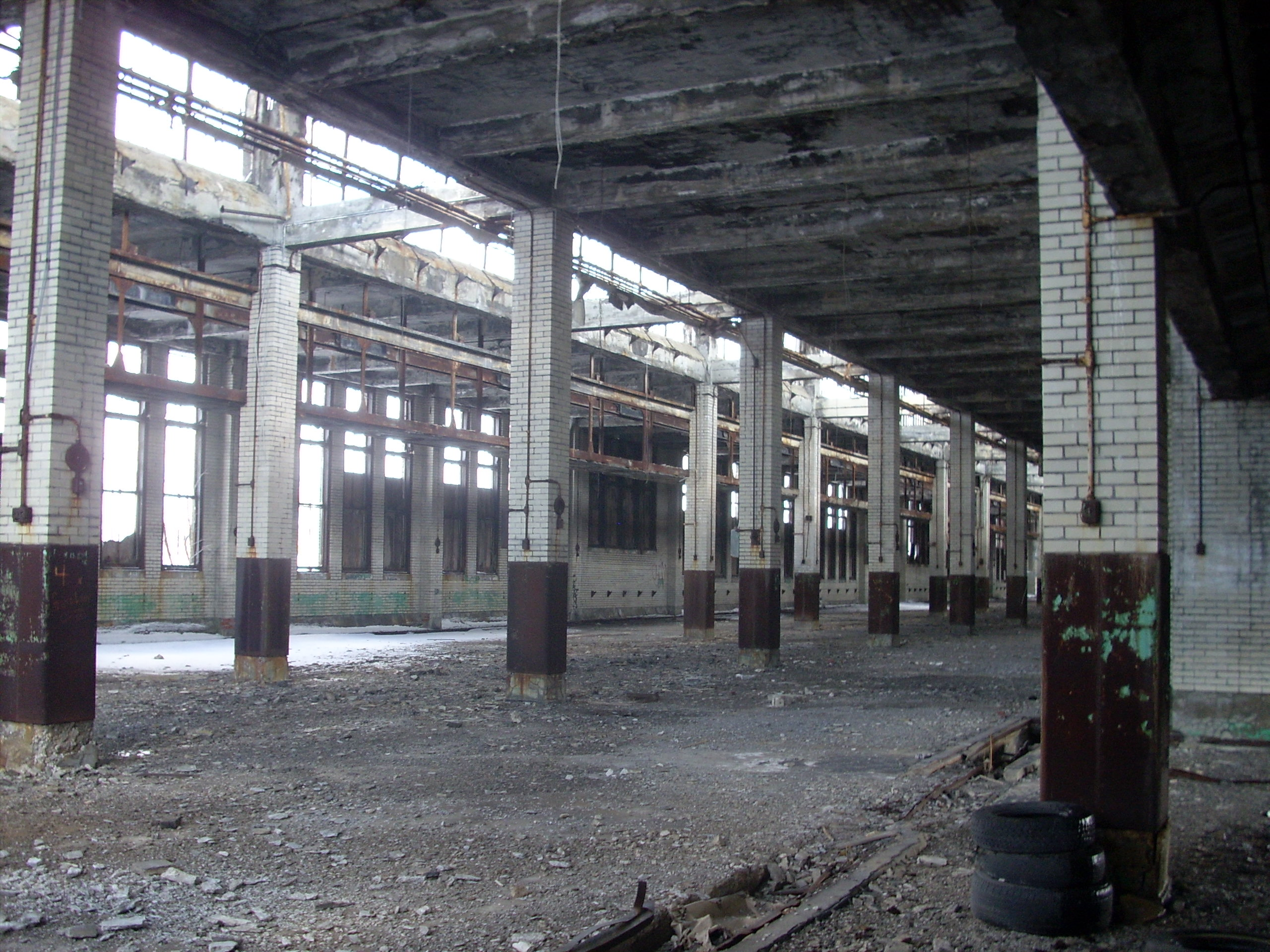
Interior of the Mail Building on the Central Terminal grounds.

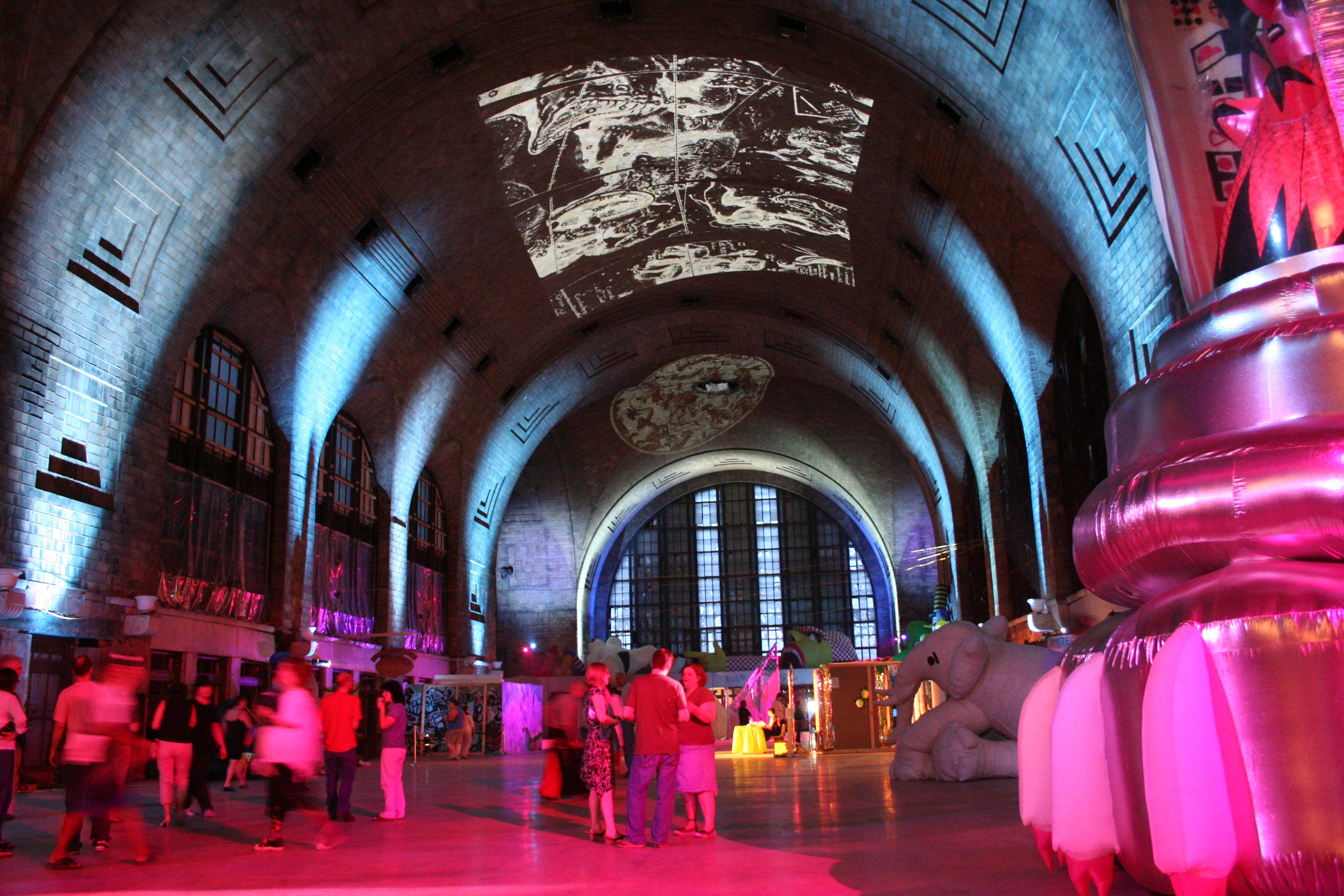
Artists and Models fundraiser event in the main concourse, 2007

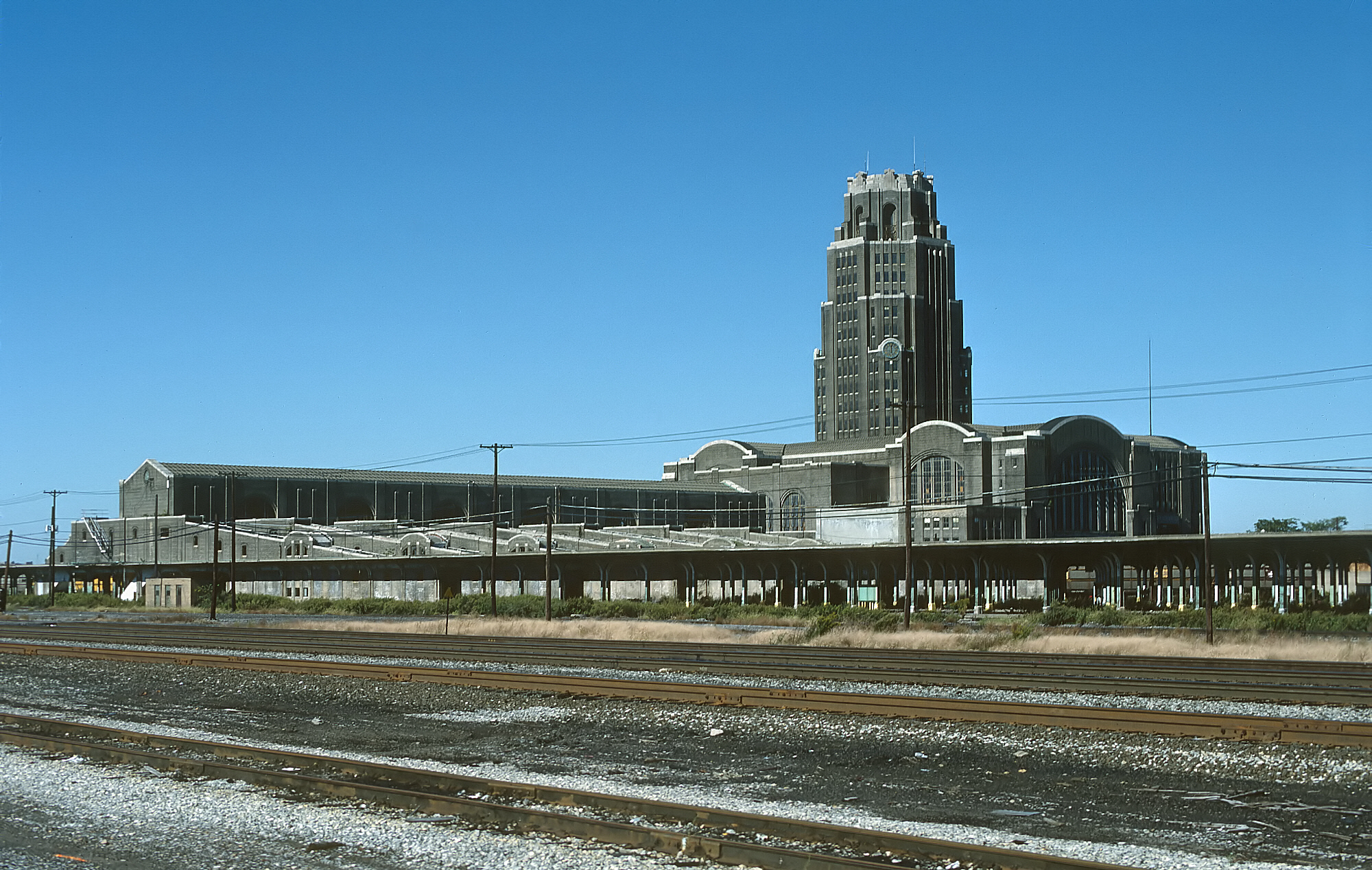
NYC Central Terminal in October 1987

== See also ==
- List of tallest buildings in Buffalo, New York
- Tower City Center – Formerly the Cleveland Union Terminal, a similar train station-turned-entertainment center
- Buffalo–Exchange Street station
