= Canada Southern Railway =

Defunct railway in Ontario, Canada

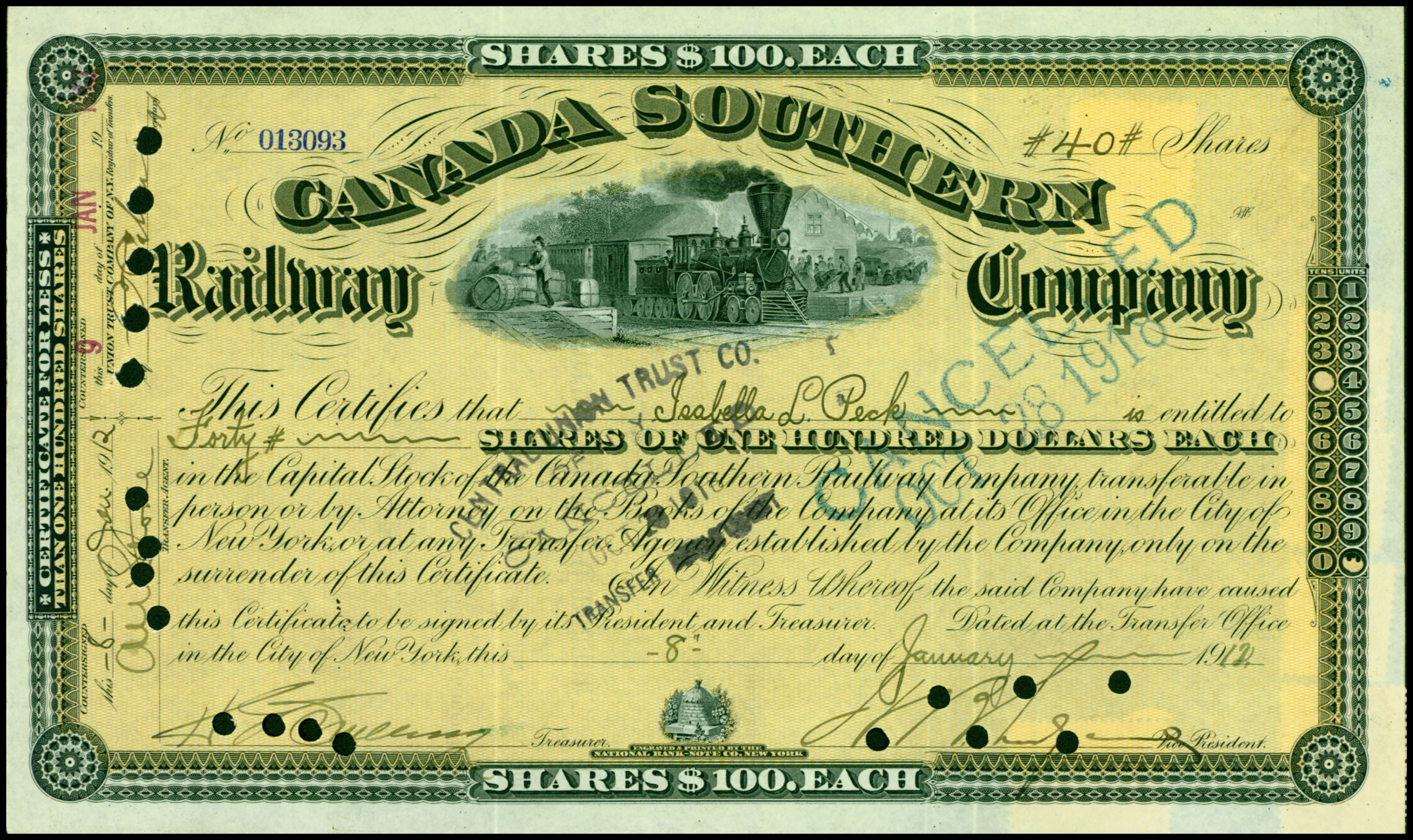
- Share of the Canada Southern Railway Company, issued 8 January 1912.

Overview
- Stations operated: St. Thomas
- Parent company: Michigan Central Railroad (1883-1985): New York Central Railroad (sublessor; 1929-1968); Penn Central (sublessor; 1968-1976); Conrail (sublessor; 1976-1985)
- Headquarters: St. Thomas, Ontario
- Reporting mark: CASO
- Locale: Southern Ontario
- Dates of operation: 1868–1985
- Successor: Canadian National Railway / Canadian Pacific Railway

Technical
- Track gauge: 1,435 mm (4 ft 8 1/2 in) standard gauge

The Canada Southern Railway (reporting mark CASO), also known as CSR, was a railway in southwestern Ontario, Canada, founded on February 28, 1868 as the Erie and Niagara Extension Railway. Its name was changed to Canada Southern Railway on December 24, 1869. The 1868 Act specified that it was to be constructed at a broad gauge of 5 ft 6 in (1,676 mm), but that requirement was repealed in the 1869 Act, thus allowing construction at the standard gauge of 4 ft 8 1/2 in (1,435 mm).

The railway was leased to the Michigan Central Railroad (MCR) for 99 years in 1883; in 1929 it was subleased to the New York Central Railroad (NYC). Its successors Penn Central (formed 1968) and Conrail (formed 1976) later exercised control before being sold to Canadian National Railway/Canadian Pacific Railway in 1985.

== History ==
=== Background ===
The line was originally conceived by Kenyon Cox (brother of Jacob Dolson Cox, Governor of Ohio), Daniel Drew, Sidney Dillon and John F. Tracy to connect with the Wabash Railroad and establish a railway network extending from Lake Erie to the Mississippi River.

The Panic of 1873 was responsible for the failure of several large railroads in North America, together with their financial backers. In addition to the CSR, the Missouri, Kansas & Texas Railroad, Northern Pacific Railroad, Chesapeake and Ohio Railroad and New York and Oswego Midland Railroad were also affected.

The CSR's banker, Kenyon, Cox & Co. (of which Drew was general partner) failed, and its bonds were subsequently protested, although some observers felt that the move was unnecessary. CSR subsequently became insolvent, as it was unable to redeem the bonds. Within two years, it was taken over by the railroad magnate Cornelius Vanderbilt at essentially no cost other than taking on the guarantee of them.

When Cornelius died in 1877, his son, William Henry Vanderbilt, became head of the Vanderbilt railroad empire. The younger Vanderbilt took steps to separate the various railroad properties he controlled. On 1 January 1883, the New York Central Railroad (NYC) was able to lease the CSR to another Vanderbilt railroad company, the Michigan Central Railroad (MCR), on a 21-year renewable term. Vanderbilt, who owned all three companies, ensured that each one operated independently, through its own autonomous president and board of directors. In 1929, MCR subleased CSR to NYC, its parent company.

=== Development of the line ===
System map, c. 1917.

The company was originally authorized to construct a railway line between Fort Erie and Sandwich (Windsor), with a branch line to Amherstburg. A second branch line was authorized in 1869 between St. Thomas and Sombra the following year. Other significant subsequent legislation included:

Act	Significant provisions
The Canada Southern Railway Act, 1872, S.O. 1871-2, c. 48	further branch lines authorized to Sarnia and Chatham (s. 1)
The Canada Southern Railway Act, 1873, S.O. 1873, c. 86	further branch lines authorized to Petrolia and Oil Springs, and connecting lines to either the Niagara River or the Erie and Niagara Railway (s. 2)
The Canada Southern Railway Act, 1874, S.O. 1874 (1st Sess.), c. 41	authorization to construct and operate telegraph lines (s. 2)
An Act respecting the Canada Southern Railway Company, S.C. 1874, c. 68	CSR declared to be a work for the general advantage of Canada; migration to federal incorporation
An Act to authorize the Canada Southern Railway Company to acquire the Erie and Niagara Railway Company, and for other purposes, S.C. 1875, c. 66	authorizing union or amalgamation with the Erie and Niagara Railway
The Canada Southern Arrangement Act, 1878, S.C. 1878, c. 27	authorizing a scheme of arrangement, (Note: a group of American bondholders disputed the scheme's application to them, which was dismissed by the Supreme Court of the United States in 1883) under which: new bonds would be issued by the Company (secured by a mortgage on its assets and revenues), in order to redeem other bonds previously issued by the Company, together with the purchase of mortgage bonds issued by related companies; interest on the new bonds would be guaranteed for a twenty-year term by the New York Central and Hudson River Railroad Company
An Act to confirm a certain Agreement made between the Grand Trunk Railway of Canada, the Canada Southern Railway Company, and the London and Port Stanley Railway Company, S.O. 1888, c. 67	authorization of usage rights on a line leased by the Grand Trunk Railway from the London and Port Stanley Railway, in order for the CSR to be able to offer connecting service between St. Thomas and London
An Act to confirm a certain Agreement made between the London and South Eastern Railway and the Canada Southern Railway Company, S.O. 1888, c. 69	coordinating legislation to enable the CSR to use terminal facilities constructed by the London and South Eastern Railway, and to connect with the LSER's line

There was an attempt in 1883 to amalgamate the CSR with the Credit Valley Railway, which was dropped when the CVR opted to merge with the Ontario and Quebec Railway instead.

=== Corporate headquarters ===
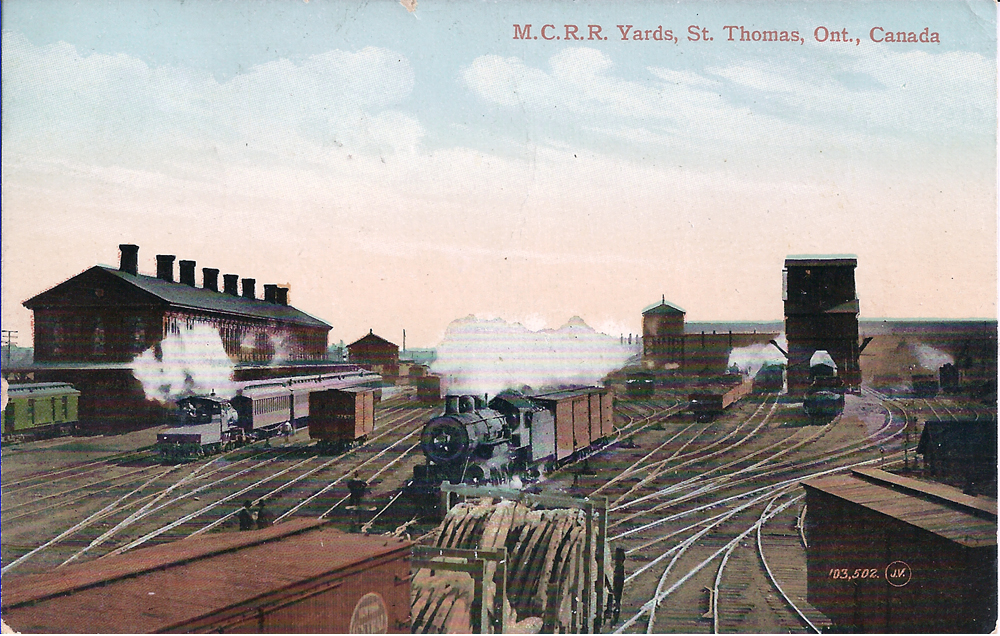
Postcard showing the St. Thomas Railway Station and the yard as it existed behind the station, circa 1915.

CSR's headquarters were located in St. Thomas, Ontario. The site was chosen because St Thomas was roughly equal-distance between Windsor and Fort Erie, Ontario and the city offered a $25,000 bonus to the railroad company as an incentive to build within city limits. CSR's main building, the Canada Southern Railway Station, included a passenger station and dining room on the ground floor with the railway's head offices on the upper floor. The extremely long, narrow building was based on Italianate architecture and is the only known train station in Canada to embody this style. The station was the design of Canadian architect Edgar Berryman (1839-1905).

=== Car shops and locomotive manufacturing ===
A large car shop, located in the yard, facilitated the manufacture of cars and allowed repairs to be made to locomotives. Steam locomotives were also manufactured for CSR in the car shop, beginning in 1882 and closed sometime after 1905. Types of locomotives made included:

- B-82b Class - Type 0-6-0
- B-82d Class - Type 0-6-0
- B-84 Class - Type 0-6-0
- B-84b Class - Type 0-6-0
- F-81c Class - Type 4-6-0
- F-82f Class - Type 4-6-0
- F-82 Class - Type 4-6-0
- F-82a Class - Type 4-6-0
- G-80e Class - Type 2-8-0

Initially all locomotives were built for use by CASO, but some ended their career with the New York Central Railroad.

=== Later years ===
The CSR was never completely controlled by the New York Central (later part of Penn Central) or the Michigan Central, as the two together held only about 107,000 of the 150,000 shares outstanding, and the rest were publicly held. The shareholders had received dividends in every year from 1887, and an extraordinary dividend in 1976 triggered a legal dispute that was not resolved until 1983.

On April 30, 1985, the Canadian National Railway and Canadian Pacific Railway jointly purchased the former CASO from Conrail in order to acquire the Michigan Central Railway Tunnel under the Detroit River and the Michigan Central Railway Bridge at Niagara Falls.

Much of the CASO has been downgraded, abandoned or removed by CN and CP over the years. Operations through Niagara Falls (and over the MCRR bridge) were discontinued with that portion of the line through the city removed in 2001. Unlike the rest of the line, however, the Detroit River tunnel is a key part of freight movements across the Canada-US border and still sees a good number of mainline trains.

The CASO rarely operated its own rolling stock after acquisition, and its reporting mark was abolished in 1977.

== See also ==
- New York Central 1290 and 1291
- Canada Southern Railway Station
- List of Ontario railways
- List of defunct Canadian railways
