= North America Railway Hall of Fame =

North American Railway Hall of Fame
- Established: 1996
- Location: 750 Talbot Street, St. Thomas, Ontario, Canada
- Coordinates: 42°46′41″N 81°11′10″W
- Type: Transport museum
- Director: Larry Longfield
- President: Matt Janes
- Website: narhf.org

North America Railway Hall of Fame (NARHF) is a not-for-profit organization housed in the restored Canada Southern Railway Station in St. Thomas, Ontario, Canada. It was founded to maintain, preserve and honor railway history with the induction into the Hall of Fame of people, events, structures, railway art forms, rolling stock, technical innovations, railway workers and trains, and inventions in the railway history. Incorporated in 1996 its goal is to educate the public about the impact of railway transportation in the categories of "North America," as well as "National", specific to Canada and "Local" (St. Thomas.)

== Mission statement ==
The mission statement of the North America Railway Hall of Fame is to:

- To recognize and establish an enduring tribute to men and women of the past who have made significant contributions or achievements relating to the railway industry in North America
- To likewise honor significant railway organizations, railway related innovations and technical accomplishments, railway rolling stock, railway buildings and other construction feats, railway cultural contributions and historical railway events.
- To provide a facility for the preservation and display of a collection of library materials and railway heritage artifacts related to the Hall of Fame inductees
- To educate the public about the impact of railway transportation on the history and the continuing development of communities, nations and international relations throughout North America.

After the acquisition in 2005 of NARHF's permanent home (the Canada Southern Station) further goals were added to mission statement.

- To preserve and restore the truly historic and significant Canadian Southern Railway Station in St. Thomas, Ontario
- To establish a tourist attraction to support economic development, and to provide a facility that will meet the needs of the community.

== History ==
The North American Railway Hall of Fame was incorporated in 1996. There were ceremonies in 1999 and 2001 before the Hall of Fame bought their current home, the Canada Southern Railway Station at 750 Talbot Street, St. Thomas, Ontario, Canada.

Since the acquisition of the Station as a home for NARFH, there have been induction ceremonies in 2006, 2008, 2010 and 2012 with additional inductions every two years. Originally, the first induction ceremonies of 1999 and 2001 took place at the St. Thomas Public Library.

After the purchase of the Canada Southern Station, the destinies of the Hall of Fame and the former railway station became intertwined. Fundraising projects were needed for both housing artifacts and creating and exhibiting the displays recognizing the Hall of Fame inductees, but also for the restoration and maintenance of the historic building which houses NARHF.

== Canada Southern Station ==
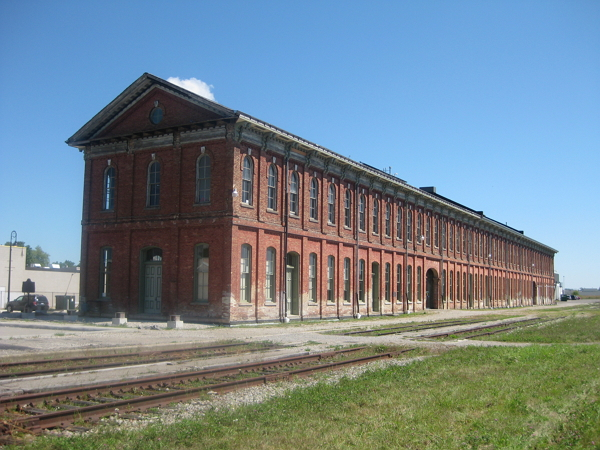
Canada Southern Railway Station, St. Thomas Ontario

In 2004, the North America Railway Hall of Fame purchased its permanent home, the Canada Southern Railway Station (CASO Station) from a non-profit railway group called ONTRACK.

In 2005, ownership of the building was turned over to NARFH.

The CASO Station, once near ruin, is almost completely restored. While the station was finished in 1873, the historical restoration point is approximately from 1914 to the early 1920s. It was a significant stop for New York Central Railroad passenger trains mid-way on their Ontario route from Buffalo to Detroit. Tours are self-guided or provided depending on availability of staff. Visitors explore the history and unique design of the CASO Station as well as an array of station related period objects on display. The second floor houses the displays and exhibits for the North America Railway Hall of Fame.

Revenue is provided to The Hall of Fame through the renting of 2nd floor offices as well as Anderson Hall (the main dining hall) and the Ladies Waiting Room for meetings, weddings, receptions and more. The Canada Southern Railway Station not only provides a home for the North American Railway Hall of Fame, it was inducted into the Hall of Fame in 2001 in the "Facilities & Structures" category in the "Local" group.

The CASO Station also enjoys the status as an Ontario Heritage Trust Building.

== Induction process ==
=== Hall of fame categories ===
The induction process begins with a nomination. Anybody can make a nomination to the Hall of Fame by either contacting the Hall of Fame at the Canada Southern Railway Station or using the online nomination form at Hall of Fame website. The categories include:

- Communities, businesses, government and organizations
- Facilities and structures
- Railway art forms and events
- Railway workers and builders
- Rolling stock
- Technical innovations

The nominees judged as to whether they are significant on a local, national, or North American level. Of course, all nominees need to have somehow made a significant and appropriate contribution to the world of the trains and rail transport.

=== Selection process ===
The induction process is open to the general public and the public may make nominations to NARFH at the Canada Southern Railway Station at 750 Talbot Street in St. Thomas, Ontario or online at the Hall of Fame Website

Once the nominations are closed, a panel composed of experts make the final selections.

There were ceremonies in 1999 and 2001 before the Hall of Fame bought their current home, the Canada Southern Railway Station at 750 Talbot Street, St. Thomas, Ontario, Canada.

Originally, the first induction ceremonies of 1999 and 2001 took place at the St. Thomas Public Library. Since the acquisition of the Station as a home for NARFH, there have been induction ceremonies in 2006, 2008, 2010 and 2012 with additional inductions every two years.

=== Inductees ===
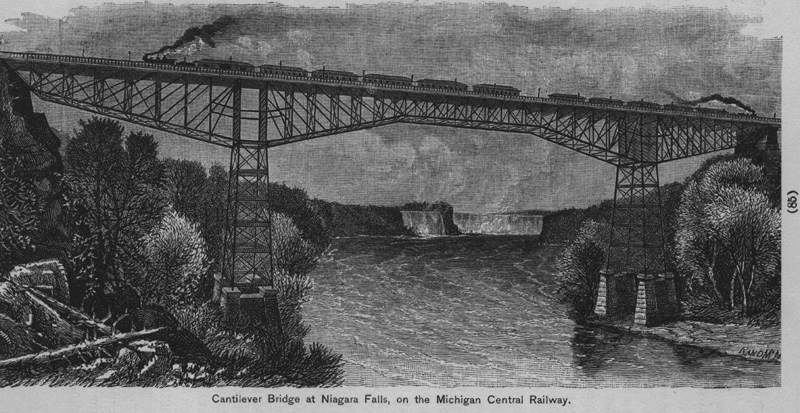
The Niagara Cantilever Bridge, ca. 1895, inducted in 2006

Inductees into the North America Hall of Fame can take the form of people, events, art forms equipment or a facility or structure. It could be the first (the first engine built in Canada) or the last (the last spike)... of something or a defining work of art that contributes to the world of the railway. Inductees include the Toronto No. 2—the first engine built in Canada, American railroad tycoon Cornelius Vanderbilt, Grand Central Terminal and Toronto's Union Station. Canadian singer-songwriter Gordon Lightfoot shares a place of prominence in the Hall of Fame with the Brotherhood of Porters and Redcaps and Sir John A. Macdonald.

All inductees are displayed virtually on the NARHF website. Inductees will be on display within the brick and mortar facility at the Canada Southern Railway Station in St. Thomas, Ontario.where tourist can visit both the Hall of Fame and the restored railway station. NARHF also has an interactive virtual device to learn more about those inducted into the Hall of Fame.

A complete list of inductees is available at the List of North America Railway Hall of Fame inductees.
