= 2012 Michigan ballot proposals =

The Michigan ballot proposals in 2012 included a referendum on a law passed by the Michigan Legislature and five proposed amendments to the Michigan Constitution. All six proposals were defeated.

== Proposal 1 ==
Proposal 1 was a referendum on Public Act 4 of 2011, the emergency manager law, and it resulted in the law's repeal.

P.A. 4 of 2011 was passed by the Michigan Legislature in March 2011 and was signed by Governor Rick Snyder on March 16. It established criteria to assess the financial condition of local government units, including school districts, authorized the Governor to appoint an emergency manager (EM) upon state finding of a financial emergency, and allow the EM to act in place of local government officials, required the EM to develop financial and operating plans, which may include modification or termination of contracts, reorganization of government, and determination of expenditures, services, and use of assets until the emergency is resolved, or, alternatively, authorized a state-appointed review team to enter into a local government approved consent decree.

Proposal 1
- A referendum on Public Act 4 of 2011 – the emergency manager law.

Results
Choice	Votes	%
Yes	2,130,354	47.33%
No	2,370,601	52.67%
Total votes	4,500,955	100.00%

Yes
60–70%
50–60%
No
70–80%
60–70%
50–60%

== Proposal 2 ==
Proposal 2 was a proposed constitutional amendment which would have granted public and private employees the constitutional right to organize and bargain collectively through labor unions, invalidated existing or future state or local laws that limited the ability to join unions and bargain collectively, and to negotiate and enforce collective bargaining agreements, including employees’ financial support of their labor unions, overridden state laws that regulate hours and conditions of employment to the extent that those laws conflict with collective bargaining agreements, and defined "employer" as a person or entity employing one or more employees. Laws may still have been enacted to prohibit public employees from striking. The proposal failed 57%-43%.

Proposal 2
- A proposal to amend the state constitution regarding collective bargaining.

Results
Choice	Votes	%
Yes	1,949,513	42.60%
No	2,626,731	57.40%
Total votes	4,576,244	100.00%

Yes
70–80%
60–70%
50–60%
No
70–80%
60–70%
50–60%

== Proposal 3 ==
Proposal 3 was a proposed constitutional amendment which would have required electric utilities to provide at least 25% of their annual retail sales of electricity from renewable energy sources, which are wind, solar, biomass, and hydropower, by 2025, limited to not more than 1% per year electric utility rate increases charged to consumers only to achieve compliance with the renewable energy standard, allowed annual extensions of the deadline to meet the 25% standard in order to prevent rate increases over the 1% limit, and required the Legislature to enact additional laws to encourage the use of Michigan made equipment and employment of Michigan residents.

Proposal 3
- A proposal to amend the state constitution to establish a standard for renewable energy.

Results
Choice	Votes	%
Yes	1,721,279	37.72%
No	2,842,000	62.28%
Total votes	4,563,279	100.00%
County Results
Yes
50–60%
No
70–80%
60–70%
50–60%

== Proposal 4 ==
Proposal 4 was a proposed constitutional amendment which would have allowed in-home care workers to bargain collectively with the Michigan Quality Home Care Council (MQHCC), continued the current exclusive representative of in-home care workers until modified in accordance with labor laws, require MQHCC to provide training for in-home care workers, create a registry of workers who pass background checks, and provide financial services to patients to manage the cost of in-home care, preserved patients' rights to hire in-home care workers who are not referred from the MQHCC registry who are bargaining unit members, and authorized the MQHCC to set minimum compensation standards and terms and conditions of employment.

Proposal 4
- A proposal to amend the state constitution to establish the Michigan Quality Home Care Council and provide collective bargaining for in-home care workers.

Results
Choice	Votes	%
Yes	1,985,595	43.77%
No	2,550,420	56.23%
Total votes	4,536,015	100.00%
County Results
Yes
60–70%
50–60%
No
70–80%
60–70%
50–60%

== Proposal 5 ==
Proposal 5 was a proposed constitutional amendment which would have required a 2/3 majority vote of the State House and the State Senate, or a statewide vote of the people at a November election, in order for the State of Michigan to impose new or additional taxes on taxpayers or expand the base of taxation or increasing the rate of taxation. This section was in no way to be construed to limit or modify tax limitations otherwise created in the Constitution.

Proposal 5
- A proposal to amend the state constitution to limit the enactment of new taxes by state government.

Results
Choice	Votes	%
Yes	1,410,944	31.24%
No	3,105,649	68.76%
Total votes	4,516,593	100.00%
County Results
Yes
50–60%
No
70–80%
60–70%
50–60%

== Proposal 6 ==
Proposal 6 was a proposed constitutional amendment which would have required the approval of a majority of voters at a statewide election and in each municipality where "new international bridges or tunnels for motor vehicles" are to be located before the State of Michigan may expend state funds or resources for acquiring land, designing, soliciting bids for, constructing, financing, or promoting new international bridges or tunnels, and created a definition of "new international bridges or tunnels for motor vehicles" that means, "any bridge or tunnel which is not open to the public and serving traffic as of January 1, 2012." That proposal was spearheaded by Manuel Moroun who controlled the Ambassador Bridge in an attempt to stop construction of what became the Gordie Howe International Bridge.

Proposal 6
- A proposal to amend the state constitution regarding construction of international bridges and tunnels.

Results
Choice	Votes	%
Yes	1,853,127	40.70%
No	2,699,558	59.30%
Total votes	4,552,685	100.00%
County Results
Yes
50–60%
No
60–70%
50–60%
