= Moroun (surname) =

Moroun is a surname. Notable people with the surname include:

- Manuel Moroun (June 5, 1927 – July 12, 2020) American billionaire businessman
- Matthew Moroun (born 1972 or 1973) is an American billionaire businessman, father of Manuel
