= Detroit–Windsor Bridge =

The Detroit–Windsor Bridge may refer to:

- Ambassador Bridge, privately owned crossing operating since 1929 between I-75 in Detroit and Ontario Highway 3 in downtown Windsor
- Gordie Howe International Bridge, Detroit River crossing under construction between Detroit and Windsor
