= Mark R. McQueen =

President and CEO of CIBC Innovation Banking (born 1965)

Mark McQueen
- Born: 1965 (age 60–61)
- Other name: Mark R. McQueen
- Occupation: venture fund manager CIBC Innovation Banking Boss
- Known for: appointed to influential offices

Mark McQueen is the president and CEO of CIBC Innovation Banking, who has been appointed to board positions in public agencies related to transport. In 2009, he was appointed chair of the Toronto Port Authority, and in 2014 he was appointed the chair of the Windsor-Detroit Bridge Authority.

== Early years ==
In 1982, when McQueen was 16, Time published a photo he took of Queen Elizabeth and Prince Philip, when they were on an official visit to Ottawa.

In a 2009 profile in the Toronto Star, Linda Diebel noted that comments 21-year-old McQueen made from the floor during the 1986 convention that chose Brian Mulroney as the leader of Progressive Conservative Party caught the attention of Mulroney, and lead to a coverage of McQueen in a column by Dalton Camp.

== Career ==
When Mulroney became Prime Minister, McQueen worked in the Prime Minister's Office, as Chief of Staff Hugh Segal's executive assistant.

After leaving the PMO in 1993, Matthew Barrett, then the chair of the Bank of Montreal encouraged him to go into banking. McQueen worked briefly as a teller, before joining the bank's fund management department. In 2000 he founded his own investment fund, Wellington Financial.

In 2008 McQueen was appointed to the Toronto Port Authority. On July 30, 2014, Lisa Raitt, Minister of Transport, appointed McQueen the chair of the Windsor-Detroit Bridge Authority, together with two other directors, and the authority's president and CEO. While noting that McQueen and the other three appointees did have significant financial expertise, they noted that none of the appointees had ties to the Windsor region. Tom Mulcair, leader of the opposition in the Canadian Parliament, noted that three of the first four appointees were donors to the Conservative Party of Canada.

Ed Arditti, of the online news site Windsor Square suggested McQueen's appointment was linked to the Mulroney administration's struggles with Matty Moroun, who owned the Ambassador Bridge, the original bridge over the Detroit River. McQueen was replaced as chair of the Windsor-Detroit Bridge Authority by former Liberal MPP Dwight Duncan on January 1, 2016.
