= Matthew Moroun =

American businessman (born 1972 or 1973)

Matthew T. Moroun
- Born: 1972 or 1973 (age 53–54)
- Education: Dickinson College
- Known for: Owner of the Ambassador Bridge
- Spouse: Lindsay S. Moroun
- Children: Matthew J. Moroun
- Father: Manuel Moroun

Matthew T. Moroun (born 1972 or 1973) is an American billionaire businessman. He is the owner of the Moroun family transportation empire and the Ambassador Bridge connecting Detroit, Michigan, and Windsor, Ontario, after inheriting control from his father Manuel Moroun in 2020. Forbes put the Moroun family net worth at $1.5 billion in 2020.

== Early life ==
Moroun earned a degree in economics from Dickinson College in Pennsylvania in 1995.

== Gordie Howe Bridge ==
In February 2026, The New York Times reported that Moroun met with Commerce Secretary Howard Lutnick to lobby the Trump Administration to block the opening of the Gordie Howe International Bridge set to open in early 2026.

U.S. President Donald Trump subsequently threatened to block the opening of the Gordie Howe International Bridge, citing Canada's recent trade developments with China and the alleged one-sided nature of the contract (wherein Canada gains all revenue from bridge tolls to pay back construction costs). Trump's announcement was criticized by politicians, business leaders, and industry groups. The following day, Prime Minister Mark Carney discussed the bridge with Trump, detailing the joint ownership of the bridge, that construction used U.S. steel and workers, and that Canada paid for construction.

Moroun has been a prolific donor to Republican causes and Trump’s campaigns, including a $1 million donation to MAGA Inc., a super PAC dedicated to Trump, less than one month before Trump threatened to block the Gordie Howe Bridge opening. The Moroun family has opposed the construction of the Gordie Howe Bridge since its conception as it would compete for the $300 million per year toll revenue that the Moroun family collects from the Ambassador Bridge, which is located a few miles away.

== Personal life ==
Moroun has a son, Matthew J. Moroun, who has served as a director at Universal Logistics Holdings, Inc. and P.A.M. Transportation Services, Inc.
