= Gordie Howe International Bridge =

Bridge between the US and Canada

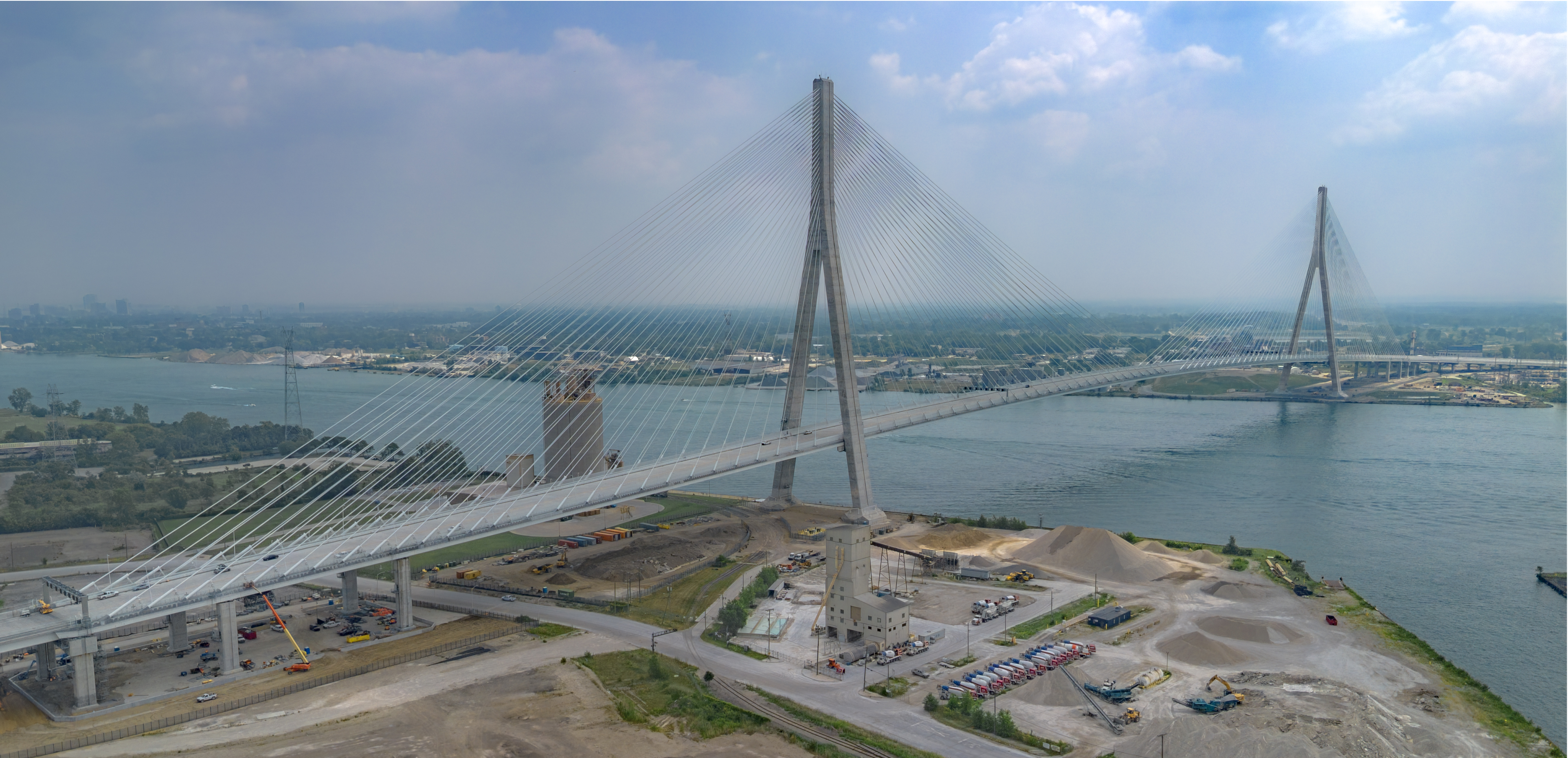
- Gordie Howe International Bridge days before its opening, July 2026
- Coordinates: 42°17′15″N 83°05′52″W
- Carries: 6 lanes connecting I-75 and Highway 401; 1 bike and pedestrian path
- Crosses: Detroit River, Canada–United States border
- Locale: Detroit, Michigan and Windsor, Ontario
- Owner: Government of Canada; State of Michigan
- Maintained by: Windsor–Detroit Bridge Authority
- Website: gordiehoweinternationalbridge.com

Characteristics
- Design: Cable-stayed bridge
- Total length: 2.5 km (1.6 mi)
- Width: 37.5 m (123 ft)
- Height: 220 m (722 ft)
- Longest span: 853 m (2,799 ft)
- Piers in water: 0
- Clearance below: 46 m (151 ft)

History
- Architect: Erik Behrens
- Construction start: June 2018
- Construction cost: CA$6.4 billion (contract cost)
- Opened: July 27, 2026; 3 months ago
- Inaugurated: July 24, 2026; 3 months ago

Statistics
- Toll: US$5.75/CA$8 for cars, US$8.75/CA$12 per axle for trucks (expected)

Location
- Interactive map of Gordie Howe International Bridge

The Gordie Howe International Bridge (French: Pont international Gordie-Howe) is a cable-stayed bridge across the Detroit River. The international crossing connects Detroit, Michigan, United States, with Windsor, Ontario, Canada, by linking Interstate 75 in Michigan with Highway 401 in Ontario (through the Rt. Hon. Herb Gray Parkway extension of Highway 401). The bridge, owned equally by Canada and the state of Michigan, provides uninterrupted freeway traffic flow, as opposed to the configuration with the nearby Ambassador Bridge that connects to city streets on the Ontario side. The bridge is named after Canadian ice hockey player Gordie Howe, whose celebrated career included 25 years with the Detroit Red Wings, and who died two years before construction began.

First proposed in the early 2000s, the project was met with prominent opposition by Ambassador Bridge owner Manuel "Matty" Moroun, who believed competition from a publicly owned bridge would reduce his revenue. A Canadian federal Crown corporation, the Windsor–Detroit Bridge Authority, was established in 2012 to coordinate the bridge's construction and management. Environmental approvals and other permits were approved in the United States and Canada in the early 2010s. The "Bridging North America" consortium was selected in July 2018 to design, build, operate and maintain the bridge, and construction began that month. The CA$3.8 billion cost of construction was funded by the Canadian federal government and will be paid for by bridge tolls. Construction of the bridge was completed in June 2026, inaugurated on July 24, 2026, and opened to traffic on July 27, 2026. In October 2026 it became the busiest border crossing between Michigan and Canada.

== History ==
Crossings of the Detroit River between Detroit, Michigan and Windsor, Ontario. Detroit is on the north bank of this stretch of river. Because Detroit is generally north and west of Windsor, people travelling from the United States to Canada travel south.
1 Detroit–Windsor Tunnel (1930)
2 Michigan Central Railway Tunnel (1910)
3 Ambassador Bridge (1929)
4 Gordie Howe International Bridge (2026)

=== Background ===
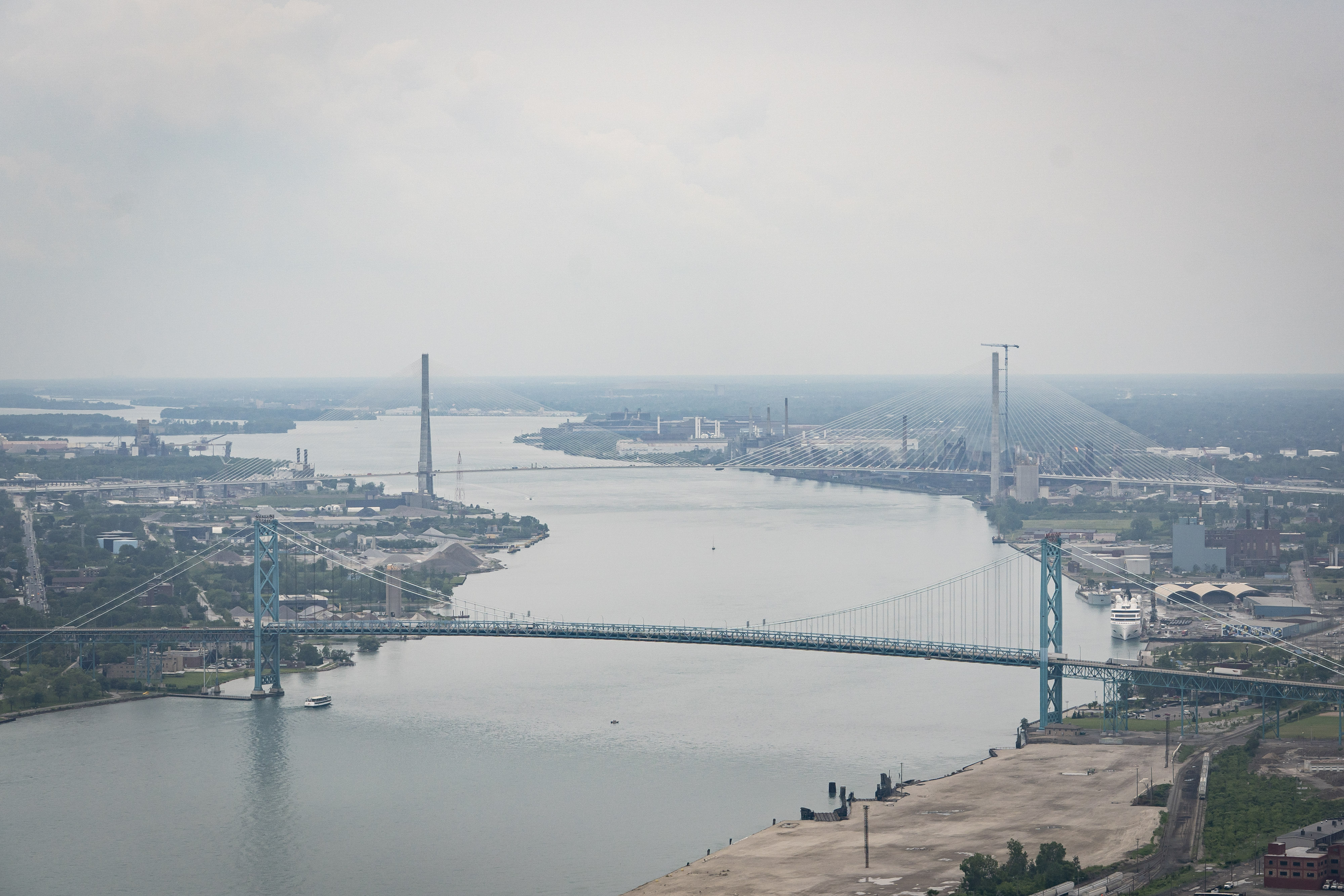
An aerial view of the Gordie Howe International Bridge with the Ambassador Bridge in the foreground, June 2025

The passage across the Detroit River between the United States and Canada has been an important traffic route since the American Civil War, with ferries transporting goods and people across the river. A railway tunnel (Michigan Central Railway Tunnel) was opened in July 1910, a suspension bridge for road traffic (Ambassador Bridge) opened in November 1929, and a road tunnel (Detroit–Windsor Tunnel) opened in 1930.

The Ambassador Bridge was the busiest crossing on the Canada–United States border, with nearly 25% of U.S.–Canada border crossings by trucks using the bridge. The Detroit crossings have particular significance for maintaining the supply chains of the automotive industries of the United States and Canada. Automotive trade between the two countries has increased from US$32 billion in 1995 to US$51 billion in 2023. The crossings play a part in the daily lives of 5,000 Canadian commuters who work in neighbouring Detroit.

The Ambassador Bridge has been criticized for its monopoly status (as large trucks are not permitted to use the tunnel), private ownership by billionaire Manuel Moroun and poor maintenance record. Both the bridge and the road tunnel lack direct highway connections on the Canadian side, with city streets and traffic lights between them and Ontario Highway 401.

=== Detroit River International Crossing ===
In the early 2000s, work was begun to investigate the need for a future crossing of the Detroit River by a bi-national partnership of the U.S. Federal Highway Administration, Transport Canada, Ontario Ministry of Transportation and the Michigan Department of Transportation (MDOT). During development, the project was known as the Detroit River International Crossing (DRIC) and the New International Trade Crossing.

In 2004, a joint announcement by the federal government of the United States and Government of Canada confirmed a new border crossing would be constructed between Detroit and Windsor. A bi-national committee was formed to manage the project. An extension of Ontario Highway 401 to the future bridge was also proposed – construction on this extension began in 2011, with the Rt. Hon. Herb Gray Parkway opening in 2015.

The various environmental approvals for the project were approved in both the United States and Canada in 2009.

In 2009, the Ohio State Senate passed a non-binding resolution expressing support for the crossing, and urged the Michigan government to pass it, due to Canada being Ohio's largest foreign trade partner, with US$35.8 billion per year in goods traded between Ohio and Canada. In 2011, the bridge was tentatively scheduled for completion in 2016, according to the Michigan Department of Transportation. It was estimated the bridge would generate $70.4 million in toll revenues in its first year of operation.

=== Michigan legislation ===
In 2010, the Michigan Senate had not approved any authorizing legislation related to the bridge. The Senate Majority Leader Mike Bishop had stated that the Senate would not vote until revenue forecasts were released, reports that were being withheld by the director of the Michigan Department of Transportation. The Michigan House of Representatives had already passed the measure while the bill was called "doomed" in the Senate.

Michigan Governor Rick Snyder supported construction of the new crossing in his first State of the State address on January 19, 2011. His plan would leverage Canadian money to receive a 160 percent match—totaling $2.2 billion—on funding from the Federal Highway Administration in a deal reached the week previous to the speech. In August 2011, Michigan State Senator Mike Kowall, when asked by the Windsor Star if enabling legislation for the bridge would currently pass, replied "absolutely not".

In October 2011, the Michigan Senate "rejected a bill [that] would have allowed the state to accept $550 million from the Canadian government to fund the country's share" of the bridge. One commentator, Bill Mann, noted the rejection, saying "Canada calls the new bridge its biggest infrastructure priority and has even offered to pay for the span. But pesky U.S. special-interest politics intrude once again", as he reviewed a number of "U.S. government actions (and inactions) that show little concern about Canadian concerns". Mann drew from a Maclean's article sub-titled "We used to be friends" about U.S.–Canada relations after the Keystone Pipeline, the bridge, and other "insulting" decisions.

In June 2012, Canadian Prime Minister Stephen Harper and Michigan Governor Rick Snyder announced an agreement allowing the project to proceed. The Canadian federal government would fund bridge construction, land acquisition in Michigan and the construction of Interstate 75 on-ramps. The Canadian contribution will be repaid from bridge tolls collected on the Canadian side, and no tolls will be charged on the U.S. side. The crossing agreement also included community benefits for residents on both sides of the Detroit River, including improvements to local neighbourhoods affected by bridge construction. Although paid for by Canada, the bridge would be owned equally by Canada and the state of Michigan.

=== Approvals and land acquisition ===
Crossing the bridge from the Canadian side heading towards the American side

On April 12, 2013, the Obama administration granted Michigan the permit required to build the bridge, allowing construction to go forward once details were finalized. In May 2014, the United States Coast Guard issued a bridge permit, the final federal approval required. A Canadian federal Crown corporation, the Windsor–Detroit Bridge Authority (WDBA) began work in July 2014 to coordinate the bridge's construction and management.

The Canadian government allocated US$25 million to begin land acquisition on the Detroit side on May 22, 2013. In January 2015, Parsons Corporation was named the general engineering consultant for the bridge. On February 18, 2015, Minister of Transport Lisa Raitt announced Canada would fund the construction of a customs plaza on the U.S. side of the bridge in Detroit's Delray neighborhood. The plaza would have a budget of around US$250 million, and be recouped through tolls. The U.S. Department of Homeland Security would provide a first-year investment of US$150 million, and an "ongoing annual requirement" of US$50 million, to cover the plaza's operational and staffing costs.

On May 14, 2015, during an event attended by Canadian Prime Minister Stephen Harper, it was officially announced that the bridge would be known as the Gordie Howe International Bridge after Canadian ice hockey player Gordie Howe, whose career included twenty-five years with the Detroit Red Wings.

In July 2015, WDBA began work procuring a consortium who would design, build and finance the construction of the bridge, as well as operate and maintain it over a 30-year period. The cost of building the Gordie Howe International Bridge escalated by CA$3.5 billion as the value of the Canadian dollar declined in 2015–2016. In January 2016, it was reported, due to exchange rates and increased inflation, costs could rise to CA$4.8 billion.

In July 2016, it was announced many properties that would be required to build the bridge were still in the hands of private landowners. Some properties on the American side of the river were owned by Manuel Moroun, owner of the Ambassador Bridge. An estimated 30 of the 900 properties needed were considered to be problems if the owners resist selling. In July 2016, CBC News reported that Dwight Duncan, the former finance minister for Ontario, had advised the Government of Canada to consider buying the Ambassador Bridge from Moroun.

In a joint statement released after a meeting between newly elected U.S. president Donald Trump and Canadian prime minister Justin Trudeau on February 13, 2017, the two governments reiterated the support of the "expeditious completion" of the project. It was listed as a priority infrastructure project by the Trump administration.

In June 2017, the City of Detroit sold 36 city-owned parcels of land, underground assets and five miles of city-owned streets in the Delray neighborhood, which is the site of the U.S. Customs facility. A US$33 million neighborhood improvement fund for the neighborhood was set up. Residents of the area can stay and have their home renovated or move to a renovated home in a different neighborhood.

In May 2018, the Michigan Court of Appeals ruled against Moroun's attempt to stop expropriations on the Michigan side of the river, allowing construction of the U.S. plaza to begin.

=== Construction ===
Construction progress of the Gordie Howe International Bridge

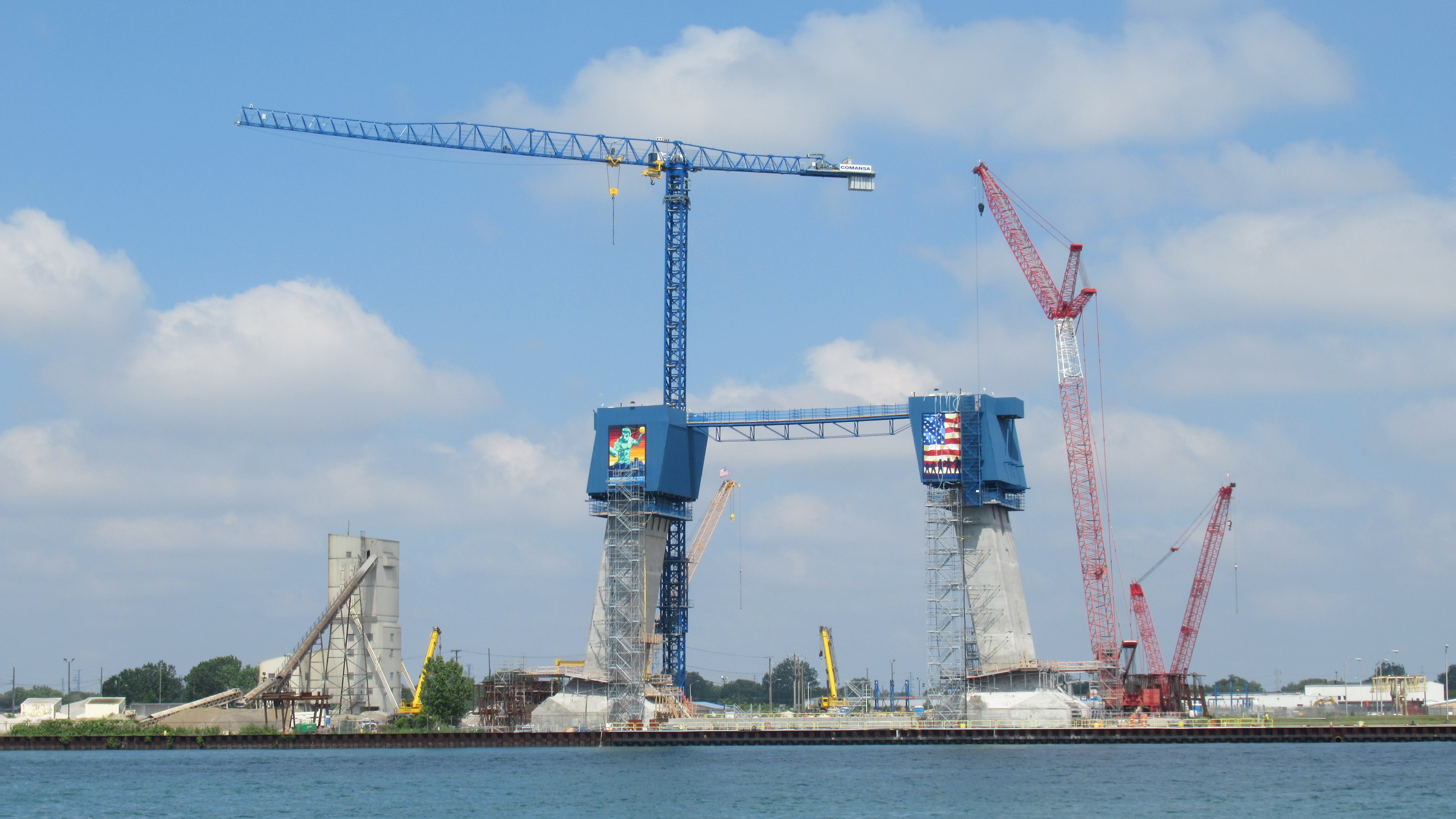
Early construction of the support towers, as shown on the American side in June 2021

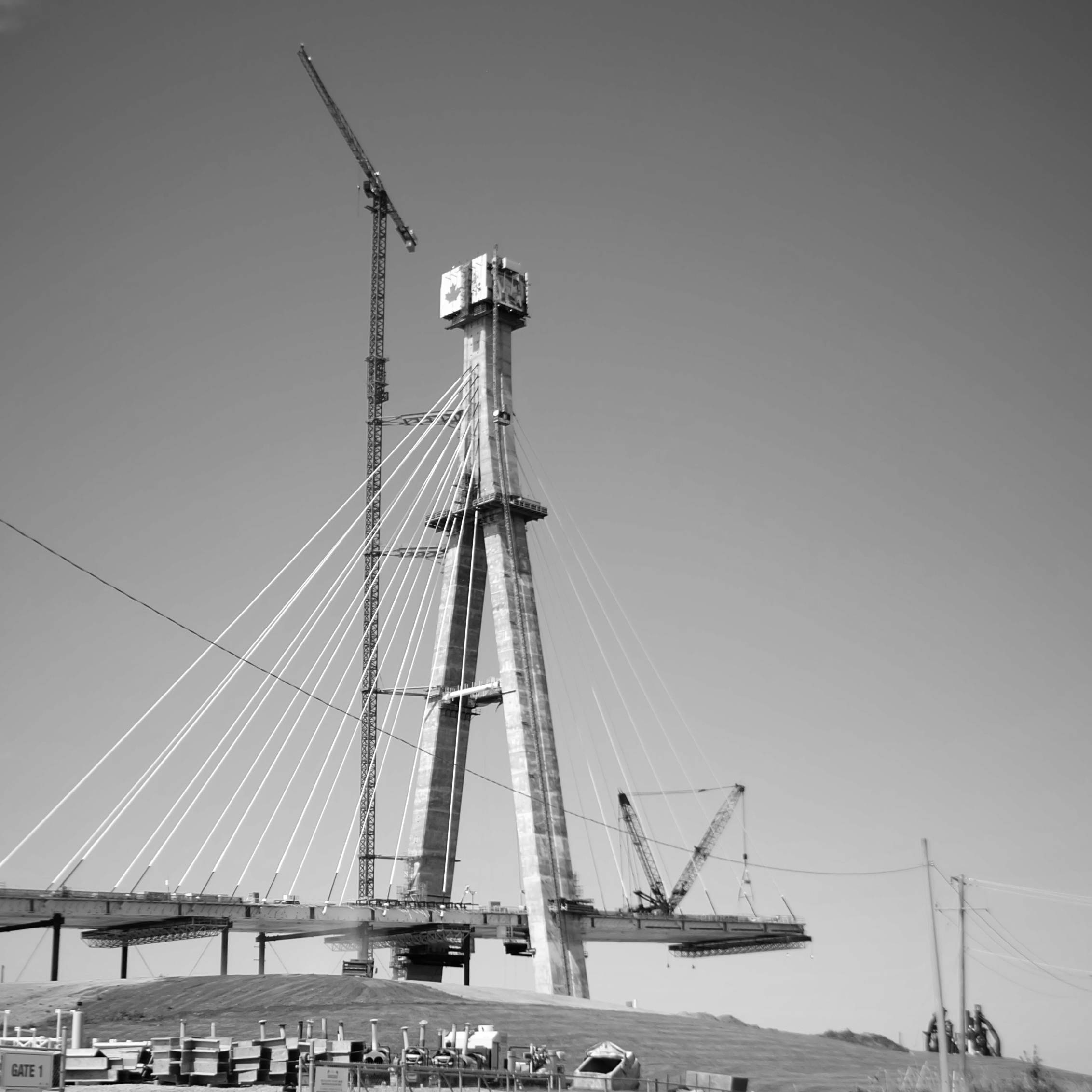
Bridge deck being installed on the Canadian side in May 2023

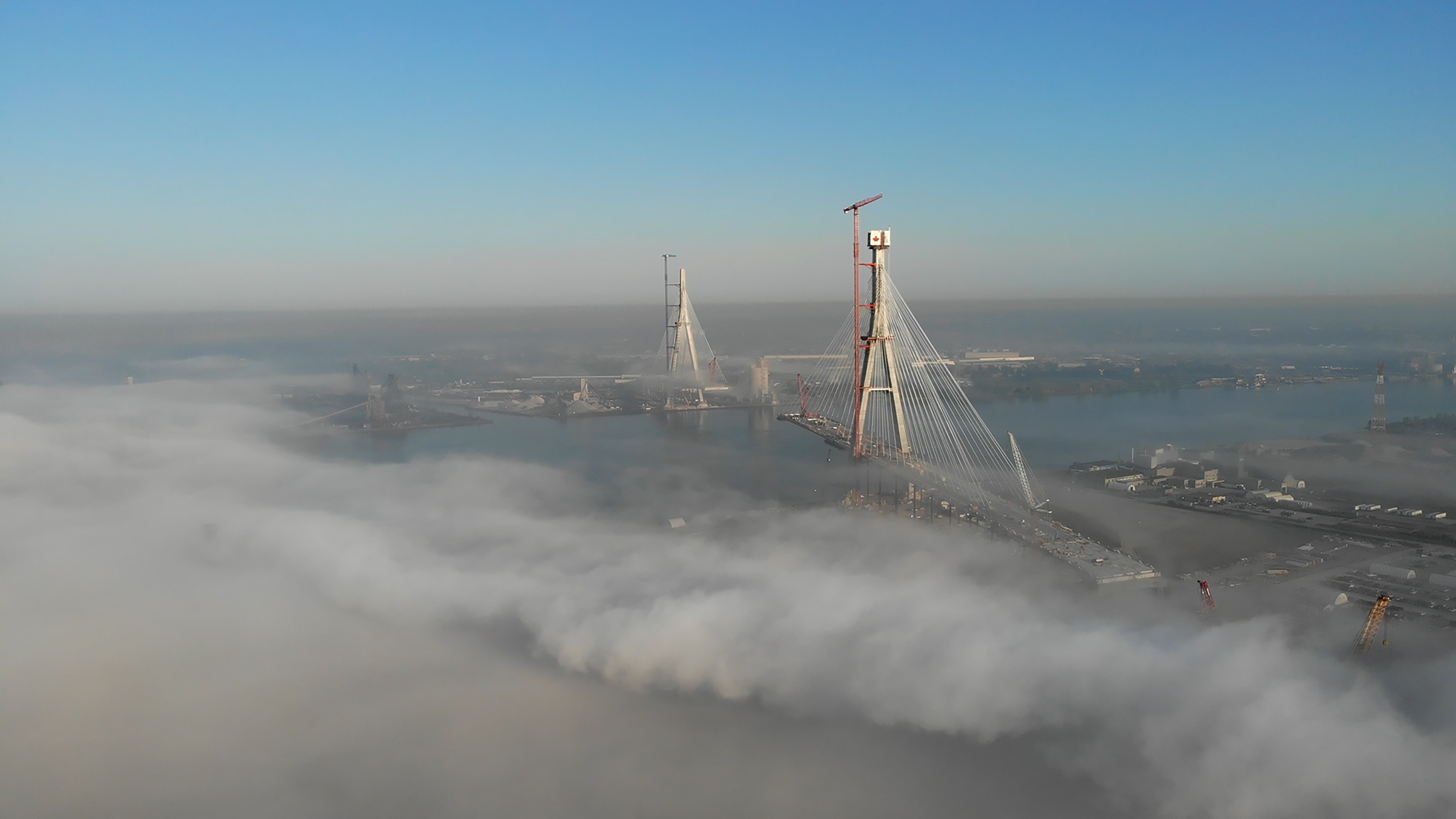
Progress as of January 2024, with both support towers nearly completed

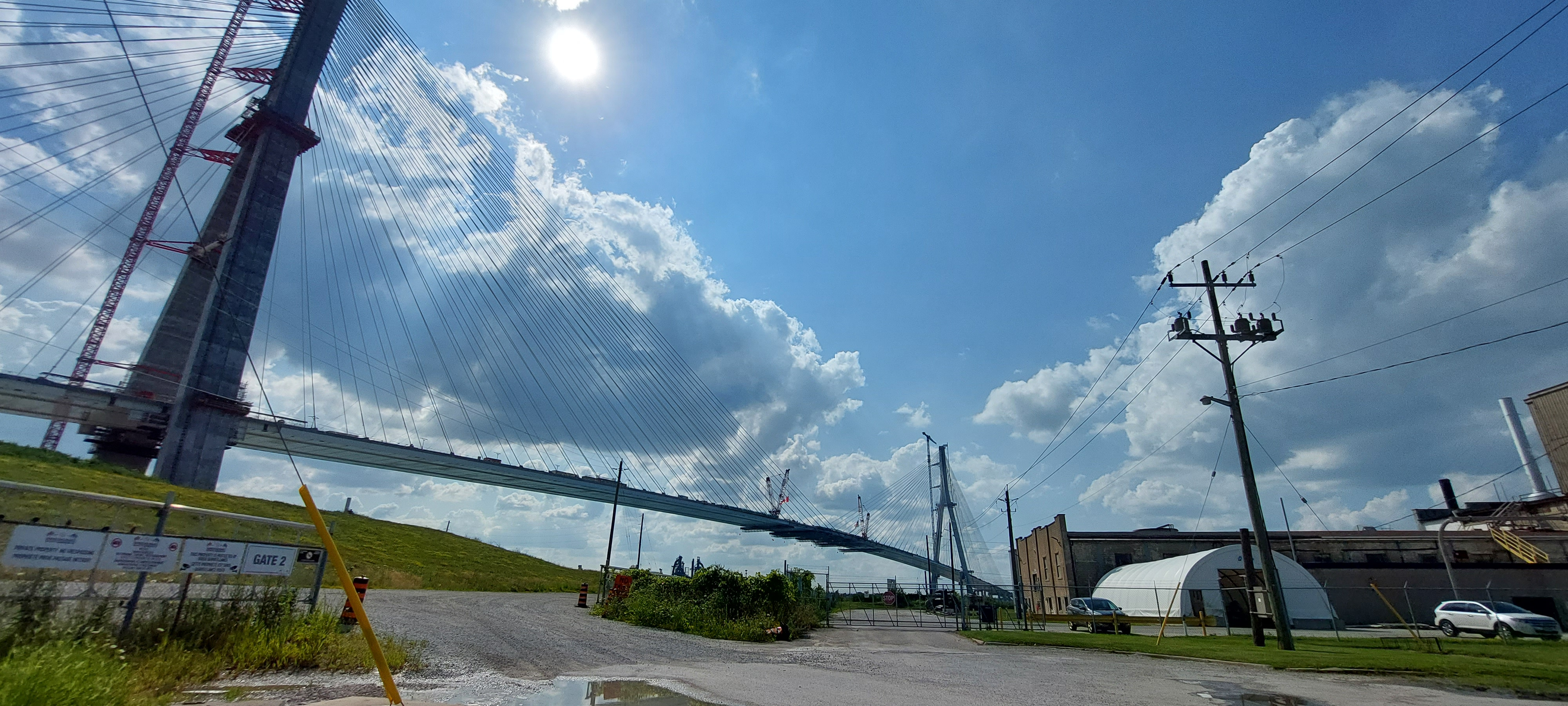
The linking of the sides of the bridge in July 2024

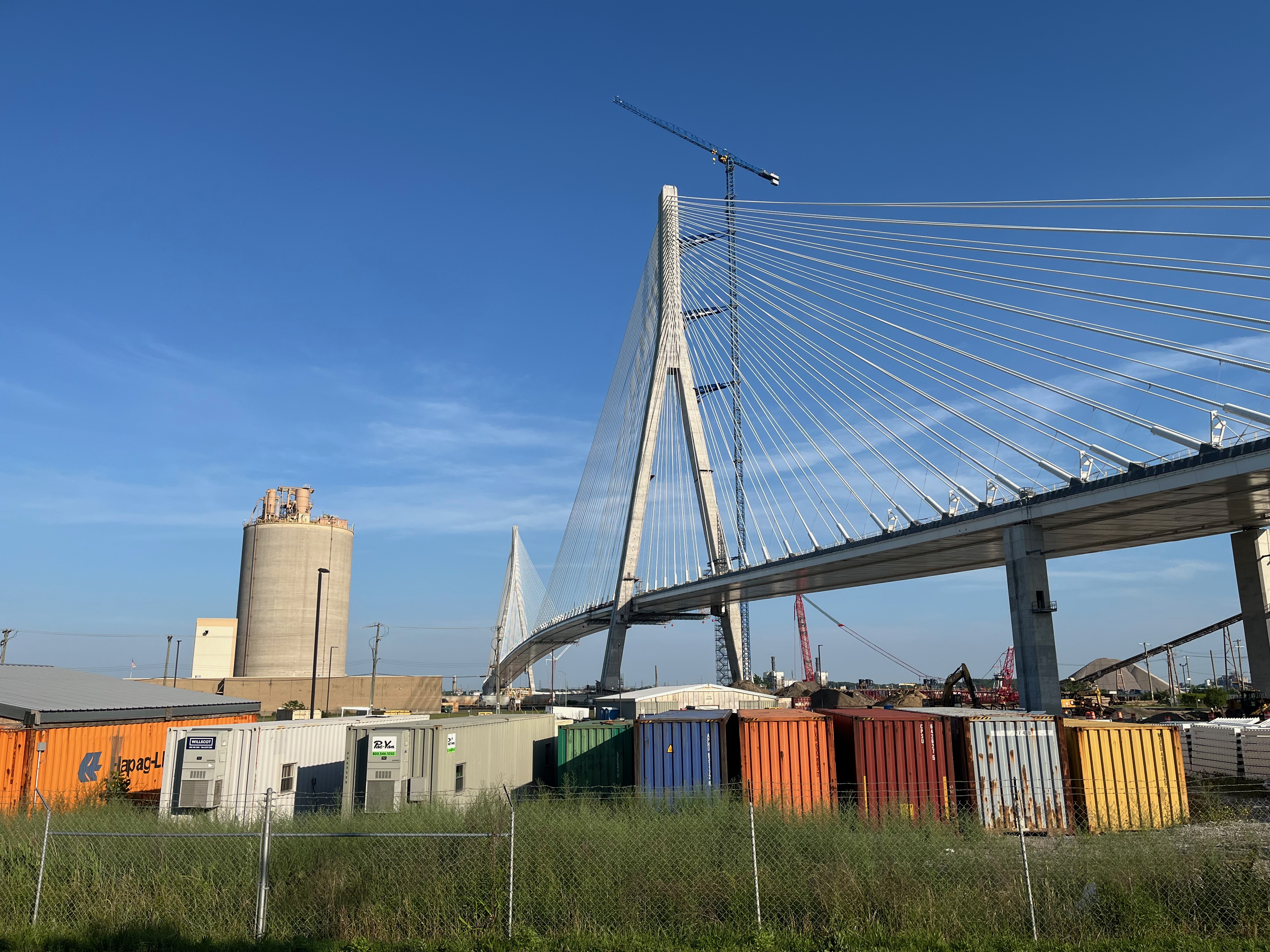
Nearing completion in June 2025

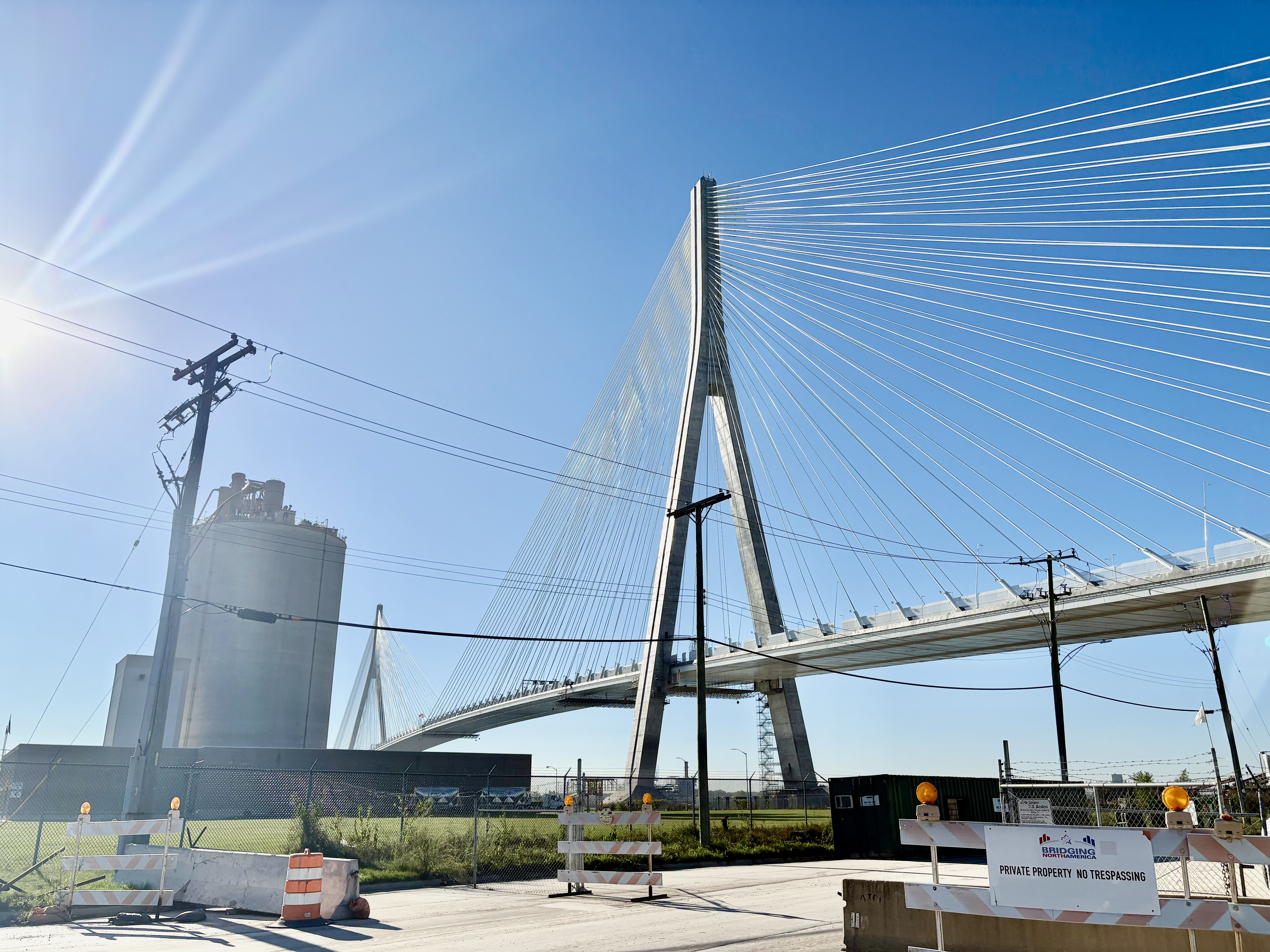
The bridge in late September 2025, shown with the cranes removed from both support towers

On July 5, 2018, WDBA announced that the consortium Bridging North America had been awarded the bridge contract, using a design, build, finance, operate and maintain structure. The consortium consisted of AECOM for design; Dragados Canada, Fluor Corporation, and Aecon for construction; and ACS Infrastructure, Fluor, and Aecon for operations and maintenance. Following construction, Bridging North America will receive monthly payments for operating and maintaining the bridge over a 30 year period.

Construction began on July 17, 2018, with groundbreaking by Minister of Infrastructure Amarjeet Sohi and Michigan Governor Rick Snyder. On September 28, 2018, the WDBA announced the project would cost CA$3.8 billion to construct, part of a CA$5.7 billion contract with Bridging North America. The bridge was to be completed by the end of 2024.

In 2019, preparatory work for major construction continued, with cleaning of contaminated land. An effort by the Michigan Republican Party to prevent MDOT spending money on the bridge (even if MDOT would later be reimbursed by Canada) was reversed, allowing the project to continue. CA$20 million of community benefits for local residents on both sides of the Detroit River was also announced.

In 2020, the design of new pedestrian bridges over Interstate 75 were unveiled, and work began on the foundations for the bridge towers. Construction was impacted by the COVID-19 pandemic, with changes to working practices, travel restrictions and material shortages. In January 2021, foundation work for the bridge towers had been completed, and construction of the 220-metre (722 ft) bridge towers was underway. In March 2021, work began to construct the buildings in the Canadian port of entry.

In March 2022, the legs of the bridge towers on both sides of the Detroit River were completed, and road deck construction got underway. By November 2022, over 150 m (490 ft) of the bridge towers had been completed. In May 2023, installation of the cables used to hold up the future bridge deck began. The US bridge tower reached its final height of 220 m (722 ft) in August 2023, with the Canadian bridge tower completed in December 2023. In October 2023, the WDBA explained that major construction would likely be completed by the end of 2024, with elements such as signs and lighting taking another six months to install. WDBA also noted that around 2,300 people were working on the site at the peak of construction.

It was also confirmed that the bridge deck would be completed in 2024. The two sides were permanently connected during the early morning hours of June 14, 2024. The occasion was marked with a handshake between a Canadian and an American steelworker. By June 2025, 95% of construction had been completed, with workers disassembling construction cranes, and planning to test the lighting on the bridge.

In October 2025, officials stated that the bridge will not be open to traffic until "early 2026", and by February 2026, major construction on the bridge had been completed. Drew Dilkens, the mayor of Windsor, described the timing of the anticipated opening as "dreadful", given the ongoing strains in bilateral relations between the United States and Canada. The U.S. Department of Homeland Security published an entry in the Federal Register establishing the bridge as an official port of entry on March 2, 2026, marking one of the final administrative steps needed for opening. In April 2026, around 3,300 tests still needed to be performed at both port of entries before the bridge would be allowed to open.

=== Announcement of toll rates ===
In March 2026, bridge operators announced fees of less than half those charged for the Ambassador Bridge and cheaper than those for the Detroit–Windsor Tunnel. One-way toll rates were announced as US$5.75 or CA$8 for passenger vehicles, and commercial vehicles as US$8.75 or CA$12 per axle. When towing a small trailer, an additional toll of US$5.75 or CA$8 is applied per trailer. A 25% discount will be applied for electronic pass holders reducing the cost to US$4.35 or CA$6 for passenger vehicles, and reducing commercial vehicle tolls to US$6.90 or CA$9 per axle. Use of the bicycle and walking path will be free.

When announced in March 2026, the toll rates were lower than that of the nearby crossings – such as the privately-owned Ambassador Bridge (US$10 for passenger vehicles, US$20 per axle for commercial vehicles) and the publicly-owned Detroit-Windsor Tunnel (US$9 or CA$8.25 for passenger vehicles, and commercial vehicles ranging from US$10 to US$44 or CA$11.75 to CA$62.35). In April, the company responsible for the Ambassador Bridge announced that it will be reducing pre-paid tolls for cars and motorcycles by almost half (US$5.50 US or CA$7.50); cash rates will remain unchanged for passenger vehicles.

=== Delayed opening ===
In January 2024, the WDBA announced that the bridge would open by fall 2025, a delay of 10 months from the planned opening date owing to delays caused by the COVID-19 pandemic. CA$700 million of additional costs would be met by the Canadian government.

On February 8, 2026, Trump threatened to block the opening of the bridge, citing Canada's recent trade developments with China and the alleged one-sided nature of the contract (wherein Canada gains all revenue from bridge tolls to pay back construction costs). Trump's announcement was criticized by politicians, business leaders and industry groups. The following day, Prime Minister Mark Carney discussed the bridge with Trump, detailing the joint ownership of the bridge, that construction used Canadian and U.S. steel and workers, and that Canada paid for construction.

The New York Times subsequently reported that billionaire Matthew Moroun (who owns the Ambassador Bridge) had lobbied the Trump administration prior to the announcement. The ranking member of the United States House Oversight Committee, Robert Garcia, opened an investigation into Commerce Secretary Howard Lutnick’s earlier meeting with Moroun, sending Lutnick a letter requesting communications related to that meeting. Filings released February 20 showed that Moroun donated US$1 million to MAGA Inc., a Trump-affiliated super PAC, less than a month before Trump's announcement.

In June, The Detroit News reported that invitations were being sent out for a ribbon-cutting ceremony on June 12, with the bridge open to the public shortly after. On the day before the planned ceremony it was announced that the event had been cancelled and that the opening of the bridge was delayed indefinitely to "resolve any outstanding issues". Carney said that the delay had been requested by the United States, and representatives for Trump stated that his position had not changed since February. The Globe and Mail reported that Moroun was in talks with Lutnick and U.S. Ambassador to Canada Pete Hoekstra, to facilitate a deal "to ensure the Ambassador doesn’t lose all of its toll revenue to the Gordie Howe." On July 4, Ambassador Hoekstra denied that the delayed opening had anything to do with the Morouns.

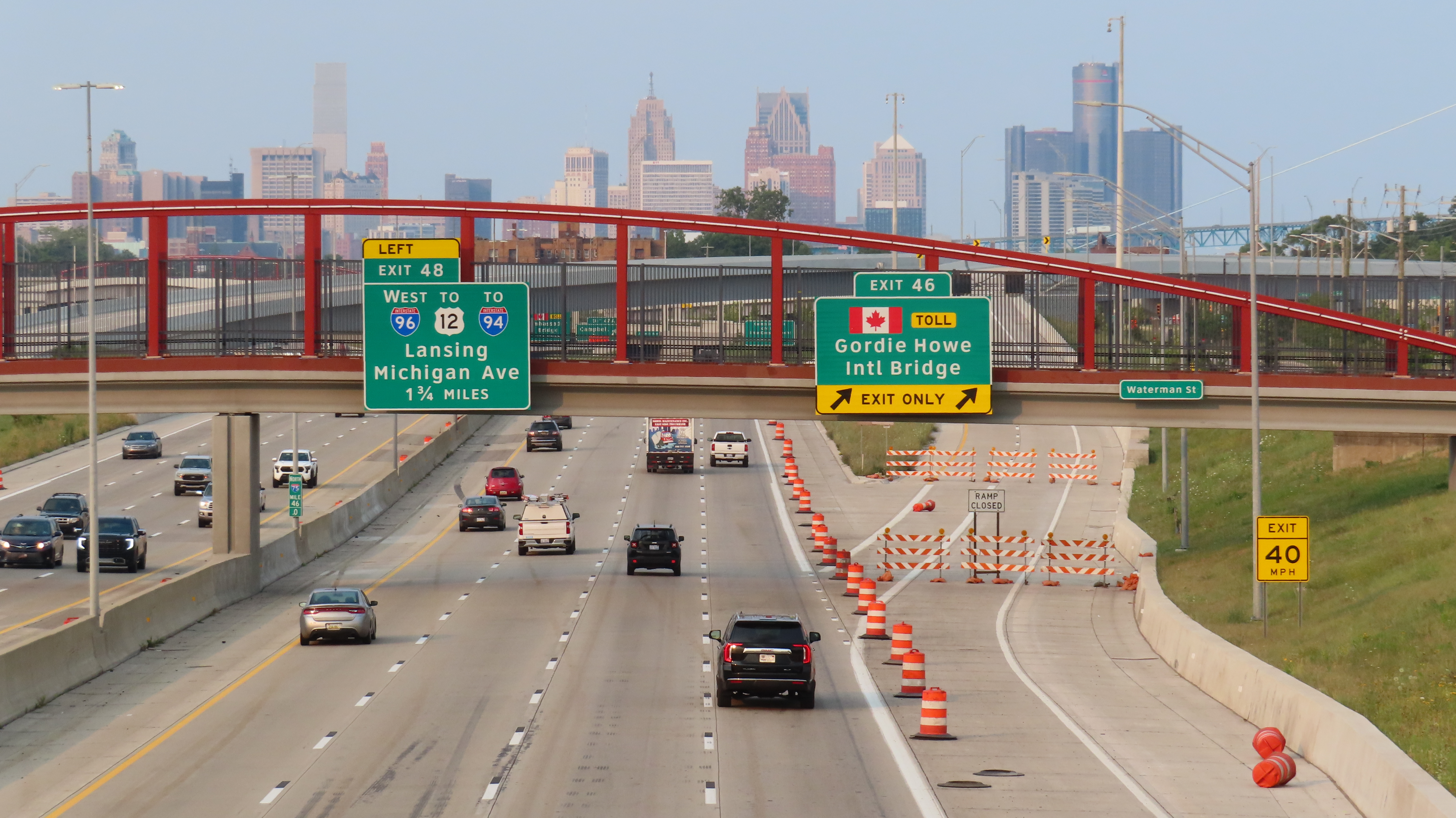
Ramp from northbound Interstate 75 to the bridge, blocked by barricades, the evening before the bridge's opening

On July 10, Canada’s Housing and Infrastructure Department and Michigan Governor Gretchen Whitmer jointly announced that the bridge would open on July 27. The announcement followed a new toll-revenue agreement under which Canada would receive half of the bridge's toll revenue profits during its first 15 years of operation, with the other half allocated to a "regional economic development fund" in the United States. The agreement also provided that the WDBA would seek U.S. agreement for toll-rate changes, such as increases of 10 per cent or more and reductions below the rates charged at comparable regional crossings. Carney later clarified that only "net profits" would be split, and this would be calculated as toll revenue minus both operating expenses and scheduled payments on the bridge’s construction debt, adding that "there’s not going to be a lot of net to split". The tentative agreement between Canada and the U.S. released on July 22 gives the U.S. 50% of the net toll revenues "after operational costs" for 15 years towards an economic development fund under their sole control.

On July 24, Canadian officials ceremonially opened the bridge without the attendance of U.S. officials. The bridge opened to traffic at noon local time on July 27.

In October 2026, the bridge surpassed the Ambassador Bridge in traffic and became Michigan's busiest border crossing with Canada.

== Windsor–Detroit Bridge Authority ==
Windsor–Detroit Bridge Authority
- Type: Crown corporation
- Founded: 2012; 14 years ago
- Headquarters: Windsor, Ontario, Canada
- Key people: Chuck Andary (Interim CEO); Marie Campagna (Chair)
- Owner: Government of Canada
- Website: wdbridge.com/corporate

The Windsor–Detroit Bridge Authority (WDBA; French: Autorité du pont Windsor-Détroit APWD) is a Canadian federal Crown corporation that is responsible for administering the construction and operation of the bridge. The WDBA manages the bridge's operation, including setting and collecting tolls.

To coordinate the bridge's construction and management, the Windsor–Detroit Bridge Authority (WDBA) was formed in 2012, beginning work in July 2014.

Lisa Raitt, then-Minister of Transport, appointed Michael Cautillo, Mark R. McQueen, William Graham, and Caroline Mulroney Lapham as the first board of directors of the WDBA. Of the board members, Cautillo was appointed the authority's president and CEO and McQueen was appointed chairman of the board. While recognizing that the individuals first appointed to the body on July 30, 2014, all had strong financial expertise, the Windsor Star noted that none of them had local ties to the Windsor region.

Tom Mulcair, New Democratic Party leader and then-Leader of the Official Opposition in the Parliament of Canada, noted that three of the first four appointees were donors to the Conservative Party of Canada.

On January 1, 2016, retired Provincial Liberal Minister Dwight Duncan was appointed to be the interim chair of the Board. On December 14, 2016, he was appointed to a five-year term as the Board's permanent chair. In December 2021, Tim Murphy was appointed as the chair of the board, with Duncan leaving the post after 5 years. In February 2025, former Chief Financial Officer of Hôtel-Dieu Grace Healthcare Marie Campagna was appointed as the chair of the board, with Murphy leaving in September 2024.

=== Bridge contract ===
In July 2015, WDBA began work procuring a consortium who would design, build and finance the construction of the bridge, as well as operate and maintain it over a 30 year period.

On July 5, 2018, WDBA was announced the consortium "Bridging North America" had been awarded the contract for the bridge, using a design, build, finance, operate and maintain structure. The consortium consisted of AECOM for design; Dragados Canada, Fluor Corporation, and Aecon for construction; and ACS Infrastructure, Fluor, and Aecon for operations and maintenance. Following construction, Bridging North America will receive monthly payments for operating and maintaining the bridge over a 30-year period. On September 28, 2018, the WDBA announced the project would cost CA$3.8 billion to construct, part of a CA$5.7 billion contract with Bridging North America.

== Design ==
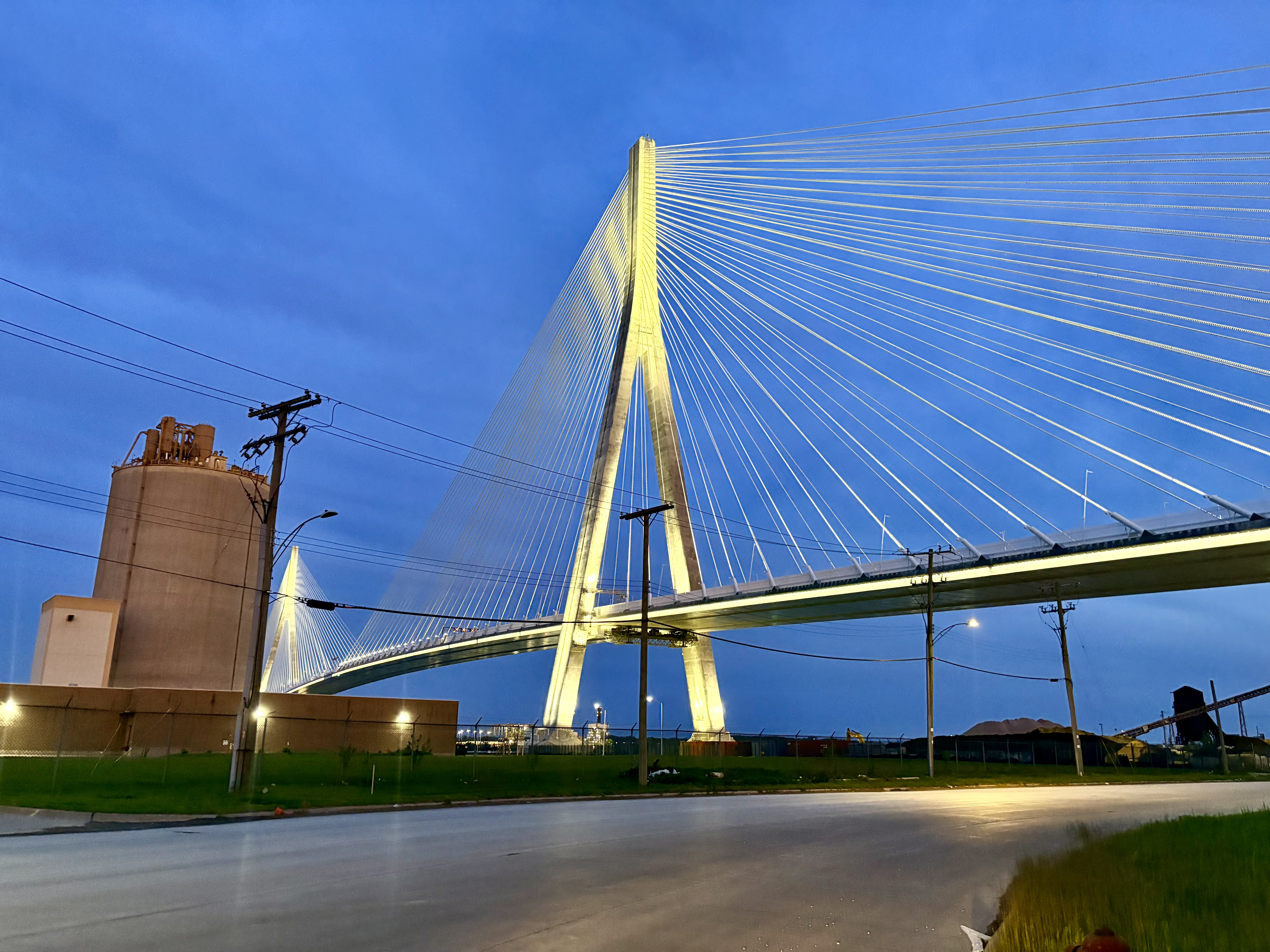
The bridge at night in May 2026

The cable-stayed bridge design is by chief bridge architect of AECOM Erik Behrens. Each of its two A-shaped bridge towers, standing 220 m (722 ft) tall, was built on opposite banks of the Detroit River. These towers were designed to resemble hockey sticks when swung for a slapshot. The road deck itself is held up using 216 cable stays. It has the longest main span of any cable-stayed bridge in North America at 853 m (2,800 ft), with a total bridge length of 2.5 km (1.6 mi). At the highest point above the Detroit River, the bridge is 46 m (151 ft) above the water. The bridge has six lanes for automotive traffic, and a bicycle and walking path.

On the U.S side, the port of entry encompasses 68 hectares (170 acres) with border inspection facilities directly connecting to Interstate 75 with dedicated highway ramps. It has 36 primary inspection lanes at the U.S. facility, of which 21 are designated for passenger vehicles and bus traffic; 35 secondary inspection bays; and designated lanes for NEXUS and FAST passholders. On the Canadian side, the port of entry encompasses 53 hectares (130 acres) with border inspection facilities, toll collection and bridge maintenance facilities directly connecting to Ontario Highway 401. The Canadian facility has 24 primary inspection lanes, of which 12 are for passenger vehicles and bus traffic; 12 secondary examination lanes for commercial traffic; and dedicated lanes for NEXUS and FAST travelers. The bicycle and walking path connect to new and existing trails as well as bike lanes on both sides of the Detroit River.

Transport Canada retained the engineering firms Morrison Hershfield, Davis Langdon, and Delcan to develop cost estimates for right of way and utility relocation; design and construction; and operation and maintenance on the Canadian side of the crossing.

=== Artwork ===
The project includes several pieces of public art. During construction, artworks by local artists were placed on the jump forms within which the bridge towers were built. The art on the Canadian bridge tower was undertaken by artists from Walpole Island First Nation and Caldwell First Nation, with the art on the American bridge tower undertaken by Roberto Villalobos, an artist from Southwest Detroit. Following removal, the murals were subsequently donated to organisations and municipalities on both sides of the river.

On the outside of a maintenance building, Canadian artist Sara Graham designed On the Other Side of Tomorrow, with cast concrete patterns that represent natural and urban features. Aazhoge, a 3-metre-high (9.8 ft) sculpture of tree bark by Anishinaabe artist Michael Belmore recognizes and celebrates First Nations, visible as traffic enters and leaves the Canadian Port of Entry. Make A Joyful Noise, a 3-metre-high (9.8 ft) sculpture that commemorates the Underground Railroad is visible to users of the multi-use path as they enter and exit Canada. Artist Jordan Sook was chosen from a selection of Canadian artists from the Black, African and Caribbean diaspora. The architectural lighting for the bridge (titled Shimmer) was designed by Canadian artist Douglas Coupland.

== Connections ==
=== Highway 401 (Rt. Hon. Herb Gray Parkway) ===
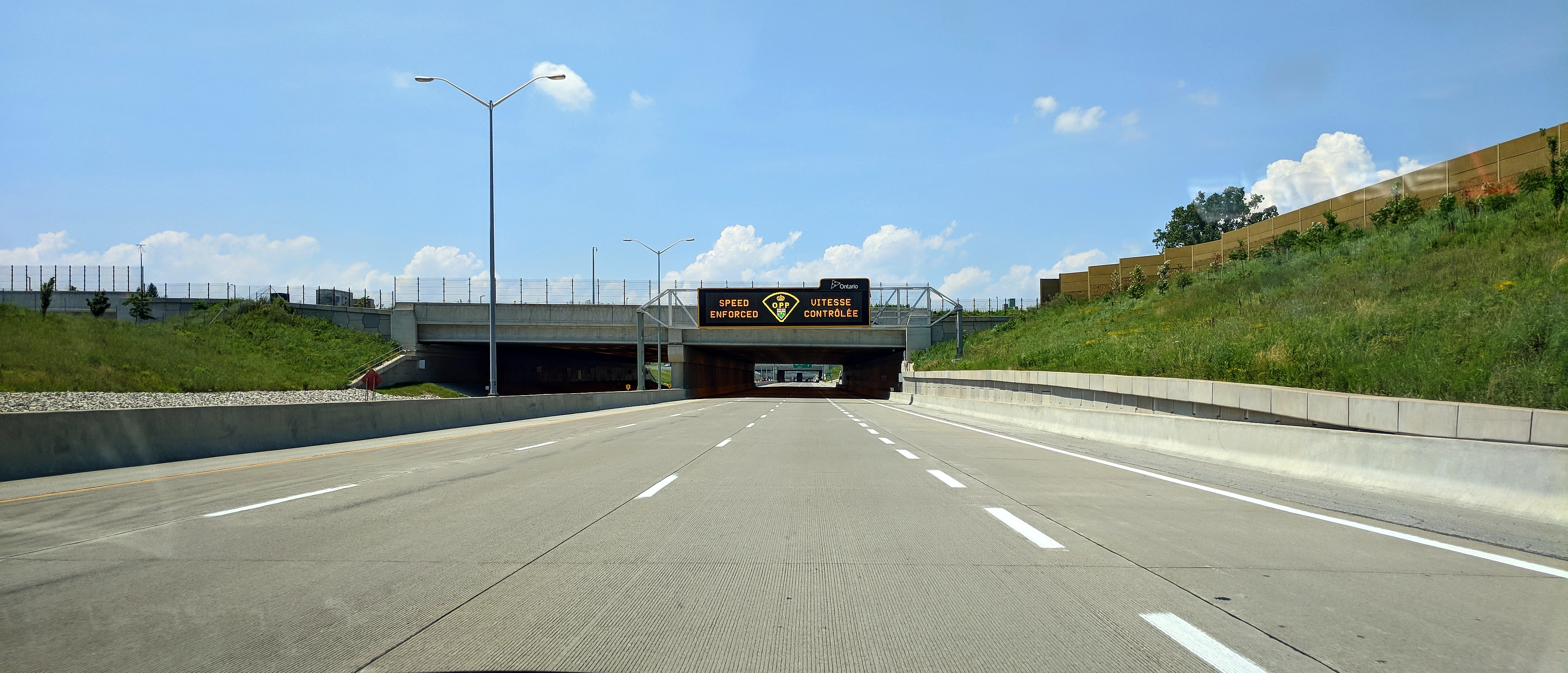
The extension of Highway 401 in Windsor to the bridge opened in 2015, as the Rt. Hon. Herb Gray Parkway.

In Canada, the bridge constitutes the new western terminus of Ontario Highway 401. Until 2015, Highway 401 ended on the outskirts of Windsor at Highway 3 (Talbot Road). The bridge will connect to an extension of Highway 401, locally named the Rt. Hon. Herb Gray Parkway, on its east side. The parkway is below-grade and has six through-lanes. The parkway follows (but does not replace) Highway 3 (Talbot Road and Huron Church Road) from a new interchange at the former end of Highway 401 to the E. C. Row Expressway, where it runs concurrently westward for 2 kilometres (1.2 mi). From there, it turns northwest and follows a new alignment to the border. The parkway also features 300 acres (1.2 km^{2}) of green space and over 20 kilometres (12 mi) of recreational trails, with seven bridges and two tunnels separating the trails from roads. Full construction of the parkway began in 2011, and was completed in November 2015 at a cost of CA$1.4 billion.

Construction of the Rt. Hon. Herb Gray Parkway that links to the bridge on the Canadian side was hampered by concerns it could affect Ontario's last known habitat of Butler's garter snakes. During the construction process, biologists relocated the snakes (including eastern fox snakes, and the garters—of which there were a larger number than originally thought), with their new habitats protected by a specially designed above and below-ground fencing system along affected portions of the E. C. Row Expressway.

=== Interstate 75 ===
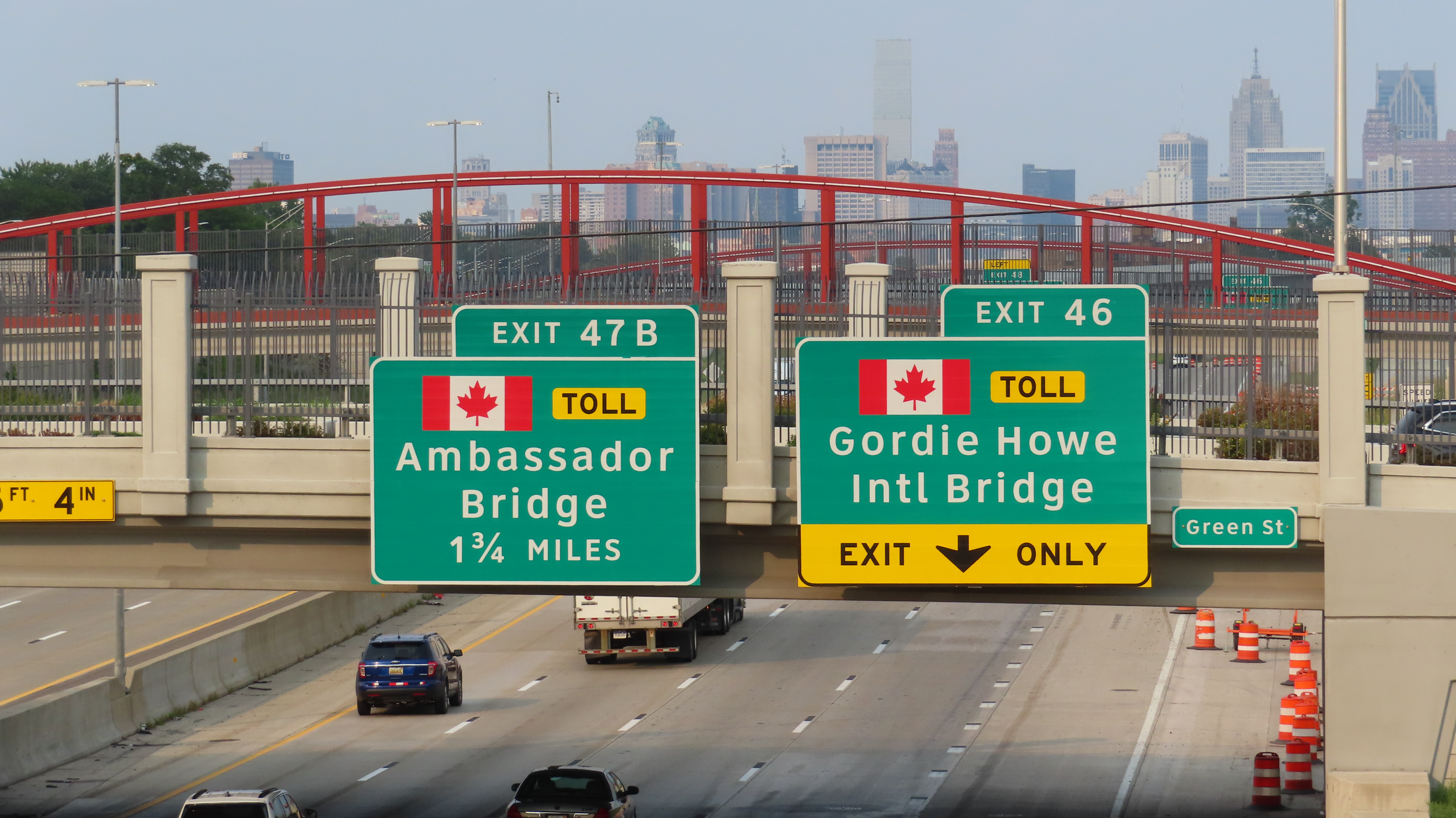
Signs pointing to the Gordie Howe and Ambassador bridges on northbound Interstate 75

In the United States, the existing routing of Interstate 75 remains unchanged (in contrast to the Canadian side where the bridge serves as the new terminus of an extended Highway 401). However, a connecting road was constructed from the bridge to a semi-directional T interchange with access ramps to both directions of Interstate 75. Along with this new interchange, 1.9 miles (3 km) of Interstate 75 was rebuilt and widened, local roads were improved and new pedestrian bridges added. Noise walls were also built to mitigate impacts to the Southwest Detroit neighbourhood.

=== Walking and biking ===
In March 2017, WDBA announced that the design requirements for the Gordie Howe International Bridge Project would include a dedicated multi-use path that would accommodate pedestrians and cyclists and be free of tolls. The path opened to foot and cycle traffic on 5 August 2026. It connects to local streets and trails on both of its sides. The bridge forms part of the Trans Canada Trail, linking trail networks on both sides of the river including the Canadian Great Lakes Waterfront Trail, as well as the American Iron Belle Trail and the Great Lakes Way. The bridge includes dedicated customs processing areas for pedestrians and cyclists on both ends, separated from border vehicle traffic.

== Community benefits ==
Alongside the construction of the bridge, US$20 million was allocated to various community benefit projects in both the United States and Canada. Projects included support for local community groups, improvements to local parks and trails, and improvements to local streets. Grants were also awarded for home improvements in Delray, and to Walpole Island First Nation.

Contractors were also encouraged to employ residents of Detroit and Windsor, and the wider Metro Detroit and Essex County areas, alongside work to provide apprenticeships and training to workers.

== Opposition ==
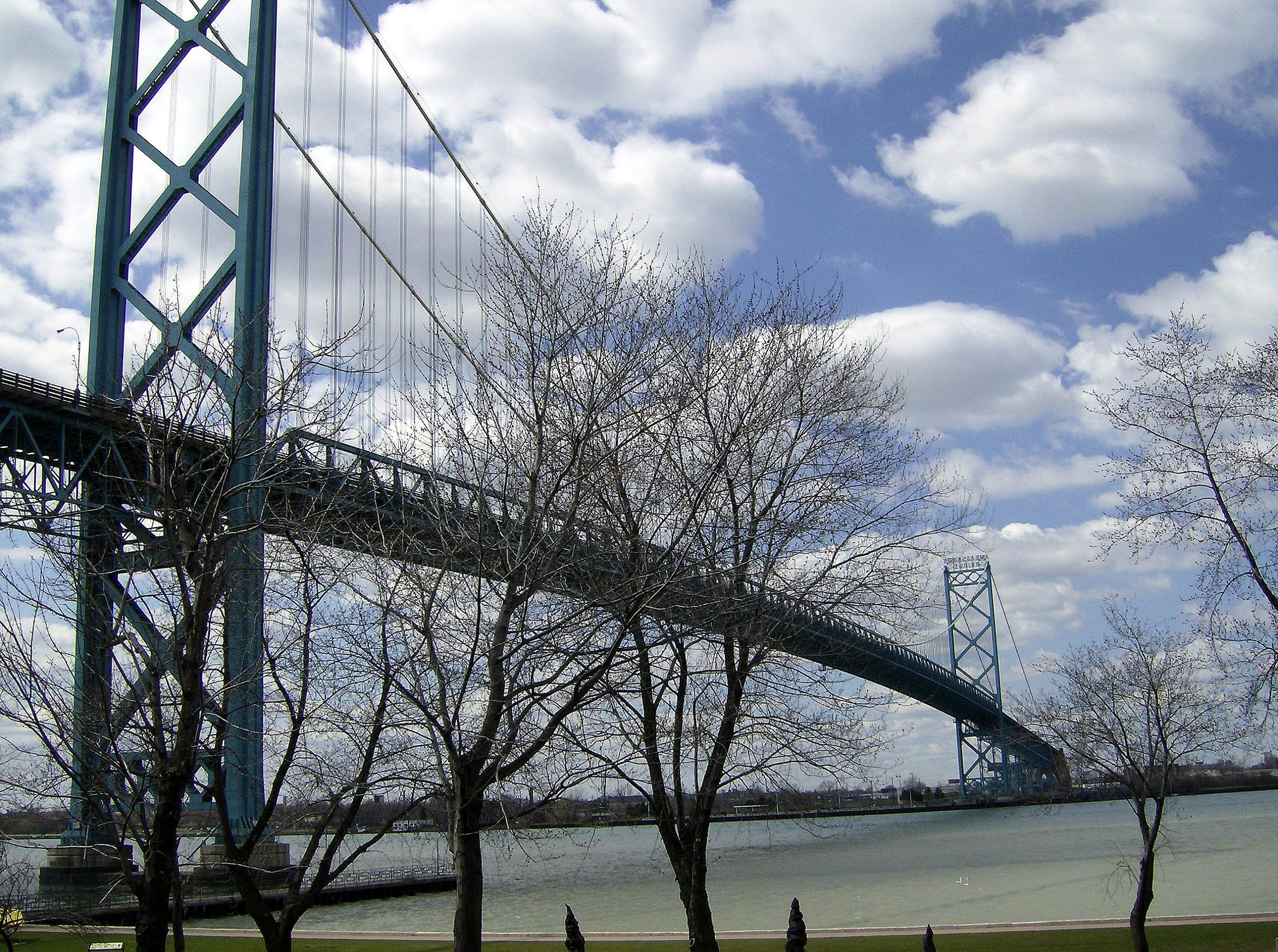
Ambassador Bridge (opened in 1929), owned by the Moroun family

Vocal opposition to the new crossing came from American billionaire Manuel "Matty" Moroun (1927–2020), owner of the nearby Ambassador Bridge. He sued the governments of Canada and Michigan to stop its construction, and released a proposal to build a second span of the Ambassador Bridge (which he would have owned) instead. Critics suggest that Moroun's opposition was fuelled by the prospect of lost profits from duty-free gasoline sales, which are exempt from about 60 cents per gallon in taxes even though the pump price to consumers is only a few cents lower.

In early June 2011, the conservative advocacy group Americans for Prosperity posted bogus eviction notices on homes in Detroit's Delray district. With the words "Eviction Notice" in large type, the notices told homeowners their properties could be taken by the Michigan Department of Transportation to make way for the proposed new bridge. The group's state director said the fake notices were intended to get residents to contact state lawmakers, to ask them to vote against the bridge project. Americans for Prosperity charged that the project would be a waste of taxpayer money if toll revenues did not cover debt service.

In July 2011, the Canadian Transit Company, the Canadian side of Moroun ownership of the Ambassador Bridge, began running advertisements against the DRIC proposal, calling it a "$2.2 billion road to nowhere". The phone number listed for Canadian Transit Company forwarded to a phone number in Michigan, and the Canadian Transit Company previously held its 2011 annual meeting at the offices of the Detroit International Bridge Company. MPP Dwight Duncan advised that he was investigating whether or not the ads violated Ontario's election laws, which disallow public spending by foreign lobbyists.

In 2012, Moroun spent more than US$30 million promoting a proposed amendment to the Michigan Constitution that, had it passed, would have required approval of both the voters of Detroit and the voters of Michigan in statewide elections to build the bridge. NPR affiliate network Michigan Public aired a story on November 2, four days before the vote, which indicated the amendment's "seemingly neutral language masks a very specific—and bitter—political battle". The ballot proposal was defeated by a 60 percent to 40 percent margin, paving the way for the project to proceed.

In the 2010s, Moroun undertook several lawsuits alleging that the 2013 crossing agreement was illegal (and should not have been approved by the US State Department), as well as alleging that they had exclusive rights to a span connecting Detroit to Windsor. In 2015, the Supreme Court of the United States declined to hear a challenge by Moroun regarding the choice of location for the bridge. In June 2016, the last of these lawsuits by Moroun was dismissed, allowing the project to continue.

In 2018, the company aired television ads on Fox & Friends asking Trump to cancel the project. Instead, in December 2019, Trump signed the first US funding, allocating up to $15 million, for customs and border protection for the bridge into law. In May 2018, the Michigan Court of Appeals ruled against Moroun's attempt to stop expropriations on the Michigan side of the river, allowing construction of the bridge to begin. Further efforts by Moroun to prevent construction were denied in June 2020.

In July 2020, Matty Moroun died aged 93, with his family maintaining their ownership of the Ambassador Bridge. In 2022, the Detroit Free Press reported that Moroun's family were preparing a case for damages, following the acquisition of properties by eminent domain for bridge construction.

== Naming ==
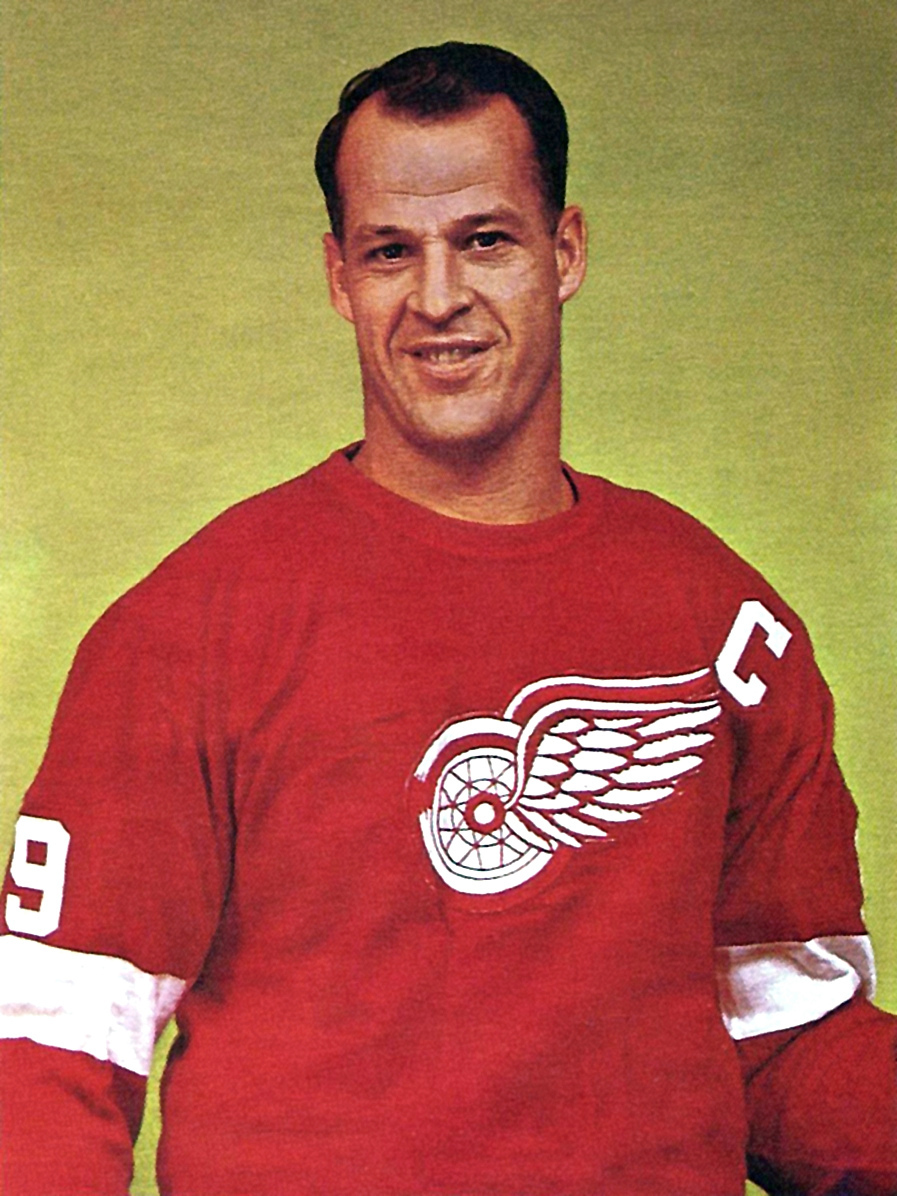
Gordie Howe with the Detroit Red Wings in the 1960s

Snyder stated that he had "not [been] crazy" about naming the bridge the Detroit River International Crossing, noting that "DRIC" was intended only to be the name of the commission sponsoring the bridge, and not the bridge itself. Concerns were also acknowledged that the abbreviated name was too close to that of the Detroit International Bridge Company (DIBC)—that would be too sensitive given its objections to the project. Sometime afterward, the working name for the project became the New International Trade Crossing (NITC), garnering the endorsement of 139 organizations and individuals. It was under the NITC name that the project was approved by the U.S. State Department on April 12, 2013.

In late 2010, David Bradley, president of the Ontario Trucking Association, proposed naming the bridge in honour of Canadian professional ice hockey player Gordie Howe, who played the bulk of his career for the Detroit Red Wings. The naming was supported by a number of Canadian politicians, along with Howe's son Marty—who felt the name would have been symbolic of him having come from Canada to spend the bulk of his NHL career in Detroit.

On May 14, 2015, during an event attended by Canadian Prime Minister Stephen Harper, it was officially announced that the bridge would be known as the Gordie Howe International Bridge. Howe, 87 and in ailing health, did not attend the ceremony. Later, when asked by his son what he thought about the naming, Howe remarked "That sounds pretty good to me." Howe died one year later on June 10, 2016, two years before construction began.

== See also ==
- Blue Water Bridge – Connects Port Huron, Michigan, to Sarnia, Ontario
- Detroit–Windsor Tunnel – A car-van-bus link between the two cities
- Infrastructure policy of Donald Trump
- List of bridges in Canada
- List of international bridges in North America
