= Manuel Moroun =

American businessman (1927–2020)

- Born: June 5, 1927; Detroit, Michigan, U.S.
- Died: July 12, 2020 (aged 93); Grosse Pointe Shores, Michigan, U.S.
- Other name: Matty Moroun
- Education: University of Notre Dame
- Occupations: Chairman and CEO of CenTra Inc.
- Known for: Owner of the Ambassador Bridge
- Spouse: Nora Moroun
- Children: Matthew T. Moroun

Manuel "Matty" Moroun (June 5, 1927 – July 12, 2020) was an American billionaire businessman, most notable as the owner of the Ambassador Bridge international crossing connecting Detroit, Michigan, and Windsor, Ontario. The bridge, which Moroun purchased from the Bower family in 1979, is one of the few privately owned border crossings between the United States and Canada.

His company CenTra, Inc. is the controlling body of Central Transport International, an LTL trucking carrier. Moroun also had a controlling stake in Universal Truckload Services Inc., which is a holding company for several over-the-road truck lines and logistics companies (Universal Am-Can Ltd., Mason Dixon Lines, Economy Transport, Cavalry Logistics, Louisiana Transportation, Inc., etc.). Moroun was formerly owner of the Roosevelt Warehouse and of Michigan Central Station. A 2008 Forbes article listed Matty Moroun as the 321st-richest American.

== Early life ==
Manuel Moroun (Arabic: مانويل مارون) was born in 1927 in Detroit to Syrian Maronite Christian parents Tufick (Arabic: توفيق مورون) and Jamal Moroun (Arabic: جمال مورون) His grandfather first moved from South America to Windsor, Ontario. According to Moroun, the family moved across the river to Detroit when the Ambassador Bridge company purchased and demolished his grandfather's Windsor home for its new bridge.

Moroun grew up on the city's east side with three sisters. His father ran two gas stations in Detroit, where Moroun worked before and during high school, which he completed at the University of Detroit Jesuit High School. He later claimed that Jimmy Hoffa was one of the customers for whom he had pumped gas.

In 1946, his father bought Central Cartage Company, which would later become Central Transport, and Moroun started working with him. During college, Moroun regularly commuted between the University of Notre Dame in South Bend, Indiana, and Detroit, to help run the family business. He graduated in 1949 with a bachelor's degree in chemistry and biology. He aspired to become a doctor, but ultimately went back to Detroit to work at the family's service station. He also cleaned and serviced buses for a living. By the middle of the 1950s, Moroun was responsible for managing most of his family's trucking business.

== Bridge ownership ==
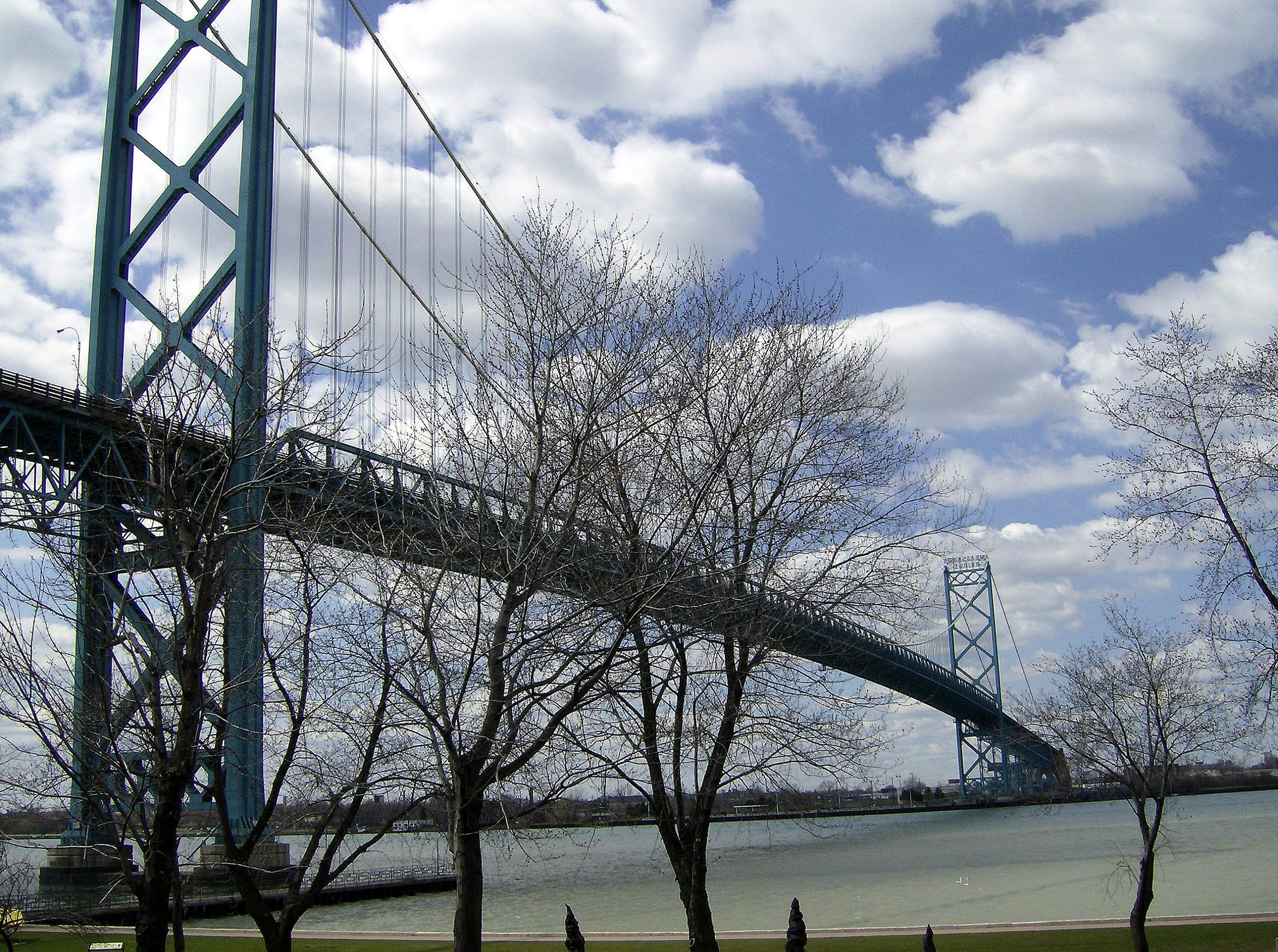
Ambassador Bridge from Windsor, Ontario, looking towards Detroit, Michigan

Moroun bought the Ambassador Bridge in 1979 when shares came on the market. It had originally been privately built by railroad interests. The bridge was estimated in 2010 to be worth between $1.5 and $3 billion.

In 2009, the Michigan Department of Transportation (MDOT) sued Moroun and the Detroit International Bridge Company for failing to comply with the terms of a contract to construct ramps connecting the Ambassador Bridge to nearby I-75 and I-96 freeways as part of the Gateway Project. In February 2010, Wayne County Circuit Judge Prentis Edwards ruled that Moroun and the chief deputy of the Detroit International Bridge Co., Dan Stamper, were in violation of the contract, and ordered them to come into compliance. On January 12, 2012, Judge Edwards found both Moroun and Stamper to be in non-compliance with his previous order, and ordered both men to jail, denying a motion to stay the order until it could be appealed to the Michigan Court of Appeals. After spending a night in jail, both men were released by the appellate court while they heard the case.

According to the Detroit Metro Times, Moroun "spent years and millions of dollars fighting [a] new U.S.-Canada crossing" to maintain this bridge monopoly. This included spending $33 million to fund a 2012 Michigan state ballot proposal to prevent a new bridge.

The United States and Canadian governments agreed to build the Gordie Howe International Bridge, a bridge between Detroit and Windsor to be located downriver. As a result of Moroun's lobbying against funding for the construction, the construction was agreed to be funded entirely by the Canadian government, with revenues from tolls from the Gordie Howe bridge granted to Canada until after construction costs are recovered (after which they will be shared with Michigan). Moroun contrasts this to the tolls collected on the Ambassador Bridge, which are subject to United States taxes and given to Detroit. Critics suggested that Moroun's opposition was fueled by the prospect of lost profits from duty-free gasoline sales at the bridge.

Ed Arditti, of the online news site Windsor Square, suggested the appointment of Mark R. McQueen to the new Windsor-Detroit Bridge Authority was intended to anger the Moroun family. McQueen had been the executive assistant to Hugh Segal, Prime Minister Brian Mulroney's chief of staff, when the Mulroney government had a dispute with Moroun.

== Michigan Central Station ==
Moroun owned Michigan Central Station from 1995 until 2018, when it was then sold to the Ford Motor Company. Moroun and his family had faced criticism for failing to invest in the property over its years of ownership, leading to a significant amount of decay within the property, and generally contributing to the "urban blight" characteristic that has enshrouded Detroit for much of the latter part of the 20th century through the early 21st century. On June 11, 2018, Matthew Mourun confirmed the transfer of possession and sale of the station and the warehouse to the Ford Motor Company.

== Personal life ==
Moroun married his wife, Nora, when he was 44 years old. Together, they had one child, Matthew, who went on to manage the family business after Moroun retired. The family resided in Grosse Pointe Shores, Michigan.

One of Moroun's sisters, Agnes, was in charge of the human resources department at CenTra Inc. His other two sisters, Victoria Baks and Florence McBrien, sued him for $53 million in 1992. They alleged that he had "cheated them out of their inheritance" following their father's death that same year, in addition to engaging in shareholder oppression, and excluding them from the business. The seven-year legal battle concluded in October 1999, with a settlement that saw Moroun purchase the shares of his two sisters in CenTra Inc.

Moroun died of congestive heart failure at his home in Grosse Pointe Shores on July 12, 2020.
