= Ambassador Bridge =

Suspension bridge connecting Detroit, Michigan, with Windsor, Ontario

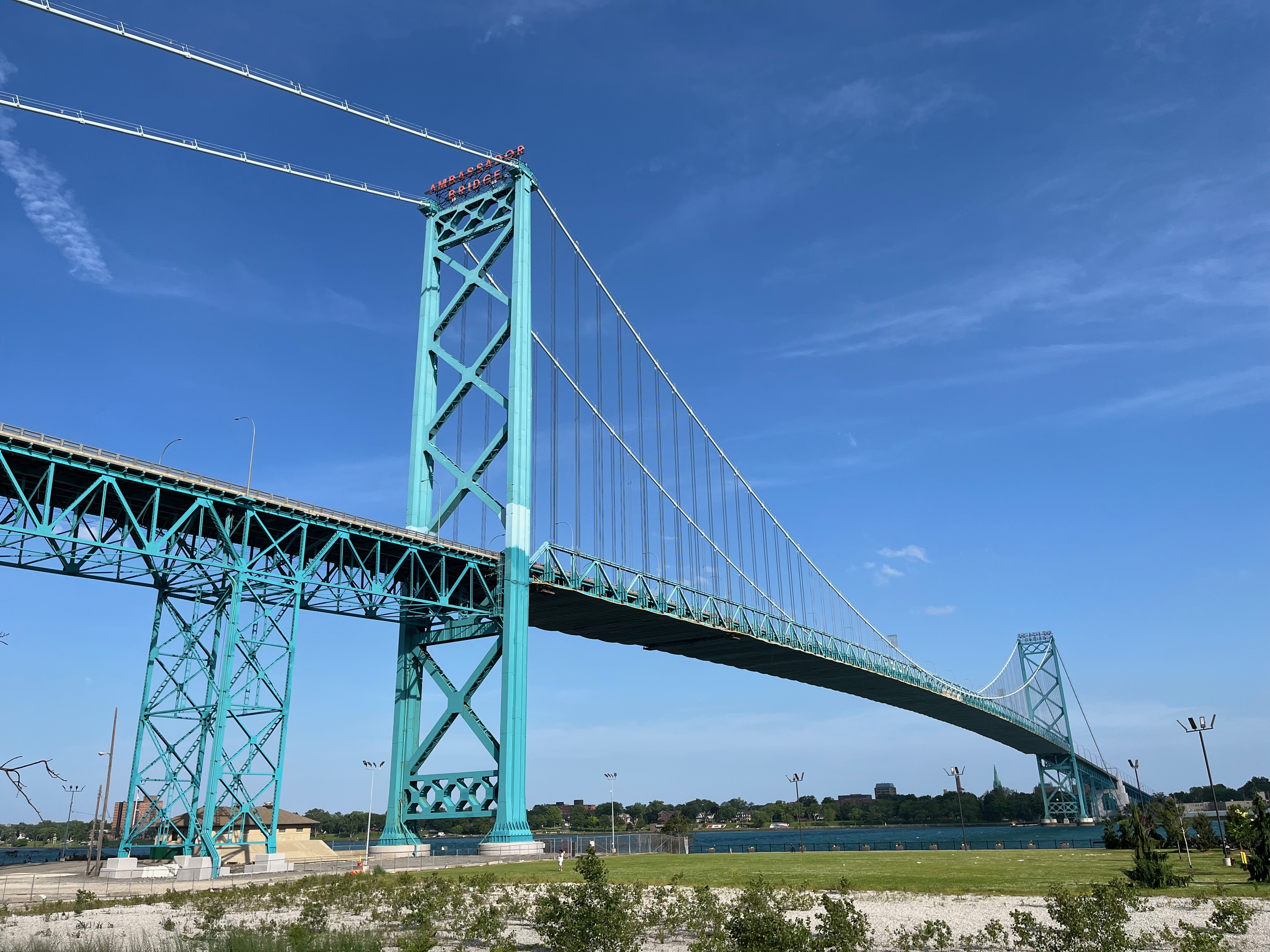
- View from Detroit's Riverside Park towards Windsor, Ontario, 2025
- Coordinates: 42.312°N 83.074°W
- Carries: 4 lanes of LECT connecting Highway 3 in Canada to I-75 / I-96 in the United States
- Crosses: Detroit River, Canada–United States border
- Locale: Detroit–Windsor
- Official name: Ambassador International Bridge
- Maintained by: Detroit International Bridge Company and Canadian Transit Company

Characteristics
- Design: Suspension bridge with truss bridge approaches
- Total length: 7,500 feet (2,300 m)
- Width: 47 feet (14 m)
- Height: 386 feet (118 m)
- Longest span: 1,850 feet (560 m)
- Clearance below: 152 feet (46 m)

History
- Constructed by: McClintic-Marshall Company
- Construction start: August 16, 1927
- Construction end: November 6, 1929
- Opened: November 15, 1929 (96 years ago)

Statistics
- Daily traffic: 10,000+ trucks per day, 4,000+ autos per day
- Toll: US$10.00/CA$14.00 (2026)

Location
- Interactive map of Ambassador Bridge

The Ambassador Bridge is an international suspension bridge across the Detroit River that connects Detroit, Michigan, United States, with Windsor, Ontario, Canada. Opened in 1929, the privately owned toll bridge was for decades the busiest international border crossing in North America in terms of trade volume, carrying more than 25% of all merchandise trade between the United States and Canada by value.

The bridge is one of the few privately owned US–Canada crossings; it was owned by Grosse Pointe billionaire Manuel "Matty" Moroun, until his death in July 2020, through the Detroit International Bridge Company in the United States and the Canadian Transit Company in Canada. In 1979, when the previous owners put it on the New York Stock Exchange and shares were traded, Moroun was able to buy shares, eventually acquiring the bridge. The bridge carries 60 to 70 percent of commercial truck traffic in the region. Moroun also owned the Ammex Detroit duty-free stores at both the bridge and the tunnel. The Moroun family had sought to stop the Gordie Howe International Bridge between Windsor and Detroit, arguing that it infringes on their alleged exclusive right to collect tolls. Moroun's son, Matthew, is the current owner.

== History ==
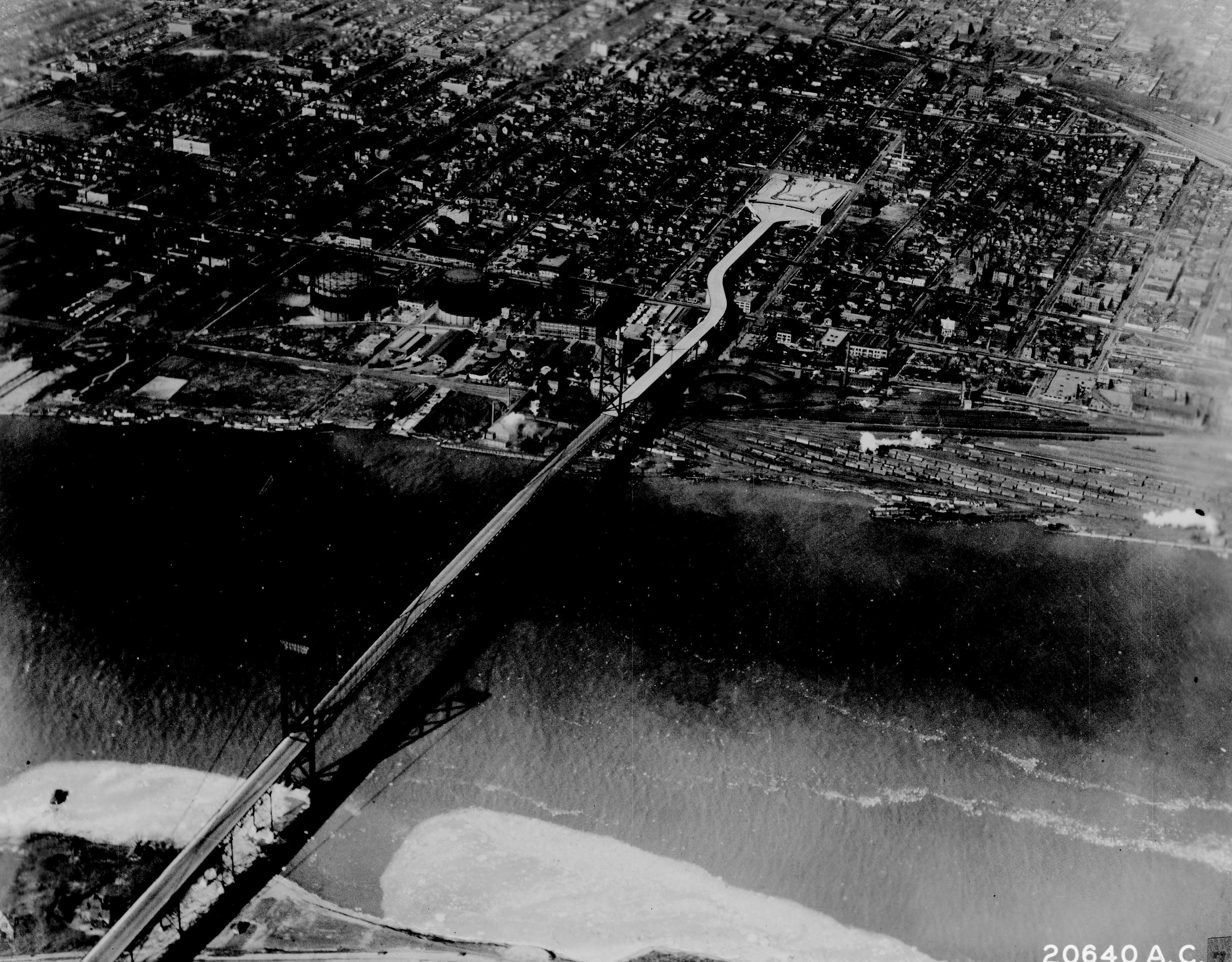
Aerial view of the bridge, 1941

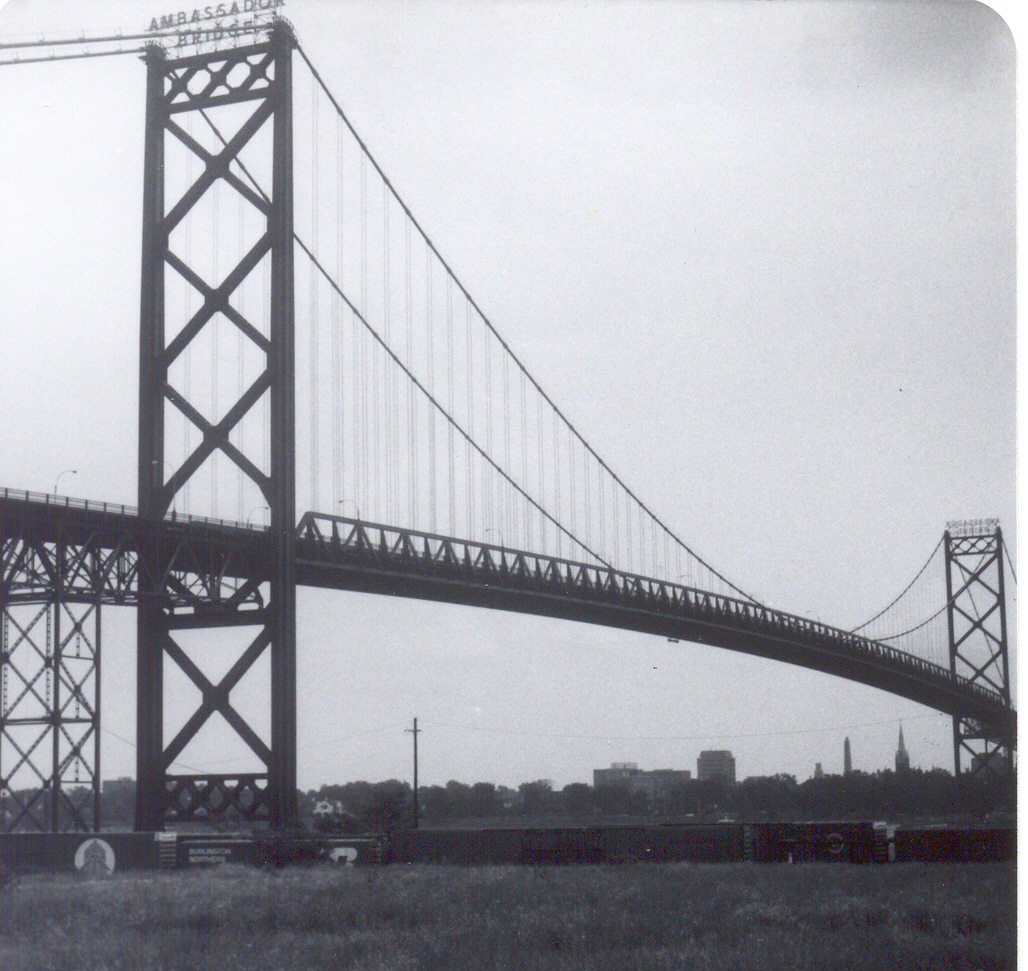
Ambassador Bridge in 1979

The passage across the Detroit River became an important traffic route following the American Civil War. The Michigan Central and the Great Western railroads in addition to others operated on either side of the border connecting Chicago with the Atlantic Seaboard. To cross the Detroit River, these railroads operated ferries between docks on either side. The ferries lacked the capacity to handle the shipping needs of the railroads, and there were often 700–1,000 freight cars waiting to cross the river, with numerous passengers delayed in transit. Warehouses in Chicago were forced to store grain that they could not ship to eastern markets and foreign goods were stored in eastern warehouses waiting shipment to the western United States. The net effect of these delays increased commodity prices in the country, and both merchants and farmers wanted a solution from the railroads.

The Michigan Central proposed the construction of a tunnel under the river with the support of their counterparts at the Great Western Railway. Construction started in 1871 and continued until ventilating equipment failed the next year; work was soon abandoned. Attention turned in 1873 to the alternative of building a railroad bridge over the river. The U.S. Army Corps of Engineers commissioned a study of a bridge over the Detroit River. Representatives of the shipping industry on the Great Lakes opposed any bridge with piers in the river as a hazard to navigation. Discussions continued for the remainder of the decade to no avail; a bridge over the Detroit River was not approved. The U.S. Congress requested a new study for a bridge in 1889, but no bridge was approved. Finally, the Michigan Central built the Detroit River Tunnel in 1909–10 to carry trains under the river. This tunnel benefited the Michigan Central and Great Western railroads, but the Canada Southern Railway and other lines still preferred a bridge over the river. Plans for a bridge were revived in 1919 to commemorate the end of World War I and to honor the "youth of Canada and the United States who served in the Great War".

However neither Ontario nor Michigan wanted to finance a river crossing. Michigan automakers subsequently decided to take the initiative to connect the Midwest to central Canada. After they created a bridge company, the project got into trouble when a Toronto financier hired to sell its securities instead embezzled the money and ran off, before ultimately dying from suicide in a prison cell after his conviction for murdering a drugstore clerk. The bridge boosters turned to New Yorker Joseph A. Bower, a businessman who specialized in rescuing mismanaged companies. Bower succeeded in raising the necessary initial $12 million. "The only way things can be done today, is by private business," said Henry Ford, who backed the project. The bridge was constructed with investment from Detroit business people incorporated as the Detroit International Bridge Corporation.

Much later Berkshire Hathaway acquired a quarter of the shares before selling to another investor in the company, local trucking entrepreneur Manuel Moroun. Moroun continued buying further, eventually privatizing it.

=== Incidents ===
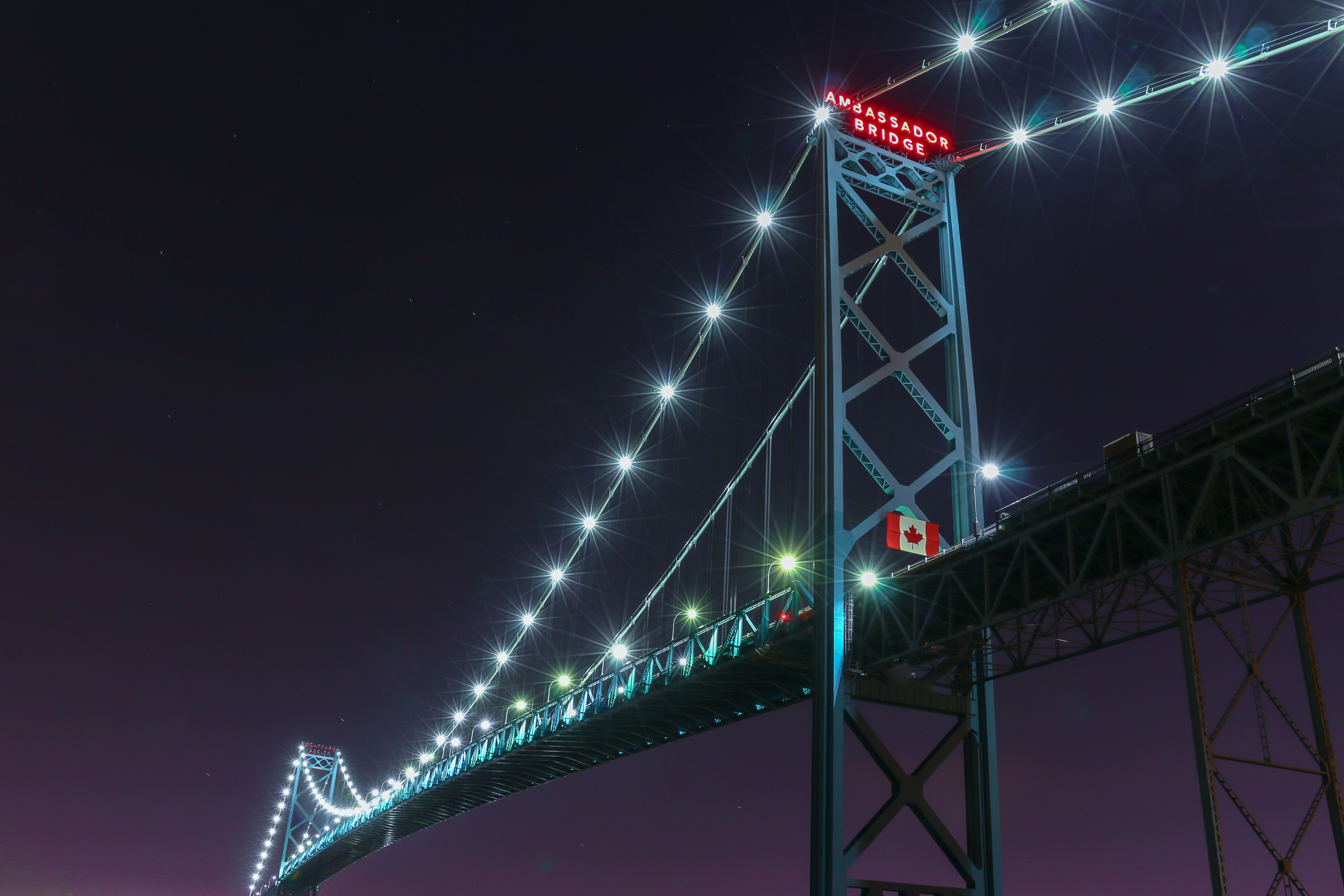
Ambassador Bridge at night, in 2014

In April 1930, shortly after the bridge opened, a Canadian immigration inspector jumped to his death. The bridge has been used by other suicide jumpers. High divers considered it as a venue for a record; after measurements of the height and currents were taken into account, they were dissuaded and abandoned the attempt.

On November 14, 2000, a scaffold collapsed, sending three workers into the Detroit River and leaving four others dangling from safety harnesses. Jamie Barker, one of those who fell, died. An engineer, George Snowden, was disciplined by Professional Engineers Ontario for his role in the collapse. In 2012, a design that Snowden approved caused the Radiohead stage collapse in Toronto. Snowden's associate Domenic Cugliari was also involved in both collapses.

In July 2023, Spencer Baker, another construction worker, fell from the scaffolding into the river; he was rescued with injuries. Access to the Ambassador Bridge was impeded by protesters during the Freedom Convoy protests in Canada. Protesters at the bridge blockaded it on February 7, 2022. On the evening of February 7, traffic at the bridge came to a complete halt. The blockade continued into February 8. On the morning of February 8, officials declared the bridge reopened, but the blockade later resumed, pushing trips to the Blue Water Bridge between Sarnia and Port Huron. (Note: Attributed to multiple sources.)

In 2025, it was reported that undocumented immigrants that had accidentally driven onto the bridge were being detained by U.S. Customs and Border Protection, with Michigan Immigrant Rights Centre stating that over 200 people had been detained "between January and March [2025]—90 per cent of whom had mistakenly taken the wrong exit". Michigan Immigrant Rights Center requested clearer signage to prevent drivers from accidentally trying to cross the border to Canada.

== Design ==
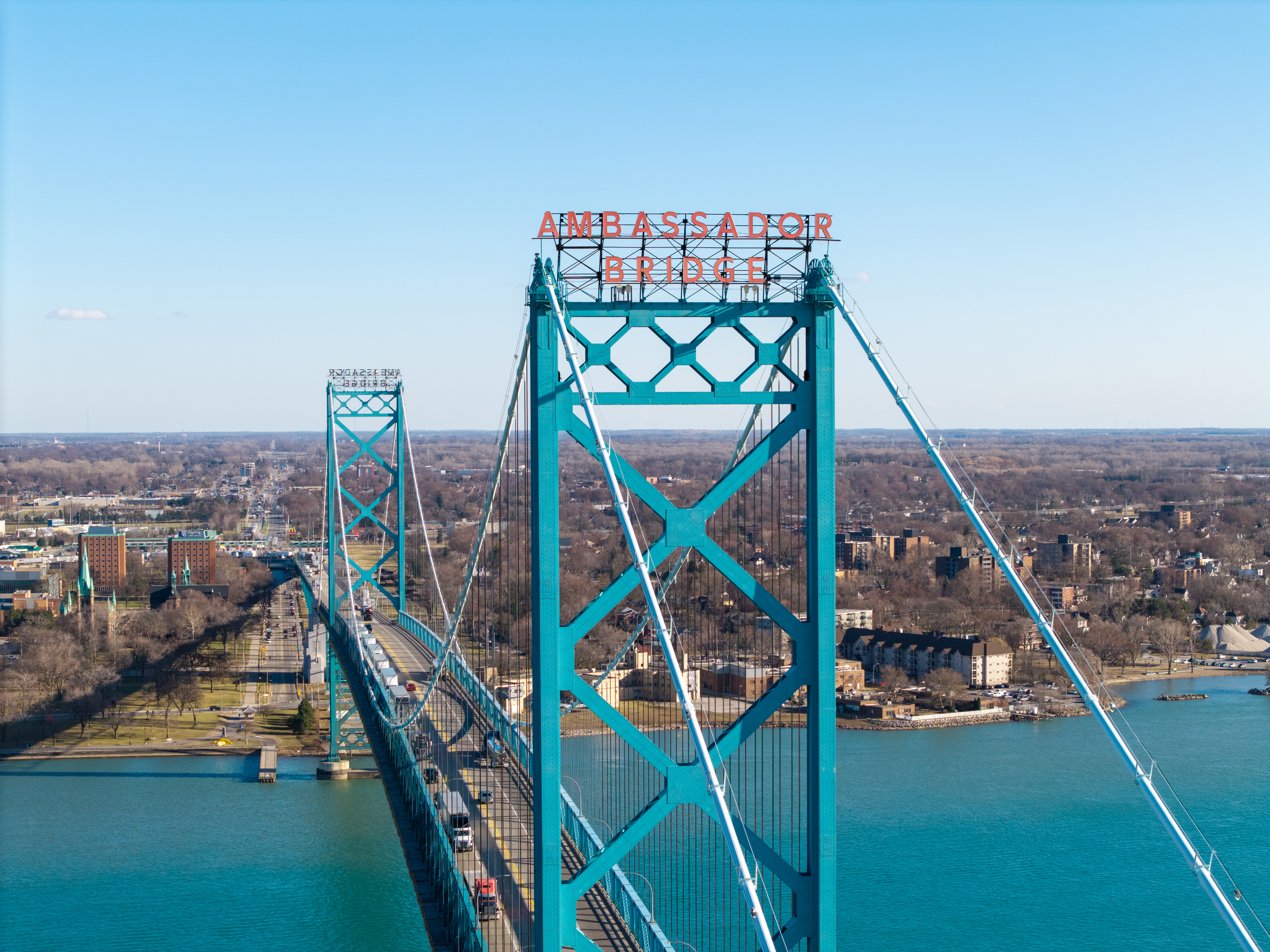
View of the bridge sign from Detroit with Windsor, Ontario in the background in 2025

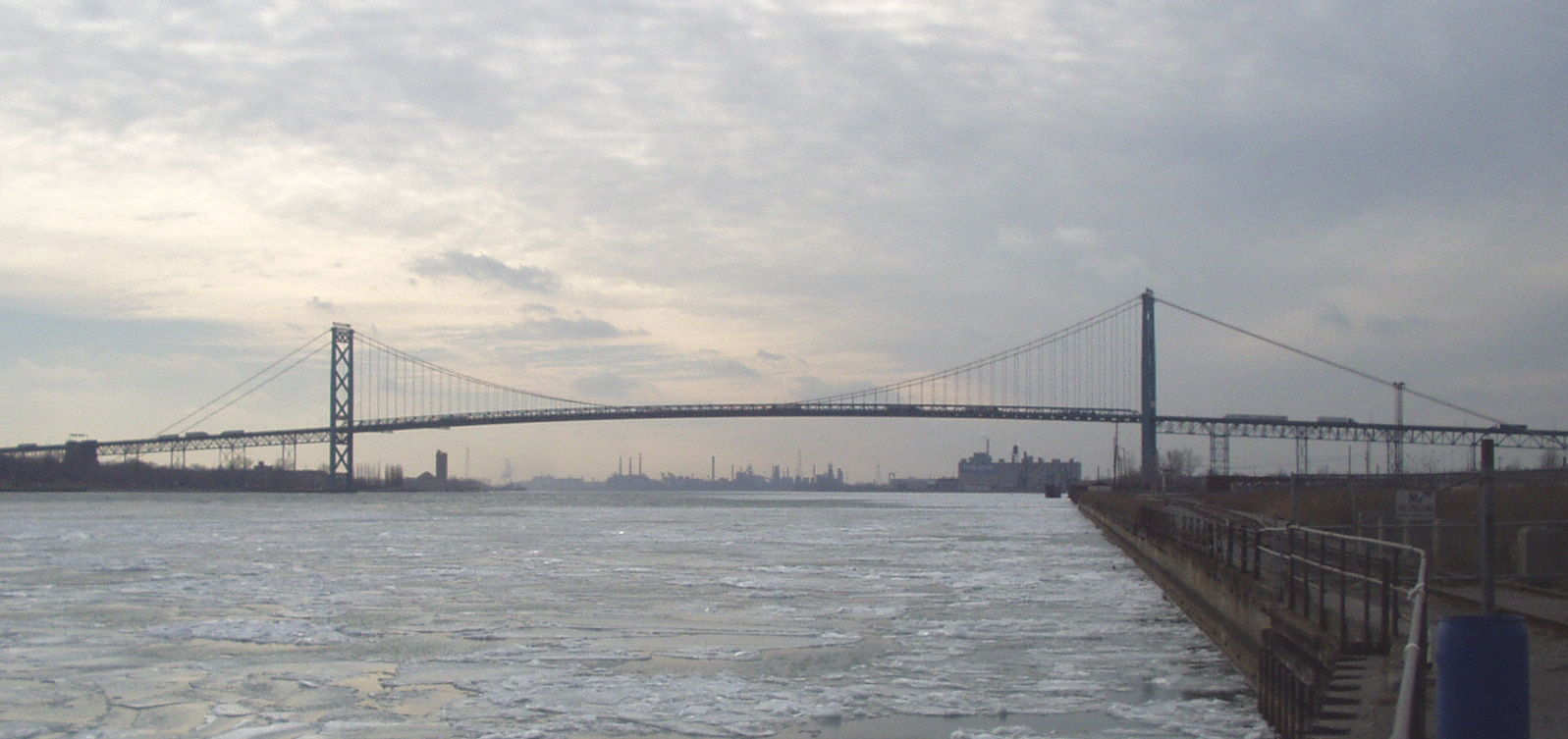
View of the bridge from the Detroit River, with Canada to the left

The bridge over the Detroit River had the longest suspended central span in the world when it was completed in 1929—1,850 feet (560 m). This record held until the George Washington Bridge between New York and New Jersey opened in 1931. The bridge's total length is 7,500 feet (2,286 m). Construction began in 1927 and was completed in 1929. The general contractor and steel erector was the McClintic-Marshall Company of Pittsburgh, Pennsylvania.

The bridge is made up of 21,000 short tons (19,000 tonnes) of steel, and the roadway rises as high as 152 feet (46 m) above the Detroit River. Only the main span over the river is supported by suspension cables; the approaches to the main pillars are held up by steel in a cantilever truss structure.

The bridge originally featured a sidewalk on the structure's southwest side. After the September 11 attacks, pedestrians and bicycles were prohibited from traveling across the bridge due to increased security measures. For years prior to September 11, 2001, the sidewalk was closed due to ongoing maintenance projects and repainting. The disused sidewalk was removed in 2013 as part of a deck replacement and lane widening project.

Originally painted gloss black, the bridge underwent a five-year refurbishment between 1995 and 2000, which included stripping and repainting the bridge teal. Each bridge tower is topped with a large red neon sign with the bridge's name, facing the land nearest to each tower.

Granite blocks, originally used on the U.S. side, were given to the Windsor Parks and Recreation Department, and now grace many of the pathways in Windsor parks.

=== Capacity ===
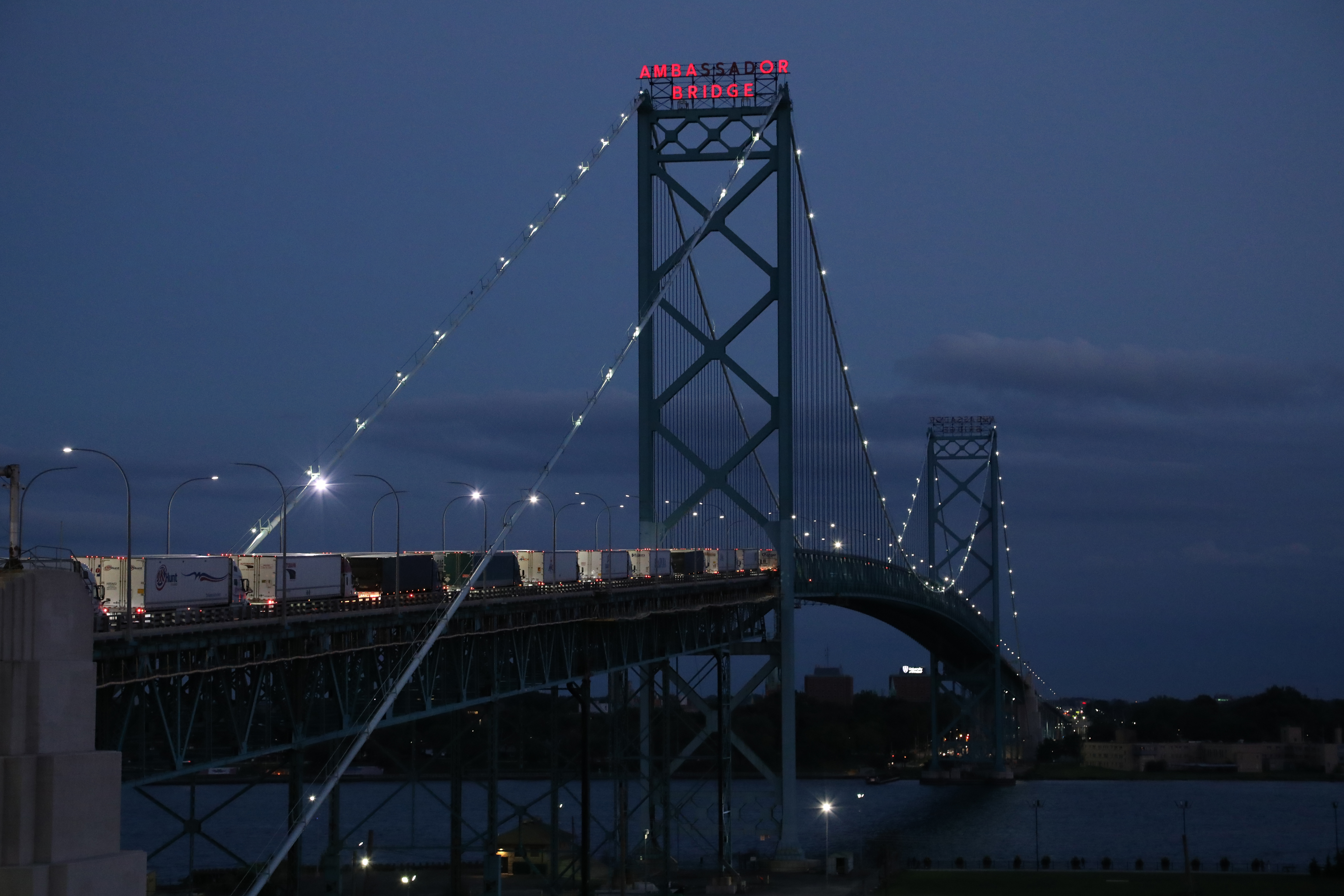
Trucks back up on Ambassador Bridge from the American side of the Detroit River, August 2022

Until the opening of the Gordie Howe International Bridge in 2026, the Ambassador Bridge was the busiest crossing on the Canada–United States border. The four-lane bridge carried more than 10,000 commercial vehicles on a typical weekday. The Gateway Project, a major redesign of the U.S. plaza completed in July 2009, provides direct access to Interstate 96 (I-96) and I-75 on the American side and Ontario Highway 3 on the Canadian side. The Canadian end of the bridge connects to busy city streets in west Windsor, leading to congestion.

Until 2026, the privately owned bridge carried approximately 25% of roadway trade between Canada and the United States.

Transport Canada reported the following distribution for the five largest U.S.–Canada border crossings by trucks in 2011:

1. 24.4% for Windsor-Ambassador Bridge
2. 14.4% for Sarnia–Blue Water Bridge, which links Port Huron, Michigan, with Point Edward, Ontario
3. 11.4% for Fort Erie–Peace Bridge, which connects Buffalo, New York, with Fort Erie, Ontario
4. 7.0% for Peace Arch Border Crossing, Pacific Highway/ Douglas, which links the U.S. State of Washington with British Columbia by land
5. 6.6% for Niagara Falls–Queenston Bridge, which links Lewiston, New York, with Queenston, Ontario.

In 2024, 2.3 million trucks passed over the Ambassador Bridge, a decline of 11.1% from the previous year, and the lowest traffic levels on record except for 2009 during the global financial crisis and 2020 amid the COVID-19 pandemic.

In the first month after the opening of the Gordie Howe International Bridge in 2026, traffic volumes dropped on the Ambassador Bridge by approximately 30%, with long-term effects to be determined.

== Additional bridge proposals ==
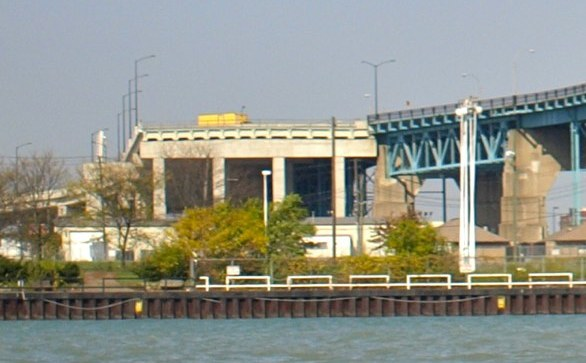
An approach that had been constructed for a proposed twin span to the Ambassador Bridge

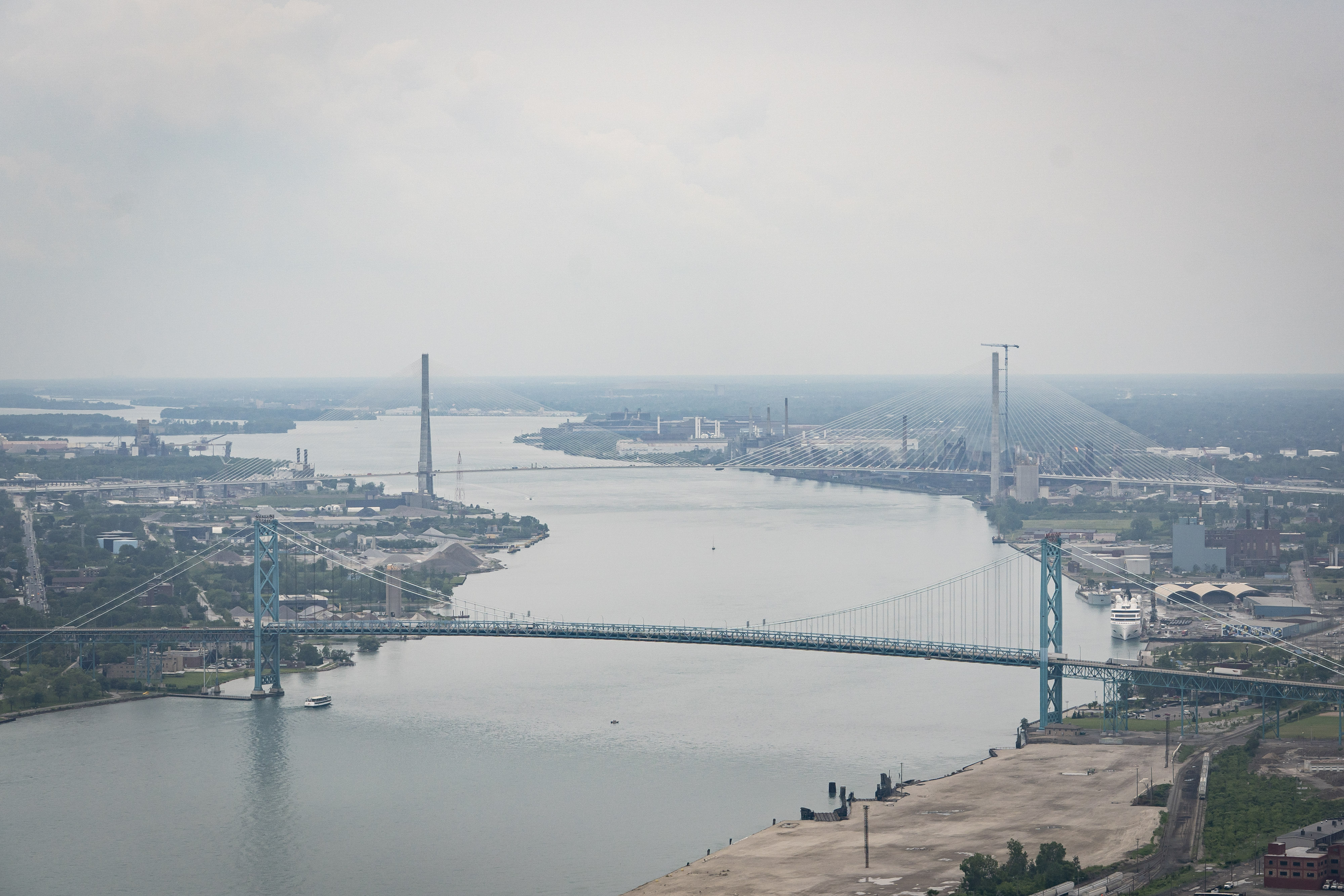
Ambassador Bridge with the Gordie Howe International Bridge in the background in June 2025

In summer 2009, the federal government of Canada reportedly offered to buy the Ambassador Bridge from Moroun for around $2 billion, but talks broke down when Moroun asked for $3 billion plus incentives.

In June 2012, the Canadian and United States governments approved the construction of the Gordie Howe International Bridge proposed by the Detroit River International Crossing (DRIC) commission. The new bridge further downriver between Detroit and Windsor will be owned and operated by the Windsor–Detroit Bridge Authority, a Crown corporation owned by the Canadian federal government.

Moroun spoke out against this proposal. He sued the governments of Canada and Michigan to stop its construction, and released a proposal to build a second span of the Ambassador Bridge (which he would own) instead. Critics suggest that Moroun's opposition was fueled by the prospect of lost profits from duty-free gasoline sales, which are exempt from about 60 cents per gallon in taxes even though the pump price to consumers is only a few cents lower. On May 5, 2011, a judge dismissed the case, citing a lack of reasoning for it to proceed. In September 2011, Matthew Moroun said that a public bridge "likely would put the Ambassador Bridge out of business."

Michigan and Canadian authorities continued to support the Gordie Howe International Bridge proposal, as it directly connects the Canadian E.C. Row Expressway and the 2015 extension of Ontario Highway 401 (which runs concurrently as a shared highway for 2 kilometres (1.2 mi) to the future crossing as the Windsor–Essex Parkway) with I-75 and I-96 in Michigan, bypasses Windsor's surface streets and reduces congestion. A twin span adjacent to the Ambassador Bridge, by itself, does not address Canadian concerns about traffic on Huron Church Road in Windsor. While many of the stop lights commonly cited have been removed by the expansion of Highway 401 (Herb Gray Parkway) which will connect to the Gordie Howe bridge downriver, the final approach to the Ambassador Bridge remains on overcrowded Windsor surface streets.

In 2007, the privately owned bridge company was granted a permit by the Michigan Department of Environmental Quality to build a new bridge across the Detroit River adjacent to the existing span, which expired in 2012. The U.S. Coast Guard issued the bridge company a permit in 2016 to construct the new span. As of 2021, construction cannot proceed until current bridge owner Matthew Moroun addresses a "conflict" with the bridge's permit issued for the Canadian side by Transport Canada in 2017. The Coast Guard permit was granted on the condition that the existing Ambassador Bridge would be retained and rehabilitated, while the Transport Canada permit was granted on the condition that the existing bridge would be dismantled and removed.

In 2022, the five year construction permit issued by Transport Canada expired. Transportation Minister Omar Alghabra noted that conversations between the federal government, the City of Windsor and the bridge company were "ongoing".

In 2025, the Windsor Star reported that the bridge company had "abandoned the idea" of a second span, with Windsor local councillor Fabio Costante stated that the bridge company are "no longer going to be doing the replacement span". They also reported that the bridge company planned to build a secondary truck inspection facility closer to the bridge.

== Legal issues and criticisms ==
The bridge's private ownership has been a concern as the bridge carries approximately 25% of trade between Canada and the United States. Although alternate routes exist, including the nearby Detroit–Windsor Tunnel, preventing monopoly status, the route is of significant value since it passes directly through major metropolitan areas. The aforementioned tunnel prohibits certain vehicles.

In 2010 and 2011, the Wayne County Circuit Court found the Detroit International Bridge Company in contempt for failing to directly connect bridge access roads to I-75 and I-96, and making other required improvements as part of the Gateway Project. These improvements would normally be under the control of the state government; however, the Detroit International Bridge Company withheld the improvements as part of a negotiation strategy. At one point, Matty Moroun and his chief deputy at the Detroit International Bridge Co, Dan Stamper, were jailed for non-compliance with orders to complete the on-ramps.

After years of legal battles, activism by local people against neighborhood truck traffic, and stalling by Matty Moroun, the Michigan Department of Transportation (MDOT) took over the I-75/I-96 on-ramp project and opened the ramps in September 2012 after a six-month construction period. One possible motive for the Gateway Project delays was Moroun's desire to route traffic past his lucrative duty-free store and fuel pumps, one of only two border locations to sell untaxed fuel (the other is International Falls, Minnesota). Critics of the duty-free fuel operation objected that sixty cents from each U.S. gallon went not to paving Michigan's underfunded highways but instead directly to Matty Moroun.

Operators of large trucks under the International Fuel Tax Agreement, which in theory should impose Ontario tax and partially refund Michigan tax on fuel purchased in Detroit and consumed on Ontario's Highway 401, may be disqualified for the Michigan IFTA refund, as the tax was never paid. In a 2012 lawsuit, the Michigan Department of Agriculture and Rural Development sued Moroun's company, Ammex, claiming it mislabeled motorcar fuels to advertise 93 octane while tests showed as little as 91.2 octane.

In 2015, Windsor city officials criticized the decaying appearance of the bridge and called attention to the hazard posed by crumbling concrete from its superstructure. In response, Matt Moroun accused the city of attempting to thwart the company's efforts to rebuild or repair the structure because the Canadian government is supporting plans for a new bridge across the Detroit River downriver.

== See also ==
- Blue Water Bridge, which links Port Huron, Michigan, to Sarnia, Ontario
- Sault Ste. Marie International Bridge, which links Sault Ste. Marie, Michigan, to Sault Ste. Marie, Ontario
- List of bridges in Canada
- List of international bridges in North America
