= Mayoral elections in Syracuse, New York =

Elections are held in Syracuse, New York, to choose the city's mayor. Currently, these elections are regularly scheduled to be held once every four years, with the elections taking place in the off-year immediately after United States presidential election years. The current mayor of Syracuse is Sharon Owens, who assumed office in 2026.

== 2009 ==
2009 Syracuse mayoral election
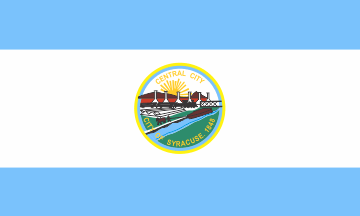
- November 3, 2009
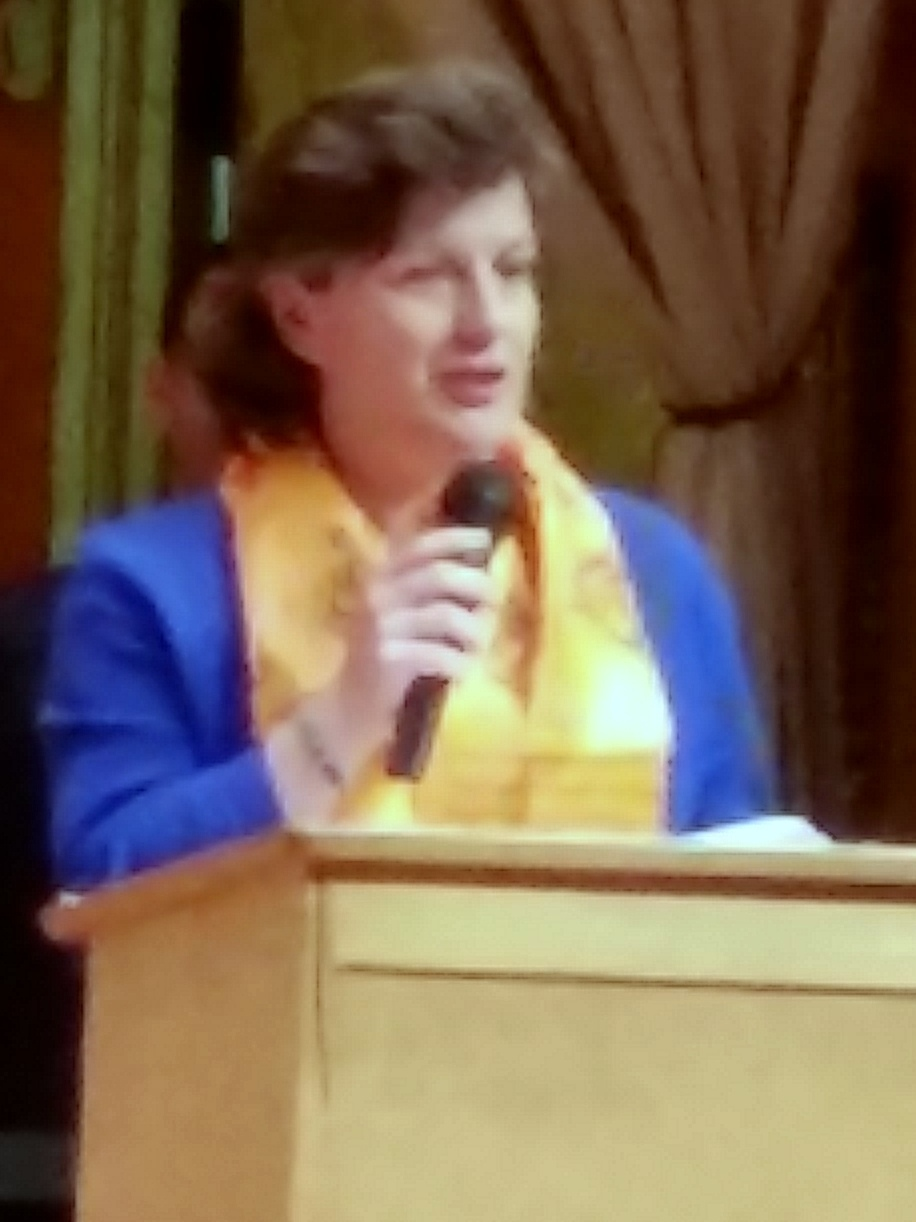

Candidate	Stephanie Miner	Steve Kimatian	Otis Jennings
Party	Democratic	Republican	Conservative
Popular vote	11,237	8,783	2,313
Percentage	50.3%	39.3%	10.4%
Mayor before election
Matt Driscoll
Democratic
Elected mayor
Stephanie Miner
Democratic

The 2009 Syracuse mayoral election was held on November 3, 2009. The incumbent mayor, Democrat Matt Driscoll, was term limited. Democrat Stephanie Miner defeated Republican Steve Kimatian, 50%-39%, and Conservative Party of New York candidate Otis Jennings finished a distant 3rd, with 10% of the vote. Miner became the city's first female leader.

=== Democratic primary ===
==== Candidates ====
- Alfonso Davis – Democratic political consultant
- Carmen Harlow – former Syracuse Department of Public Works deputy commissioner
- Stephanie Miner, Syracuse Common Councilor-at-Large
- Joe Nicoletti – business development consultant, former New York State Assemblyman and Syracuse Common Councilor

===== Withdrew =====
- Bethaida González, Syracuse Common Council President. Dropped out of race prior to primary.

==== Results ====
2009 Syracuse Democratic mayoral primary
Party	Candidate	Votes	%
Democratic	Stephanie Miner	4,040	44.4
Democratic	Joe Nicoletti	3,240	35.6
Democratic	Alfonso Davis	1,021	11.2
Democratic	Carmen Harlow	793	8.7
Majority		800	8.8
Turnout		9,094	100

=== Republican primary ===
==== Candidates ====
- Otis Jennings
- Steve Kimatian, former general counsel to Newport Television, former regional vice-president of Clear Channel Television, former television personality with Syracuse ABC-affiliate WSYR-TV

==== Results ====
Steve Kiatian defeated Otis Jennings. Jennings had carried the endorsement of the local Republican Party organization.

2009 Syracuse Republican mayoral primary
Party	Candidate	Votes	%
Republican	Steve Kimatian	1,645	56.4
Republican	Otis Jennings	1,271	43.5
Majority		374	12.9
Turnout		2,916	100

=== Conservative nomination ===
- Otis Jennings, after receiving an overwhelming endorsement from the Syracuse Republican Party, Jennings lost in the September primary for the Republican nomination. Days after the primary, he decided to continue campaigning, and received the nomination from the Conservative Party of New York.

=== General election ===
The general election took place on November 3, 2009.

2009 Syracuse mayoral election
Party	Candidate	Votes	%
Democratic	Stephanie Miner	10,904	46.3%
Working Families	Stephanie Miner	916	3.9%
Total	Stephanie Miner	11,820	50.2%
Republican	Steve Kimatian	7,860	33.4%
Independence	Steve Kimatian	1,377	5.8%
Total	Steve Kimatian	9,237	39.2%
Conservative	Otis Jennings	2,448	10.4%
	Write-ins	55	0.2%
Majority		2,583	11%
Turnout		23,560	100%

== 2013 ==
2013 Syracuse mayoral election
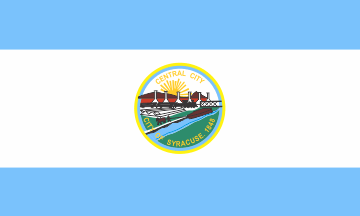
- November 5, 2013
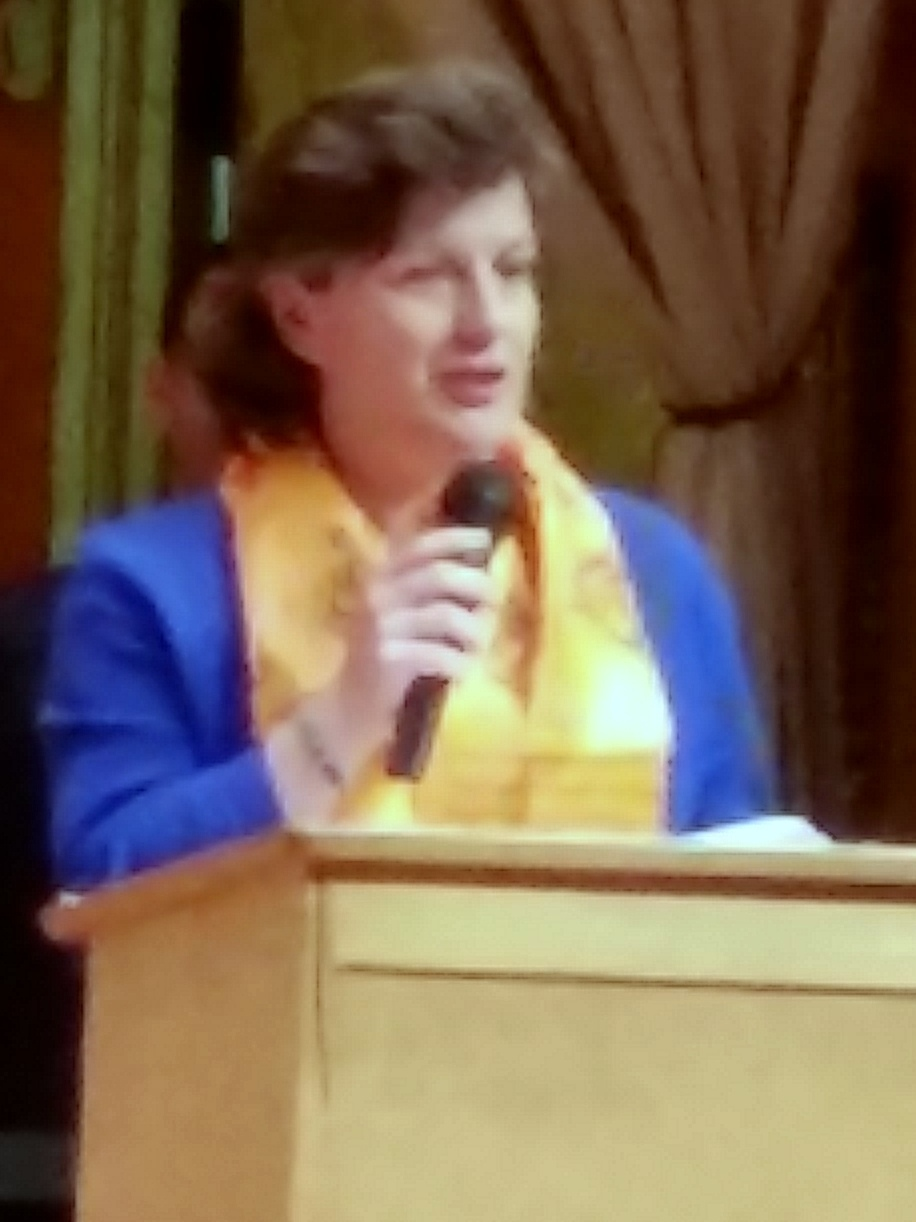

Candidate	Stephanie Miner	Ian Hunter	Kevin Bott
Party	Democratic	Conservative	Green
Popular vote	11,000	2,489	2,405
Percentage	68.13%	15.42%	14.90%
Mayor before election
Stephanie Miner
Democratic
Elected mayor
Stephanie Miner
Democratic

The 2013 Syracuse mayoral election was held on November 5, 2013, in Syracuse, New York. The incumbent mayor, Democrat Stephanie Miner, ran for re-election. She defeated Conservative candidate Ian Hunter and Green Party candidate Kevin Bott, winning 68% of the vote. The Republican Party did not field a candidate in this election, the first time in over a century that a Syracuse mayor ran unopposed by a major party candidate.

=== Democratic primary ===
==== Candidates ====
- Stephanie Miner – incumbent mayor
- Alfonso Davis – political consultant and candidate in the 2009 mayoral election
- Patrick Hogan – common councilor

==== Results ====
2013 Syracuse Democratic mayoral primary
Party	Candidate	Votes	%
Democratic	Stephanie Miner (incumbent)	3,860	54.04%
Democratic	Patrick Hogan	2,047	28.66%
Democratic	Alfonso Davis	1,221	17.09%
	Write-ins	15	0.21%
Majority		1,813	25.38%
Turnout		7,143	100%

=== Other nominations ===
==== Conservative ====
- Ian Hunter – project manager

Hunter collected signatures to run on the Republican line but was kept off of the ballot by the efforts of the Onondaga Republican Party chairman.

==== Green ====
- Kevin Bott – non-profit director

=== General election results ===
The general election took place on November 5, 2013.

2013 Syracuse mayoral election
Party	Candidate	Votes	%
Democratic	Stephanie Miner (incumbent)	9,805	60.73%
Independence	Stephanie Miner (incumbent)	617	3.82%
Working Families	Stephanie Miner (incumbent)	578	3.58%
Total	Stephanie Miner (incumbent)	11,000	68.13%
Conservative	Ian Hunter	2,489	15.42%
Green	Kevin Bott	2,405	14.90%
	Write-ins	252	1.56%
Majority		8,511	52.71%
Turnout		16,146	100%

== 2017 ==
2017 Syracuse mayoral election
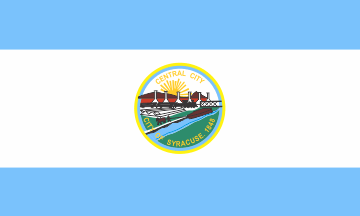
- November 7, 2017
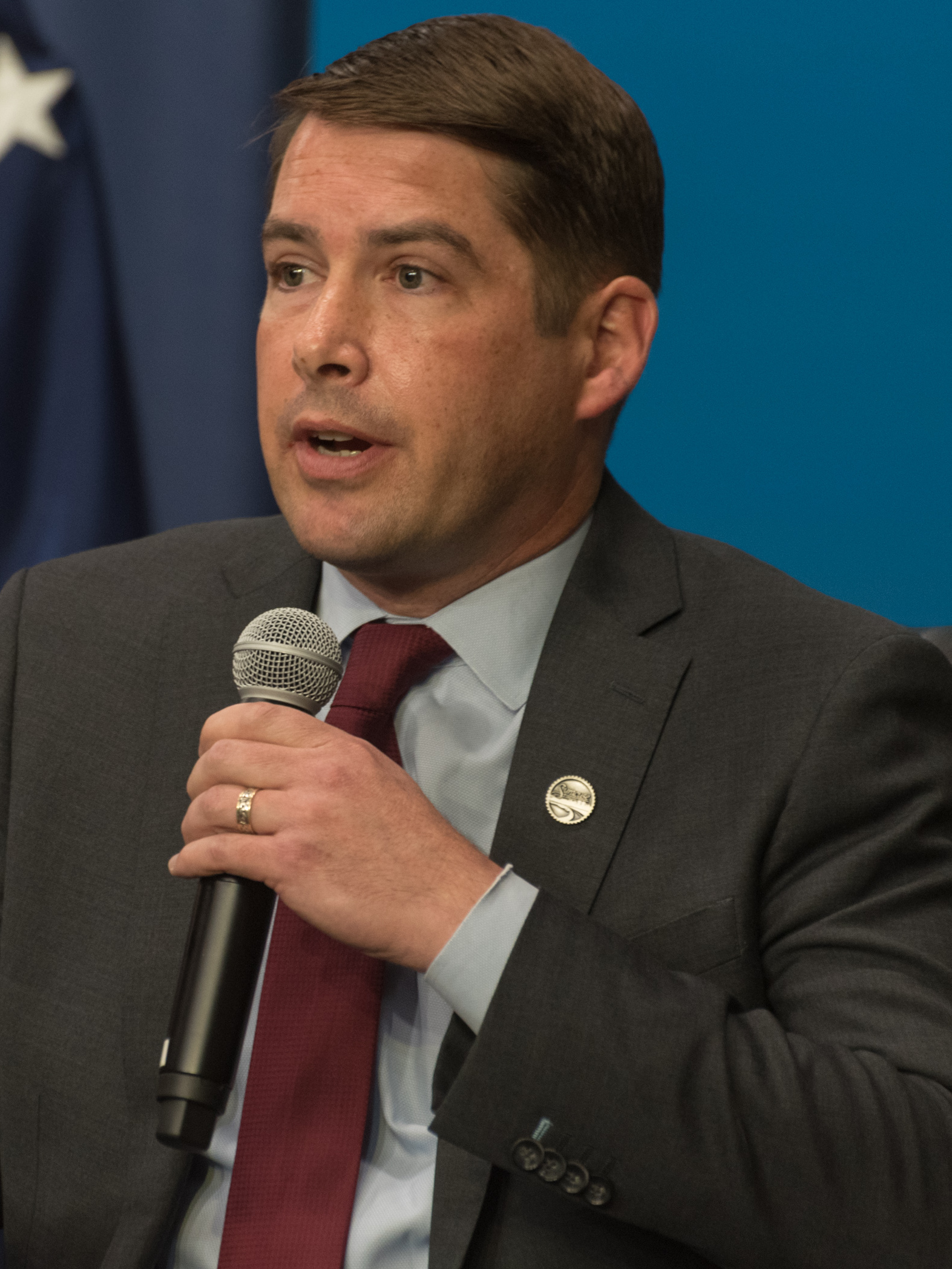

Candidate	Ben Walsh	Juanita Perez Williams
Party	Independent	Democratic
Alliance	Independence; Reform
Popular vote	13,584	9,701
Percentage	53.21%	38.00%
- Results by ward Walsh: 40–50% 50–60% 60–70% Williams: 40–50% 60–70% 70–80%
Mayor before election
Stephanie Miner
Democratic
Elected mayor
Ben Walsh
Independent

The 2017 mayoral election in Syracuse, New York was held on November 7, 2017, and resulted in the election of Ben Walsh, an independent, to his first term as mayor.

=== Background ===
Incumbent mayor Stephanie Miner, a member of the Democratic Party, was first elected in 2009 and was re-elected in 2013, but was term limited in 2017. Syracuse last elected a Republican Party mayor in 1997, and in the 2013 election Republicans did not field a candidate.

=== Democratic primary ===
2017 Syracuse Democratic mayoral primary
Party	Candidate	Votes	%
Democratic	Juanita Perez Williams	4,421	51.72%
Democratic	Joe Nicoletti	2,958	34.60%
Democratic	Martin Masterpole	828	9.69%
	Write-ins	341	3.99%
Total votes		8,548	100%

=== General election ===
Five candidates appeared on the general election ballot: Green Party nominee Howie Hawkins, who had run for office 20 times since 1991; Democratic Party nominee Juanita Perez Williams, the city's former corporation counsel; Independence Party, Reform Party and Upstate Jobs Party nominee Ben Walsh, a business development director and the son of U.S. Representative James T. Walsh; Republican nominee Laura Lavine, a former Lafayette School District superintendent; and Working Families Party nominee Joe Nicoletti, who remained on the Working Families party line after unsuccessfully seeking the Democratic nomination and did not campaign. City auditor Martin Masterpole also sought the Democratic nomination.

2017 Syracuse mayoral election
Party	Candidate	Votes	%
Independence	Ben Walsh	12,351	48.38%
Reform/Upstate Jobs	Ben Walsh	1,233	4.83%
Total	Ben Walsh	13,584	53.21%
Democratic	Juanita Perez Williams	9,701	38.00%
Green	Howie Hawkins	1,017	4.02%
Republican	Laura B. Lavine	673	2.64%
Working Families	Joe Nicoletti	305	1.19%
	Write-ins	25	0.10%
Total votes		25,555	100%
Independent gain from Democratic			

== 2021 ==
2021 Syracuse mayoral election
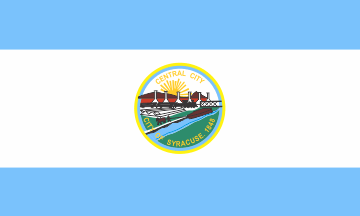
- November 2, 2021
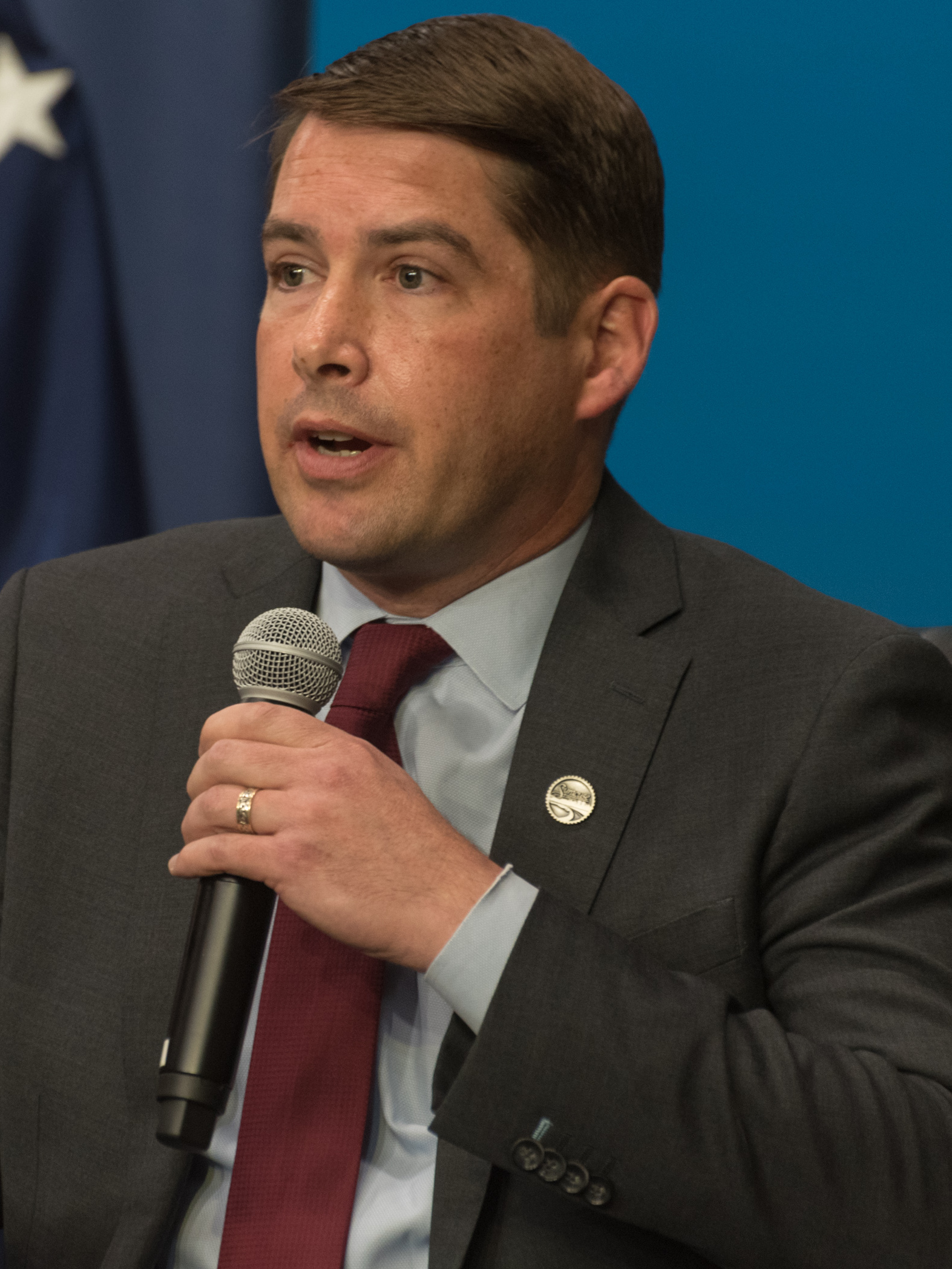

Candidate	Ben Walsh	Khalid Bey	Janet Burman
Party	Independent	Democratic	Republican
Alliance	Independence		Conservative
Popular vote	10,987	4,923	2,144
Percentage	61%	27%	11.84%
- Results by ward Walsh: 40–50% 50–60% 60–70% 70–80% Bey: 50–60% 60–70%
Mayor before election
Ben Walsh
Independent
Elected mayor
Ben Walsh
Independent

The Syracuse mayoral election of 2021 was held November 2, 2021. Incumbent Independent mayor Ben Walsh was seeking re-election to a second term in office. The local committees of the Democratic, Republican, Conservative, and Working Families parties each endorsed a candidate, however the candidates who did not receive their party's endorsement could force a primary if they wished.

=== Background ===
In 2017, incumbent Democratic mayor Stephanie Miner was term limited and could not seek reelection. Ben Walsh won the race to succeed her, defeating Democrat Juanita Perez Williams. Walsh comes from a family of Republican politicians. He is the son of Jim Walsh, former U.S. Representative from New York's 25th congressional district, and the grandson of William Walsh, former U.S. representative from New York's 33rd congressional district and former Mayor of Syracuse. However, Walsh himself is registered as an independent, and was the first Independent elected mayor of Syracuse in 104 years. Walsh ran on three ballot lines: Independence, Reform, and a new line that he created for himself, Upstate Jobs. When Walsh confirmed that he would seek re-election, he did not clarify which lines he would campaign under.

Walsh sought the endorsement of the Working Families Party, one of four parties that surpassed the threshold for automatic ballot access in the 2020 presidential election (the other three are the Democratic Party, the Republican Party, and the Conservative Party), but did not receive it. He has received the nomination of the Independence Party, but will need to collect 1,500 signatures in order to ensure that the Independence line will be on the 2021 ballot. On May 25, 2021, Walsh submitted 2,538 signatures to create a dedicated party ballot line.

=== Democratic primary ===
The Onondaga County Democratic Committee endorsed Greene on February 17, 2021. 58% of the committee's members voted for Greene, while 42% voted for Bey. However, Bey chose to continue his candidacy and force a primary.

==== Candidates ====
===== Declared =====
- Khalid Bey, President pro tempore of the Syracuse common council
- Michael Greene, at-large common councilor (endorsed by committee)

===== Declined =====
- Yusuf Abdul-Qadir, director of the New York Civil Liberties Union
- Latoya Allen, common councillor (endorsed Bey)
- Patrick Hogan, common councillor (endorsed Bey)
- Marty Masterpole, Onondaga County Comptroller, former Syracuse City Auditor, and candidate for mayor in 2017
- Tim Rudd, director of the Syracuse Office of Management and Budget and former at-large common councillor

==== Fundraising ====
Campaign finance reports as of May 21, 2021
Candidate	Total raised
Khalid Bey	$25,716
Michael Greene	$87,470

==== Results ====
Democratic primary
Party	Candidate	Votes	%
Democratic	Khalid Bey	2,720	49.9%
Democratic	Michael Greene	2,674	49.0%
Write-in		62	1.1%
Total votes		5,456	100.0%

=== Republican primary ===
The Syracuse Republican Committee endorsed Burman as its mayoral candidate on January 21. However, despite receiving her party's endorsement, Burman did not officially declare her candidacy until March 10. Babilon entered the race on March 1, declaring his intent to force a primary against Burman. The primary was held on June 22.

==== Candidates ====
===== Declared =====
- Thomas Babilon, attorney, former member of the Syracuse corporation counsel, and Libertarian candidate for the Syracuse common council in 2019
- Janet Burman, economist, former chair of the Syracuse Republican Committee and the Onondaga County Republican Party, and nominee for District 53 of the New York Senate in 2018 (endorsed by committee)

===== Declined =====
- Ben Walsh, incumbent mayor (Note: Candidate is an independent, but can still receive any party's nomination thanks to New York's electoral fusion system.)

==== Fundraising ====
Campaign finance reports as of May 21, 2021
Candidate	Total raised
Thomas Babilon	$7,555
Janet Burman	$6,903

==== Results ====
Republican primary
Party	Candidate	Votes	%
Republican	Janet Burman	499	66.6%
Republican	Thomas Babilon	235	31.4%
Write-in		15	2.0%
Total votes		749	100.0%

=== Conservative endorsement ===
The Conservative Party endorsed Burman as its mayoral candidate.

==== Endorsed candidate ====
- Janet Burman, economist, former chair of the Syracuse Republican Committee and the Onondaga County Republican Party, and nominee for District 53 of the New York Senate in 2018 (Note: Candidate is a member of the Republican Party, but can still seek any party's nomination thanks to New York's electoral fusion system.)

=== Nominees/endorsements of parties without automatic ballot access ===
==== Independence Party ====
The Independence Party endorsed Walsh as its mayoral candidate on February 24. Because the party lost automatic ballot access in the 2020 presidential election, On May 25, 2021, Walsh submitted 2,538 signatures to create a dedicated party ballot line.

===== Endorsed candidate =====
- Ben Walsh, incumbent mayor

=== Working Families endorsement ===
The Syracuse Working Families Committee chose not to endorse any candidate in the mayoral election, meaning that its ballot line would go unfilled.

==== Endorsed candidate ====
- None

==== Not endorsed ====
- Khalid Bey, President pro tempore of the Syracuse common council (Note: Candidate is a member of the Democratic Party, but can still seek any party's nomination thanks to New York's electoral fusion system.)
- Michael Greene, at-large common councillor
- Ben Walsh, incumbent mayor

=== General election ===
==== Fundraising ====
Campaign finance reports as of July 19, 2021
Candidate (party)	Total raised
Ben Walsh (I)	$277,108
Khalid Bey (D)	$36,379
Janet Burman (R)	$8,657

==== Results ====
2021 Syracuse Mayoral Election
Party	Candidate	Votes	%
Independence	Ben Walsh (incumbent)	12,013	59.6%
Democratic	Khalid Bey	5,520	27.4%
Republican	Janet Burman	1,786	8.9%
Conservative	Janet Burman	567	2.8%
Total	Janet Burman	2,353	11.7%
Write-in		57	0.3%
Total votes		20,163	100%
Independent hold			

=== Campaign websites ===
- Michael Greene (D) for Mayor
- Ben Walsh (I) for Mayor

== 2025 ==
2025 Syracuse mayoral election
- November 4, 2025
Candidate	Sharon Owens	Thomas Babilon
Party	Democratic	Republican
Popular vote	14,265	3,603
Percentage	73.8%	18.6%
Mayor before election
Ben Walsh
Independent
Elected mayor
Sharon Owens
Democratic

The 2025 Syracuse mayoral election was held on November 4, 2025. The incumbent mayor, independent Ben Walsh, was term limited and not eligible for reelection. Deputy Mayor Democrat Sharon Owens won the election in a landslide, receiving 74% of the vote, defeating Republican Thomas Babilon, Independent Alfonso Davis, and Independent Tim Rudd. She is the first Black American to become mayor of Syracuse.

=== Democratic primary ===
==== Declared ====
- Sharon Owens, deputy mayor
- Patrick Hogan, common councilor and candidate for mayor in 2013
- Chol Majok, common councilor

==== Disqualified ====
- Alfonso Davis, political consultant and perennial candidate
- Jimmy Oliver, Syracuse Police Engagement Officer

==== Declined ====
- Tim Rudd, former at-large common councilor (running as an independent)

==== Endorsements ====
Sharon Owens

State legislators

- Rachel May, state senator from the 48th district (2019–present)

Local officials

- Anthony Davis, superintendent of the Syracuse City School District
- Michael Monds, Chief of the Syracuse Fire Department
- Ben Walsh, mayor of Syracuse (2018–present) (Independent)

Individuals

- Ana Maria Archila, activist and co-director of the New York Working Families Party

Party chapters

- Working Families Party

Labor unions

- 1199SEIU United Healthcare Workers East

Organizations

- Citizen Action of New York
- College Democrats at Syracuse University
- College Democrats of America
- College Democrats of New York
Patrick Hogan

State legislators

- Pamela Hunter, Speaker pro tempore of the New York State Assembly (2025–present) from the 128th district (2015–present)
- Bill Magnarelli, state assemblymember from the 129th district (1999–present)
- Chris Ryan, state senator from the 50th district (2025–present)

Local officials

- Tamica Barnett, president of the Syracuse City School District board of education
- Rasheada Caldwell, at-large common councilor
- Helen Hudson, president of the Syracuse common council

Party chapters

- Onondaga County Democratic Committee
- Syracuse Democrats
Chol Majok

Local officials

- Gwendolyn Raeford, Syracuse City School District board of education commissioner

==== Results ====
2025 Syracuse Democratic mayoral primary
Party	Candidate	Votes	%
Democratic	Sharon Owens	4,711	62.32%
Democratic	Patrick Hogan	1,723	22.79%
Democratic	Chol Majok	1,115	14.75%
Write-in		10	0.13%
Total votes		7,559	100%

=== Republican nomination ===
==== Nominee ====
- Thomas Babilon, attorney and candidate for mayor in 2021

==== Withdrew ====
- Tim Rudd, former Democratic at-large common councilor (running as an independent)

==== Endorsements ====
Thomas Babilon

Party chapters

- Onondaga County Republican Committee

=== Independents ===
==== Declared ====
- Alfonso Davis, Syracuse Common Councilor
- Tim Rudd, former Democratic at-large common councilor

=== General Election ===
==== Results ====
2025 Syracuse Mayoral Election
Party	Candidate	Votes	%
Democratic	Sharon Owens	14,265	73.8%
Republican	Thomas Babilon	3,603	18.6%
Independent	Alfonso Davis	700	3.6%
Independent	Timothy Rudd	630	3.3%
Write-in		127	0.7%
Total votes		19,325	100%

=== External links ===
Official campaign websites

- Thomas Babilon (R) for mayor
- Sharon Owens (D) for Mayor
- Tim Rudd (I) for Mayor
