= Syracuse Suburban Airport =

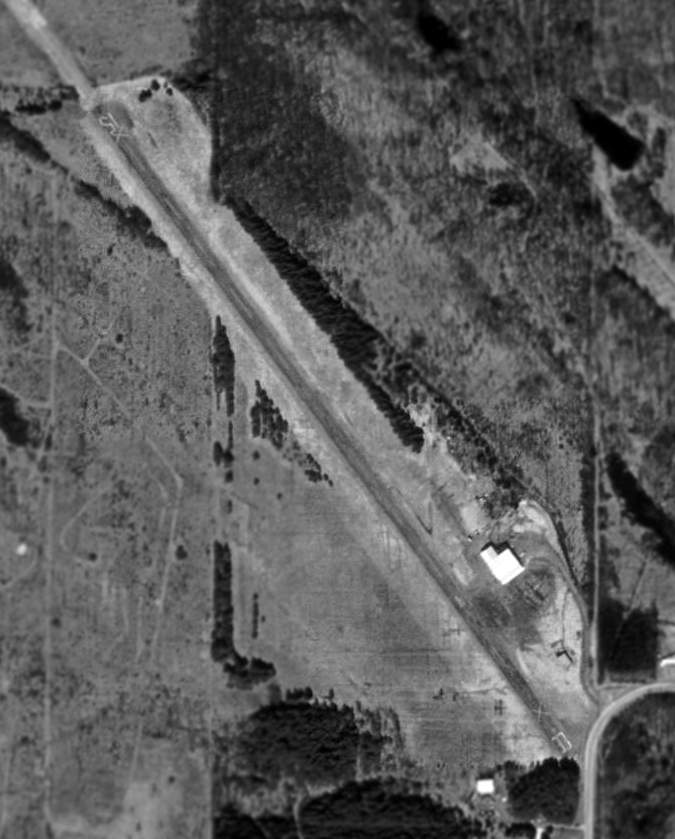
- USGS aerial image, 1995
- IATA: none; ICAO: none; FAA LID: ~~6NK~~

Summary
- Airport type: Public
- Owner: Syracuse Suburban Airport LLC
- Serves: Syracuse, New York
- Location: Central Square, New York
- Elevation AMSL: 400 ft / 122 m
- Coordinates: 43°16′02″N 076°10′46″W
- Interactive map of Syracuse Suburban Airport

Runways
Direction	Length		Surface
Direction	ft	m	Surface
16/34	2,500	762	Asphalt
- Source: Federal Aviation Administration

Syracuse Suburban Airport (FAA LID: ~~6NK~~) is a former privately owned public-use airport in Oswego County, New York, United States. It is located 13 nautical miles (24 km) north of the central business district of the city of Syracuse. The airport is off Gildner Road in the village of Central Square, which is located in the Town of Hastings. The airport redevelopment was not completed and one of the owners pleaded guilty to bank fraud in July 2014.

According to the FAA's National Plan of Integrated Airport Systems for 2009–2013, the facility is categorized as a reliever airport for the Syracuse Hancock International Airport.

== History ==
The airfield dates back to around 1960, and it was in operation until the mid-1980s. Its original name was Central Square Airport. In the 1970s the town board changed the zoning to residential but the airport was exempted as long as it remained open.

Syracuse Suburban Airport LLC purchased the 93 acre airport site for $350,000 on July 2, 2004. That same year it was awarded a $300,000 grant from New York State to rehabilitate its runway and conduct a master plan study that would be required to complete additional projects. In 2005 the company spent $414,000 to purchase three additional properties totaling 91 acres (370,000 m^{2}).

In January 2008, the Hastings Town Board denied a zoning change that would have allowed Syracuse Suburban Airport to reopen. The town contends the grandfathered use as an airport expired because the previous owner sold the property in 2004 and it hasn't been used as an airport since that time. However, the current owners have a pending lawsuit against the Hastings Zoning Board of Appeals, which will be heard in the New York State Supreme Court.

One of the airport's owners also owned Michael Airfield in nearby Cicero, New York, which has been closed. That airport's federally funded status was transferred to Syracuse Suburban Airport, where a new runway was under construction in 2009. The new runway was completed in 2010.

== Facilities ==
Syracuse Suburban Airport covers an area of 94 acres (38 ha) at an elevation of 400 feet (122 m) above mean sea level. It has one runway designated 16/34 which measures 2,500 by 60 feet (762 x 18 m).

Previous FAA records listed a runway 15/33 with a 2,660 by 43 foot (811 x 13 m) asphalt surface. Although still listed as operational by the FAA, aerial photographs showed the runway marked with X's which indicated that it was closed.
