= Syracuse Municipal Airport =

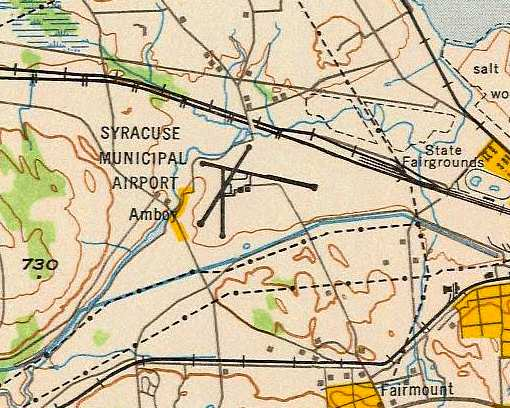
- IATA: none; ICAO: none

Summary
- Airport type: Municipal
- Operator: City of Syracuse
- Location: Camillus (town), New York
- Coordinates: 43°04′29″N 76°16′05″W
- Interactive map of Syracuse Municipal Airport

Syracuse Municipal Airport was an airport located in Camillus, NY.

== Origins ==
The first plane landed at the site of the airport in 1912 and was flown by Harry Atwood, establishing a long-distance flight record from Chicago, Il to Camillus. The airport expanded over the next few years and by 1925 became known as the Amboy Airport.

== Municipal Airport ==
By 1926, Syracuse Mayor Charles Hanna felt that the city needed an airport to enhance its economic future. The city scouted a number of small airports in the area, including Bethka Field (near the intersection of Thompson Rd. and James St. in the city proper) and Nedrow Field in nearby Nedrow, NY. The city finally decided upon the Amboy Airport and purchased it from Camillus for $50,000. After its official opening in 1927, Mayor Hanna put the airfield under the direction of the City Parks Department.

After being purchased by the city, the airport gained popularity. The first airmail was delivered in 1929. In the following years before World War II, the airport featured appearances by many world-famous pilots including Charles Lindbergh and his Spirit of St. Louis airplane in 1927, Will Rogers and Wiley Post in 1931, General Jimmy Doolittle in 1932, Amelia Earhart in 1936, Douglas “Wrong Way” Corrigan in 1938; as well as celebrities Kate Smith and Lowell Thomas.

== World War II ==
After the war broke out, local flight instructors were pressed into military service and the airport turned into a flight training center. Shortly thereafter, the demands of the military quickly outgrew the capabilities of the current airport and the Office of the Chief of the Army Air Force allocated funds and authorized the construction of Hancock Field. However, the Municipal Airport still played a vital role in the war effort, serving as a training facility for civilians moving supplies and equipment and pilots patrolling the east coast for German ships and U-boats.

== Closure ==
1994 USGS aerial photo showing the former site of the airfield. A short segment of a runway turnaround area is visible in the middle left as well as hangars upper left.

After the war, the city took over operations of Hancock Field, converting it to a commercial airfield in 1948. The smaller Municipal Airport couldn't compete with the larger and more centrally located Syracuse Hancock International Airport and closed in 1949. After its closure, most of the land the airport was located on was acquired by Allied Chemical and Dye Corporation and transformed into chemical waste beds by 1951.
