= Benjamin Walsh =

Benjamin Walsh may refer to:

- Benjamin Dann Walsh (1808–1869), American entomologist
- Benjamin Walsh (British politician) (c.1775–c.1818), British politician
- Ben Walsh (born 1979), American politician
