= Will House =

Will House may refer to:

== Places ==
in the United States (by state)

- Louis Will House, Syracuse, New York, listed on the National Register of Historic Places (NRHP) in New York
- H. P. Will House, Wessington Springs, South Dakota, listed on the NRHP in South Dakota

== Person ==
- Will House (cricketer), an English cricketer
