= Rolland B. Marvin =

American politician

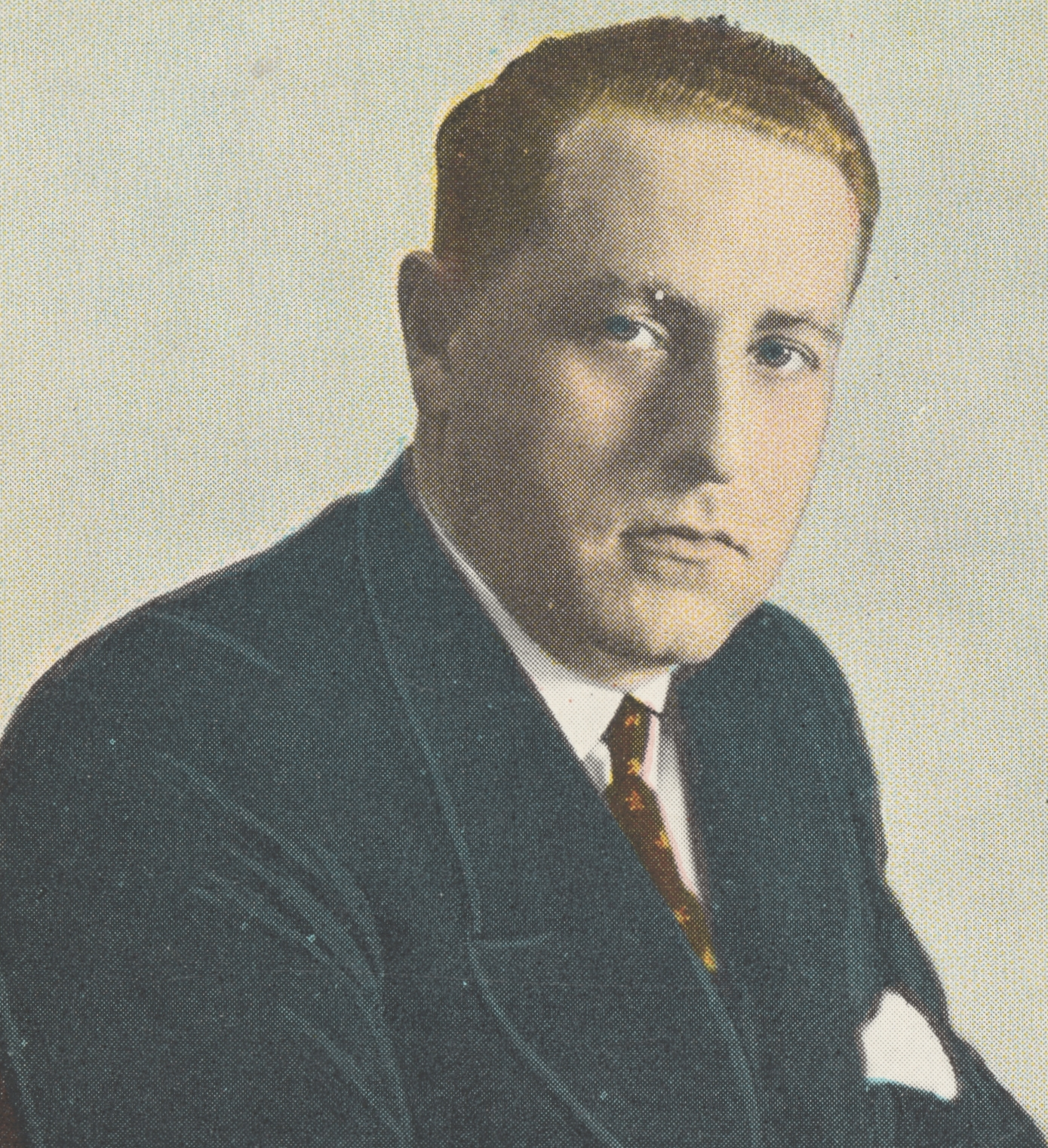
Marvin c. 1930s

Rolland B. Marvin (1897? - August 14, 1979) was a politician from the United States. He was the mayor of Syracuse, New York, for five terms as a Republican from 1930 to 1941.

First elected as mayor at the age of 33, during this term he helped get Carrier Corporation to move to the city. He also oversaw the building of a new rail station and elevating the tracks, as well as MacArthur Stadium to house baseball's Syracuse Chiefs. He had to cut the city's budget, as he elected right before the 1929 stock market crash and ensuing Great Depression, and cut his own salary by 40 percent. He also fired all women from city employment who had husbands earning a living wage.

His name was considered for a nomination for New York Governor in the 1930s and 1940s, but he never ran for that office. He did run unsuccessfully for New York State Senate in 1944.

Marvin did not always agree with his political party and was often opposed to Governor Thomas E. Dewey; he supported Wendell Willkie's presidential bid in 1940 instead of Dewey. He chaired the Onondaga County Republican Party from 1936 until 1945, and then started a law practice.

Marvin died in Syracuse on August 14, 1979, survived by his wife and two children.

Political offices
Preceded by Charles Hanna	Mayor of Syracuse, NY; 1930–1941	Succeeded by Thomas Edward Kennedy
