= Stone Arabia School =

- U.S. National Register of Historic Places
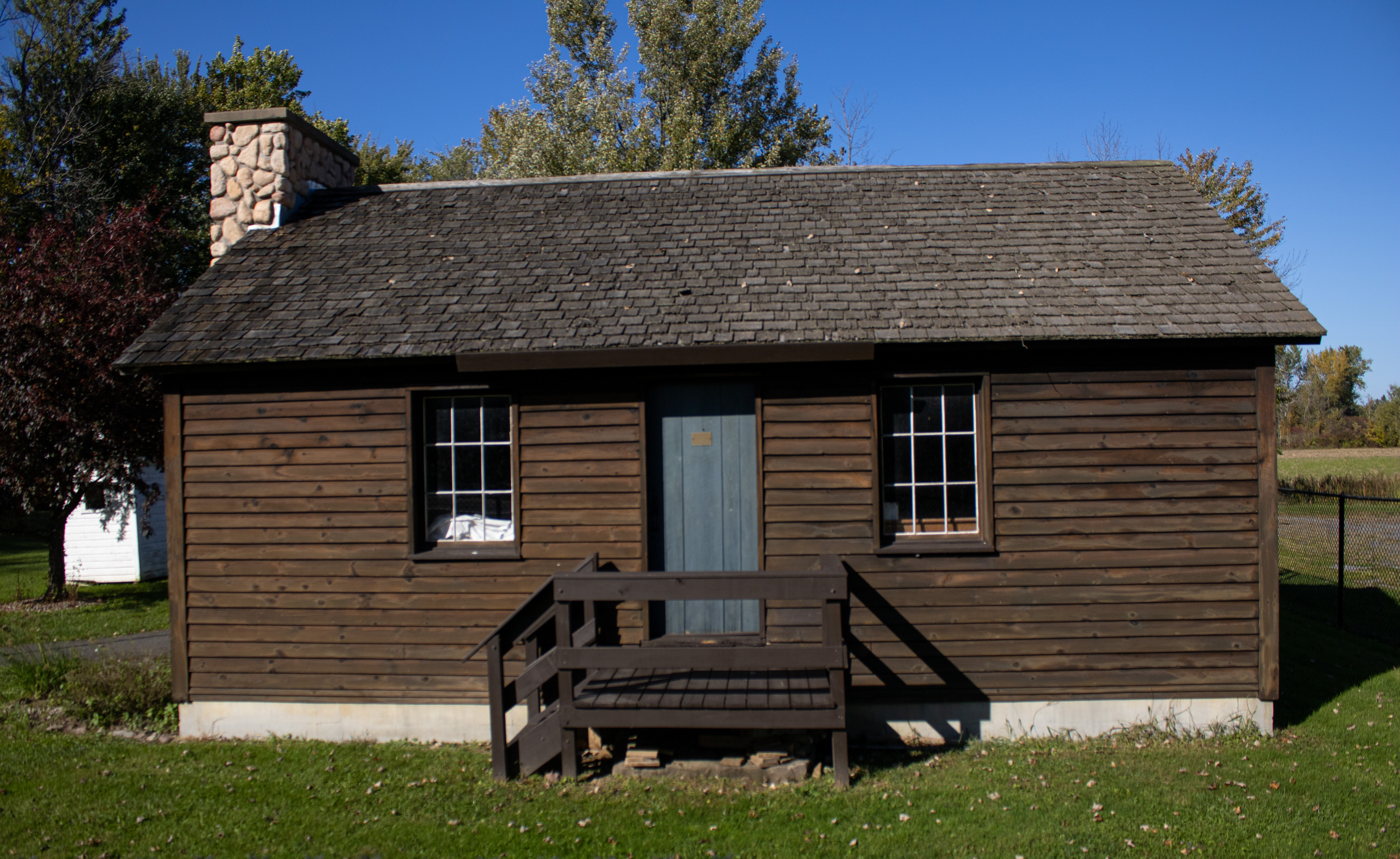

- Location within New York Location within the United States
- Interactive map showing the location for Stone Arabia School
- Location: 6453 NY 31, Cicero, New York
- Coordinates: 43°10′39″N 76°4′31″W
- Built: 1854
- Architectural style: Greek Revival
- NRHP reference No.: 07000289
- Added to NRHP: April 12, 2007

Stone Arabia School, also known now as Stone Arabia Schoolhouse Museum, was built in 1854 in Cicero, New York. It is significant as "an outstanding example of a mid-nineteenth century modest Greek Revival style one-room schoolhouse". It was listed on the National Register of Historic Places in 2007.

It is operated by a local history group, the Cicero Historical Society, and is open on weekends during the summer. Also included at the site is a historic log cabin.

It is located on New York State Route 31 just east of South Bay Road which runs from Syracuse to Oneida Lake.
