= Rocco Pirro =

American football player and politician (1916–1995)

No. 23, 30
- Positions: Guard, Tackle, Back

Personal information
- Born: June 30, 1916; Syracuse, New York, U.S.
- Died: January 26, 1995 (aged 78); Syracuse, New York, U.S.
- Listed height: 6 ft 0 in (1.83 m)
- Listed weight: 226 lb (103 kg)

Career information
- College: Catholic
- NFL draft: 1940: 12th round, 102nd overall pick

Career history

Playing
- Pittsburgh Steelers (1940–1941); Buffalo Bills (1946-1949)

Coaching
- Baltimore Colts (1950) Line coach; Montreal Alouettes (1951) Line coach

Career NFL/AAFC statistics
- Games: 20
- Games started: 1
- Interceptions: 1
- Stats at Pro Football Reference

Rocco A. Pirro (June 30, 1916 – January 26, 1995) was an American football player and politician.

== Football career ==
He was a fullback for The Catholic University of America and played in the 1940 Sun Bowl, where he was described as "5-foot 10-inch and 185-pound Arizona jackrabbit."

Pirro was drafted in the 12th round of the 1940 NFL Draft. Pirro was a professional American football Guard who played from 1940 to 1941 with the Pittsburgh Steelers and from 1946 to 1949 with the Buffalo Bills.

== Political and business career ==
During World War II, Pirro served in the United States Navy. Pirro worked as executive director of the Solvay-Geddes Youth Center and the Onondaga County, New York Youth Board. Pirro served on the Geddes, New York Town Board and as town supervisor. He was involved with the Republican Party. He was a member of the New York State Assembly (120th D.) in 1974. In November 1974, he ran for re-election, but was defeated by Democrat/Conservative Melvin N. Zimmer.

== Death ==
Pirro died on January 26, 1995, in Syracuse, New York, at the Van Duyn Home and Hospital.

New York State Assembly
Preceded by Edward M. Kinsella	New York State Assembly; 120th District; 1974	Succeeded by Melvin N. Zimmer
