= Michael Airfield =

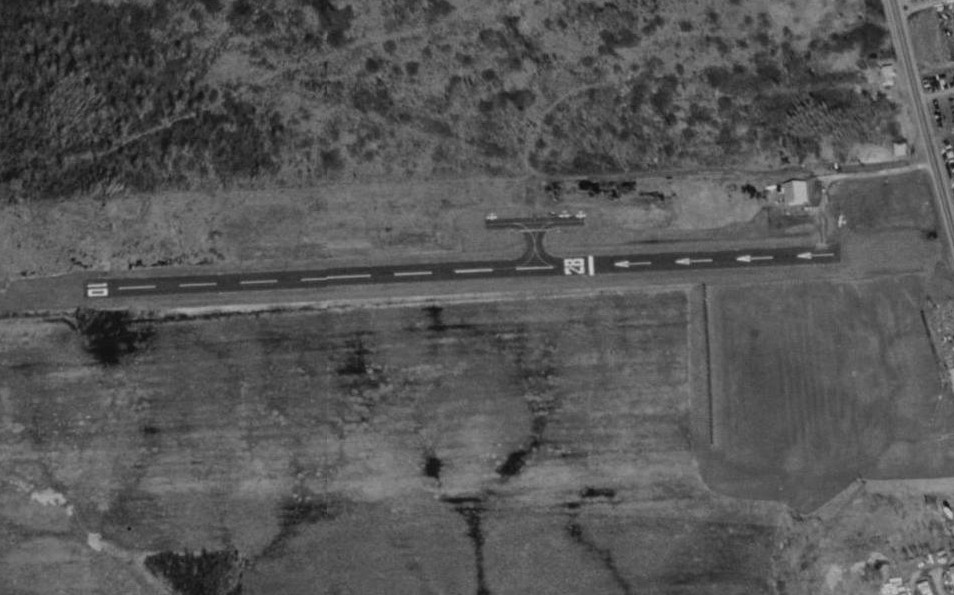
- Michael Airfield, 27 March 1995
- IATA: none; ICAO: none; FAA LID: 1G6

Summary
- Airport type: public
- Owner: David Pizio
- Location: Cicero, New York
- Built: 1944
- Elevation AMSL: 400 ft / 122 m
- Coordinates: 43°10′54″N 76°07′40″W
- Interactive map of Michael Airfield

Runways
Direction	Length		Surface
Direction	ft	m	Surface
10/ 28	2,500	760	asphalt

Statistics (2006)
- Operations: 1,502
- Based aircraft: 1
- Source: Federal Aviation Administration

Michael Airfield (FAA LID: 1G6) is a public airport located on 34 acres just northwest of the central business district of Cicero, New York, United States. The airport is privately owned but open to public flight operations.

== Facilities and background ==
CLOSED BY FAA NYADO AUGUST 2009. PUBLIC USE OPERATIONS TO BE TAKEN OVER BY SYRACUSE SUBURBAN 6NK AFTER RECONSTRUCTION. Michael Airfield's sole runway, 10/28, was 2,500 feet (760 m) long with a grooved asphalt surface. According to the Federal Aviation Administration's airport master record for Michael Airfield, issued following a September 27, 2006 inspection, runway markings for 10/28 were very faded and the field was unattended. The airport, which sits beneath Syracuse Hancock International Airport's Class C airspace, was established in December 1944. In the 1990s, the little used airport was unable to cover its taxes and put up for sale for US$500,000.

The airport, now owned by David Pizio, was listed in the third addition of John Purner's book The $100 Hamburger: A Guide to Pilots' Favorite Fly-in Restaurants. A $100 Hamburger is aviation slang referring to a meal eaten at an airport or nearby restaurant following a general aviation flight made by a pilot who, looking for an excuse to fly, decides to eat at a non-local airport.

== See also ==
- List of airports in New York
