= Stephanie Miner =

American politician and attorney from New York State (born 1970)

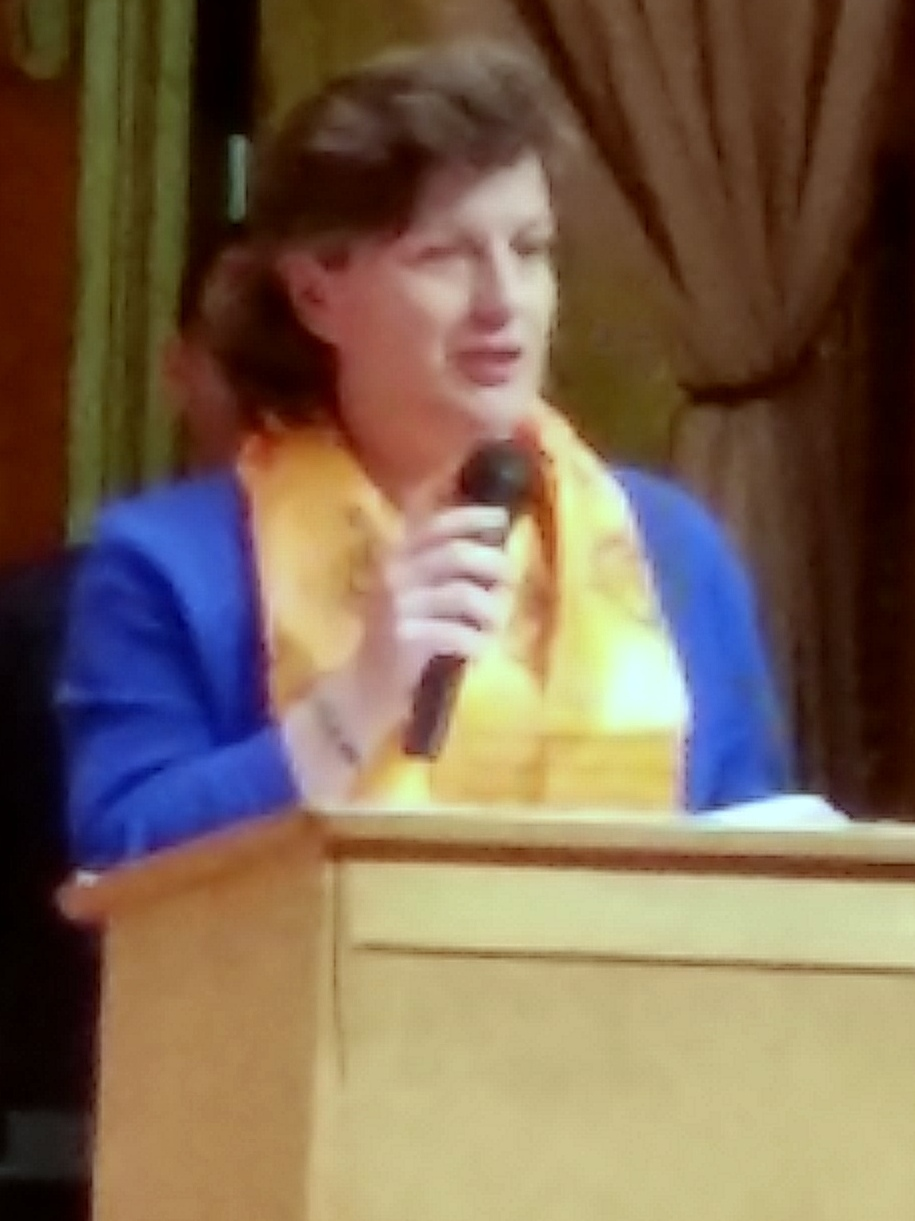
- Miner in 2016

Chair of the New York Democratic Party
- In office June 5, 2012 – April 17, 2014 Serving with Keith L. T. Wright
- Preceded by: Jay S. Jacobs
- Succeeded by: Keith L. T. Wright

53rd Mayor of Syracuse
- In office January 1, 2010 – January 1, 2018
- Preceded by: Matt Driscoll
- Succeeded by: Ben Walsh

Personal details
- Born: Stephanie Ann Miner; April 30, 1970 (age 56) Syracuse, New York, U.S.
- Party: Democratic; Serve America Movement (2018–2022)
- Spouse: John Mannion (m. 2006; died 2019)
- Education: Syracuse University (BA); State University of New York, Buffalo (JD)

Stephanie Ann Miner (born April 30, 1970) is an American attorney and politician who served as the mayor of Syracuse, New York, from 2010 to 2018, the first woman to have held that office. Prior to her mayoralty, she was a member of the Syracuse City Council. Miner co-chaired the New York State Democratic Party from 2012 to 2014. In 2018, Miner ran unsuccessfully for governor of New York on the newly-created Serve America Movement line.

== Early life, education and career ==
On April 30, 1970, Miner was born in Syracuse, New York to Edward Miner, MD, a physician and an Army officer, and Dianne Cooney, a nurse who later served as dean of the Wegmans School of Nursing at St. John Fisher College. Miner became involved in politics at an early age by stuffing envelopes for local candidates at her grandmother's kitchen table in the Eastwood neighborhood.

Miner attended high school in Homer, New York, where she was senior class president and voted "most likely to succeed." She received her B.A., magna cum laude, in journalism and political science from Syracuse University in 1992 and her J.D. from the University at Buffalo Law School in 1999.

== Early career ==
In 1994, she served as a regional representative for then-governor of New York Mario Cuomo. Upon graduating from law school, Miner was hired at the Syracuse law firm Blitman and King LLP, where she worked until resigning in March 2009 to focus on her mayoral campaign.

In her first run for public office in 2001, Miner ran for one of two at-large Syracuse Common Council seats that were up for election. She won, placing first among four candidates. Her tough leadership on important city issues propelled her to re-election in 2005 when she again placed first among four candidates for the two seats. Miner received the most votes of any candidate on the ballot, including the incumbent mayor.

As a Common Councilor, Miner championed and helped pass legislation that gave $1 million in initial funding to Say Yes to Education, a program that provides necessary support services for Syracuse City School Districts students and promises free or reduced college tuition to students who graduate from City high schools.

== Mayor of Syracuse ==
In 2009, Miner—running as a Democrat—defeated Republican Steve Kimatian, 50%–39%, in the general election and became the city's first female mayor. Miner was re-elected in 2013, winning 68% of the vote in defeating two third-party candidates.

Miner was the 53rd Mayor of the City of Syracuse. She is the first woman elected Mayor of Syracuse and the first woman to lead one of New York's "Big 5" cities. Her second term concluded on January 1, 2018, and she did not seek re-election.

=== Fiscal priorities ===
Miner vetoed $2 million in amendments passed by the council to her $657 million budget. Miner stated that the council's sales tax estimates were "phantom revenues" which, if they materialized, should be saved.

In 2014, Miner announced that since she took office in 2010, the city had reversed the general funds deficit trend and achieved an $8.4 million budget surplus in the fiscal year ending in 2012.

In 2013, Miner was named one of the "trailblazing women in public finance" by Northeast Women in Public Finance and The Bond Buyer in recognition of her role in drawing attention to the fiscal plight of cities.

==== Opposition to Destiny USA tax breaks ====
In 2012, Miner announced that Robert Congel did not plan to build a promised future Destiny USA expansion, including a hotel and more retail space. However, Miner added that Congel would not have to pay property taxes or PILOT payments on the Carousel Center expansion or the original mall for 30 years under the terms of a 2007 agreement forged by former mayor Matt Driscoll.

In 2014, Miner and County Executive Joanie Mahoney received a letter from Destiny signaling their intent to build a 252-room hotel. Destiny indicated it would be seeking new tax breaks from the Onondaga County Industrial Development Agency (OCIDA). Destiny officials were seeking an 18-year payment in lieu of taxes deal exempting the developer from County and City taxes on the new hotel. The new exemption would cost taxpayers approximately $20 million in tax revenue. Miner believed that any hotel construction to support the mall should be privately financed. Destiny received a 30-year break on local taxes after it promised to build a LEED Platinum, 39-story, 1,342- room "Emerald 5 ShowTel and Conference Center." However, Destiny stated that they would not be building the hotel or the other amenities it promised, they were still legally entitled to its 30-year PILOT.

==== Pension-smoothing opposition ====
Miner is a vocal opponent of Gov. Andrew Cuomo's policies on pensions and financially distressed cities. Mayor Miner publicized Gov. Cuomo was failing to take charge of the issue and had offered cities an "accounting gimmick" called pension smoothing instead. Miner publicly broke with Cuomo on his proposal to stabilize rising pension costs earlier that year.

=== Ideas and innovation ===
In 2015, Miner established the first-ever Mayor's office of Innovation using a grant from Bloomberg Philanthropies.

Miner was part of the Governing Institute Women in Government Leadership Program Class of 2015, a program that highlights the outstanding contributions of women currently in public office, and to encourage future generations of leaders.

=== Infrastructure ===
Miner attended the Clinton Global Initiative America Conference in both 2014 and 2015 to discuss infrastructure for cities and states. Miner also met with members of Congress and submitted testimony before the United States Senate and the New York State Legislature detailing the infrastructure needs of the City of Syracuse. Miner is a member of Rebuild New York Now, a coalition of construction trades, business owners, and elected officials.

==== Joint Schools Construction Board ====
Miner revamped the Joint Schools Construction Board in an effort to rebuild and remodel Syracuse City School District buildings. Four schools were totally renovated, and the project was authorized to include $300 million of individual projects at up to 15 schools. Mayor Miner served as chair of the board.

==== Syracuse Regional Airport Authority ====
Miner spearheaded the effort to develop the Syracuse Regional Airport Authority. Miner also opened a $60 million renovation for the airport in 2013.

== New York State Democratic Party Co-Chair ==
Miner served as Co-Chair of the New York State Democratic Committee from 2012 to 2014.

== Post-mayoral career ==
On June 18, 2018, Miner announced that she intended to run for Governor of New York. According to The New York Times, Miner, "once an ally of Mr. Cuomo's, became something of an outlier in Democratic circles when she emerged as a vocal and persistent critic of the governor and his policies, beginning five years ago and culminating now in a direct challenge as he seeks a third term." Miner "[planned] to run under the banner of an upstart new group, the Serve America Movement, which calls itself SAM (coincidentally sharing Miner's initials), formed by people disaffected by the existing party structure after the 2016 elections. She will be the group’s first candidate." Miner circulated designating petitions to create a SAM Party in New York, and on August 21, her campaign announced that it had submitted over 40,000 petition signatures. On Election Day, Miner and running mate Michael Volpe received 55,441 votes (0.91%).

In 2021, Miner began writing a book about her two mayor terms.

== Personal life ==
Miner was married to John F. X. Mannion from 2006 until his death in 2019.

Following her mayoral tenure, Miner was awarded the Charles Evans Hughes Visiting Chair of Government and Jurisprudence in the Department of Political Science position at Colgate University.

Political offices
Preceded by Matthew Driscoll	Mayor of Syracuse, NY; 2010–2018	Succeeded by Ben Walsh
