= John Henry Walrath =

American politician

John Henry Walrath (October 10, 1866 – June 24, 1948) was a lawyer and politician from the United States. He was the mayor of Syracuse, New York for two terms as a Democrat from 1922 to 1925.

Walrath was born in Chittenango, New York in 1866. He studied law and was admitted to the bar in 1889. In 1916, he was elected district attorney for Onondaga County, a first for a Democrat in the county.

He was elected Syracuse mayor in November 1921, the first Democrat in 20 years in the Republican stronghold city, defeating Republican nominee Deforest Settle.

Walrath died in Syracuse on June 24, 1948 at age 81. He was married to Mary Yale, daughter of Colonel John Wesley Yale, member of the Yale family.

Political offices
Preceded by Harry Haile Farmer	Mayor of Syracuse, NY; 1922–1925	Succeeded by Charles Hanna
