= Bethaida González =

American politician

Bethaida Carmen "Bea" Gonzalez is a Latina politician and university administrator in Syracuse, New York. She was the first Latina elected to the Syracuse School Board (1991) and Common Council (2001), and was a candidate for mayor of Syracuse, New York in 2009.

== Early life ==
González was born in Cayey, Puerto Rico in 1954 but moved with her family to central New York when she was three years old. Her migrant farmworker parents moved frequently (González estimates that she attended thirteen elementary schools), but by the time she reached middle school, González’s father had found work in construction and the family settled permanently in Syracuse. She attended Corcoran High School in Syracuse. The first member of her family to receive a high school diploma, Gonzalez received her B.A. in political science and Latin American studies from Binghamton University through the HEOP program and an MPA from Syracuse University.

== Career ==
González stayed at Binghamton for eight years as a counselor in the HEOP program. In 1984, González began working for Syracuse University as an academic advisor. She held various positions in the university’s administration including interim dean of University College (2004–2007) and dean of the University College (2007–2016).

=== Community service and politics ===
González became active in community and Latino politics in the 1980s; by the early 1990s, education had also become a priority. She participated in local committees and wards and was a member of the Association of Neighbors for Latino Advancement (ANCLA), Spanish Action League, and Latinos Concerned for Latino Advancement. In 1990, González served on the mayor’s Latino Task Force and the Minority Affairs Advisory Council for the city of Syracuse. More recently, she co-founded the Onondaga Latino Caucus.

In early 1991, González's service on the mayor's Latino Task Force drew the attention of Syracuse Mayor Thomas Young, who nominated González to the school board after the board’s president resigned. The first Hispanic to hold a citywide position, González was elected to the board later that year, becoming the first Latina elected to a citywide office in Syracuse. González served as a school board member until 1994. After a hiatus from politics to focus on raising her son, she reentered politics in July 2001 when she was selected to fill the vacant position of Syracuse Common Council president, becoming the first Latina to serve on the Common Council. González narrowly won a four-year term as council president in November 2001, and was reelected to her second and final term in 2005.

González served as Syracuse University’s vice president for community engagement from 2017 until her retirement in July 2020.

=== Candidacy for mayor of Syracuse ===
In October 2008, Gonzalez announced her candidacy for mayor of Syracuse in the 2009 election cycle. She withdrew from the race in March 2009, citing her mother's continuing health problems.

== Additional Sources ==
- Bea Gonzalez Papers, Syracuse University
- Bethaida González Papers, 1970-2002. Accn. #2003.446. Onondaga Historical Association, Syracuse, NY.
