= Charles Hanna =

American politician (1889–1942)

Charles George Hanna (1889–1942) was a politician from the United States. He was the forty-first mayor of Syracuse, New York (Republican, 1926–1929) and largely responsible for bringing air travel to the Syracuse Area. He acquired an airfield in Camillus, New York and renamed it Syracuse Municipal Airport in 1927. After World War II, the airport couldn't keep up with demand, so the city took over the former Mattydale Bomber Base and renamed it Syracuse Hancock International Airport.

Political offices
Preceded by John Henry Walrath	Mayor of Syracuse, NY; 1926–1929	Succeeded by Rolland B. Marvin
