= Louis Will =

Mayor of Syracuse, New York, from 1914 to 1916

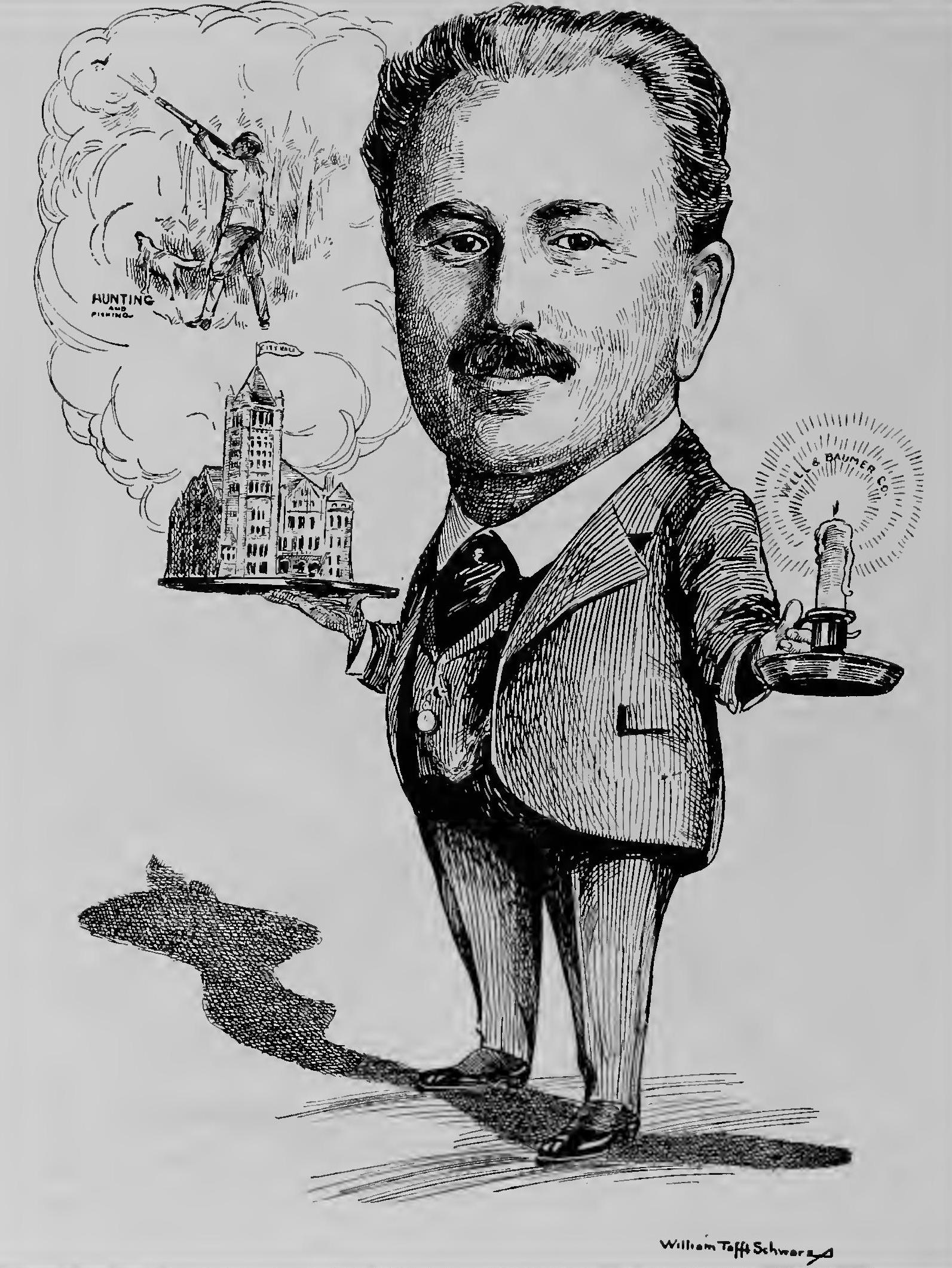
- A political cartoon of Will, c. 1915

37th Mayor of Syracuse, New York
- Preceded by: Edward Schoeneck
- Succeeded by: Walter Robinson Stone
- Constituency: Syracuse, New York

Personal details
- Born: 1857 United States
- Died: July 15, 1932 (aged 74) Syracuse, New York
- Party: Progressive Party
- Occupation: Politician

Louis Will (1857 – July 15, 1932) was an American politician who served as mayor of Syracuse, New York, from 1914 to 1916. A member of the Progressive Party, he was the last third party candidate elected mayor of Syracuse until independent Ben Walsh was elected in 2017.

== Biography ==
=== Early life and career ===
Born to German immigrants Anton and Rosina Will, he left school early after the death of his father to run the family candlemaking business, now known as Will & Baumer.

=== Mayoralty ===
Will sought the mayoralty on the Progressive Party ticket. In a year with low voter turnout, Will was elected with only 9,858 votes. It was an incredibly close three-way race, with the Republican nominee receiving 9,459 votes and the Democratic nominee receiving 9,355 votes.

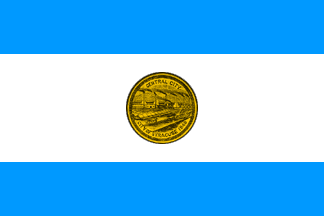
The flag of Syracuse adopted during Will's tenure

Will urged Syracuse to adopt a flag in the wake of other cities, such as San Francisco and Providence, adopting flags. After many delays and rejected designs, a flag was adopted on December 6, 1915. The Syracuse Common Council passed a resolution praising Will for the "patriotic public spirit" with which he encouraged the flag's creation. Many were left disappointed with the flag and it was described as "objectively ugly".

=== Death ===
Will died on July 15, 1932, at the age of 74.

== Legacy ==
His home, the Louis Will House, a large Queen Anne-style brick house, was listed on the National Register of Historic Places in 2009.
