= Melvin N. Zimmer =

American politician

Member of the New York State Assembly from the 120th district
- In office January 1, 1975 – July 31, 1991
- Preceded by: Rocco Pirro
- Succeeded by: Joe Nicoletti

Personal details
- Born: October 4, 1938 Syracuse, New York, U.S.
- Died: January 4, 2002 (aged 63) Syracuse, New York, U.S.
- Party: Democratic

Melvin N. Zimmer (October 4, 1938 – January 4, 2002) was an American politician who served in the New York State Assembly from the 120th district from 1975 to 1991.

He died after being hit by a motorist on January 4, 2002, in Syracuse, New York at age 63.
