= Sharon Owens =

Mayor of Syracuse, New York since 2026

55th Mayor of Syracuse
- Incumbent
- Assumed office December 31, 2025
- Preceded by: Ben Walsh

Personal details
- Born: Geneva, New York
- Party: Democratic
- Education: Syracuse University (BA)
- Website: Office website Campaign website

Sharon F. Owens is an American politician who is the 55th mayor of Syracuse, New York. A Democrat, she is the first African American mayor of Syracuse and the second female mayor of Syracuse.

== Early life and education ==
Owens was born Sharon Daniels in Geneva, New York and was a four-sport athlete at Geneva High School. She joined the Syracuse University's newly formed track and field team in the fall of 1981. At Syracuse, Owens won three Big East Conference championships in long jump and triple jump, was an Olympic qualifier, and team captain.

Owens graduated from Syracuse's Maxwell School of Citizenship and Public Affairs in 1985 with a Bachelor of Arts in Economics. During this time, she worked at the Dunbar Center, a Syracuse Southside neighborhood recreational center.

== Career ==
A democrat, Owens served as Syracuse's deputy mayor under Mayor Ben Walsh. In 2025, Walsh was term-limited and was not eligible to seek re-election to a third term; he endorsed Owens as his successor. A Democratic primary was held on June 24, 2025, and Owens prevailed.

Owens won the 2025 Syracuse mayoral election in a Landslide victory with 73.8% of the vote, defeating Republican Thomas Babilon, independent Alfonso Davis, and independent Tim Rudd. She was sworn in as the 55th mayor of the City of Syracuse on January 3, 2026, becoming the first African American and second woman to hold the office. Owens assumed office on December 31, 2025.

Political offices
Preceded by Ben Walsh	Mayor of Syracuse, NY; 2026–present	Succeeded by Incumbent
