= Syracuse Hancock International Airport =

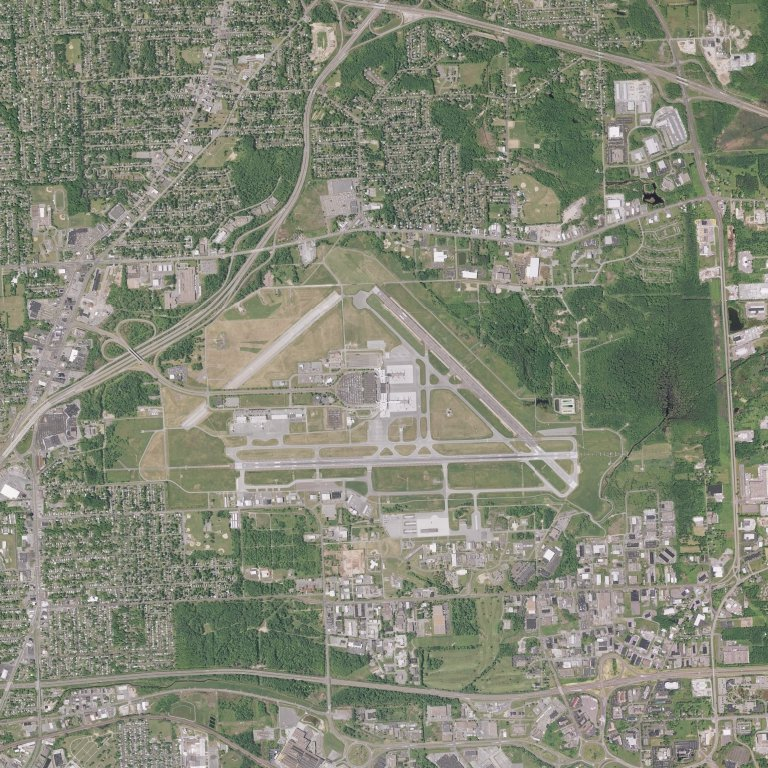
- USGS orthophoto
- IATA: SYR; ICAO: KSYR; FAA LID: SYR

Summary
- Airport type: Public / Military
- Owner: City of Syracuse
- Operator: Syracuse Regional Airport Authority
- Serves: Syracuse
- Location: Towns of DeWitt, Salina and Cicero, Onondaga County, New York, U.S.
- Elevation AMSL: 421 ft (128 m)
- Coordinates: 43°06′40″N 076°06′23″W
- Website: syrairport.org

Maps
- FAA airport diagram
- Interactive map of Syracuse Hancock International Airport

Runways
Direction	Length		Surface
Direction	ft	m	Surface
10/28	9,014	2,747	Asphalt
15/33	7,500	2,286	Asphalt

Statistics (2025)
- Aircraft operations: 36,229
- Passengers: 1,500,762 Clerk declined
- Sources: FAA, ACI.

Syracuse Hancock International Airport (IATA: SYR, ICAO: KSYR, FAA LID: SYR) is a joint civil–military airport five miles (8 km) northeast of downtown Syracuse, New York. Operated by the Syracuse Regional Airport Authority, it is located off Interstate 81, near Mattydale. The main terminal complex is at the east end of Colonel Eileen Collins Boulevard. Half of the airport is located within the Town of DeWitt, with portions within the adjacent towns of Salina and Cicero.

== History ==
In 1927, Syracuse mayor Charles Hanna felt his city needed an airport. Land in the Amboy section of the nearby town of Camillus was purchased for $50,000, and by 1928, the "Syracuse City Airport at Amboy" was handling airmail.

With the start of World War II, the airport was pressed into service as a flight training center for the Army Air Forces. By 1942, it had become apparent that Amboy Airport was not large enough to handle military needs, and as a replacement, the AAF opened Syracuse Army Air Base in the suburb of Mattydale, New York. At the end of World War II, the AAF leased the base to the city. On September 17, 1949, the Clarence E. Hancock Airport (named for the area's Congressman) opened to the public using a renovated machine shop as a terminal and replaced the airport at Amboy. The airport had three concrete runways, 5,500 feet (1,700 m) long and 300 feet (91 m) wide.

American, Buffalo, Colonial and Robinson Airlines were the first airlines to operate out of the airport. The April 1957 OAG shows 50 weekday departures: 30 on American, eight on Eastern and 12 on Mohawk. Nonstops didn't reach west past Buffalo or south past New York; Syracuse didn't get a Chicago nonstop until 1967. In the mid-1970s the airport was dominated by Mohawk's successor Allegheny Airlines, with some competition from Eastern and American.

During this time, the airport was expanded several times, becoming the second-largest airport in Upstate New York by passenger volume and the largest by number of flights. At its height, 3.17 million passengers passed through the airport.

Utica-based Empire Airlines emerged as a regional competitor to Allegheny's successor USAir by the early 1980s. Empire planned to move its headquarters to Syracuse, but these plans were cancelled when Piedmont Airlines acquired Empire in 1986. After a legal battle with the city, Piedmont agreed to maintain a hub operation at the airport and advance funds for construction of a new terminal concourse. USAir acquired Piedmont in 1989, becoming the airport's dominant carrier, but dismantled the Syracuse hub in the 1990s, leading to the closure of several gates.

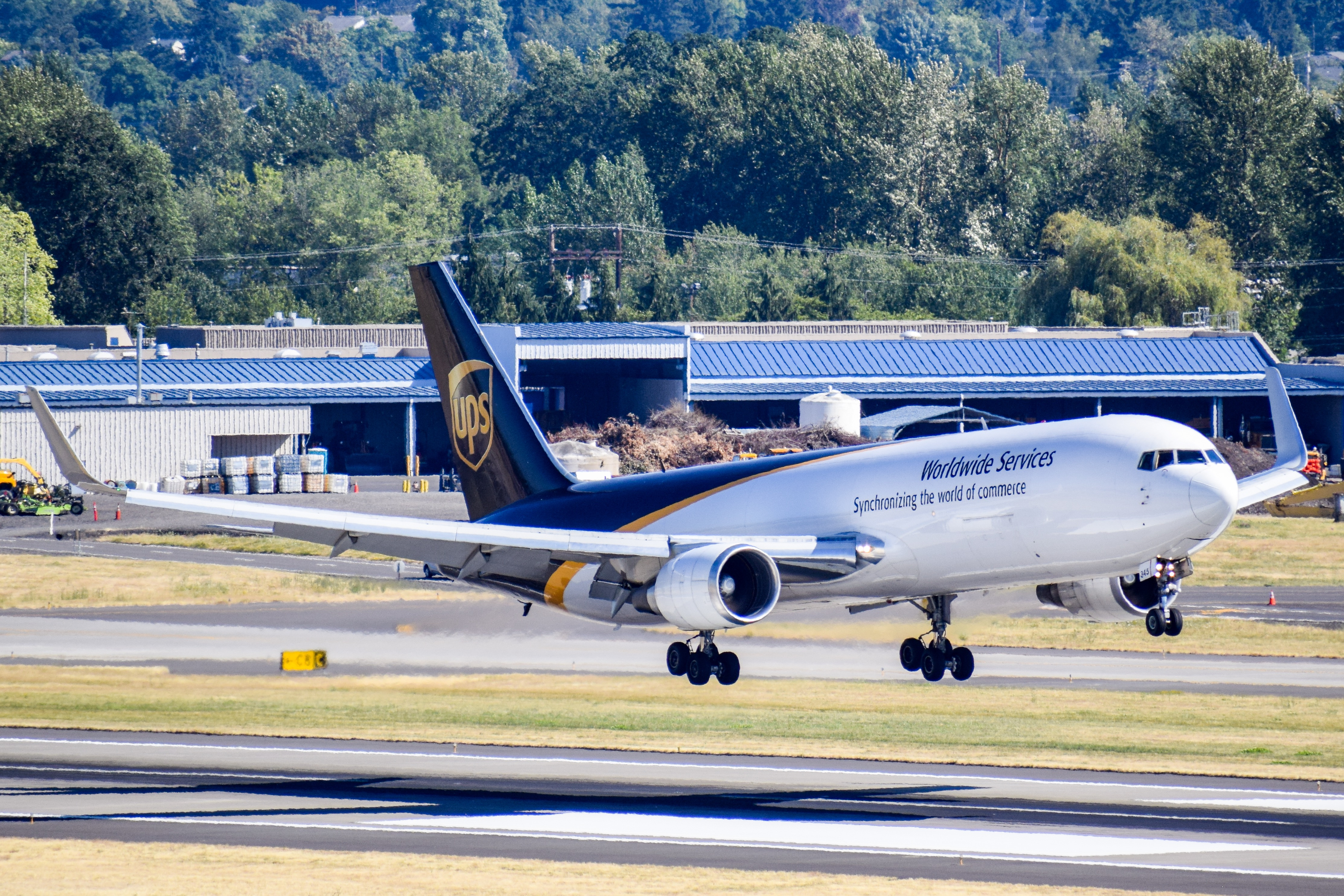
UPS Boeing 767-300ERF.

The largest aircraft ever to visit Syracuse was an Antonov Airlines AN-124, which flew a cargo flight from Vienna in 1996. A British Airways Concorde made a scheduled landing at the airport on September 27, 1986.

=== 21st century ===
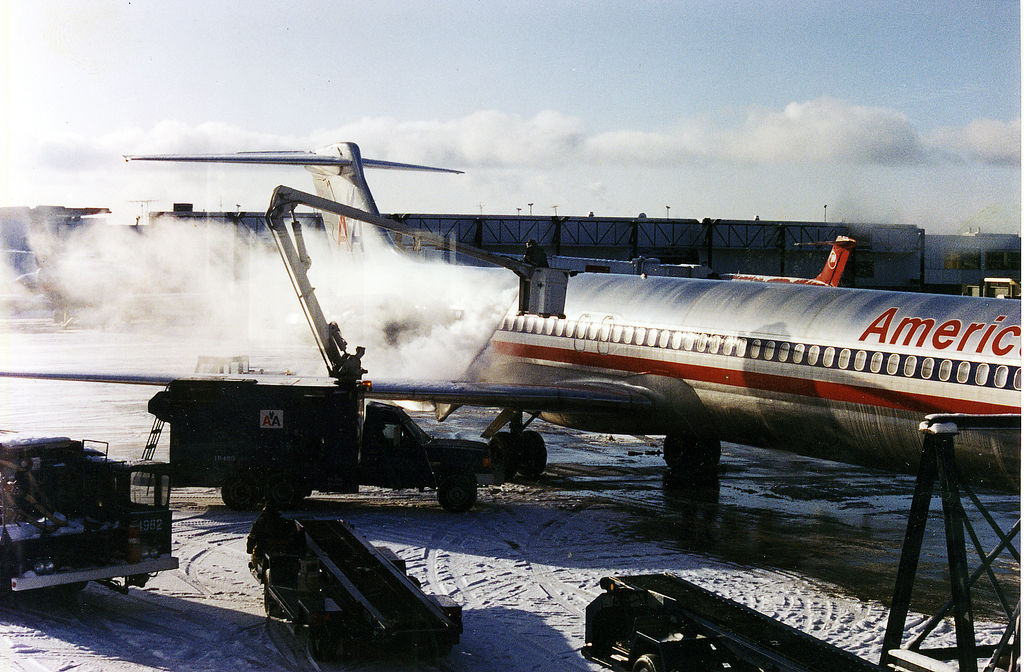
An American Airlines McDonnell Douglas MD-80 being de-iced at Terminal B. In the background is a Northwest Airlines DC-9 parked at Terminal A.

In 2013, the airport's two concourses were connected airside along with the opening of a new centralized security checkpoint.

In November 2018, $62 million renovation efforts were completed on Syracuse's terminal. Renovations included larger windows and higher ceilings allowing more natural light, a brand-new flight museum highlighting the history of aviation both locally and globally, renovated passenger bridges connecting the terminal to the parking garage, as well as more "modern" airline check-in areas. The project took approximately eight months to complete.

Southwest Airlines entered the Syracuse market for the first time in 2021 after the airport waived $1.5 million in fees and provided $150,000 in marketing assistance. Syracuse had been the only major upstate New York airport not served by Southwest. Southwest ended service at Syracuse on August 4, 2024, due to aircraft delivery delays.

On March 8, 2022, Breeze Airways began serving the airport.

On June 10, 2022, the airport announced intentions to create its own police department. Previously, the Syracuse Police Department provided police services to the airport with off-duty officers. The new police department began operations on March 6, 2023.

An Escape Lounge opened in June 2023.

While Syracuse has had commercial service to Canada at various times—most recently in October 2018—it does not currently have any scheduled international service.

As of 2022, the airport had several projects in planning or construction. Parking, which has reached capacity during recent peak travel times, is being expanded with new lots and a rebuild of the parking garage into two new garages. Car rental facilities are to be moved from the terminal and parking garage to a new consolidated rental car facility and ground transportation center.

The airport's terminal and its two concourses have seen recent additions of new jet bridges and/or terminal bump outs for hold rooms at Gate 22, 27, 11, and 14. A new U.S. Customs and Border Protection facility has been built in the location of Gate 15 to replace a smaller, outdated one in the Gate 14 area.

== Facilities ==
The airport covers 2,000 acres (809 ha) at an elevation of 421 feet (128 m). It has two asphalt runways: 10/28 is 9,014 by 150 feet (2,744 × 46 m) and 15/33 is 7,500 by 150 feet (2,286 × 46 m).

The east–west instrument runway (10-28) was extended from its original 5,500 feet by the mid-1950s to 6,863 feet and about 1958 to 8,000 feet. In 1958 the instrument landing system to runway 28 was augmented with a 3,000-foot high-intensity-approach lighting system. With the use of the Century series fighter aircraft by the Air Force, around 1960 the main east–west runway was extended again, to 9,005 feet. The runway was strengthened in the early 1960s for the heavier Boeing 707. In the 1960s runway centerline lighting was added to the main runway and touchdown zone lighting on the runway 28 end. In the summer months of 2020, the east–west runway 10-28 was resurfaced except for the end of 10 which includes the touchdown zone of 28, as this portion intersects runway 15/33 and would make construction difficult due to air traffic. Also in early 2020, high-speed taxiways in the mid-section of runway 10-28 were removed between taxiway A and the main runway; taxiway C was taken away and the portions of taxiways B and F were removed between taxiway A and the main runway. Two new taxiways were constructed - taxiway U was added as a right-angle taxiway east of where the high-speed exit taxiways used to be (between the main runway and taxiway A) allowing access to taxiway J on the opposite side of the runway. Another taxiway, labelled as taxiway Z, almost (but not quite) at a right angle to the runway, was constructed between runway 10-28 and taxiway A slightly west of where the high-speed exit taxiways used to be. Taxiway U also allows aircraft to cross over to taxiway J on the south side of the airport. During the same time frame, the main runway was extended very slightly to 9,014 feet (2,747 meters).

Around the time of building the new terminal building, runway 6-24 was shortened to 3,261 feet (to make room for the entrance road to the new terminal) and continued to be a general aviation runway into the 1970s and was later abandoned. Runway 14-32 was lengthened in the 1960s to 6,000 feet. Another extension brought it to 6,480 feet and sometime around 1980 to its present length of 7,500 feet. The crosswind runway was renumbered from 14–32 to 15–33. An instrument landing system was added to runway 10 with medium-intensity-approach lighting with runway alignment indicator lights. Runway 15 got a medium-intensity-approach lighting system.

The airport has a cargo facility served by Fedex Express and UPS.

=== Ground transportation ===
Taxis and ride-hailing services use pick-up areas outside of both terminals' baggage claim areas.

Centro, the local public transportation provider, provides local bus service to the airport, operating Monday through Saturday.

OurBus and Trailways serve the airport with several daily trips, connecting to regional cities such as Ithaca and Watertown. All buses use the pick-up area near Terminal A's baggage claim.

== Operations ==
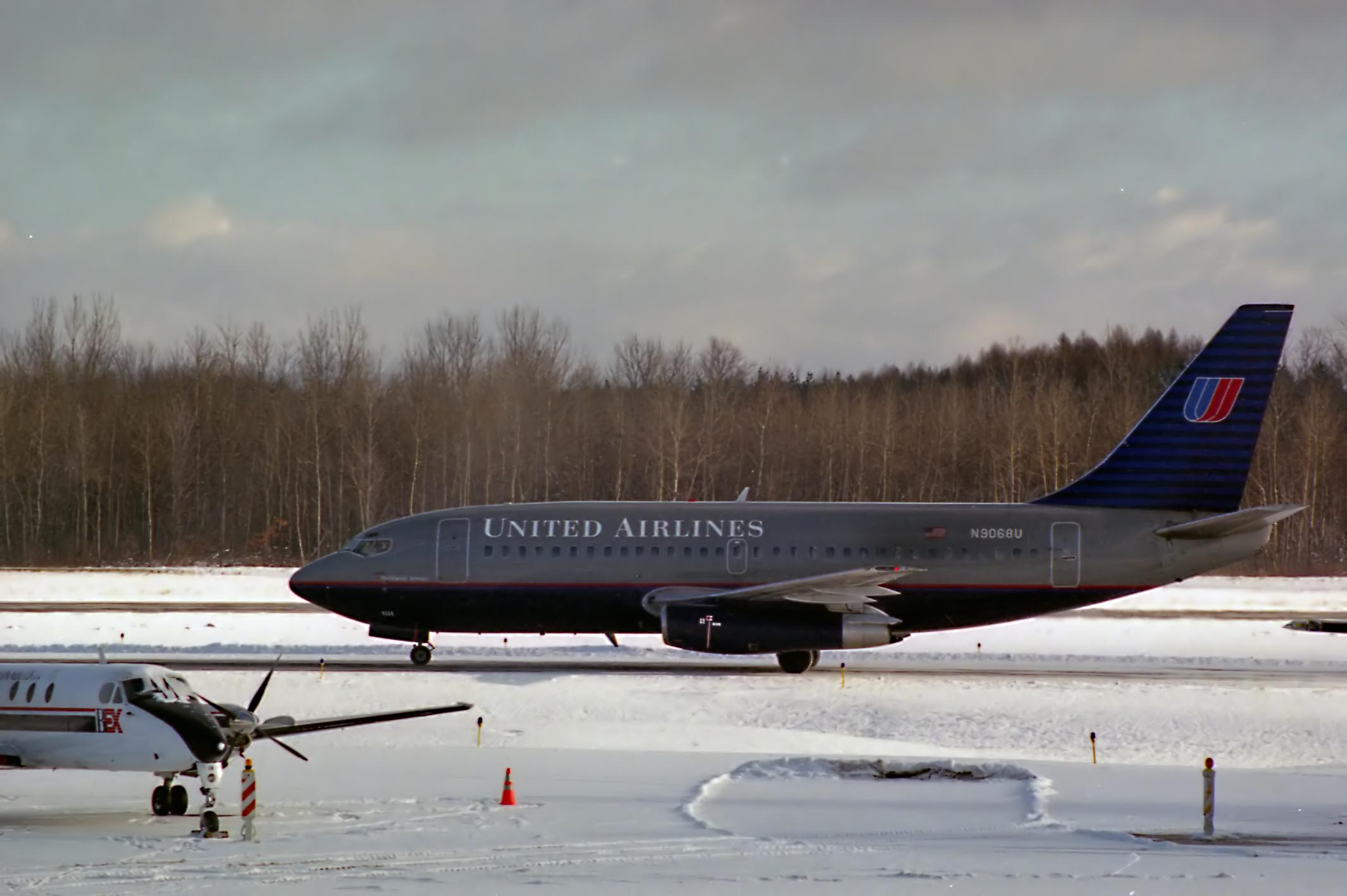
United Airlines Boeing 737-200 at Syracuse Airport in 1993 with a Business Express Airlines Beechcraft 1900C in the foreground.

Syracuse receives an average of 124 inches (3,100 mm) of snow annually, most of any major city in the United States. On average, the airport is closed less than 24 hours annually due to snowfall. The airport has received the Balchen/Post Award for Excellence in the Performance of Snow and Ice Control over eight times, most recently in 2018–19. Runway 28 allows for Category II instrument landing system (ILS).

The co-located Hancock Field Air National Guard Base's fire department provides Aircraft Rescue and Fire Fighting (ARFF), structural Fire/Rescue, and Emergency Services to the National Guard Base as well as the civilian Syracuse Hancock International Airport.

== Airlines and destinations ==
=== Passenger ===
Airlines	Destinations	Refs
Allegiant Air	Fort Lauderdale, Nashville, Orlando/Sanford, Sarasota, St. Petersburg/Clearwater; Seasonal: Myrtle Beach, Punta Gorda (FL)	
American Airlines	Charlotte, Dallas/Fort Worth; Seasonal: Washington–National	
American Eagle	Boston, Chicago–O'Hare, Philadelphia, Washington–National; Seasonal: Miami	
Breeze Airways	Charleston (SC), Fort Myers, Las Vegas, Myrtle Beach (begins May 27, 2027), Raleigh/Durham, Tampa	
Delta Air Lines	Atlanta, Detroit; Seasonal: Minneapolis/St. Paul	
Delta Connection	Detroit, New York–JFK, New York–LaGuardia	
JetBlue	Boston, Fort Lauderdale, New York–JFK, Orlando	
Sun Country Airlines	Seasonal: Minneapolis/St. Paul	
United Airlines	Chicago–O'Hare, Denver	
United Express	Chicago–O'Hare, Washington–Dulles	

Passenger destinations map
Domestic destinations from Syracuse Hancock International Airport
Red = Year-round destination
Green = Seasonal destination

== Statistics ==
=== Top destinations ===
Busiest domestic routes from SYR (December 2024 – November 2025)
Rank	City	Passengers	Carriers
1	Chicago–O'Hare, Illinois	169,560	American, United
2	(Georgia (U.S. state)) Atlanta, Georgia	160,310	Delta, Frontier
3	Charlotte, North Carolina	139,860	American
4	Orlando, Florida	112,460	Frontier, JetBlue
5	(New York (state)) New York–JFK, New York	109,830	Delta, JetBlue
6	Detroit, Michigan	104,400	Delta
7	Washington–National, Virginia	64,520	American
8	Denver, Colorado	62,760	United
9	Washington–Dulles, Virginia	58,750	United
10	(New York (state)) New York–LGA, New York	54,980	Delta

=== Annual traffic ===
Annual passenger traffic (enplaned) at SYR, 2001 through 2025
Year	Passengers	Year	Passengers	Year	Passengers
2001	953,011	2013	1,000,466	2025	1,500,762
2002	953,935	2014	998,900	2026	
2003	954,930	2015	1,000,722	2027	
2004	1,135,713	2016	999,158	2028	
2005	1,228,991	2017	1,038,308	2029	
2006	1,133,040	2018	1,156,458	2030	
2007	1,184,162	2019	1,293,353	2031	
2008	1,116,584	2020	445,213	2032	
2009	1,024,227	2021	852,641	2033	
2010	1,035,916	2022	1,265,843	2034	
2011	999,880	2023	1,430,563	2035	
2012	988,347	2024	1,513,373	2036	

=== Airline market share ===
Largest airlines at SYR (December 2024 – November 2025)
Rank	Airline	Passengers	Share
1	American Airlines	399,000	14.14%
2	Delta Air Lines	391,000	13.86%
3	JetBlue Airways	312,000	11.07%
4	Endeavor Air (operating as Delta Connection)	298,000	10.58%
5	United Airlines	247,000	8.75%
	Other	1,172,000	41.58%

== Flight schools ==
Syracuse Hancock International is home to Syracuse Flight School, formerly known as Waypoint Flight School.

The Syracuse Flying Club, based out of the MillionAir FBO, offers flight training.

== See also ==
- Hancock Field Air National Guard Base
- Syracuse Suburban Airport
- Syracuse Municipal Airport
