= Joe Nicoletti =

American politician

Joseph A. Nicoletti is an American politician and business person.

He is a graduate of Henninger High School in Syracuse, New York, and of the Maxwell School of Citizenship and Public Affairs at Syracuse University. He entered politics as a Democrat, and was a member of the Syracuse City Council.

In November 1991, he was elected to the New York State Assembly (120th D.) to fill the vacancy caused by the resignation of Melvin N. Zimmer. He was re-elected in November 1992, and remained in the Assembly until 1994, sitting in the 189th and 190th New York State Legislatures. In November 1994, he ran for re-election but was defeated by Republican Bernard J. Mahoney. Overall in his career, Nicoletti has run unsuccessfully for mayor on four occasions as both Republican and Democrat.

He resides on the North Side of Syracuse.

New York State Assembly
Preceded by Melvin N. Zimmer	New York State Assembly; 120th District; 1991–1994	Succeeded by Bernard J. Mahoney
