= Cicero, New York =

Town in New York, United States

- Town
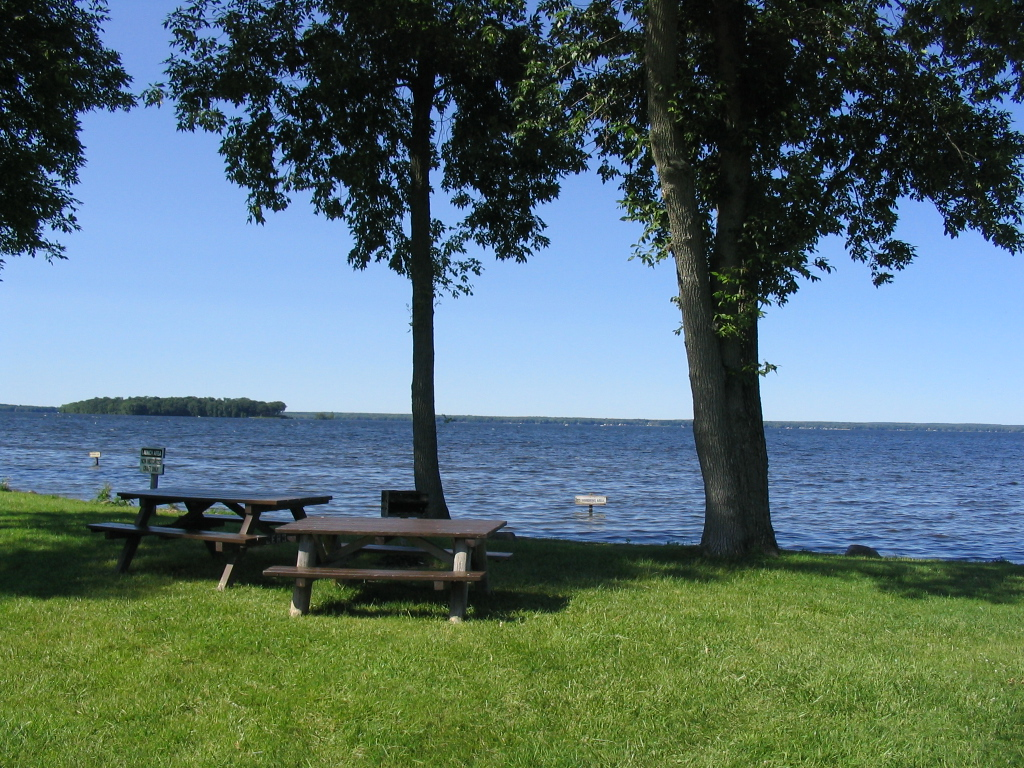
- Oneida Lake from Williams Park in Cicero.

- Location in Onondaga County and the state of New York.
- Coordinates: 43°8′5″N 76°7′49″W
- Country: United States
- State: New York
- County: Onondaga

Government
  - Type: Town Council
  - Town Supervisor: Rob Santucci
  - Town Council: Members' List: • Nancy White (R); • Michael Mirizio (R); • Michael Becallo (R); • Jonathan Karp (R)

Area
  - Total: 48.46 sq mi (125.52 km^{2})
  - Land: 48.28 sq mi (125.04 km^{2})
  - Water: 0.19 sq mi (0.48 km^{2})
- Elevation: 413 ft (126 m)

Population (2020)
  - Total: 31,435
  - Density: 651.12/sq mi (251.40/km^{2})
- Time zone: UTC-5 (Eastern (EST))
  - Summer (DST): UTC-4 (EDT)
- ZIP Codes: 13039 (Cicero); 13029 (Brewerton); 13030 (Bridgeport); 13212 (North Syracuse); 13057 (East Syracuse); 13082 (Kirkville)
- Area code: 315
- FIPS code: 36-15704
- GNIS feature ID: 0978826
- Website: ciceronewyork.net

Cicero is a town in northern Onondaga County, New York, United States. As of the 2020 Census, the population was 31,435. The name of the town was assigned by a clerk interested in the classics, honoring Cicero, a Roman statesman.

The Town of Cicero is in the central part of New York and a suburb of Syracuse in the northeastern section of Onondaga County.

== History ==
Cicero was one of the townships of the former Central New York Military Tract, land reserved for soldiers of the American Revolution.

The Town of Cicero was formed in 1790 as a Township in the Military Tract, but was part of the Town of Lysander when Onondaga County was formed in 1794 and was separated from Lysander in 1807. The first settler to arrive was John Leach, who established a tavern at Cody's Corners.

In 1827 the town was split approximately in half, with the western portion of Cicero becoming the Town of Clay.

The Stone Arabia School was listed on the National Register of Historic Places in 2007.

== Geography ==
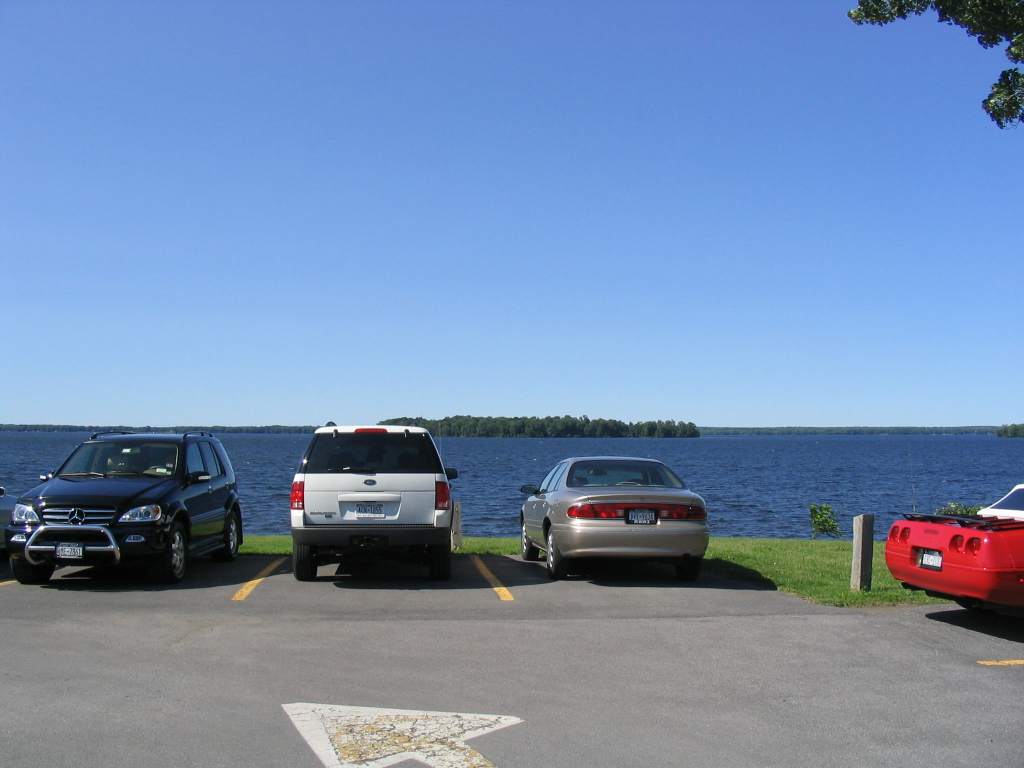
Oneida Lake taken from the Yacht Club in Cicero. Two small islands in the lake can be seen from this shoreline.

According to the United States Census Bureau, the town has a total area of 48.5 square miles (126 km^{2}), of which 48.5 square miles (126 km^{2}) is land and 0.1 square miles (0.26 km^{2}) (0.10%) is water.

The northern town line of Cicero, marked by the Oneida River, is the border of Oswego County. The eastern town boundary is the border of Madison County, marked by the Chittenango Creek.

At the northern border of Cicero is Oneida Lake, one of the largest bodies of water located within New York State. Also within Cicero is a fairly large swamp named Cicero Swamp. Cicero consists of mainly wetland, forests, farms and a large and growing number of housing developments encroaching on farmland. The soils are mostly brown silt loams and loams with slight to moderate acidity in surface layers (subsoils may be somewhat alkaline); their drainage varies.

U.S. Route 11, Interstate 81, and New York State Route 31 pass through Cicero. New York State Route 298 intersects NY-31 near the eastern town line. Michael Airfield, a single runway general aviation airport, is located within Cicero.

The reconstructed Erie Canal follows the Oneida River along the northern town line.

== Demographics ==
Historical population
Census	Pop.	Note	%±
1820	1,303		—
1830	1,808		38.8%
1840	2,464		36.3%
1850	2,980		20.9%
1860	3,277		10.0%
1870	2,902		−11.4%
1880	2,934		1.1%
1890	2,636		−10.2%
1900	2,611		−0.9%
1910	2,475		−5.2%
1920	2,536		2.5%
1930	3,684		45.3%
1940	4,346		18.0%
1950	5,956		37.0%
1960	14,725		147.2%
1970	22,539		53.1%
1980	23,648		4.9%
1990	25,560		8.1%
2000	27,982		9.5%
2010	31,682		13.2%
2020	31,435		−0.8%
U.S. Decennial Census

As of the census of 2000, there were 27,982 people, 10,538 households, and 7,692 families residing in the town. The population density was 577.4 inhabitants per square mile (222.9/km^{2}). There were 11,033 housing units at an average density of 227.7 per square mile (87.9/km^{2}). The racial makeup of the town was 96.31% White, 1.19% African American, 0.38% Native American, 0.71% Asian, 0.02% Pacific Islander, 0.22% from other races, and 1.17% from two or more races. Hispanic or Latino of any race were 0.88% of the population.

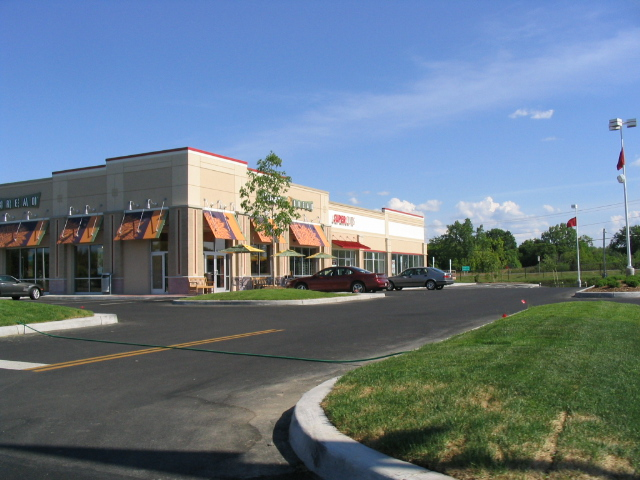
Cicero is currently undergoing a retail renaissance. Old run-down properties are redeveloped into new retail plazas like this one called The Marketplace.

There were 10,538 households, out of which 38.7% had children under the age of 18 living with them, 58.9% were married couples living together, 10.1% had a female householder with no husband present, and 27.0% were non-families. 21.3% of all households were made up of individuals, and 8.3% had someone living alone who was 65 years of age or older. The average household size was 2.65 and the average family size was 3.10.

In the town, the population was spread out, with 28.1% under the age of 18, 5.9% from 18 to 24, 33.2% from 25 to 44, 22.1% from 45 to 64, and 10.7% who were 65 years of age or older. The median age was 36 years. For every 100 females, there were 96.5 males. For every 100 females age 18 and over, there were 93.6 males.

The median income for a household in the town was $50,055, and the median income for a family was $57,531. Males had a median income of $41,038 versus $26,983 for females. The per capita income for the town was $21,527. About 3.9% of families and 5.1% of the population were below the poverty line, including 6.0% of those under age 18 and 3.5% of those age 65 or over.

== Communities and locations within Cicero ==
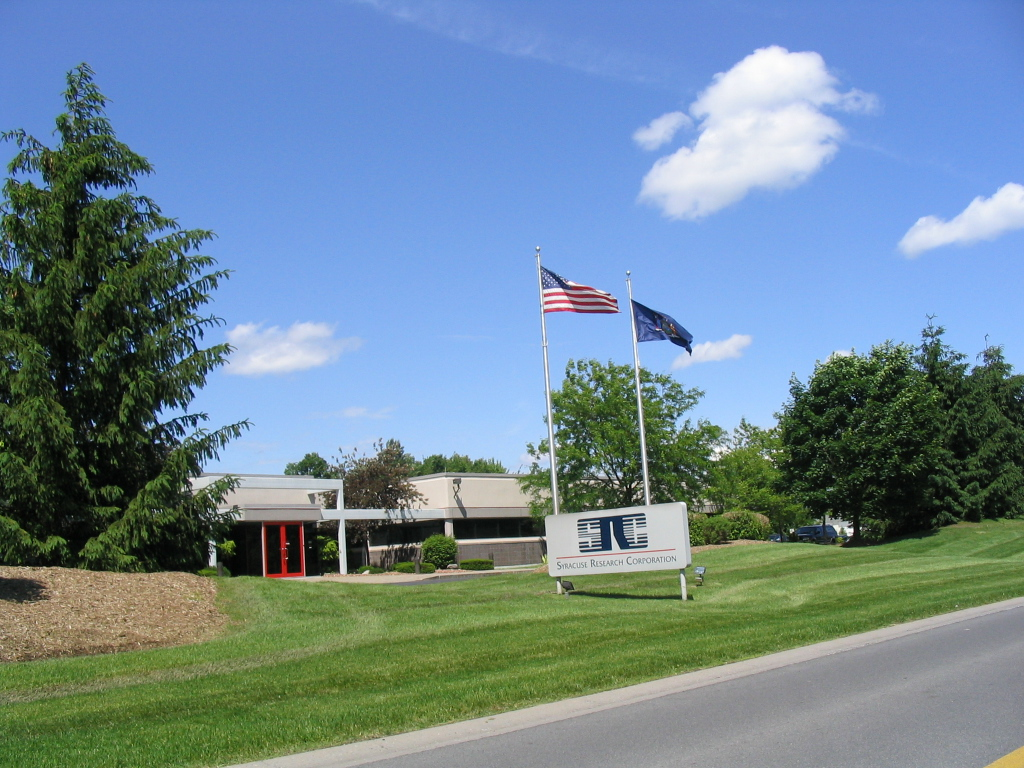
Syracuse Research Corporation Headquarters is located in Cicero.

- Bay Colony – This neighborhood features a combination of newer and established high-end homes. Located near the South Bay of Oneida Lake, many properties overlook the golf course at the adjacent Lakeshore Country Club.
- Boyson Bay – A bay of Oneida Lake west of Kraus Landing.
- Brewerton – A hamlet near the northern town line on US Route 11, by Interstate 81.
- Bridgeport – A hamlet. It is also located in Madison County.
- Brown Center – A hamlet south of Cicero Center.
- Cedar Point – A fairly large subdivision located north of Lakeshore Road, and south of McKinley Road.
- Cicero – The hamlet of Cicero is in the southwestern part of the town on US Route 11 near Interstate 81.
- Cicero Center – A hamlet on NY-31 in the eastern part of the town.
- Cicero Swamp Wildlife Management Area – A conservation area in the southeastern part of Cicero.
- Ciceroville – originally a hamlet, now a historical location.
- Darby Farms – A location in the southwestern part of the town by Interstate 81, one of the oldest subdivisions in Cicero
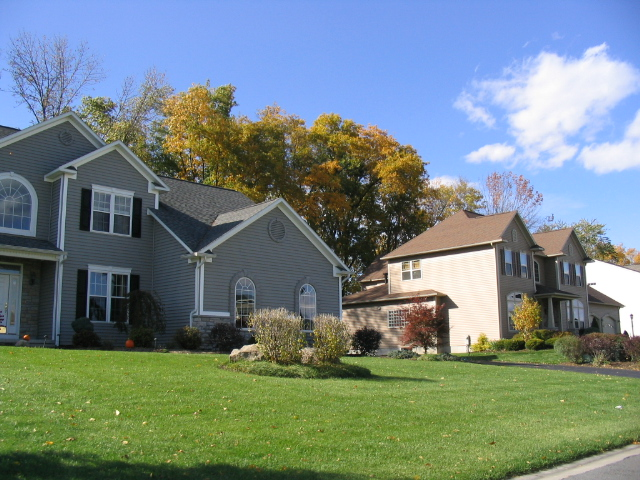
  Picture of a typical residential neighborhood in Cicero.
- Eldan Meadows - A subdivision between South Bay Rd, Button Rd, and Lakeshore Rd.
- Forest Beach – A hamlet on the shore of Oneida Lake east of Brewerton.
- Gulfstream - A subdivision between Weaver Rd, Mud Mill Rd, and Lakeshore Rd
- Harbour Village – A location by the eastern town line on NY-31.
- Henryk Woods – A small subdivision on the east side of Thompson Road across from the Bragman estate.
- Hiller Heights – A housing development in the southwestern part of the town near Interstate 81.
- John's Landing – A small subdivision located on the northern side of the town near Snowshoe Trail.
- Kraus Landing – A hamlet on the shore of Oneida Lake, north of Cicero Center.
- Laurelwood – A neighborhood off South Bay that is across from Gillette Road Middle School.
- Long Point – A short, narrow peninsula south of Forest Beach.
- Lower South Bay – A hamlet on the shore of Oneida Lake on the southern shore of a small bay also called Lower South Bay.
- Maple Bay – A bay of Oneida Lake east of Kraus Landing.
- Muskrat Bay – A small bay north of Sandy Bay village.
- Mystic Woods – A subdivision on the western side of Thompson Road. Average home price in this neighborhood is $200,000, and the neighborhood has a mix of new/old construction.
- North Syracuse – The Village of North Syracuse is partly in the town at the western town line.
- Oneida Park – A location by the eastern town line on NY-298.
- Renee Gardens – A small subdivision located on the northern side of the town near Persian Terrace.
- Syracuse Hancock International Airport – A small, northern part of the airport is at the southern town line.
- The Crossings – An upscale neighborhood that played host to the 2006 Parade of Homes.
- The Pastures – Another upscale neighborhood that featured the Parade of Homes in 2002.
- Valentine's Beach – A hamlet on the shore of Oneida Lake north of Cicero Center.
- Lyon’s Runne- An upscale neighborhood near Oneida Lake. First homes built in the late 2000s with new development continuing through 2022.
- Wallington Meadows – A small neighborhood located just off Lakeshore Road. It is less than one mile from Oneida Lake and is currently undergoing an expansion project.

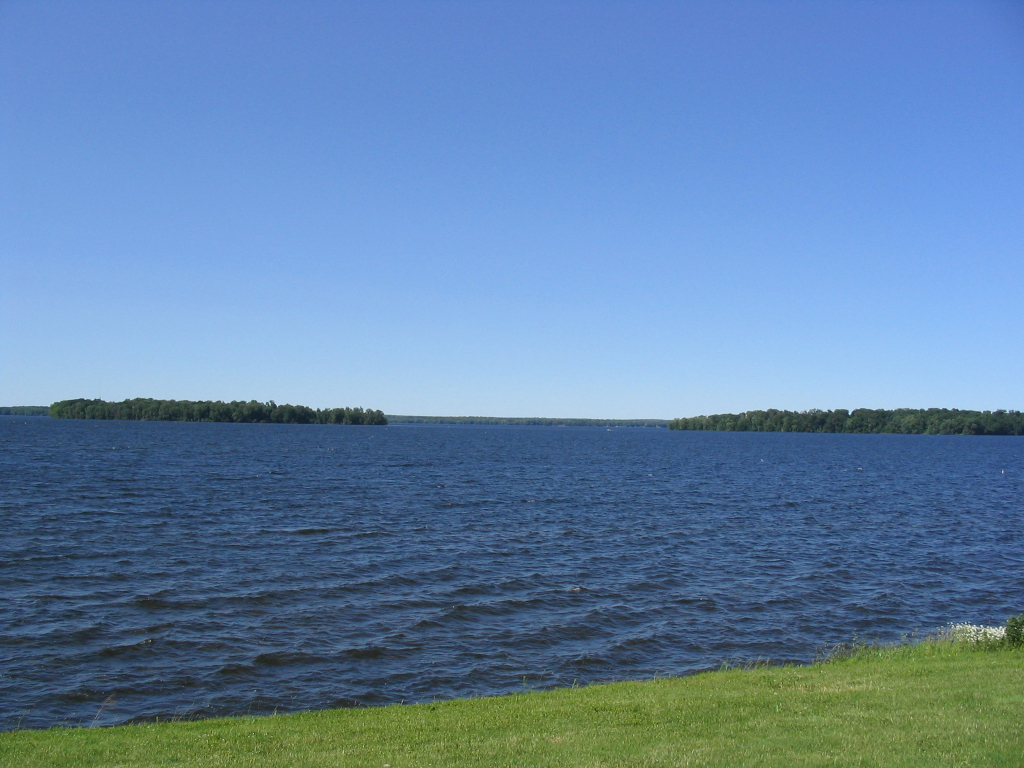
This picture was taken from the Cicero Yacht Club parking lot. Two islands can be seen. Frenchman Island on the left and Dunham Island on the right.
