= Louis Will House =

Historic house in New York, United States

- U.S. National Register of Historic Places
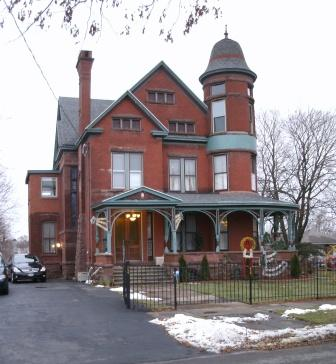

- Location within New York Location within the United States
- Interactive map showing Louis Will’s House location
- Location: 714 N. McBride St., Syracuse, New York
- Coordinates: 43°3′27.96″N 76°8′48.49″W
- NRHP reference No.: 09000909
- Added to NRHP: November 10, 2009

The Louis Will House is a "high-style" Queen Anne style house at 714 N. McBride St. in Syracuse, New York. It was listed on the National Register of Historic Places on November 10, 2009. It is currently a private residence.Today, it remains listed and a private residence.

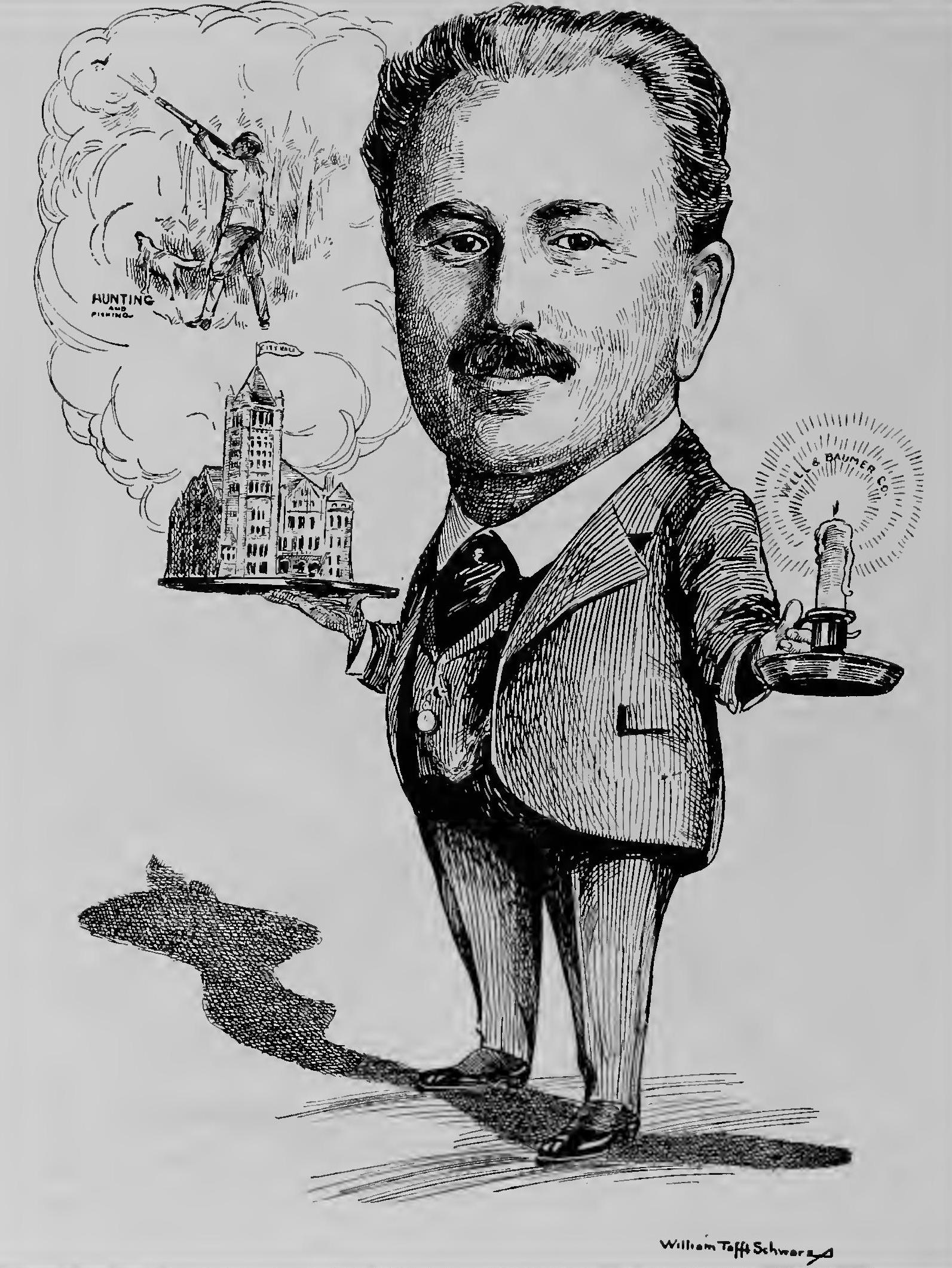
Mayor Louis Will, 1915 caricature

It was the home of Louis Will, Progressive Party mayor of Syracuse during 1914–16. He was owner of a candle-making business.

The exterior of the house is built of brick on a sandstone foundation. Terra-cotta features decorate various parts of the house. A porch with turned wood elements wraps from the west facing front of the house around the south side. The most significant feature of the house is its stained glass windows, which are believed to be early works of the Tiffany studios in New York City.

Oddly, the architect is unknown, despite original plans for the house being available.

It faces on McBride Park and stands out as the pre-eminent home of the area.Over time McBride Park was taken over by New York's developing street grid
