= Ben Walsh =

New York politician (born 1979)

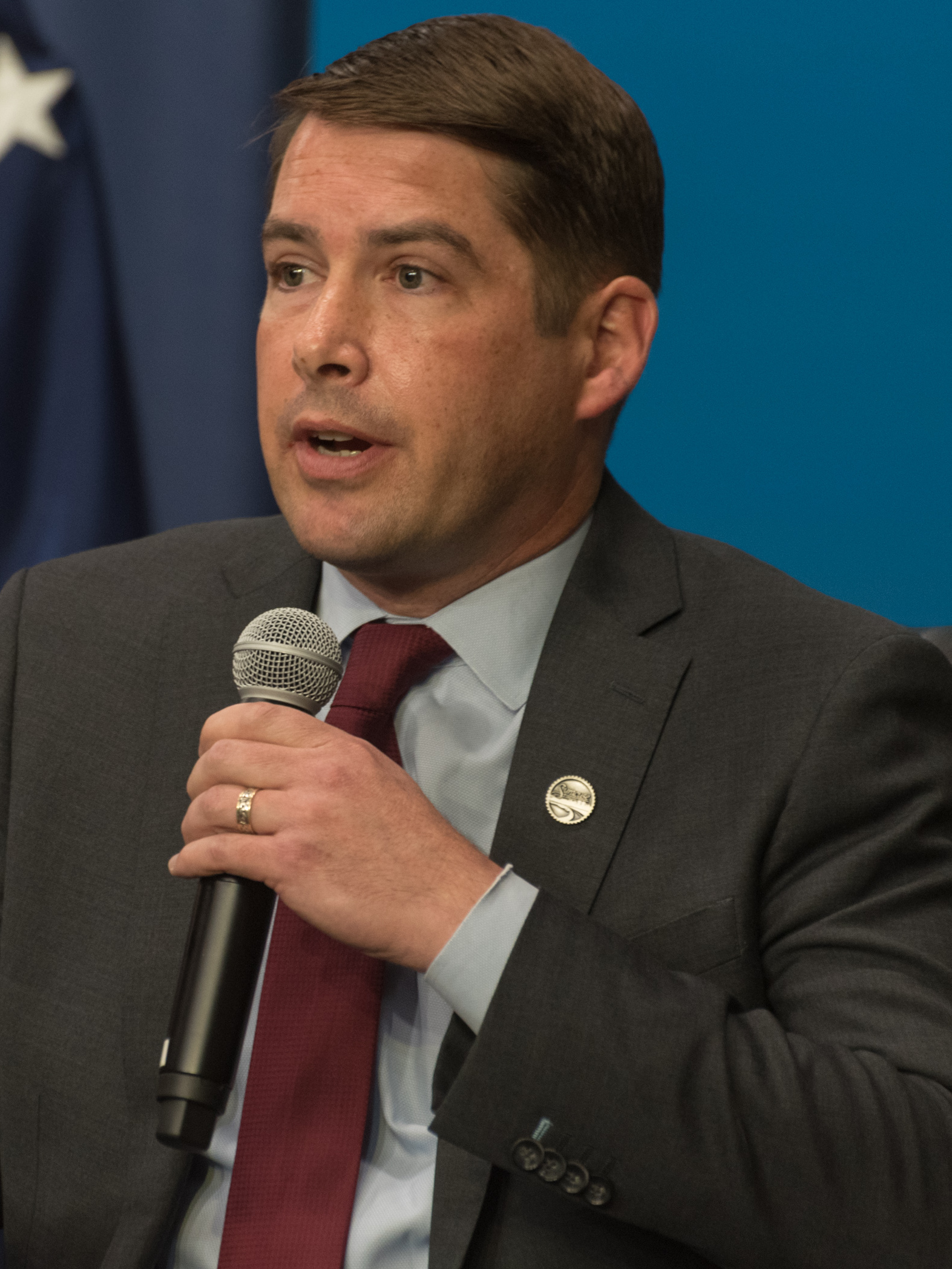
- Walsh in 2022

54th Mayor of Syracuse
- In office January 6, 2018 – December 31, 2025
- Preceded by: Stephanie Miner
- Succeeded by: Sharon Owens

Personal details
- Born: Benjamin Walsh
- Party: Independent
- Other political affiliations: Independence; Reform
- Relatives: William F. Walsh (grandfather); James T. Walsh (father)
- Education: Ithaca College (BA); Syracuse University (MPA)

Benjamin R. Walsh is an American politician who served as the 54th Mayor of Syracuse, New York from 2018 to 2025. An independent, Walsh is the first person to be elected mayor of Syracuse without major party support since Louis Will in 1913.

== Early life and education ==
Walsh is the son of former congressman James T. "Jim" Walsh and the grandson of former congressman and Syracuse mayor William F. Walsh, both of whom represented Central New York as Republicans.

Walsh grew up as one of three children in the Strathmore neighborhood. He graduated from Westhill High School in 1997. Walsh attended Ithaca College and graduated with a B.A. in Political Science. He also received a Master's degree in Public Administration from the Maxwell School of Citizenship and Public Affairs at Syracuse University in 2005.

== Career ==
Walsh began his policy career working for Laborers Local 633 on construction jobs around Onondaga Lake. Later, he worked for the political actions staff of the American Federation of Labor and Congress of Industrial Organizations in Albany. In 2002, Walsh returned to Syracuse to run his father's congressional campaign. Following his father's campaign, Walsh traveled to Ireland, where he stayed for three months and interned for then Prime Minister of Ireland Bertie Ahern.

Walsh eventually returned to Syracuse to work for SUNY College of Environmental Science and Forestry, educating municipalities about brownfields. He went on to become the deputy commissioner of the city's Department of Neighborhood and Business Development under previous mayor Stephanie Miner. Here, Walsh created the Greater Syracuse Land Bank and was part of the redevelopment of Hotel Syracuse. He also worked on the Metropolitan Development Association, a precursor to CenterState CEO. Additionally, Walsh served on several boards and community groups around Syracuse, including serving as president of the Gifford Foundation board.

After resigning from his position at city hall in 2015, Walsh worked for Mackenzie Hughes law firm as Business Development Directo prior to launching his campaign to become the mayor of Syracuse.

== Mayor of Syracuse ==
Walsh was elected mayor of Syracuse in 2017 while running as the candidate of two minor parties: The Independence Party of New York and the Reform Party of New York State. In what was generally seen as an upset, he received 53.2% of the vote and defeated Democratic frontrunner Juanita Perez Williams as well as the nominees of the Republican, Green, and Working Families parties. Walsh is the first person to be elected mayor of Syracuse without major party support since Louis Will in 1913. As of 2017, Walsh had never enrolled in a political party.

Walsh was sworn in as the 54th mayor of Syracuse on January 6, 2018. He sought re-election in 2021 on the Independence Party line and won the election by a comfortable margin. He served two terms as mayor and was unable to seek a third due to term limits. As of June 2025, he remained a political independent. He left office on December 31, 2025 and was succeeded by Deputy Mayor Sharon Owens, who received his endorsement in the 2025 election.

=== Policy plans ===
In January 2019, Walsh introduced his major policy plan, Syracuse Surge, at that year's State of the City. The goal of the plan was to modernize Syracuse's economy and prepare it for equitable access to new technology (as anticipated in projections in the Fourth Industrial Revolution) through both public and private investment.

The mayor's plans have included establishing a science, technology, engineering, arts and math (STEAM) school at the old Central Technical High School and was expected to open in Fall 2022.

In January 2020, Walsh announced the Resurgent Neighborhood Initiative (RNI), a plan for housing and economic development focused on ten neighborhoods and business corridors throughout Syracuse.

=== Police reform ===
Walsh made an executive order regarding police reform. The executive order included the enactment of the Right to Know law which requires officers to give their name, rank and reason for stopping someone during every interaction with the public. The officers are required to leave their information if no arrest is made. Additionally, the executive order includes equipping each patrol car with a dashboard camera, securing more body-worn cameras for patrol officers and new training guidelines such as education on the history of racism in Syracuse and the United States, among other things.

=== Mayor's Office to Reduce Gun Violence ===
Walsh's administration created the Mayor's Office to Reduce Gun Violence, tasked with conducting a Syracuse Violent Crime Assessment and recommending interventions for its Community Violence Intervention Plan.

==== Appointment of Lateef Johnson-Kinsey ====
On April 1, 2022, Walsh appointed Lateef Johnson-Kinsey, a pastor at The Well of Hope Church, as director of The Mayor's Office to Reduce Gun Violence. Johnson-Kinsey is the executive director of Transforming Lives & Community and was previously the Dean of Students at Syracuse Academy of Science.

==== The Safer Streets Program ====
On March 7, 2023, the Walsh administration announced The Safer Streets Program, a $1 million proposal from The Mayor's Office to Reduce Gun Violence and Lateef Johnson-Kinsey recommending paying known gang members a weekly $100-$200 stipend not to commit violent crime and to attend training, therapy and career coaching. The program uses federal funds from the Biden administration's American Rescue Plan.

Johnson-Kinsey claimed that his office found that the gangs were not fighting over drugs or money but over feuds and personal disputes.

==== Controversy over stipend program ====
The Safer Streets Program proposed stipends to alleviate poverty for 50 of the city's most at-risk individuals between the ages of 18 and 24, many of whom had criminal records and gang affiliations. The payments were designed to help gang members with basic expenses and were available if they avoid violent criminal behavior and participate in other program initiatives.

Syracuse Police Benevolent Association President Joseph Moran said, "You're actually paying stipends to individuals who are documented gang members to maintain good behavior and obey the law. It really was a surprise to us to see that. I know it doesn't sit well with the membership. It really doesn't sit well with myself."

In a Post-Standard letter to the editor, 2nd District City Councilor and Democrat Pat Hogan wrote the following: "There is no doubt that the city of Syracuse ... has a gang problem.... We need to aggressively use every means at our disposal to stop this violence. Paying gang members is not the answer.... I will never support paying stipends to gang members who are still engaged in criminal activity."

=== Grants ===
The city of Syracuse was awarded a $500,000 grant in the beginning of 2019 by the New York Power Authority to buy and replace all of the city's streetlights with energy-efficient lightbulbs. The Walsh administration said the purchase was estimated to save the city $3 million per year and reduce greenhouse gas emissions by 6,100 tons.

On April 18, 2019, JP Morgan Chase selected Syracuse as one of five winners of its inaugural Advancing Cities Challenge. The City of Syracuse was awarded $3 million for improving tech sector jobs and not-for-profit organizations in low- or middle-income neighborhoods with the overall goal of training young people, veterans, and people of color for future careers.

In April 2021, Amazon donated $1.75 million to the STEAM school at Central Tech in order to further increase access to tech education in the city.

=== Syracuse's Columbus Monument ===
Walsh worked with InterFaith Works, a local charity, to lead community discussions on Syracuse's Christopher Columbus monument in 2018 and 2019. In 2020, he established a formal advisory council, the Columbus Circle Action Group, to consider ways to modify Columbus Circle. That group put forth a number of ideas, but in its report stopped short of suggesting that the statue should be removed. Nonetheless, on October 9, 2020, Walsh announced he had decided to remove the statue and other parts of the statuary from the monument and send the statue of Columbus to an unidentified "private location".

In response, the Columbus Monument Corporation and 27 Syracuse taxpayers sued the City and Mayor on May 16, 2021 to stop the plan. The petitioners argued that the monument was privately funded and that private funds were integral to the monument's renovation by the City in 1992, and that Walsh lacked the legal authority under city law and a 1990s contract with the state to remove the monument or any part of it. On March 11, 2022, Supreme Court Justice Gerard Neri granted the petition in part, finding that the City had a legal duty to maintain the monument in its place.

== Electoral history ==
2017 Syracuse mayoral general election
Party	Candidate	Votes	%
Independence	Ben Walsh	12,351	48.38%
Reform/Upstate Jobs	Ben Walsh	1,233	4.83%
Total	Ben Walsh	13,584	53.21%
Democratic	Juanita Perez Williams	9,701	38.00%
Green	Howie Hawkins	1,017	4.02%
Republican	Laura B. Lavine	673	2.64%
Working Families	Joe Nicoletti	305	1.19%
Write-in		25	0.10%
Total votes		25,555	100%
Independence gain from Democratic			

2021 Syracuse mayoral general election
Party	Candidate	Votes	%
Independence	Ben Walsh (incumbent)	12,013	59.6%
Democratic	Khalid Bey	5,520	27.4%
Republican	Janet Burman	1,786	8.9%
Conservative	Janet Burman	567	2.8%
Total	Janet Burman	2,353	11.7%
Write-in		57	0.3%
Total votes		20,163	100%

Political offices
Preceded by Stephanie Miner	Mayor of Syracuse; 2018–present	Incumbent
