= List of mayors of Syracuse, New York =

Mayor of Syracuse
- Flag of the City of Syracuse
- Incumbent; Sharon Owens since December 31, 2025
- Style: The Honorable
- Term length: Four years; limited to two terms
- Inaugural holder: Harvey Baldwin
- Formation: 1848
- Salary: $115,000 (2019)

This is a complete list of mayors of Syracuse, New York.

== List of mayors ==
Mayors of Syracuse
#	Name	Image	Term	Notes
1.	Harvey Baldwin (D)		1848	
2.	Elias W. Leavenworth (W)		1849	
3.	Alfred H. Hovey (D)		1850	
4.	Horace Wheaton (D)		1851	
5.	Jason Cooper Woodruff (D)		1852	
6.	Dennis McCarthy (D)		1853	
7.	Allen Munroe (W)		1854	
8.	Lyman Stevens (D)		1855	
9.	Charles Ferre Williston (D)		1856–1857	
10.	William Winton (D)		1858	
11.	Elias W. Leavenworth (R)		1859	
12.	Amos Westcott (R)		1860	
13.	Charles Andrews (R)		1861–1862	
14.	Daniel Bookstaver (D)		1863	
15.	Archibald Campbell Powell (R)		1864	
16.	William Davenport Stewart (D)		1865–1867	
17.	Charles Andrews (R)		1868	
18.	Charles Parsons Clark (R)		1869–1870	
19.	Francis Edward Carroll (D)		1871–1872	
20.	William James Wallace (R)		1873	
21.	Nathan Fitch Graves (D)		1874	
22.	George Philip Hier (R)		1875	
23.	John Jacob Crouse (R)		1876	
24.	James Jerome Belden (R)		1877–1878	
25.	Irving Goodwin Vann (R)		1879	
26.	Francis Hendricks (R)		1880–1881	
27.	John Demong (D)		1882	
28.	Thomas Ryan (D)		1883–1885	
29.	Willis B. Burns (R)		1886–1887	First to serve two-year term
30.	William Burns Kirk III (D)		1888–1889	
31.	William Cowie (R)		1890–1891	
32.	Jacob Amos (R)		1892–1895	
33.	James Kennedy McGuire (D)		1896–1901	
34.	Jay Butler Kline (R)		1902–1903	
35.	Alan Cutler Fobes (R)		1904–1909	
36.	Edward Schoeneck (R)		1910–1913	
37.	Louis Will (Progressive)		1914–1916	
38.	Walter Robinson Stone (R)		1916–1919	
39.	Harry Haile Farmer (R)		1920–1921	
40.	John Henry Walrath (D)		1922–1925	
41.	Charles George Hanna (R)		1926–1929	
42.	Rolland Bristol Marvin (R)		1930–1941	
43.	Thomas Edward Kennedy (R)		1942–1945	
44.	Frank James Costello (R)		1946–1949	
45.	Thomas Joseph Corcoran (D)		1950–1953	
46.	Donald Howe Mead (R)		1954–1957	
47.	Anthony Aloysius Henninger (R)		1958–1961	
48.	William Francis Walsh (R)		1962–1969	
49.	Lee Alexander (D)		1970–1985	
50.	Thomas Ganley Young (D)		1986–1993	Two-term limits for office of mayor were put into place
51.	Roy Albert Bernardi (R)		1994–2001	Left office a few months early for a federal job at Department of Housing and Urban Development
52.	Matthew John Driscoll (D)		2001–2009	
53.	Stephanie A. Miner (D)		2010–2018	First female mayor of Syracuse
54.	Ben Walsh (I)		2018–2025	First independent mayor of Syracuse
55.	Sharon Owens (D)		2026-Present	First black mayor of Syracuse
