= List of Willamette University alumni =

This is a list of the notable alumni of Willamette University, a post-secondary school in Salem, Oregon in the United States. Founded in 1842 as the Oregon Institute, alumni have included those in Congress, the state government, and in the federal and state courts.

Note that the people listed may have only attended the university and may not have graduated.

== University ==
This includes alumni of the main school. Those who also attended one of the university's graduate schools are listed in those sections as well.

| Name | Attended | Notability | Reference |
|---|---|---|---|
| James Albaugh (b. 1950) | | Boeing executive | |
| Bruce Anderson (b. 1944) | 1962–66 | Linebacker in the National Football League | |
| Vic Backlund (b. 1936) | 1954–61 | Oregon state representative and professional baseball player | |
| Thomas A. Bartlett (b. 1930) | 1947–49 | Educator, chancellor of the State University of New York and the Oregon University System | |
| Charles B. Bellinger (1839–1905) | | Judge for the United States District Court for the District of Oregon | |
| Douglas H. Bosco (b. 1946) | 1963–1968 | U.S. representative from California; also attended the law school | |
| Bruce Botelho (b. 1948) | B.A. 1971 | Alaska attorney general and mayor of Juneau, Alaska; also attended the law school | |
| George M. Brown (1864–1934) | Class of 1885 | Oregon attorney general and justice on the Oregon Supreme Court | |
| James M. Brown (b. 1941) | Class of 1964 | Oregon attorney general and county district attorney | |
| Winifred Byrd (1884–1970) | | Concert pianist and educator | |
| J. R. Campbell (b. 1918) | B.A. 1940 | Justice on the Oregon Supreme Court and judge of the Oregon Court of Appeals; also attended the law school | |
| Emma Plummer Chadwick (1863–1962) | | Head of the Order of the Eastern Star and co-designer of the Flag of Washington | |
| Daryl Chapin (1906–1995) | | Physicist best known for co-inventing solar cells | |
| Terry Cooney (b. 1933) | | Former Major League Baseball umpire | |
| James Cuno (b. 1951) | Class of 1973 | Art historian and museum director | |
| Robert Eakin (1848–1917) | Class of 1873 | Justice on the Oregon Supreme Court | |
| Sam Farr (b. 1941) | B.S. 1963 | U.S. representative from California | |
| James Martin Fitzgerald (b. 1920) | B.A. 1950 | Judge for the United States District Court for the District of Alaska and the Alaska Supreme Court; also attended the law school | |
| Theodore Thurston Geer (1851–1924) | | Governor of Oregon | |
| Melvin Clark George (1849–1933) | | U.S. representative from Oregon | |
| Alonzo Gesner (1842–1912) | | Oregon state senator | |
| Joseph K. Gill (1841–1931) | 1864–1865 | Founder of J. K. Gill Company | |
| Edith Green (1910–1987) | 1927–1929 | U.S. representative from Oregon | |
| Andrew Halcro (b. 1964) | | Member of the Alaska House of Representatives | |
| Bert E. Haney (1879–1943) | | Judge for the United States Court of Appeals for the Ninth Circuit | |
| Mark Hatfield (1922–2011) | 1940–1943 | Governor of Oregon, United States senator, and state legislator | |
| Willis C. Hawley (1864–1941) | Class of 1888 | Congressman, president of Willamette; also attended the law school | |
| Liz Heaston (b. 1977) | Class of 1999 | First woman to score in a college football game | |
| Thomas Hemingway | Class of 1962 | Brigadier general in the U.S. Air Force; also attended the law school | |
| Chauncey Hosford (1820–1911) | | Minister and educator, attended the Oregon Institute | |
| Charles A. Johns (1857–1932) | B.A. 1878 | Justice of the Oregon Supreme Court and Supreme Court of the Philippines | |
| Daniel Jones (1830–1891) | | Leader in the Methodist Episcopal church, first African American student at Willamette | |
| Randall B. Kester (b. 1916) | Class of 1937 | Justice of the Oregon Supreme Court | |
| Jeff Kruse (b. 1951) | B.S. | Oregon state senator | |
| Harry Lane (1855–1917) | Class of 1876 | Mayor of Portland, U.S. senator; also attended the medical school | |
| Richard Laymon (1947–2001) | B.A. | Horror writer | |
| Cal Lee (b. 1946) | | Football coach | |
| Susan M. Leeson (b. 1946) | B.A. 1968 | Justice on the Oregon Supreme Court; also attended the law school | |
| Alex J. Mandl (b. 1943) | | Businessman, former president of AT&T | |
| Peter K. Manning (b. 1940) | B.A. 1961 | Academic, professor at Michigan State University | |
| Lesil McGuire (b. 1971) | B.A. 1993 | Member of the Alaska House of Representatives and the Alaska State Senate; also attended the law school | |
| Charles L. McNary (1874–1944) | | United States senator from Oregon and 1940 Republican vice-presidential nominee | |
| John Hugh McNary (1867–1937) | | Judge for the United States District Court for the District of Oregon | |
| Robert A. Miller (1854–1941) | | Politician, member of the Oregon House of Representatives | |
| Laurie Monnes Anderson (b. 1945) | B.A. 1968 | Member of the Oregon House of Representatives | |
| Charles S. Moore (1857–1915) | 1872–1874 | Oregon state treasurer and county judge | |
| Charles B. Moores (1849–1930) | B.A. 1870 | Speaker of the Oregon House of Representatives | |
| Merrill Moores (1856–1929) | | U.S. representative from Indiana | |
| Dale T. Mortensen (b. 1939) | B.A. 1961 | Professor at Northwestern University; 2010 winner of the Nobel Prize in Economics | |
| Bob Packwood (b. 1932) | Class of 1954 | United States senator from Oregon | |
| Patricia Price | B.A., B. Mus. 2004 | Music producer | |
| Skip Priest | B.A. | Member of the Washington House of Representatives | |
| Tobias Read (b. 1975) | B.A. (1997) | Oregon state treasurer, member of the Oregon House of Representatives | |
| John W. Reynolds (b. 1875) | A.B (1895); A.M. (1897) | Dean of the law school | |
| Samuel T. Richardson (1857–1921) | B.A. 1892 | Educator and dean of the law school; also attended the law school | |
| Nancy Ryles (1937–1990) | | Member of the Oregon House of Representatives, Senate, and Public Utility Commission | |
| Ron Saxton (b. 1954) | Class of 1976 | Attorney, two-time candidate for Oregon governor | |
| Herb Schmalenberger (1925–2006) | | College football coach | |
| Frederick Schwatka (1849–1892) | | Explorer of the Arctic | |
| Otto Richard Skopil, Jr. (b. 1919) | B.A. 1941 | Judge for the United States Court of Appeals for the Ninth Circuit; also attended the law school | |
| Robert Freeman Smith (b. 1931) | B.A. 1953 | Member of the U.S. House of Representatives from Oregon's 2nd district; speaker of the Oregon House of Representatives | |
| Vic Snyder (b. 1947) | B.A. 1975 | Member of the U.S. House of Representatives from Arkansas's 2nd district | |
| Winlock W. Steiwer (1852–1920) | Class of 1971 | Oregon state senator and county judge | |
| Nick Symmonds (b. 1983) | Class of 2006 | Distance runner, 2008 Olympian, seven NCAA Div. III titles | |
| Andy Tillman (b. 1952) | c. 1970 | A founder of the US llama industry | |
| Isaac Homer Van Winkle (1870–1943) | Class of 1898 | Oregon attorney general and dean of the College of Law; also attended the law school | |
| John B. Waldo (1844–1907) | Class of 1866 | Justice on the Oregon Supreme Court | |
| William Waldo (1832–1911) | | President of the Oregon State Senate | |
| Kim Wallan | B.S. | Member of the Oregon House of Representatives; also attended the law school | |
| Marie Watt (b. 1967) | Class of 1990 | Artist | |
| Dick Weisgerber | | Football player | |
| Edward Curtis Wells (1910–1986) | | Businessman, vice president at Boeing Company | |
| Frank K. Wheaton (b. 1951) | | Agent and actor | |
| Richard Williams (1836–1914) | | Member of the U.S. House of Representatives from Oregon's at-large district | |
| John N. Williamson (1855–1943) | | Member of the U.S. House of Representatives from Oregon's 2nd district | |
| Parish L. Willis (1838–1917) | B.A. 1865 | Oregon state senator | |
| Greg Zerzan | | Federal government administrator; also attended the law school | |

== College of Law ==
This includes alumni of the College of Law. Those who also attended one of the university's other schools are listed in those sections as well.

| Name | Attended | Notability | Reference |
|---|---|---|---|
| Douglas H. Bosco (b. 1946) | J.D. 1971 | U.S. representative from California; also attended Willamette as an undergraduate | |
| Bruce Botelho (b. 1948) | J.D. 1976 | Alaska attorney general and mayor of Juneau, Alaska; also attended Willamette as an undergraduate | |
| Jay Bowerman (1876–1957) | 1893–1896 | Former governor of Oregon | |
| J. R. Campbell (b. 1918) | J.D. 1942 | Justice on the Oregon Supreme Court and judge of the Oregon Court of Appeals; also attended Willamette as an undergraduate | |
| Wallace P. Carson, Jr. (b. 1934) | J.D. 1962 | Former chief justice of the Oregon Supreme Court | |
| Paul De Muniz | J.D. 1975 | Current chief justice of the Oregon Supreme Court | |
| James Martin Fitzgerald (1920–2011) | LL.B. 1951 | Judge on the United States District Court for the District of Alaska and the Alaska Supreme Court; also attended Willamette as an undergraduate | |
| Jeffrey Grayson (1942–2009) | | Co-founder of Capitol Consultants and convicted white collar criminal | |
| Mark Hatfield (1922–2011) | | Former Oregon secretary of state, governor, and longtime U.S. senator; also attended Willamette as an undergraduate | |
| Willis C. Hawley (1864–1941) | LL.B. 1888 | Congressman from Oregon and president of Willamette University; also attended Willamette as an undergraduate | |
| Thomas Hemingway | J.D. 1965 | Brigadier general in the United States Air Force; also attended Willamette as an undergraduate | |
| Fern Hobbs (1883–1964) | LL.B. 1913 | Implemented martial law in Copperfield, Oregon, while serving as private secretary to the governor of Oregon | |
| Edward H. Howell (1915–1994) | LL.B. 1940 | Oregon Supreme Court justice | |
| Jay Inslee (b. 1951) | J.D. 1976 | Former governor of Washington State, former member of the U.S. House of Representatives from Washington state | |
| Faith Ireland | J.D. 1969 | Justice on the Washington Supreme Court | |
| Joshua M. Kindred (b. 1977) | J.D. 2005 | Judge on the United States District Court for the District of Alaska | |
| Susan M. Leeson (b. 1946) | J.D. 1981 | Justice on the Oregon Supreme Court; also attended Willamette as an undergraduate | |
| Berkeley Lent (1921–2007) | J.D. 1950 | Chief justice of the Oregon Supreme Court and member of both chambers of the Oregon Legislative Assembly | |
| Virginia Linder | J.D. 1980 | Oregon Supreme Court justice | |
| Amanda Marshall | J.D. 1995 | United States attorney | |
| William M. McAllister (1896–1986) | LL.B. 1928 | Chief justice of the Oregon Supreme Court and speaker of the Oregon House of Representatives | |
| John McCourt (1874–1924) | Class of 1896 | Justice on the Oregon Supreme Court | |
| Conde McCullough (1887–1946) | LL.B. 1928 | Bridge designer and civil engineer | |
| Lesil McGuire (b. 1971) | J.D. 1998 | Member of the Alaska Senate and House; also attended Willamette as an undergraduate | |
| Bob Mionske (b. 1962) | | U.S. Olympic racing cyclist | |
| James W. Mott (1883–1945) | LL.B. 1917 | Member of the U.S. House of Representatives from Oregon | |
| Lisa Murkowski (b. 1957) | J.D. 1985 | United States senator from Alaska | |
| Albin W. Norblad (1939–2014) | | Oregon state circuit court judge | |
| E. M. Page (1893–1959) | Class of 1913 | Oregon Supreme Court justice | |
| Steven Powers | J.D. 2001 | Oregon Court of Appeals; first Filipino American man | |
| Norma Paulus (b. 1933) | LL.B. 1962 | Oregon secretary of state and Oregon superintendent of Public Instruction | |
| Benjamin Hale Settle (b. 1947) | J.D. 1972 | Federal judge in Washington state | |
| Otto Richard Skopil, Jr. (b. 1919) | LL.B. 1946 | Federal judge in Oregon and for the Ninth Circuit | |
| John F. Steelhammer | | Oregon speaker of the House | |
| Kenneth S. Stern | J.D. | Defense lawyer | |
| Charles Swindells | | Former ambassador and businessman | |
| Isaac Homer Van Winkle (1870–1943) | Class of 1901 | Oregon attorney general and dean of the College of Law; also attended Willamette as an undergraduate | |
| Kim Wallan | J.D. | Member of the Oregon House of Representatives; also attended Willamette as an undergraduate | |
| Jennifer Williamson | J.D. 2001 | Democratic politician who represented Oregon's 36th District in the Oregon House of Representatives; majority leader 2015–2019 | |
| Walter C. Winslow (1882–1962) | LL.B. 1908 | Justice pro tempore of the Oregon Supreme Court | |
| Stephen K. Yamashiro (1941–2011) | JD 1969 | Mayor of Hawaii County | |
| Leon Rene Yankwich (1888–1975) | LL.B. 1909 | Federal district court judge in California | |
| Greg Zerzan | | Federal government administrator; also attended Willamette as an undergraduate | |

== Others ==
This includes alumni of the Atkinson Graduate School of Management and the defunct College of Medicine. Those who also attended one of the university's other schools are listed in those sections as well.

| Name | Attended | Notability | Reference |
|---|---|---|---|
| Jason Atkinson (b. 1970) | Atkinson (1997) | Member of the Oregon Senate and House of Representatives | |
| Sandy Baruah | Atkinson | Assistant secretary of Commerce for Economic Development in the United States Commerce Department | |
| David Gomberg | Atkinson (1981) | Member of the Oregon House of Representatives | |
| Augustus C. Kinney (1845–1908) | Medicine (1869) | Research on tuberculosis | |
| Harry Lane (1855–1917) | Medicine (1878) | Mayor of Portland and U.S. senator | |
| Patricia Price | Atkinson (2009) | Music producer | |
| Punit Renjen (b. 1961) | Atkinson (1986) | Businessperson | |
| Levi L. Rowland (1831–1908) | Medicine (1872) | Oregon superintendent of Public Instruction and Superintendent of Oregon State Insane Asylum | |
| Loyal B. Stearns (1853–1936) | Medicine | Member of the Oregon House of Representatives and judge | |

== See also ==
- List of people from Oregon
