= List of people from Bend, Oregon =

The following is a partial list of notable residents, past and present, from Bend, Oregon, a city in Central Oregon in the western part of the United States of America. A separate list of people from Oregon is available.

- Broda Otto Barnes, physician, hypothyroidism researcher
- Shannon Bex, member of the musical group Danity Kane
- Mohini Bhardwaj, Olympic gymnast
- Drew Bledsoe, former NFL quarterback
- Luke Musgrave, tight end for the Green Bay Packers
- Ian Boswell, racing cyclist for Team Katusha–Alpecin
- Allie Brosh, author, Hyperbole and a Half
- Pat Cashman, comedian, television and radio personality
- John Chambers, CEO of Cisco Corporation; part-time resident
- John Clem Clarke, painter and college football player for the Oregon State Beavers football team
- Ray W. Clough, professor emeritus at UC-Berkeley, founder of the finite element method
- Kent Couch, lawn-chair balloonist
- Adam Craig, professional mountain bike racer and Olympian
- Kiki Cutter, Olympic and World Cup ski champion
- Thomas Del Ruth, cinematographer
- Nate Doss, professional disc golfer and brewer; three-time PDGA World Champion
- Brian Dunning, science author and film producer; runs Skeptoid Inc
- Ashton Eaton, 2012 and 2016 Olympic gold medalist, world record holder in both the decathlon and heptathlon
- Alan Embree, former Major League Baseball player
- Myrlie Evers-Williams, civil rights activist
- Ben Ferguson, professional snowboarder
- Jon Fogarty, professional race car driver currently with GAINSCO/Bob Stallings Racing
- Tommy Ford, professional ski racer and Olympian
- Matthew Fox, television actor on the series Lost
- Michael Garrison, electronic musician
- Jere Gillis, former NHL player
- Scott Goldblatt, 2000 Olympic silver medalist, 2004 Olympic gold medalist in swimming
- Paul Hait, Olympic gold medalist
- Ray Hatton, college professor, author, and long-distance runner
- Chris Horner, pro road racing cyclist, winner of the 2013 Vuelta a España
- Steve House, mountain climber, first non-European winner of Piolet d'Or Award
- Stan Humphries, former NFL quarterback
- Dave Hunt, founder of the Berean Call ministry
- Sara Jackson-Holman, singer-songwriter
- Valarie Jenkins, professional disc golfer and brewer; four-time PDGA World Champion
- Jason Keep, basketball player
- Donald M. Kerr, conservationist and founder of the High Desert Museum
- Rustin R. Kimsey, Episcopalian bishop
- Gary Lewis, outdoor writer for ESPN, author and TV host
- Ryan Longwell, NFL place kicker
- Gerry Lopez, Hawaiian surfing legend and film actor ("Conan the Barbarian")
- Robert D. Maxwell, Medal of Honor recipient
- Donald L. McFaul, U.S. Navy SEAL killed in Panama in 1989
- Max McNown, singer, songwriter
- J. Patrick Metke, politician and businessman
- Jourdan Miller, fashion model and winner of America's Next Top Model, cycle 20
- Chino Moreno, musician and lead singer of Deftones
- William A. Niskanen, former chairman of the Council of Economic Advisers in the Reagan administration; former chairman of the Cato Institute
- Paul Phillips, professional poker player
- George P. Putnam, publisher; husband of Amelia Earhart
- Jeremy Roloff, TV personality, Little People Big World
- Grant Rosenberg, TV writer-producer and author
- Laurenne Ross, Olympic alpine ski racer
- Beckie Scott, 2002 Olympic gold medalist in cross country skiing
- Derek Sitter, founder/former owner of Volcanic Theatre Pub and actor/filmmaker
- John Spence, first American combat frogman
- David Stoliar, sole survivor of the Struma disaster
- Conrad Stoltz, three-time XTERRA off-road triathlon champion
- Byron A. Stover, businessman and state legislator
- Mickey Tettleton, former Major League Baseball player
- Andy Tillman, llama rancher, businessman, and author
- Ryan Trebon, professional mountain bike and cyclocross racer
- April Genevieve Tucholke, novelist
- Andreas Wecker, Olympic horizontal bar gold medalist in 1996
- Gary Zimmerman, NFL player, inducted into the Pro Football Hall of Fame in 2008
