= List of people from Oregon =

State flag of Oregon

Location of Oregon in the United States

This is a list of notable people associated with the U.S. state of Oregon through birth or residence.

== A ==
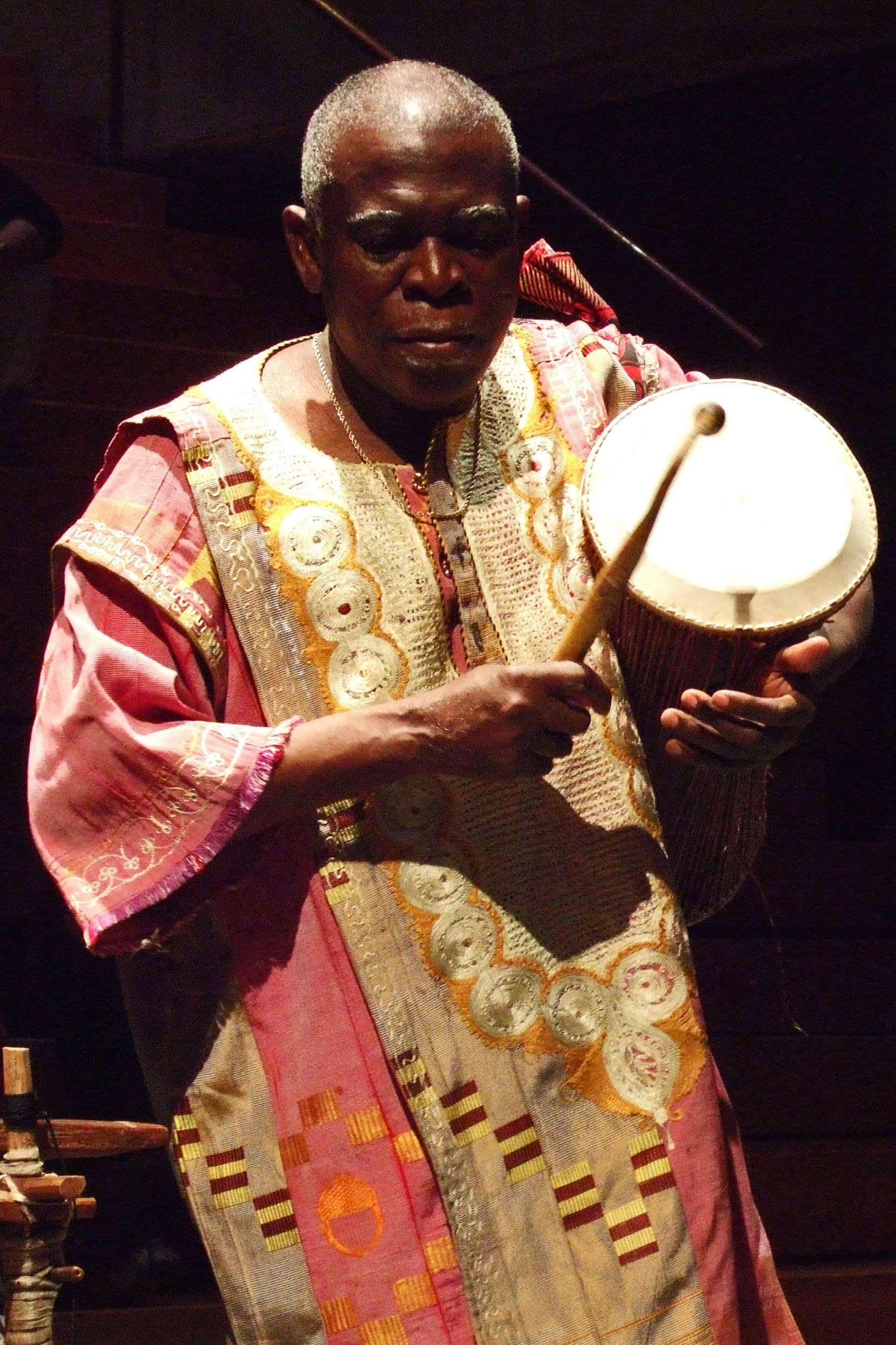
Obo Addy, musician

- Bruce Abbott (born 1954) – actor
- Kenneth Acker (born 1992) – cornerback for the San Francisco 49ers
- Duane Ackerson (1942–2020) – poet
- Brock Adams (1927–2004) – U.S. representative and senator from Washington
- Alvin P. Adams Jr. (1942–2015) – diplomat
- Lucia H. Faxon Additon (1847–1919) – writer, teacher, social reformer
- Obo Addy (1936–2012) – worldbeat musician
- Brad Adkins (born 1973) – artist
- Robert H. Adleman (1919–1995) – novelist, historian and restaurateur
- Danny Ainge (born 1959) – former National Basketball Association and Major League Baseball player, NBA executive
- Erik Ainge (born 1986) – New York Jets quarterback, and nephew of Danny Ainge
- Jerome Alden (1921–1997) – playwright and screenwriter
- Art Alexakis (born 1962) – member of Everclear
- James H. Allen (1928–2015) – clown, author
- Laura Allen (born 1974) – actress
- Ryan Allen (born 1990) – punter for the New England Patriots
- Goli Ameri (born 1956) – U.S. Assistant Secretary of State for Educational and Cultural Affairs
- Rachel Ames (born 1929) – actress
- Aminé (born 1994) – hip hop musician and rapper
- Bob Amsberry (1928–1957) – actor
- David Anders (born 1981) – actor
- Larry Andersen (born 1962) – former Major League Baseball pitcher
- Bruce Anderson (born 1944) – former National Football League linebacker
- Derek Anderson (born 1983) – quarterback for the Carolina Panthers
- Scott Anderson (born 1962) – former Major League Baseball pitcher
- Andy Andrist (born 1965) – stand-up comedian
- Oliver Cromwell Applegate (1845–1938) – politician
- James E. Atwater (born 1946) – scientist; 2006 Wright Brothers medalist
- Montgomery Atwater (1904–1976) – author, skier, avalanche control expert
- Les AuCoin (born 1942) – retired US congressman, 1st Dist., 1974–1992, Oregon State House Majority Leader, 1973–74
- Jean M. Auel (born 1936) – author
- Thomas J. Autzen (1888–1958) – namesake of University of Oregon's stadium, contributing engineer to plywood manufacturing technologies

== B ==
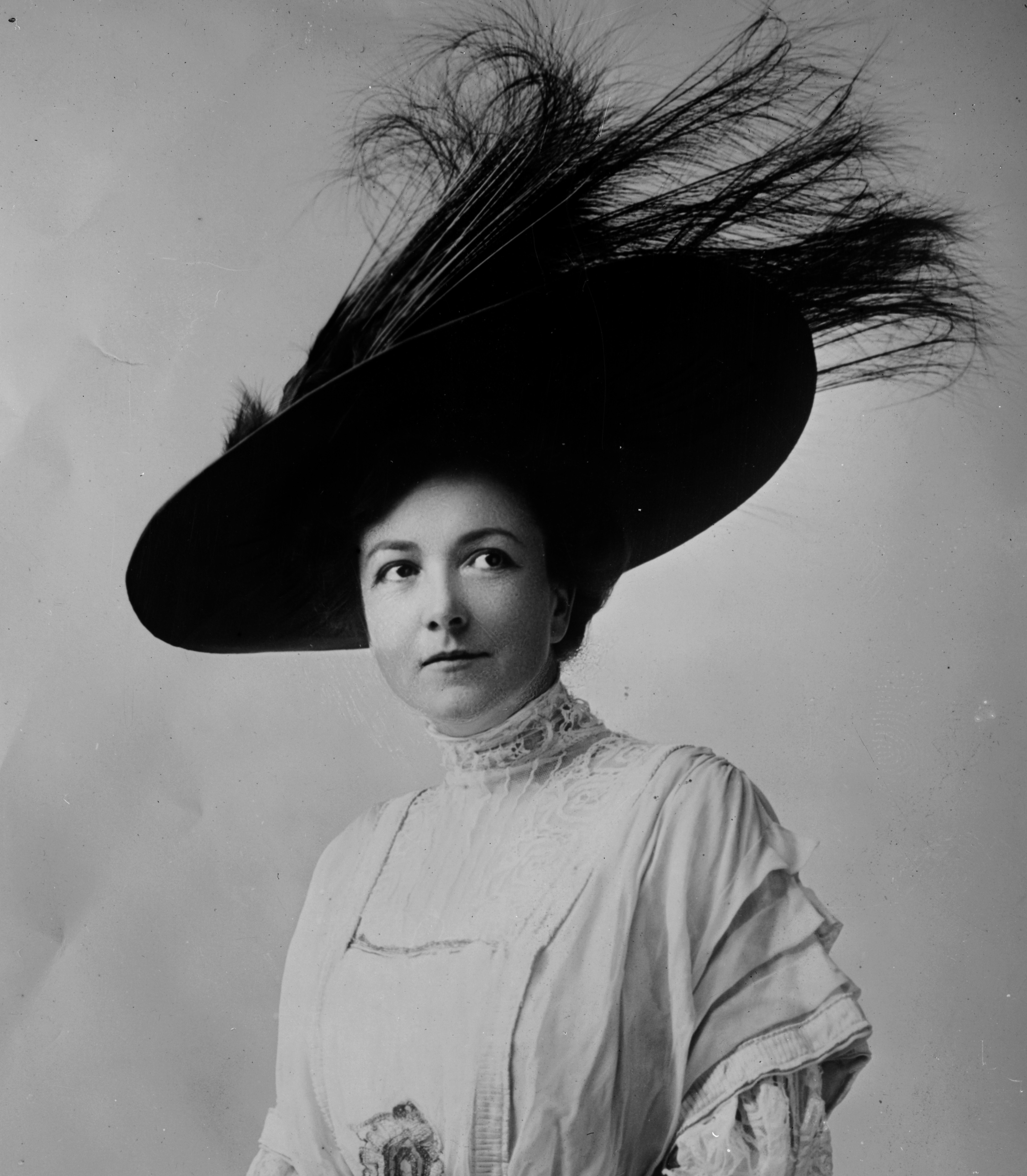
Blanche Bates, actress

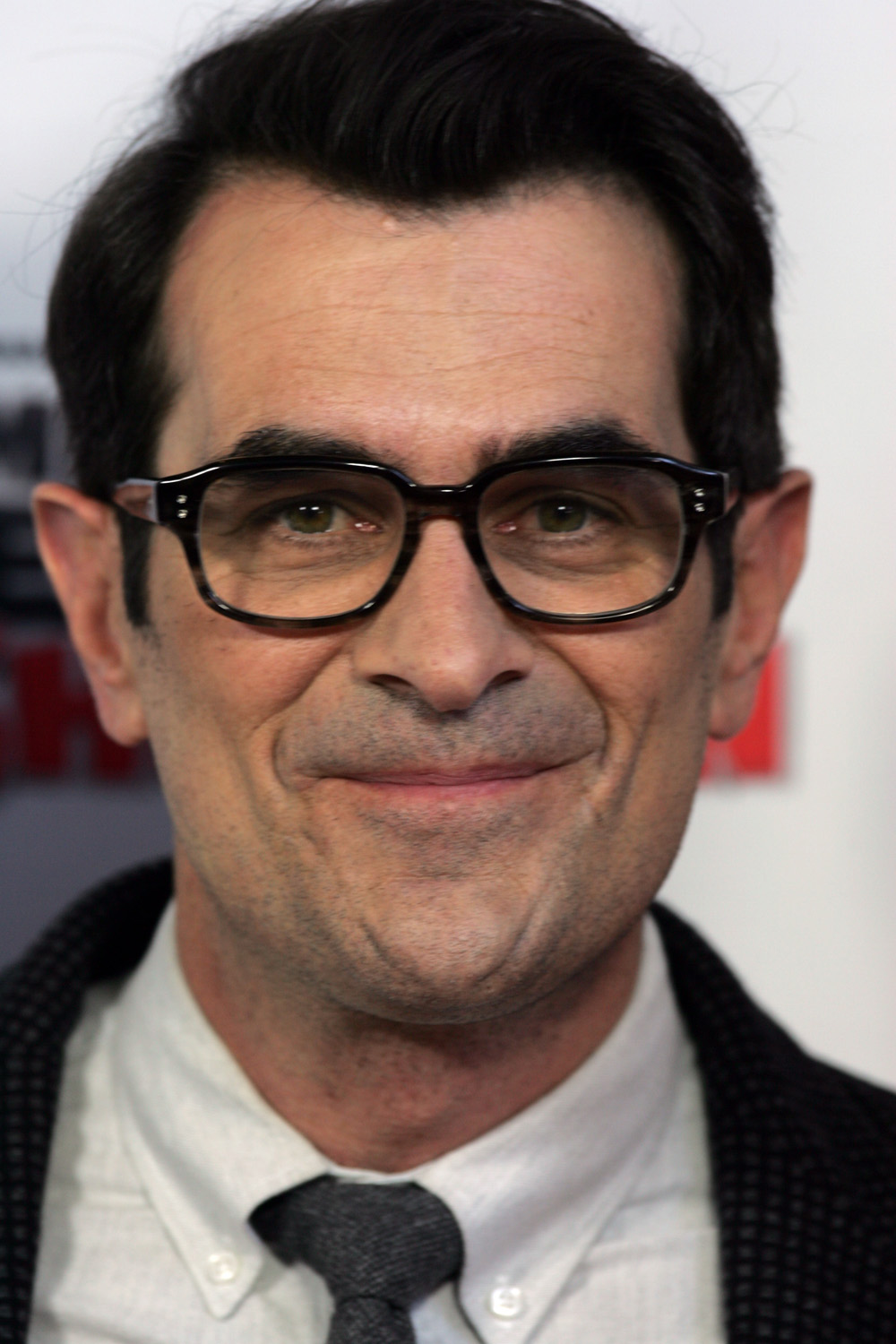
Ty Burrell, actor

- Charlie Babb (1873–1954) – Major League Baseball shortstop
- Wally Backman (born 1959) – Major League Baseball second baseman, Oregon Sports Hall of Fame inductee
- Preston Bailey (born 2000) – actor
- Rex T. Barber (1917–2001) – World War II fighter pilot; known for shooting down Isoroku Yamamoto
- Carl Barks (1901–2001) – comic book writer and artist
- Sandy Barr (1938–2007) – professional wrestler, referee, promoter
- Jeffrey Barry (born 1969) – former Major League Baseball outfielder
- Blanche Bates (1873–1941) – stage and film actress
- Scott Beach (1931–1996) – actor
- Terry Bean – co-founder of the Human Rights Campaign and Democratic National Committee member
- James Beard (1903–1985) – chef and food journalist
- Howard W. Bergerson (1922-2011) – writer and palindromist
- Austin Bibens-Dirkx (born 1985) – relief pitcher for the Texas Rangers
- Josh Bidwell (born 1976) – former NFL punter
- Mel Blanc (1908–1989) – voice actor
- Sheila Bleck (born 1974) – IFBB professional bodybuilder
- Lynette Boggs (born 1963) – politician, attorney, author, Miss Oregon 1989
- Harry D. Boivin (1904–1999) – lawyer and legislative leader
- Tracy Bonham (born 1967) – alternative rock musician
- William H. Boring (1841–1932) – Civil War veteran, pioneer
- Kevin Boss (born 1984) – tight end for the Kansas City Chiefs
- Chris Botti (born 1962) – trumpeter, recording artist
- Grayson Boucher (born 1984) – basketball player in the Streetball Mix Tape Tour
- Bill Bowerman (1911–1999) – track coach at University of Oregon, Nike co-founder
- Matt Braunger (born 1974) – actor and stand-up comedian
- Ronnie Brewer (born 1985) – player for the Chicago Bulls
- Greg Brock (born 1957) – former Major League Baseball player for the Los Angeles Dodgers and Milwaukee Brewers
- Meredith Brooks (born 1958) – musician
- Scott Brosius (born 1966) – former Major League Baseball third baseman for the Oakland A's and New York Yankees
- Jasmin Savoy Brown (born 1994) – actress
- Bill Brown (1855–1941) – pioneer horse and sheep rancher
- Kate Brown (born 1960) – Spanish-born politician, 38th governor of Oregon
- Brian Bruney (born 1982) – former Major League Baseball relief pitcher
- Louise Bryant (1885–1936) – journalist and writer
- Edgar Buchanan (1903–1979) – actor
- Peter Buck (born 1956) – musician, lead guitarist of R.E.M.
- Jamie Burke (born 1971) – former Major League Baseball catcher
- Ty Burrell (born 1967) – actor
- Brian Burres (born 1981) – Major League Baseball pitcher for the Pittsburgh Pirates

== C ==
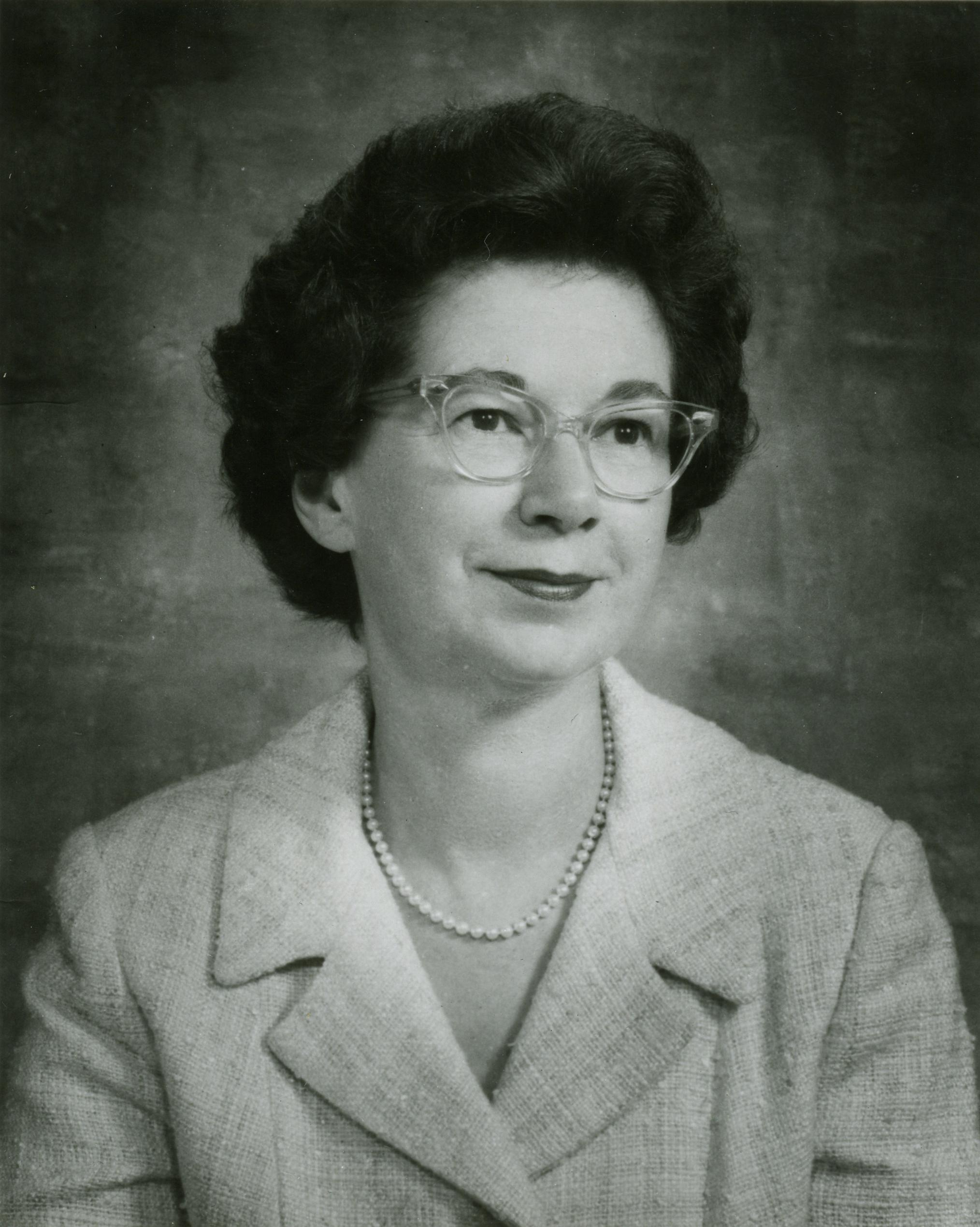
Beverly Cleary, author

- Bruce Campbell (born 1958) – actor
- Marion Eugene Carl (1915–1998) – United States Marine Corps fighter ace and record-setting test pilot
- Jean Carmen (1913–1993) – actress, pin-up model
- Margaret Carter (born 1935) – politician
- Raymond Carver (1938–1988) – author
- Anthony W. Case (born 1980) – astrophysicist
- Erin Chambers (born 1979) – actress
- Jeff Charleston (born 1983) – former National Football League defensive end
- Daveigh Chase (1990–2026) – actress
- Arthur Chin (1913–1997) – World War II flying ace
- Janet Chvatal (born 1964) – classical soprano, author and director of musicals
- Adam Cimber (born 1990) – Major League Baseball pitcher for the Cleveland Indians
- Beverly Cleary (1916–2021) – author
- Kellen Clemens (born 1983) – National Football League quarterback for the San Diego Chargers
- Michelle Clunie (born 1969) – actress
- Pinto Colvig (1892–1967) – actor, voice actor
- Thomas Condon (1822–1907) – minister, geologist, and paleontologist
- Donald Cook (1901–1961) – actor
- Gretchen Corbett (born 1947) – actress
- Henry L. Corbett (1881–1957) – businessman, civic leader, and politician
- Henry W. Corbett (1827–1903) – Oregon pioneer, businessman, politician, and philanthropist
- Robert O. Cornthwaite (1917–2006) – character actor, Picket Fences
- Chad Cota (born 1971) – former National Football League player and co-owner of InfoStructure
- Colby Covington (born 1988) – mixed martial artist
- Trevor Crowe (born 1983) – former Major League Baseball outfielder
- Ann Curry (born 1956) – television journalist

== D ==
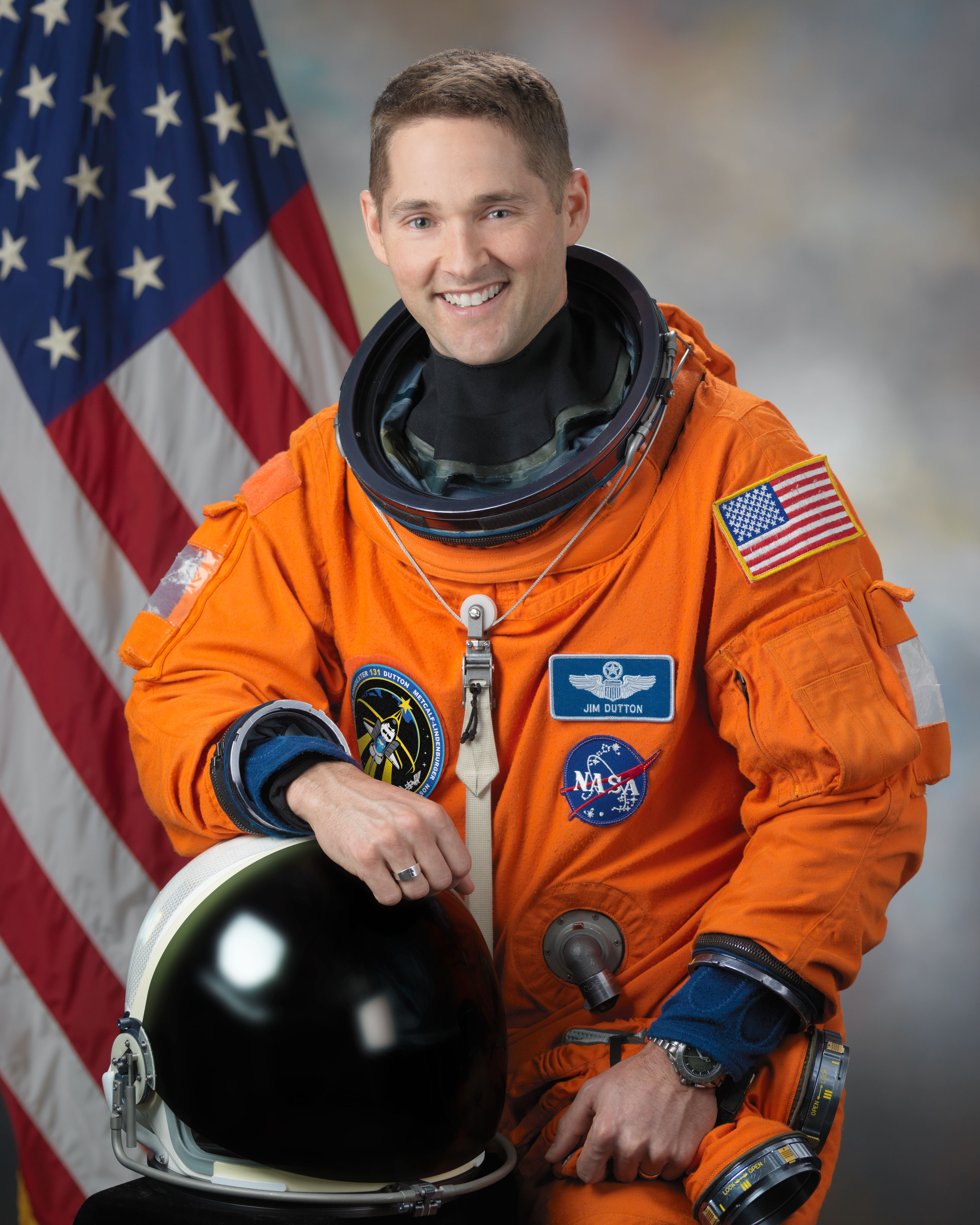
James Dutton, astronaut

- Bernard Daly (1858–1920) – pioneer doctor, businessman, rancher, and politician
- George Dantzig (1914–2005) – mathematical scientist
- Ray (1900–1983) and Hugh DeAutremont (1900–1984) – criminals
- David DeCoteau (born 1962) – film director and producer
- Madeline DeFrees (1919-2015) – poet, teacher, and nun
- Richard Diebenkorn (1922–1993) – artist
- Marie Aioe Dorion (ca. 1786–1850) – member of Pacific Fur Company expedition
- Sarah Dougher (born 1967) – musician
- Sho Dozono (born 1944) – businessman, candidate in 2008 Portland mayoral race
- Brandon Drury (born 1992) – second baseman for the Arizona Diamondbacks
- Patrick Duffy (born 1949) – actor
- Mindy Duncan – beauty queen
- Mike Dunleavy Jr. (born 1980) – basketball player for the Chicago Bulls
- Katherine Dunn (1945–2016) – writer
- James Dutton (born 1968) – astronaut

== E ==
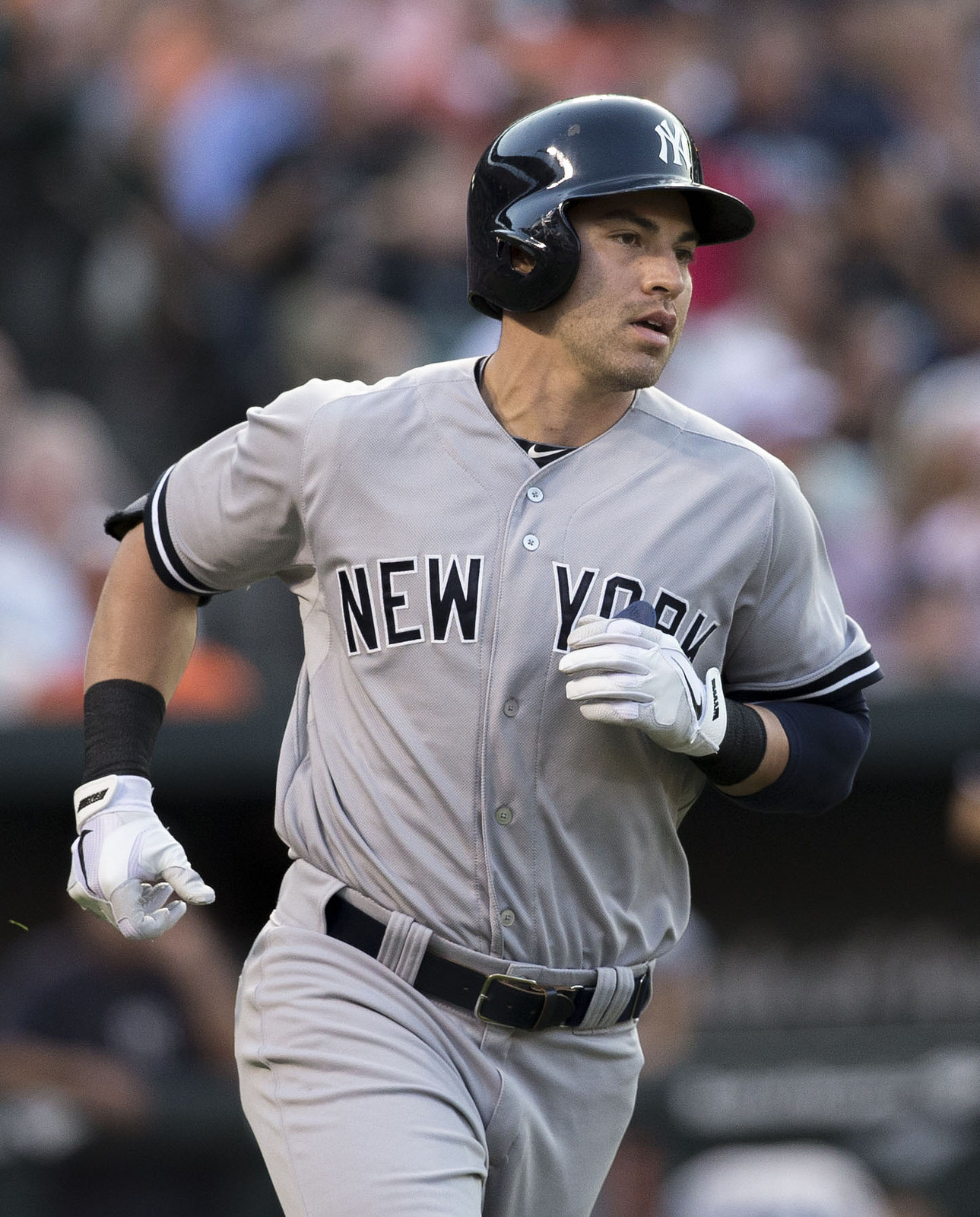
Jacoby Ellsbury, MLB center fielder

- Robert Eakin (1848–1917) – Oregon Supreme Court chief justice
- Randall Edwards (born 1961) – Oregon State Treasurer
- Chandler Egan (1884–1936) – golf course designer
- Mike Ekstrom (born 1983) – Major League Baseball pitcher for the Tampa Bay Rays
- Sam Elliott (born 1944) – actor
- LeRoy Ellis (1940–2012) – NBA basketball player
- Jacoby Ellsbury (born 1983) – Major League Baseball outfielder for the New York Yankees
- Harris Ellsworth (1899–1986) – member of U.S. Congress from Oregon
- Jeri Ellsworth (born 1974) – entrepreneur and autodidact computer chip designer
- Jack Ely (1943–2015) – musician of The Kingsmen
- Douglas Engelbart (1925–2013) – inventor and early computer pioneer
- Siegfried Engelmann (1931–2019) – educator
- Marie Equi (1872–1952) – physician and anarchist
- John R. Everett (1918–1992) – president of Hollins College, first chancellor of the Municipal College System of the City of New York, and president of the New School for Social Research
- Neil Everett (born 1962) – ESPN sportscaster
- Tom Everett (born 1948) – actor
- Chris Eyre (born 1968) – film director and producer

== F ==
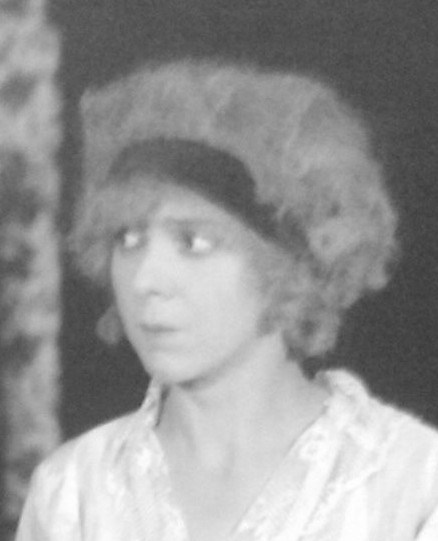
Nell Franzen, actress

- Tami Farrell (born 1984) – Miss Teen USA 2003
- Rich Fellers (born 1959) – Olympic equestrian
- Mark Few (born 1962) – head men's basketball coach at Gonzaga University
- Todd Field (born 1964) – screenwriter, film director, actor
- David Fincher (born 1962) – film director
- Francis Fletcher (1814–1871) – British Oregon pioneer
- George Buck Flower (1937–2004) – actor
- Sally Flynn (born 1946) – singer
- Peter Foley (born 1965 or 1966) – former snowboarding coach; suspended for 10 years for sexual misconduct
- Dick Fosbury (1947–2023) – track and field athlete; invented the "Fosbury Flop"
- Howie Fox (1921–1955) – Major League Baseball pitcher
- Harriet Frank Jr. (1923–2020) – screenwriter
- Nell Franzen (1889–1973) – actress
- Andrew C.K Forcier(born 7-11-1995) – athlete wrestler. Received 2 national titles (2012-2013) osaa first national championship

== G ==
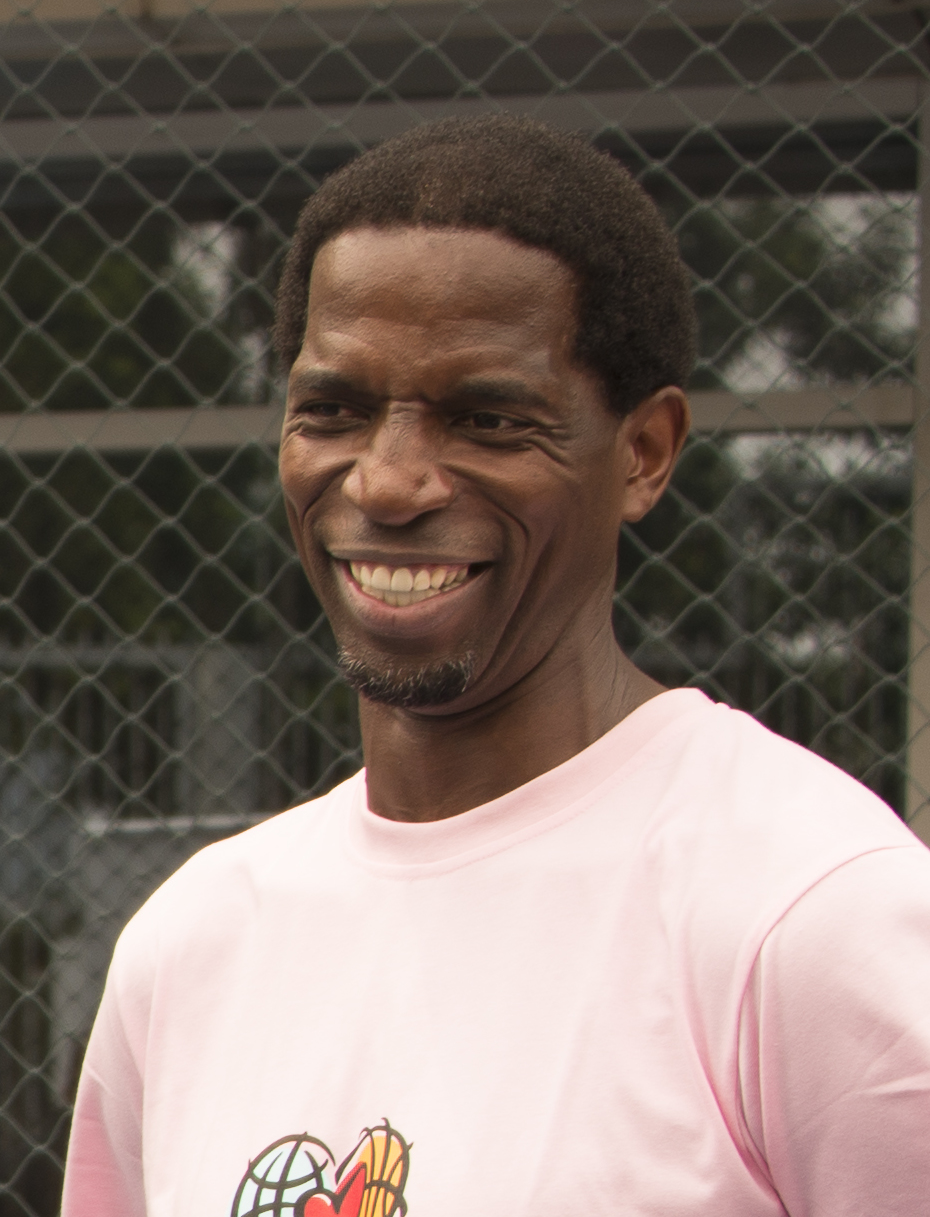
A.C. Green, NBA player

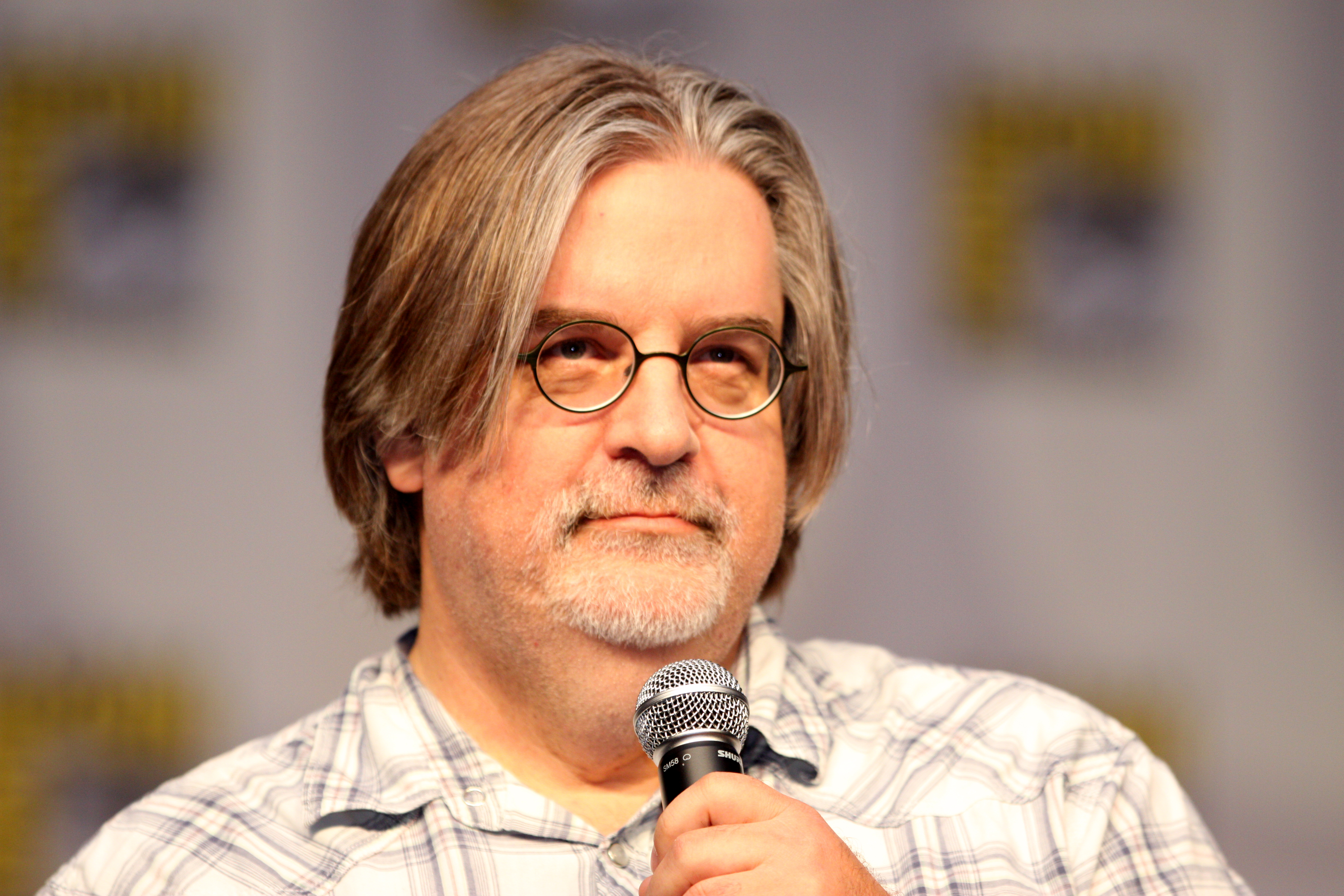
Matt Groening, cartoonist

- Clark Gable (1901–1960) – actor
- Maggie Gallagher (born 1960) – social conservative writer and commentator
- Richard Garfield (born 1963) – mathematician, inventor, and game designer
- Dan Gauthier (born 1963) – actor
- Laura Gibson (born 1979) – singer-songwriter, musician
- Alfred Carlton Gilbert (1884–1961) – athlete, toy-maker and businessman; inventor of the Erector Set
- Karl Glusman (born 1988) – actor
- Neil Goldschmidt (born 1940) – influential and controversial governor, mayor of Portland, lobbyist
- Brandon Gonzáles (born 1984) – professional boxer
- Avel Gordly (1947–2026) – first African American woman elected to the Oregon State Senate
- A.C. Green (born 1963) – NBA player
- Alex Green (born 1988) – National Football League running back for the Green Bay Packers
- Edith Green (1910–1987) – Oregon congresswoman and educator
- Scott Gragg (born 1972) – National Football League offensive tackle for the San Francisco 49ers and New York Jets
- Kevin Gregg (born 1978) – relief pitcher for the Baltimore Orioles
- Matt Groening (born 1954) – creator of The Simpsons and Futurama
- Les Gutches (born 1973) – two-time world medalist and world champion in freestyle wrestling
- Jeremy Guthrie (born 1979) – Major League Baseball pitcher for the Kansas City Royals

== H ==
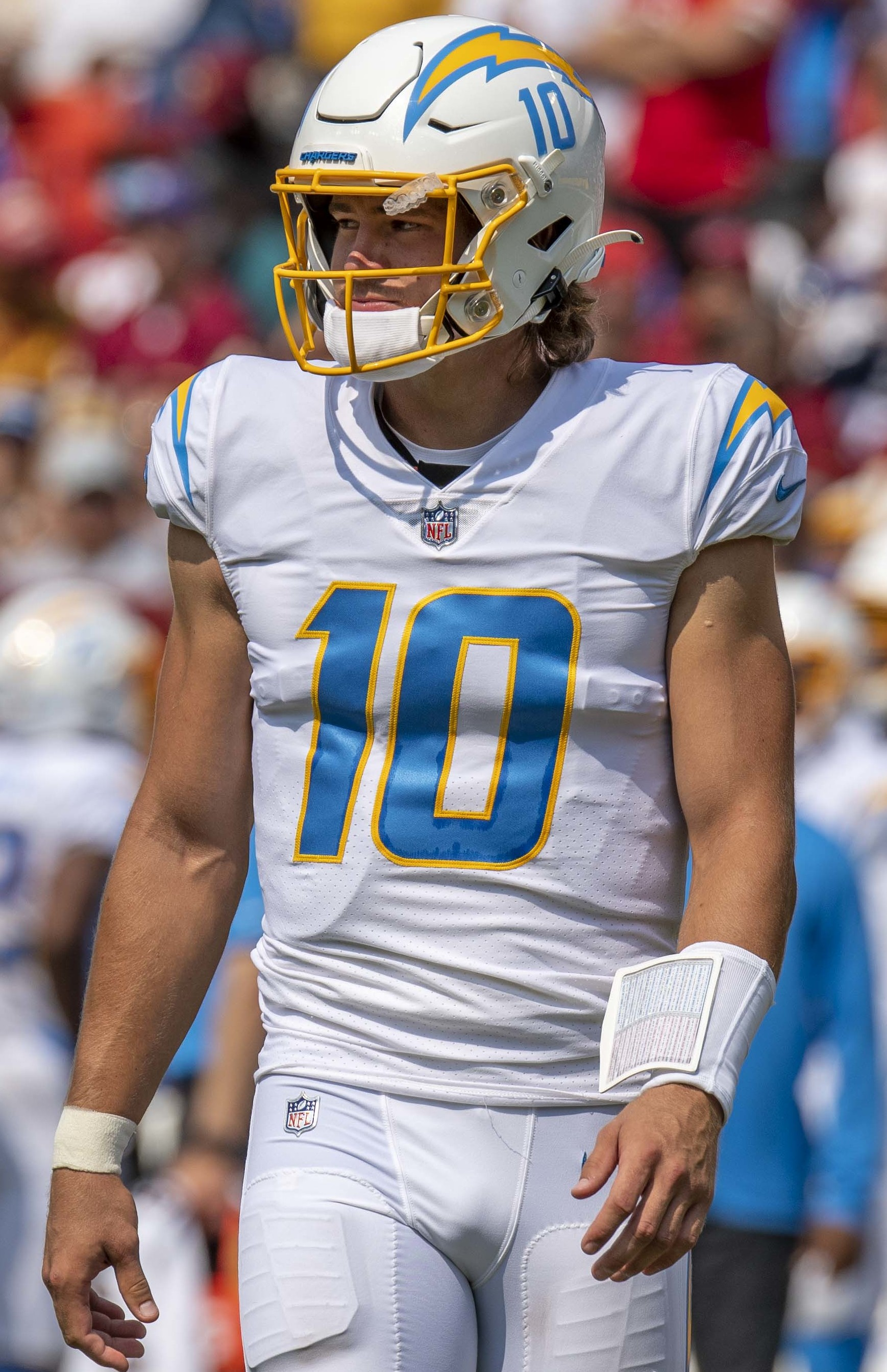
Justin Herbert, NFL quarterback

Herbert Hoover, 34th president of the United States

- Kevin Hagen (1928–2005) – actor
- Page Hamilton (born 1960) – musician
- Bill Hanley (rancher) (1910–1935) – pioneer rancher and wildlife conservation advocate
- Kathleen Hanna (born 1968) – singer, songwriter
- Tonya Harding (born 1970) – ice skater, boxer
- Katie Harman (born 1980) – Miss America 2002
- Gregory Harrison (born 1950) – actor, Trapper John, M.D.
- Oscar Harstad (1892–1985) – Major League Baseball pitcher
- Taylor Hart (born 1991) – defensive end for the Philadelphia Eagles
- Mark Hatfield (1922–2011) – Oregon legislator, secretary of state, governor and U.S. senator
- Scott Hatteberg (born 1969) – former MLB first baseman and catcher
- John Haughm (born 1975) – vocalist and guitarist for folk metal band Agalloch
- Carey Hayes (born 1961) – screenwriter
- Chad Hayes (born 1961) – screenwriter
- Todd Haynes (born 1961) – director
- Hazel P. Heath (1909–1998) – mayor, Homer, Alaska
- Jon Heder (born 1977) – actor
- Margaux Hemingway (1955–1996) – fashion model, actress and granddaughter of writer Ernest Hemingway
- Bobby Henderson – Pastafarian and prophet of the Church of the Flying Spaghetti Monster
- Justin Herbert (born 1998) – National Football League quarterback
- Howard Hesseman (born 1940) – actor, played disc jockey "Johnny Fever" on the television sitcom WKRP in Cincinnati
- Leah Hing (1907–2001) – pilot
- D.K. Holm (born 1953) – movie reviewer, Internet columnist, radio broadcaster, and author
- Herbert Hoover (1874–1964) – moved to Oregon at the age of eleven; 31st president of the United States (1929–1933)
- Nick Hundley (born 1983) – catcher for the Baltimore Orioles

== I ==
- Terri Irwin (born 1964) – naturalist and conservationist (with husband Steve Irwin)
- Lucie Fulton Isaacs (1841–1916) – writer, philanthropist, suffragist; member, Oregon Pioneer Association

== J ==
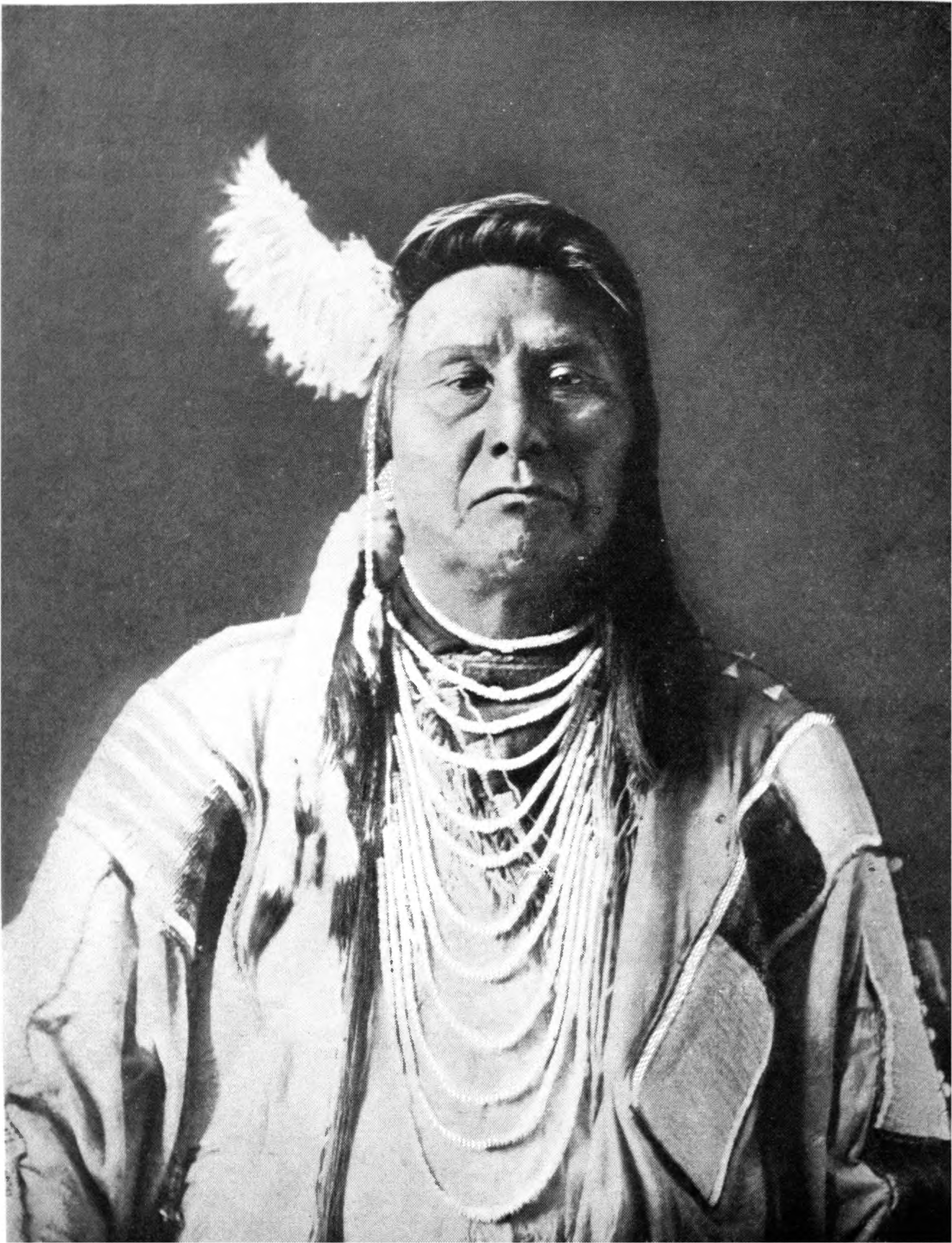
Chief Joseph, leader of the Wal-lam-wat-kain (Wallowa) band of Nez Perce

- Clifton James (1920–2017) – actor, best known for his roles as Sheriff J.W. Pepper alongside Roger Moore in two James Bond films
- Larry Jansen (1920–2009) – Major League Baseball pitcher and coach
- Margo Jennings (born 1945) – athletic coach
- Ethel Jewett (1877–1944) – actress
- Bill Johnson (1960–2016) – World Cup alpine ski racer
- June Jones (born 1953) – head football coach for Southern Methodist University
- Terrence Jones (born 1992) – basketball player for the Houston Rockets
- Chief Joseph (1840–1904) – chief of the Wal-lam-wat-kain (Wallowa) band of Nez Perce Native Americans

== K ==
- Mat Kearney (born 1978) – musician
- Barnaby Keeney (1914–1980) – president of Brown University
- Scott Kelly (born 1967) – musician Neurosis
- Shell Kepler (1958–2008) – actress
- Maude Kerns (1876–1965) – avant-garde visual artist
- Ken Kesey (1935–2001) – author
- Zach King (born 1990) – Youtube influencer
- Justin Kirk (born 1969) – actor
- John Kitzhaber (born 1947) – Oregon governor (1995–2003, 2011–2015)
- Phil Knight (born 1938) – founder of Nike
- Tonya Knight (born 1966) – IFBB professional bodybuilder
- Travis Knight (born 1973) – director and producer, son of Phil Knight
- A. Thomas Kraabel (1934–2016) – classics scholar
- Jon Krakauer (born 1954) – author and mountaineer
- Nicholas Kristof (born 1959) – Pulitzer Prize-winning journalist
- Taya Kyle (born 1974) – author, wife of Chris Kyle

== L ==
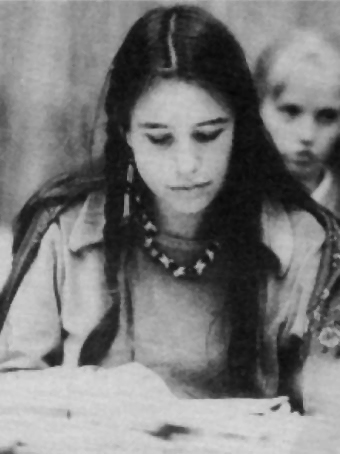
Winona LaDuke, Native American rights activist

- Winona LaDuke (born 1959) – Native American activist
- Alicia Lagano (born 1979) – actress
- Ben Hur Lampman (1886–1954) – journalist, essayist, Poet Laureate
- Frances Moore Lappé (born 1944) – author and activist
- Lars Larson (born 1959) – radio talk show host
- Ursula K. Le Guin (1929–2018) – author
- Barbara Coombs Lee (born 1947) – president of Compassion & Choices
- Hazel Ying Lee (1912–1944) – military pilot
- Marc Alan Lee (1978–2006) – first Navy SEAL to lose his life in Operation Iraqi Freedom
- Leonard Levy (1923–2006) – Pulitzer Prize winner
- Rian Lindell (born 1977) – NFL placekicker for the Buffalo Bills
- Matt Lindland (born 1970) – former MMA fighter, Olympic silver medalist in Greco-Roman wrestling
- Jon Lindstrom (born 1957) – actor, General Hospital, Port Charles
- Neil Lomax (born 1959) – NFL quarterback for St. Louis / Phoenix Cardinals
- Gary Loudermilk (born 1952) – radio personality, known as "Gary the Retard" in Howard Stern's Wack Pack
- Courtney Love (born 1964) – musician, actress
- Kevin Love (born 1987) – NBA basketball player for the Cleveland Cavaliers
- Jed Lowrie (born 1984) – infielder for the Houston Astros

== M ==
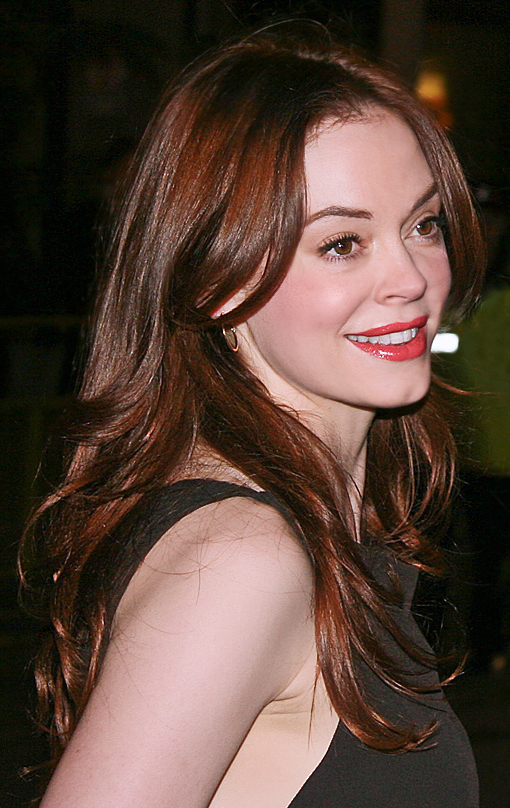
Rose McGowan, actress

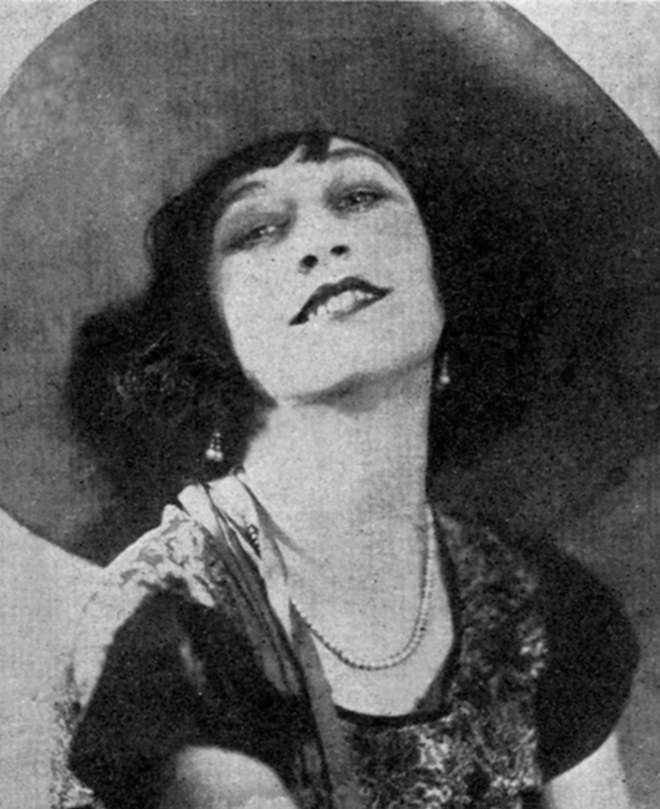
Lee Morse, jazz singer and guitarist

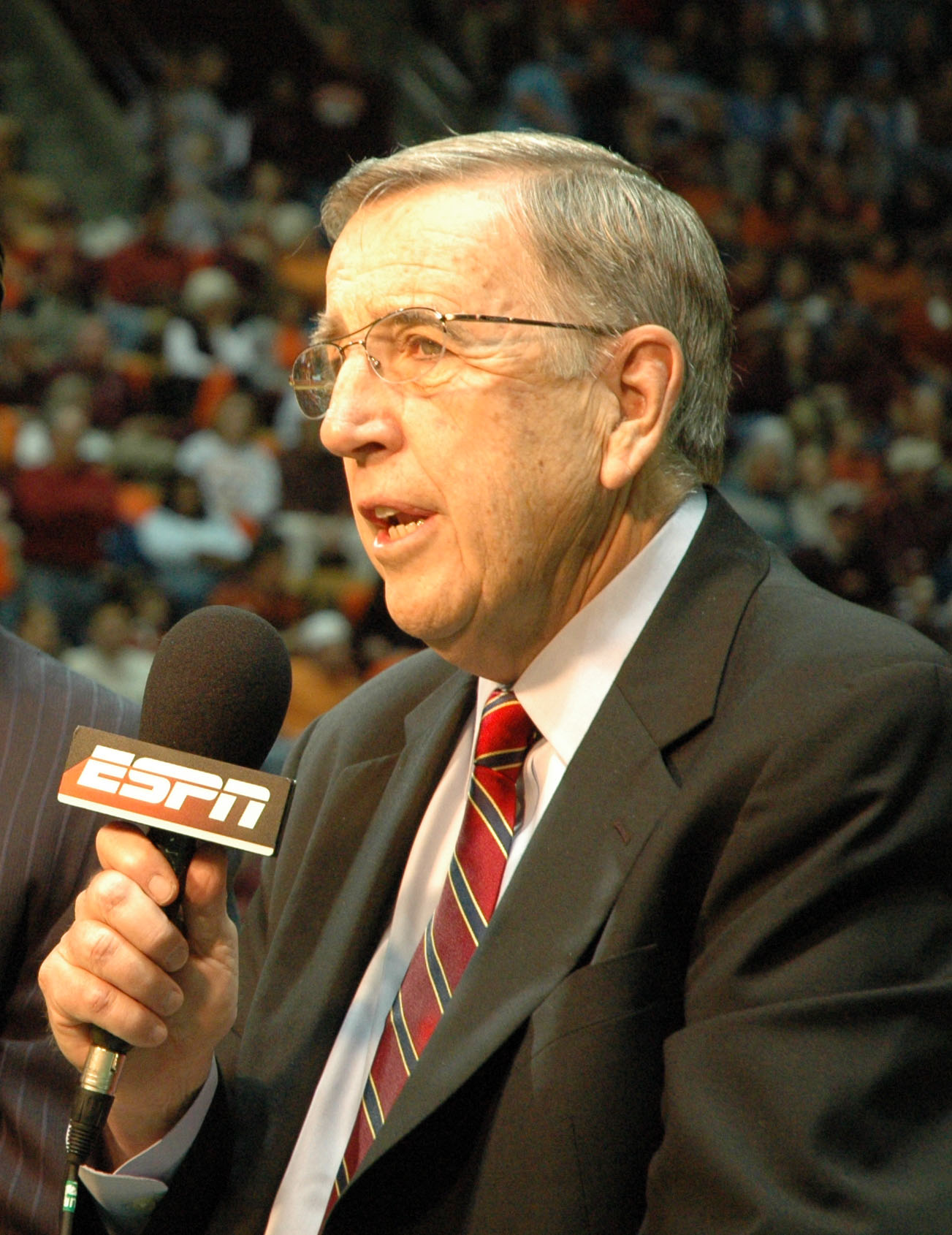
Brent Musburger

- Ranald MacDonald (1824–1894) – first man to teach the English language in Japan
- Holly Madison (born 1979) – former girlfriend of Playboy founder Hugh Hefner, model, television personality
- Dick Magruder (1946–1978) – rancher, lawyer, and politician
- Larry Mahan (born 1943) – six-time World All-Around Rodeo Champion cowboy
- Donald Malarkey (1921–2017) – World War II soldier
- Collin Malcolm (born 1997), basketball player for Hapoel Tel Aviv of the Israeli Basketball Premier League
- Bridget Marquardt (born 1973) – former girlfriend of Playboy founder Hugh Hefner, model, actress, television personality
- Richard Laurence Marquette (born 1934) – serial killer
- Jeron Mastrud (born 1987) – American NFL football player
- David Mayo (born 1991) – American NFL football player
- Lewis A. McArthur (1883–1951) – author of Oregon Geographic Names
- Tom McCall (1913–1983) – 30th governor of Oregon
- David McCord (1897–1997) – poet
- Rose McGowan (born 1973) – actress
- Dallas McKennon (1919–2009) – voice actor; voice of Gumby, Pokey, Archie Andrews, and Tony the Tiger
- Charles McNary (1874–1944) – U.S. senator, and 1940 republican U.S. vice presidential nominee
- Pat McQuistan (born 1983) – former NFL player (Dallas Cowboys, Miami Dolphins, New Orleans Saints, Arizona Cardinals, and Tennessee Titans)
- Paul McQuistan (born 1983) – former NFL player; 2013 Super Bowl winner with the Seattle Seahawks (also played with Oakland Raiders, Jacksonville Jaguars, and Cleveland Browns)
- Mayo Methot (1904–1951) – actress; third wife of Humphrey Bogart
- Charis Michelsen (born 1974) – actress and former model
- Quintin Mikell (born 1980) – safety for the Philadelphia Eagles
- Jourdan Miller (born 1993) – fashion model, America's Next Top Model winner
- Bob Mionske (born 1962) – attorney and former Olympic and professional bicycle racer
- Geoffrey Moore (born 1946) – high-technology consultant and author
- Joel Moore (born 1977) – actor
- Walt Morey (1907–1992) – author
- Lee Morse (1897–1954) – jazz and blues singer/songwriter, Broadway actress, and guitar player
- Macy Morse (1921–2019) – peace activist
- Ona Munson (1903–1955) – actress
- Dale Murphy (born 1956) – former Major League Baseball player
- Brent Musburger (born 1939) – CBS, ABC, ESPN sportscaster

== N ==
- Legedu Naanee (born 1983) – National Football League wide receiver for the San Diego Chargers
- James Nesmith (1820–1885) – pioneer, lawyer, and politician
- John Strong Newberry (1822–1892) – geologist, physician, explorer, and author
- Mickey Newbury (1973–2002) – songwriter
- Chester Newton (1903–1966) – Olympic silver medalist in freestyle wrestling
- William A. Niskanen (1933–2011) – economist
- Kim Novak (born 1933) – actress

== O ==
- Austin O'Brien (born 1981) – actor
- Owamagbe Odighizuwa (born 1992) – defensive end for the New York Giants
- Jack Ohman (born 1960) – editorial cartoonist for The Oregonian
- Robert T. Oliver (1909-2000) – scholar of intercultural communication
- Musse Olol – social activist
- Eric Christian Olsen (born 1977) – actor
- George Olsen (1893–1971) – drummer and prolific bandleader
- Kaitlin Olson (born 1975) – actress
- Bethenia Angelina Owens-Adair (1840–1926) – activist, physician

== P ==
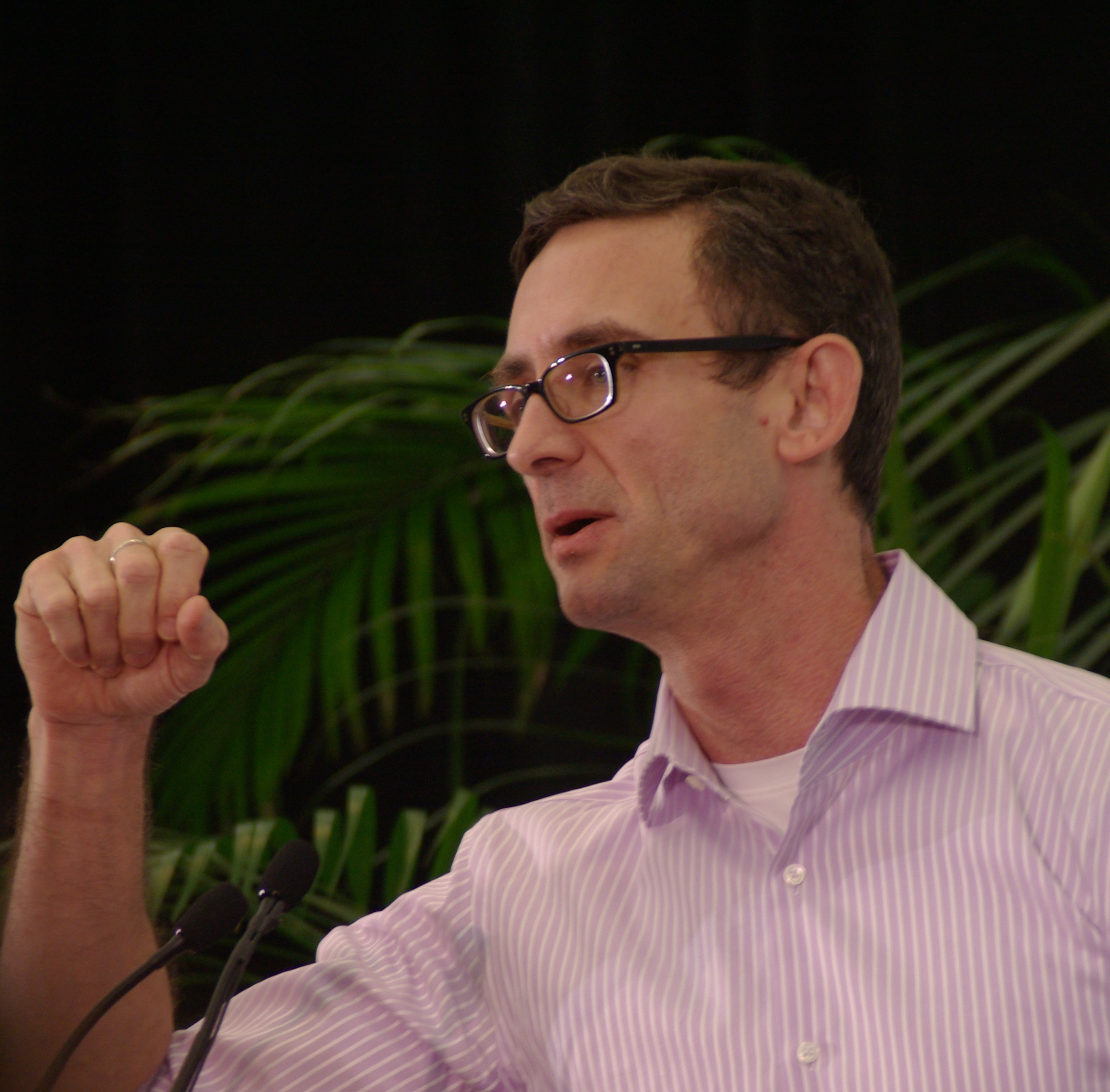
Chuck Palahniuk, author

- Bob Packwood (1932–2026) – United States Senator and Chairman of the Senate Finance Committee
- Bettie Page (1923–2008) – pin-up model
- Chuck Palahniuk (born 1961) – journalist, author
- Mark Parent (born 1961) – former Major League Baseball catcher
- Tom Parrott (1868–1932) – professional baseball player
- Ken Patera (born 1943) – professional wrestler, Olympic weightlifter, and strongman competitor
- Chief Paulina (died 1867) – leader of the Hunipuitöka band of Northern Paiute Native Americans
- Linus Pauling (1901–1994) – chemist and activist; only person to win two Nobel Prizes outright
- Bill Pearl (born 1930) – world champion bodybuilder
- Alfred Peet (1920–2007) – founder of Peet's Coffee & Tea
- Kari Ann Peniche (born 1984) – actress
- Jack Pennick (1895–1964) – actor
- Tom Peterson (1930–2016) – home appliance retailer and television pitchman
- Kim M. Peyton-McDonald (1957–1986) – gold medalist from 1976 Summer Olympics; Oregon Sports Hall of Fame inductee
- Julianne Phillips (born 1960) – actress; ex-wife of Bruce Springsteen
- River Phoenix (1970–1993) – actor, musician, and activist
- Mitch Pileggi (born 1952) – actor
- Henry Pittock (1835–1919) – pioneer; founder and publisher of The Oregonian
- Bill Plympton (born 1946) – animator, graphic designer, and cartoonist
- Troy Polamalu (born 1981) – strong safety for the Pittsburgh Steelers
- Elias Porter (1914–1987) – psychologist
- Norris Poulson (1895–1982) – 36th mayor of Los Angeles
- Jane Powell (born 1929) – actress
- Steve Prefontaine (1951–1975) – track athlete
- Megan Prelinger (born 1967) – cultural historian, archivist
- Maudie Prickett (1914–1976) – actress

== R ==
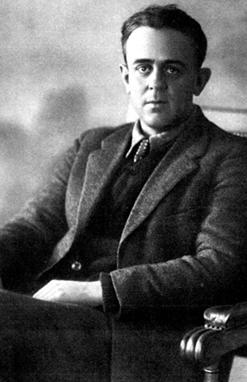
John Reed, journalist

- Ruth Radelet (born 1982) – musician, lead singer of Chromatics
- Ahmad Rashad (born 1949) – college and National Football League player and sportscaster
- Johnnie Ray (1927–1990) – singer, songwriter
- Susan Raye (born 1944) – country singer
- John Reed (1887–1920) – journalist and Bolshevik activist
- Robin Reed (1899–1978) – Olympic gold medalist in freestyle wrestling
- Holiday Reinhorn (born 1967) – fiction writer; married to actor Rainn Wilson
- Mike Remmers (born 1989) – offensive tackle for the New York Giants
- Harold Reynolds (born 1960) – Major League Baseball player; television analyst
- Kim Rhodes (born 1969) – actress and singer
- Mike Rich (born 1959) – screenwriter
- Anna Rankin Riggs (1835–1908) – social reformer
- Jenelle Riley (born 1972) – journalist, screenwriter
- Mike Riley (born 1953) – football player for Alabama Crimson Tide and Nebraska Cornhuskers head coach
- Lisa Rinna (born 1963) – actress
- Terry Robb (born 1956) – fingerstyle guitarist
- Cathy McMorris Rodgers (born 1969) – U.S. representative, chair of the House Republican Conference
- Dante Rosario (born 1984) – tight end for the Chicago Bears
- Terrence Ross (born 1991) – NBA player for the Toronto Raptors
- Zac Rosscup (born 1988) – pitcher for the Chicago Cubs
- Mark Rothko (1903–1970) – Latvian expressionist artist
- Aaron Rowand (born 1977) – MLB player for San Francisco Giants and Chicago White Sox
- Burt Rutan (born 1943) – aerospace engineer
- Ad Rutschman (born 1931) – football and baseball coach at Linfield College
- Susan Ruttan (born 1948) – actress

== S ==
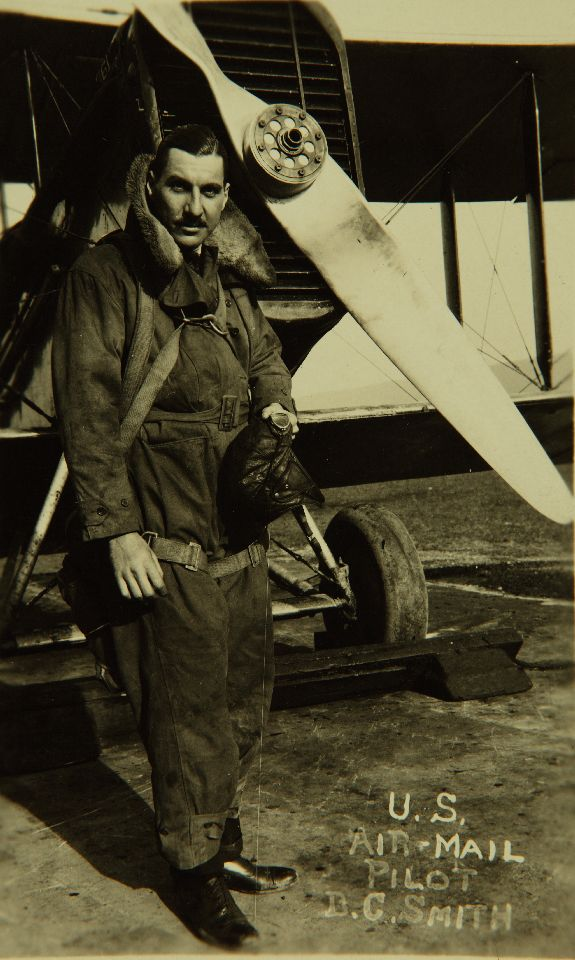
Dean Smith, pilot

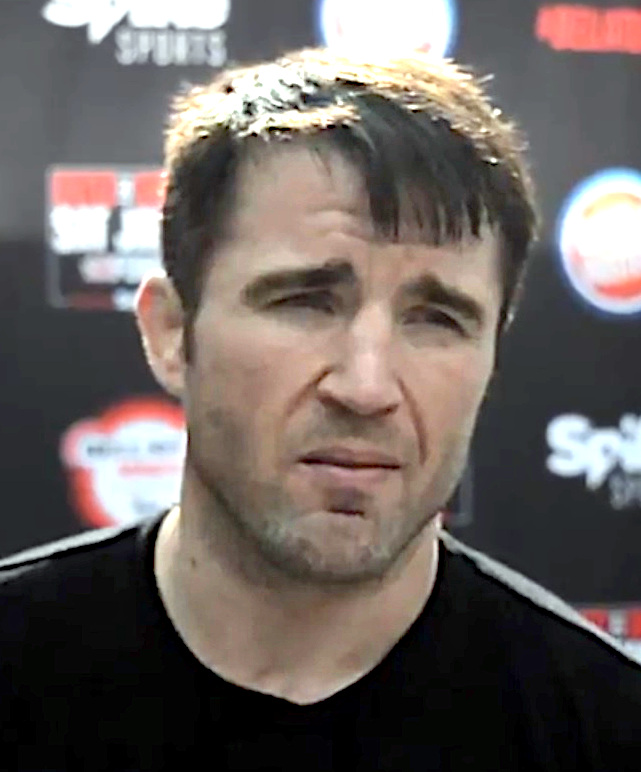
Chael Sonnen, MMA fighter, promoter, and analyst

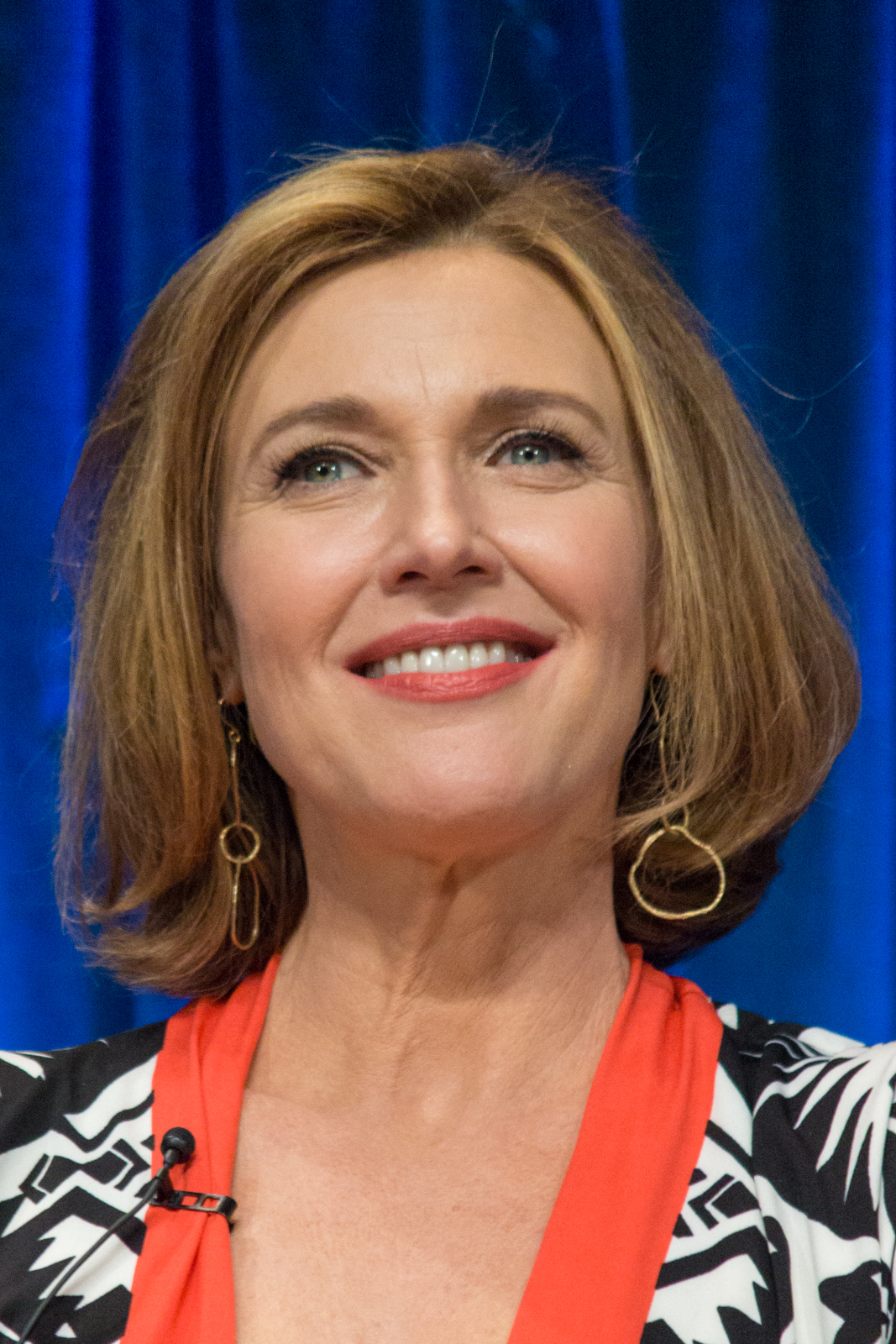
Brenda Strong, actress

- Domantas Sabonis (born 1996) – basketball player for the NBA Sacramento Kings
- Mendel Sachs (1927–2012) – theoretical physicist
- Katee Sackhoff (born 1980) – actress
- Curtis Salgado (born 1954) – blues, rhythm and blues, and soul singer and harmonica player
- Rick Sanders (1945–1972) – two-time Olympic silver medalist and world champion in freestyle wrestling
- Rebecca Schaeffer (1967–1989) – actress
- Shoni Schimmel (born 1992) – WNBA player with the Atlanta Dream
- Les Schwab (1917–2007) – businessman
- Dale Scott (born 1959) – Major League Baseball umpire
- Daniel Seavey (born 1999) – musician, singer-songwriter, and contestant on American Idol season 14
- Doc Severinsen (born 1927) – trumpeter, bandleader on The Tonight Show
- Martha Allen Sherwood (1948– 2020) – lichenologist
- Kyle Singler (born 1988) – small forward for the Oklahoma City Thunder
- Sonny Sixkiller – former Washington Huskies quarterback; actor
- Alek Skarlatos (born 1992) – Oregon Army National Guardsman specialist known for stopping a gunman in a Paris-bound train from Amsterdam via Brussels; contestant on Dancing with the Stars season 21
- Matt Slauson (born 1986) – guard for the Chicago Bears
- Bill Smith (1928–2018) – Olympic gold medalist in freestyle wrestling
- Dean Smith (1899–1987) – pioneer pilot
- Elliott Smith (1969–2003) – musician
- Chael Sonnen (born 1977) – mixed martial artist, competed in the UFC
- Esperanza Spalding (born 1984) – jazz musician
- Erik Spoelstra (born 1970) – head coach for the Miami Heat
- Mary Jane Spurlin (1883–1970) – Oregon's first female judge
- Ralph Stackpole (1885–1973) – visual artist
- Colleen Stan (born 1956) – kidnapping victim, activist
- William Gladstone Steel (1883–1934) – conservationist, known as the "father of Crater Lake"
- Dorothy Hester Stenzel (1910–1991) – record-breaking stunt pilot
- Ryan Stevenson (born 1979) – musician
- David Ogden Stiers (1942–2018) – actor
- Eric A. Stillwell (born 1962) – screenwriter and producer
- Kimberley Strassel (born 1972) – author, member of The Wall Street Journal editorial board
- Robert W. Straub (1920–2002) – governor of Oregon
- Brenda Strong (born 1960) – actress
- Sally Struthers (born 1948) – actress
- Drew Struzan (born 1947) – artist
- Ndamukong Suh (born 1987) – defensive tackle for the Los Angeles Rams
- William L. Sullivan (born 1953) – author of outdoor guide books
- Robert S. Summers (1933-2019) – legal scholar specializing in jurisprudence, commercial contracts, and comparative law

== T ==
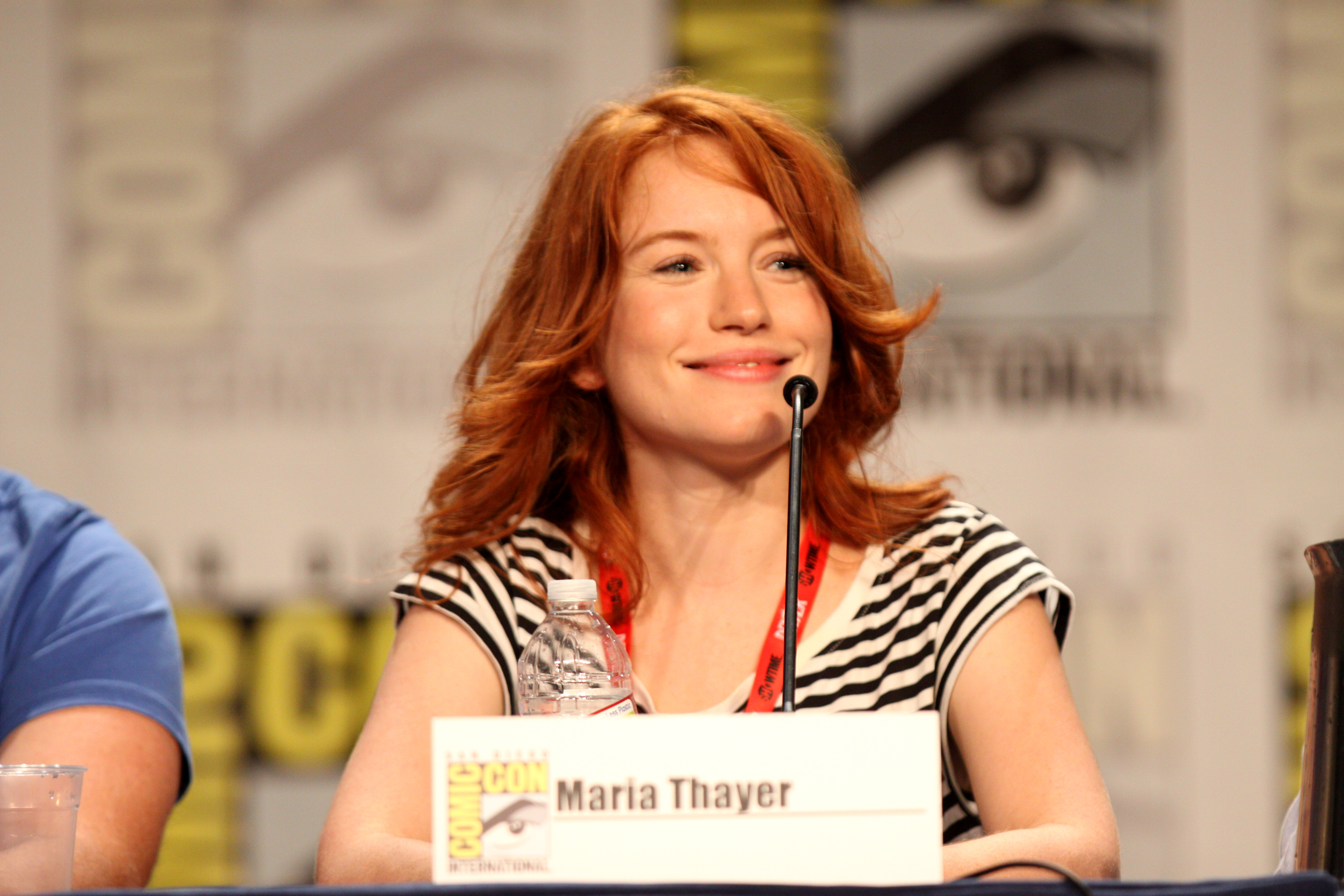
Maria Thayer, actress

- Jack Tafari (1946–2016) – housing-rights activist
- Ruth Taylor (1905–1984) – actress
- Tecumtum – American Indian chief (died 1864)
- Maria Thayer (born 1975) – actress
- Tommy Thayer (born 1960) – musician, lead guitarist of Kiss
- Inga Thompson (born 1968) – professional bicycle racer
- Andy Tillman (born 1952) – llama rancher, businessman, and author
- Barrett Tillman (born 1948) – novelist and military historian
- Kevin Towers (1961–2018) – general manager for the Arizona Diamondbacks
- April Genevieve Tucholke – young adult novelist
- Corin Tucker (born 1972) – musician, guitarist

== U ==
- Ime Udoka (born 1977) – small forward for the San Antonio Spurs
- Sara Jean Underwood (born 1984) – Playboy Playmate of the Year 2007, model, actress

== V ==
- Richard VanGrunsven (born 1939) – homebuilt aircraft designer
- Gus Van Sant (born 1952) – director
- Paige VanZant (born 1994) – mixed martial artist
- Laura Veirs (born 1973) – folk singer-songwriter
- Will Vinton (1947–2018) – director and producer

== W ==
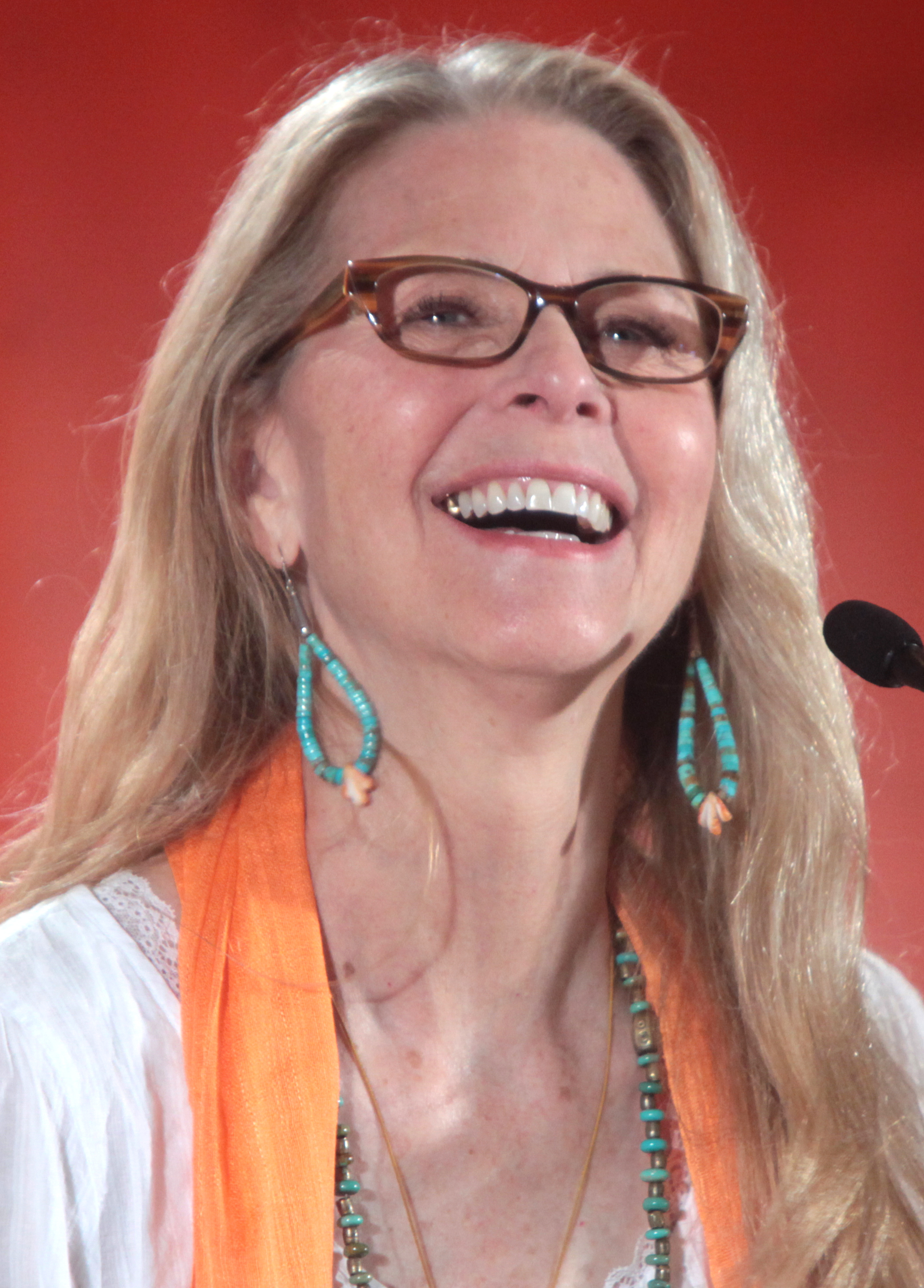
Lindsay Wagner, actress

- Lindsay Wagner (born 1949) – actress
- Madge Morris Wagner (1862–1924) – poet and journalist
- Don Wakamatsu (born 1963) – bench coach for the Kansas City Royals
- Neale Donald Walsch (born 1943) – author
- Don Walsh (born 1931) – oceanographer, explorer
- Bill Warren (1943–2016) – film historian
- Craig Wasson (born 1954) – actor
- Michael Waterman (born 1942) – scientist
- Dominic Waters (born 1986) – basketball player in the Israel Basketball Premier League
- Connor Weil (born 1994) – actor
- Bob Welch – author and columnist
- John West (1809–1888) – Scottish captain and inventor
- Oswald West (1873–1960) – 14th governor of Oregon
- Opal Whiteley (1897–1992) – nature writer and diarist
- Dave Wiegand – winner of 2005 and 2009 National Scrabble championship
- Carl Wieman (born 1951) – physicist, winner of 2001 Nobel Prize in Physics laureate
- Dave Wilcox (born 1942) – Hall of Fame linebacker with the San Francisco 49ers
- Edy Williams (born 1942) – film and television actress
- Mitch Williams (born 1964) – Major League Baseball relief pitcher, studio analyst for MLB Network
- Bridgette Wilson (born 1973) – actress, singer and model
- Nancy Wilson (born 1954) – musician, Heart
- Kyle Wiltjer (born 1992) – player for the Houston Rockets
- Henry Hope Wong (1900–?) – pioneer pilot
- Basil Wolverton (1909–1978) – cartoonist, writer
- Renn Woods (born 1958) – actress
- Anthony Wynn (born 1962) – author

== Y ==
- Minoru Yasui (1916–1986) – lawyer and civil rights activist
- Yeat (born 2000) – rapper

== Z ==
- John Zerzan (born 1943) – anthropologist and anarchist writer

== See also ==
- List of Oregon suffragists

By city

- List of people from Bend, Oregon
- List of people from Eugene, Oregon
- List of people from Hillsboro, Oregon
- List of people from Portland, Oregon

By public office

- List of governors of Oregon
- List of Oregon judges
- List of presidents of the Oregon State Senate
- List of speakers of the Oregon House of Representatives
- List of United States representatives from Oregon
- List of United States senators from Oregon

By educational institution affiliation

- List of Oregon State University alumni
- List of Oregon State University faculty and staff
- List of Reed College people
- List of University of Oregon alumni
- List of University of Oregon faculty and staff
- List of Willamette University alumni
