= List of people from Eugene, Oregon =

The following is a partial list of notable residents, past and present, from Eugene, Oregon, United States. A separate list of people from Oregon is available.

== Artists ==
- Oliver L. Barrett (1892–1943), sculptor and educator
- Tracy Bonham, musician
- Deedee Cheriel, painter, musician, award-winning set decorator, filmmaker
- Emily Kokal, musician
- Taravat Talepasand, artist
- Olga Volchkova, cast-glass sculptor, icon painter
- Michelle Zauner, musician and author

== Athletes ==
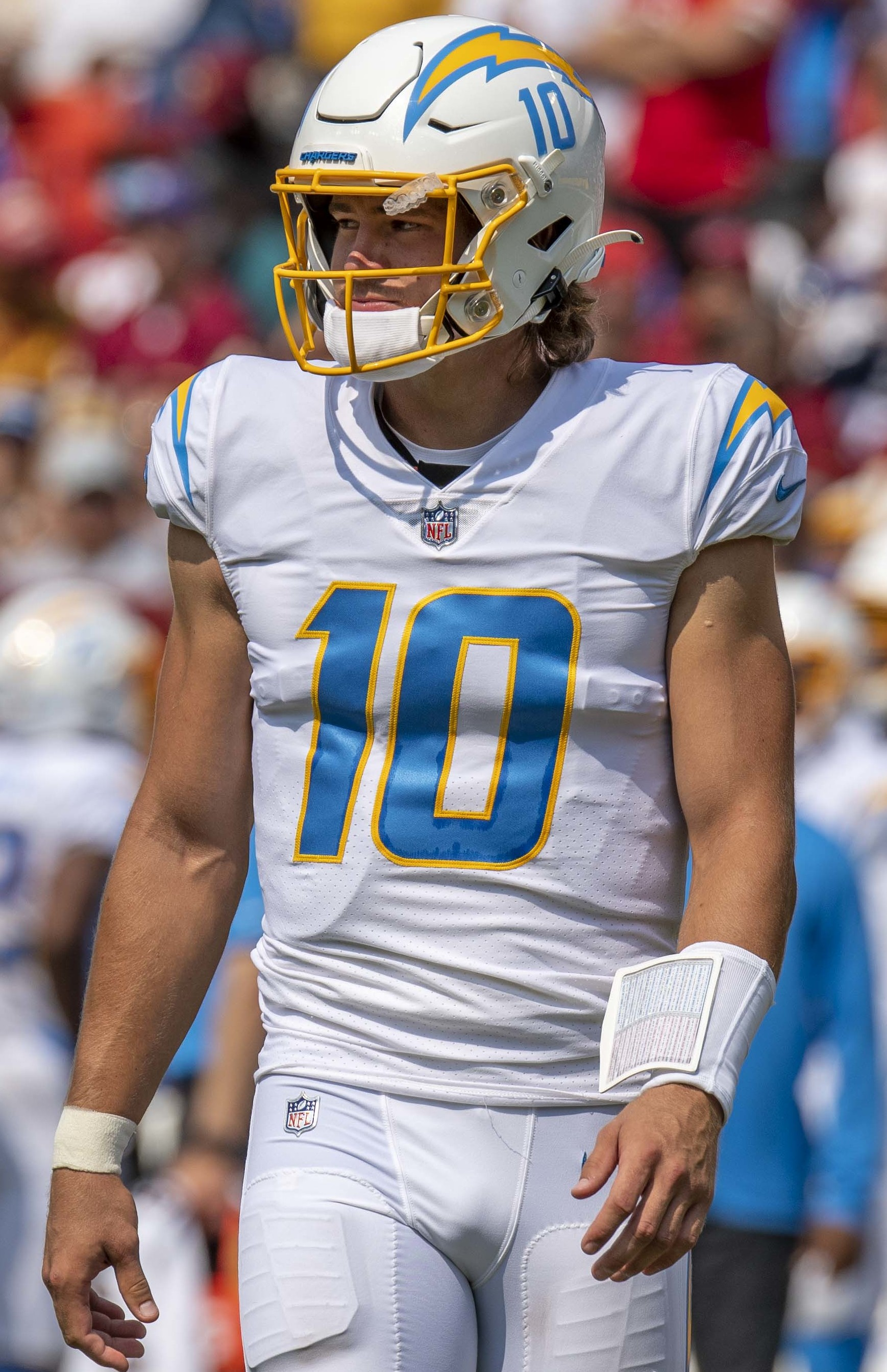
NFL quarterback Justin Herbert

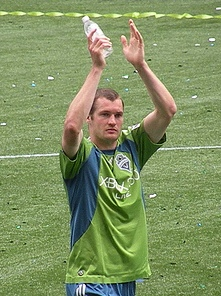
Soccer player Nate Jaqua

- Danny Ainge, North Eugene High School (1977), NBA player, coach and team executive
- Jon Anderson, Olympian, 1973 Boston Marathon winner
- Alex Brink, Canadian Football League quarterback
- C. J. Brown, soccer player and coach
- Gregory Byrne, athletics director at the University of Alabama
- Todd Christensen, Sheldon High School (1974), Los Angeles Raiders NFL tight end
- Brian Conklin, professional basketball player for Limoges CSP of the LNB Pro A
- Mary Decker, middle-distance runner, two-time world champion, member of National Track and Field Hall of Fame
- Ashton Eaton, decathlete, five-time world champion, two-time Olympic gold medalist
- Dan Fouts, University of Oregon (1970–72), San Diego Chargers (NFL) quarterback, Pro Football Hall of Famer, TV commentator
- Justin Herbert, Sheldon High School (Oregon), University of Oregon (2016–19), Los Angeles Chargers (NFL) quarterback, Rose Bowl MVP
- Cyrus Hostetler, javelin thrower, Pan American Games silver medalist
- Luke Jackson, University of Oregon, NBA player, basketball coach at Northwest Christian University
- Nate Jaqua, South Eugene High School (2000), Seattle Sounders striker
- Jordan Kent, Churchill High School, University of Oregon three-sport star, son of UO coach Ernie Kent, wide receiver Seattle Seahawks (NFL)
- Matt LaBounty, Oregon, 49ers, Packers, and Seahawks NFL defensive end
- Casey Martin, professional golfer, University of Oregon golf coach
- Bill McChesney, University of Oregon distance runner, 1980 Olympic team member
- Quintin Mikell, Willamette High School, Philadelphia Eagles (NFL) defensive back

== Authors ==
- George Hitchcock (1914–2010), poet and publisher of the literary journal Kayak
- Frog (died 2024), writer and vendor of joke books

== Entertainment ==
- Rose McGowan, actress, grew up in Eugene
- Rebecca Schaeffer, actress, born and raised in Eugene

== Others ==
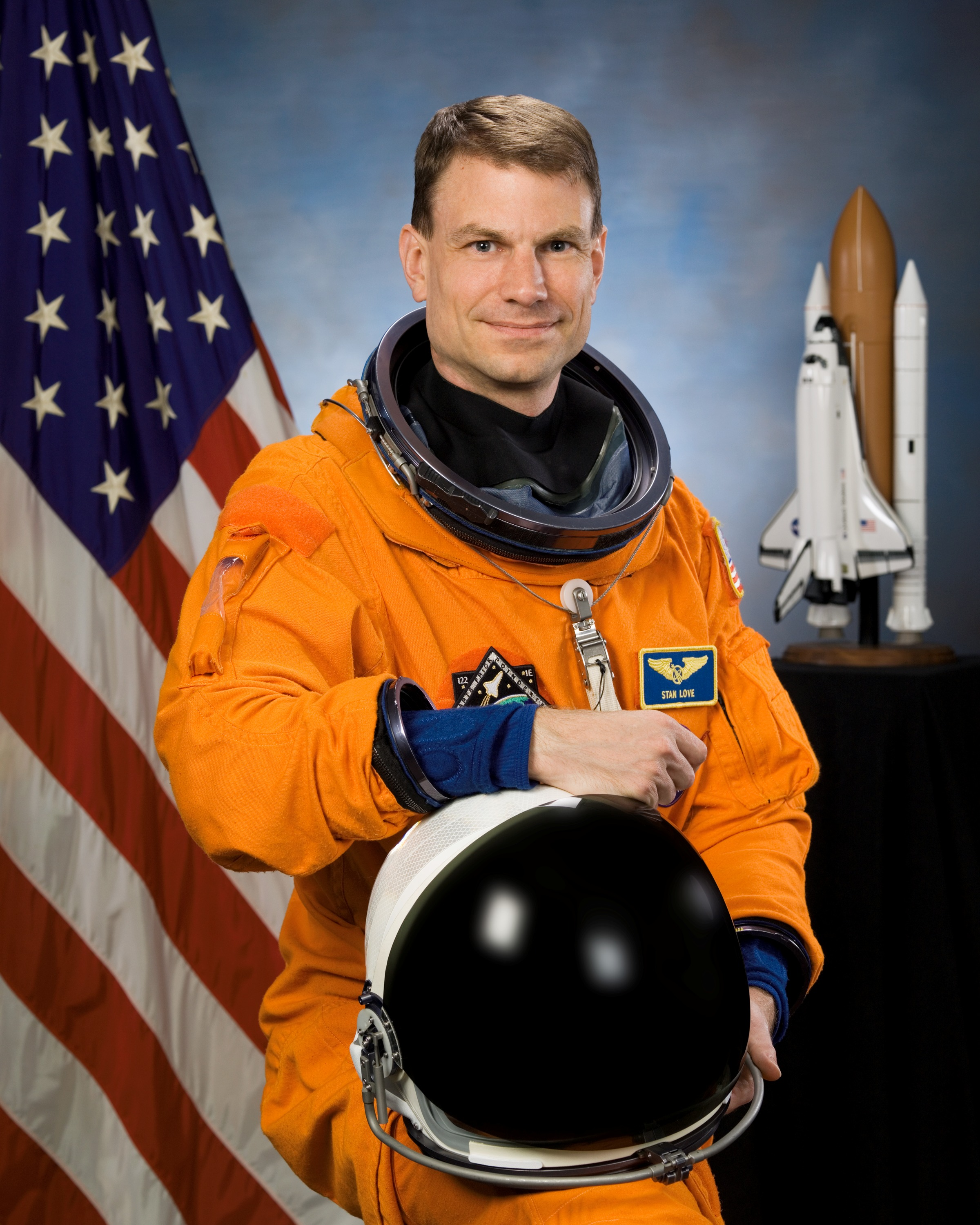
Astronaut Stanley G. Love

- Creed C. Hammond, major general and Chief of the National Guard Bureau
- Jack Herer, cannabis activist, author
- Eugene Lazowski, Polish physician, saved 8,000 people by creating a fake typhus epidemic in World War II
- Stanley G. Love, astronaut
- Georgia Mason, botanist and herbarium curator
- Joan Mondale (1930–2014), second lady of the United States
- Martha Allen Sherwood (1948– 2020), lichenologist
- Terri Irwin, Conservationist

== See also ==
- List of people from Oregon
- Lists of Oregon-related topics
