= Zerzan =

Zerzan (Zerzán, feminine: Zerzánová) is a Czech surname. Notable people with the surname include:

- Greg Zerzan, American politician and lawyer
- John Zerzan (born 1943), American philosopher and author
