= Patricia Price =

American pianist

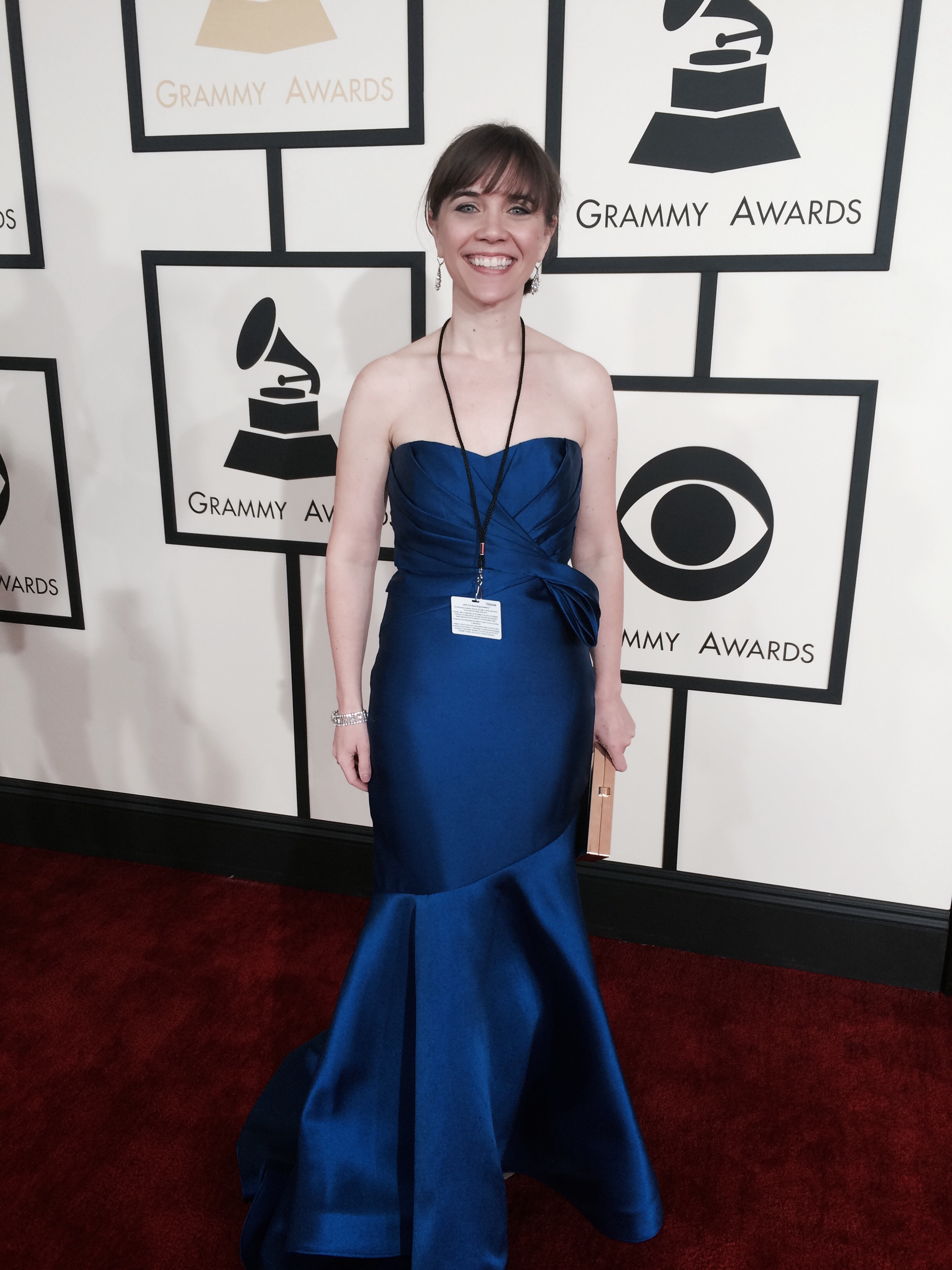
- Education: Willamette University
- Occupations: Entrepreneur, musician
- Years active: 2000s–present

Patricia Price is managing director and co-founder of the public relations and digital marketing firm 8VA Music Consultancy. Price was previously the executive director of Portland Piano International and the Classical Product Manager for Allegro Media Group managing classical record labels.

== Career ==
Price studied at Willamette University where she received her Bachelor of Music in piano performance and Bachelor of Arts in philosophy in 2004. After graduating she was awarded a Fulbright Assistantship to study and work in Vienna, Austria for one year. After her return, Price worked at Allegro Media group for five years where she managed the classical division and acted as executive producer on albums. She received her MBA from Willamette in 2009 and that same year became executive director of Portland Piano International, a nonprofit organization which presents recitals featuring pianists such as Murray Perahia and Vladimir Feltsman, in addition to providing piano classes.

In 2012, Price founded 8VA Music Consultancy (previously the New York branch of Inverne Price Music Consultancy) with James Inverne. 8VA is public relations and digital marketing firm for classical musicians and organizations whose clients include Lang Lang, Anne Akiko Meyers, Beijing Music Festival, and Shanghai Symphony Orchestra. In December 2018, The New York Observer named 8VA one of "The Most Powerful Entertainment and Media PR Firms of 2018." In January 2019, Price was a featured "Inspired Woman" in clothing brand J.Jill's Rhythm & Blues campaign.

In Match 2024, The New York Observer recognized 8VA again as one "The Top PR Firms for the Performing Arts" for the year 2024.
