= Georgia Mason =

American botanist

Georgia Mason (March 16, 1910 - October 8, 2007) was a botanist at the University of Oregon and author of Guide to the Plants of the Wallowa Mountains of Northeastern Oregon, and Plants of Wet to Moist Habitats in and Around Eugene Oregon.

== Biography ==
Georgia Mason was born Georgia Mavropoulos in West Orange, New Jersey, the daughter of Greek immigrants, Peter and Bessie Mavropoulos. She taught grades 1 through 7 in New Jersey public schools from 1931-1941. It was during this time, that she changed her name to Mason for easier pronunciation. From 1941 through 1958, she taught science courses to grades 6 through 9.

Mason was awarded a National Science Foundation grant to study for a Master of Science degree at Oregon State College (now Oregon State University) in Corvallis, Oregon. She started classes in 1958 at the age of 49, and graduated in 1960. She stayed in Oregon for the rest of her life.

She began collecting herbarium specimens in 1959 and began focusing on the flora of the Wallowa Mountains in 1960, working in the herbarium at Oregon State College. She served as Acting Assistant Curator of the UO Herbarium in Eugene from 1961–62, during the sabbatical of the curator, LeRoy Detling. In the late 1960s, she worked on her specimens from the Arizona State University herbarium. After Detling's death in 1970, she was hired as the curator at University of Oregon. She served in this position until retirement in 1976. Post retirement, she taught adult education courses in botany at Lane Community College in Eugene, and led native plant walks.

Guide to the Plants of the Wallowa Mountains of Northeastern Oregon was first published by the University of Oregon in 1975. Plants of Wet to Moist Habitats in and Around Eugene Oregon. was self-published in 1983. She founded an endowment for student work in the herbarium at Oregon State University in 1978.

In all, Mason donated 4,549 specimens to Oregon herbaria, fourth-most of Oregon collectors as of 2010. She also collected in Washington, Wyoming, and Nebraska. While curator at UO, she also mounted, labelled and accessioned roughly 3,000 specimens collected by Oregon botanist Lilla Leach; incorporated the approximately 3,800 collections of Eugene collector Orlin Ireland; formally accessioned hundreds of specimens; and updated names on hundreds of herbarium sheets in accordance with the 1973 "Flora of the Pacific Northwest" (Hitchcock and Cronquist) and other new floral references.
