= Greg Zerzan =

American politician

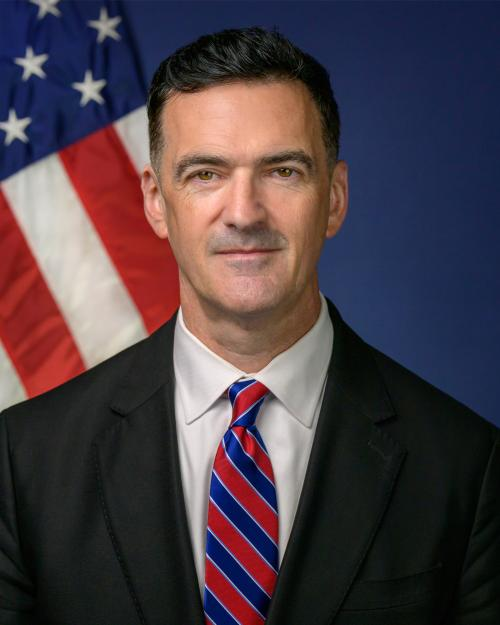
Gregory Zerzan serves as the 25th General Counsel of the U.S. Department of Transportation.

Gregory Zerzan is an attorney and former acting assistant secretary of the U.S Treasury under President George W. Bush. He has held several prominent posts in government and is a frequent speaker on markets and public policy matters.

== Early life and education ==
Zerzan is the youngest son of Charles J. Zerzan Jr. and Joan Kathan Zerzan. Charles Zerzan, Jr. was a noted physician and decorated military officer; Zerzan's grandfather, Charles Zerzan Sr., was likewise a distinguished U.S. Army veteran. Joan Zerzan was a noted Oregonian widely respected for an array of talents. Zerzan grew up in Portland, Oregon, and attended both undergraduate and law school at Willamette University in Salem, Oregon. While at Willamette, he worked in the Oregon State Legislature as an aid to various members of the state House and Senate. He was a member of the Delta Zeta chapter of the Sigma Chi Fraternity and alumnus of the Order of Triple Omega.

== Professional ==
Zerzan has worked in several prominent positions in the U.S. government, starting with his service as counsel and general counsel to the U.S. House Committee on Agriculture. He later became senior counsel to the House Committee on Banking, and the House Committee on Financial Services. In these positions, he was instrumental in helping create legislation such as the Commodity Futures Modernization Act, the Gramm-Leach-Bliley Act, and the Sarbanes-Oxley Act.

In March 2003, Zerzan was appointed deputy assistant secretary for Financial Institutions Policy in the Administration of President George W. Bush. Later Zerzan became acting assistant secretary of the Treasury for Financial Institutions. While at the U.S. Treasury Zerzan was one of the foremost proponents of reform of the Government Sponsored Enterprises, early on calling for regulatory improvements to limit the systemic risk the entities posed to the US financial system. Zerzan was also a strong proponent of tax cuts and reducing the size of US government programs, which he felt posed an unacceptable risk to U.S. taxpayers. Zerzan also oversaw the office of Terrorism Risk Insurance Program, and was responsible for managing the implementation of the Terrorism Risk Insurance Act.

After leaving the U.S. government, Zerzan became counsel and head of global public policy for ISDA, which is the financial trade association that oversees the over-the-counter derivatives industry. In this position, Zerzan worked with government and industry leaders around the world to help manage policy related to privately negotiated risk management contracts.

Zerzan frequently testified before the United States Congress and appears on television and in print discussing matters related to markets and U.S. government policy. Zerzan is also a senior fellow at the law school of the University of Melbourne, Australia. Zerzan serves on the board of Cure SMA, a non-profit dedicated to finding a cure for Spinal Muscular Atrophy. He is also a board member of the Commodity Markets Council, a trade association serving members of the commodity derivatives marketplace. Zerzan formerly was a director at Koch Industries and served as counsel to the Committee on Energy and Commerce of the U.S. House of Representatives. In March 2019 Zerzan was appointed Deputy Solicitor of the U.S. Department of the Interior. He played a key role in managing the legal operations of the department, including defending the decision to keep National Parks open during the December 2018-January 2019 U.S. government shutdown.

In November 2018, Zerzan was appointed to serve on the National Security Commission on Artificial Intelligence.
