= Andy Tillman =

Founder of Ilama industry

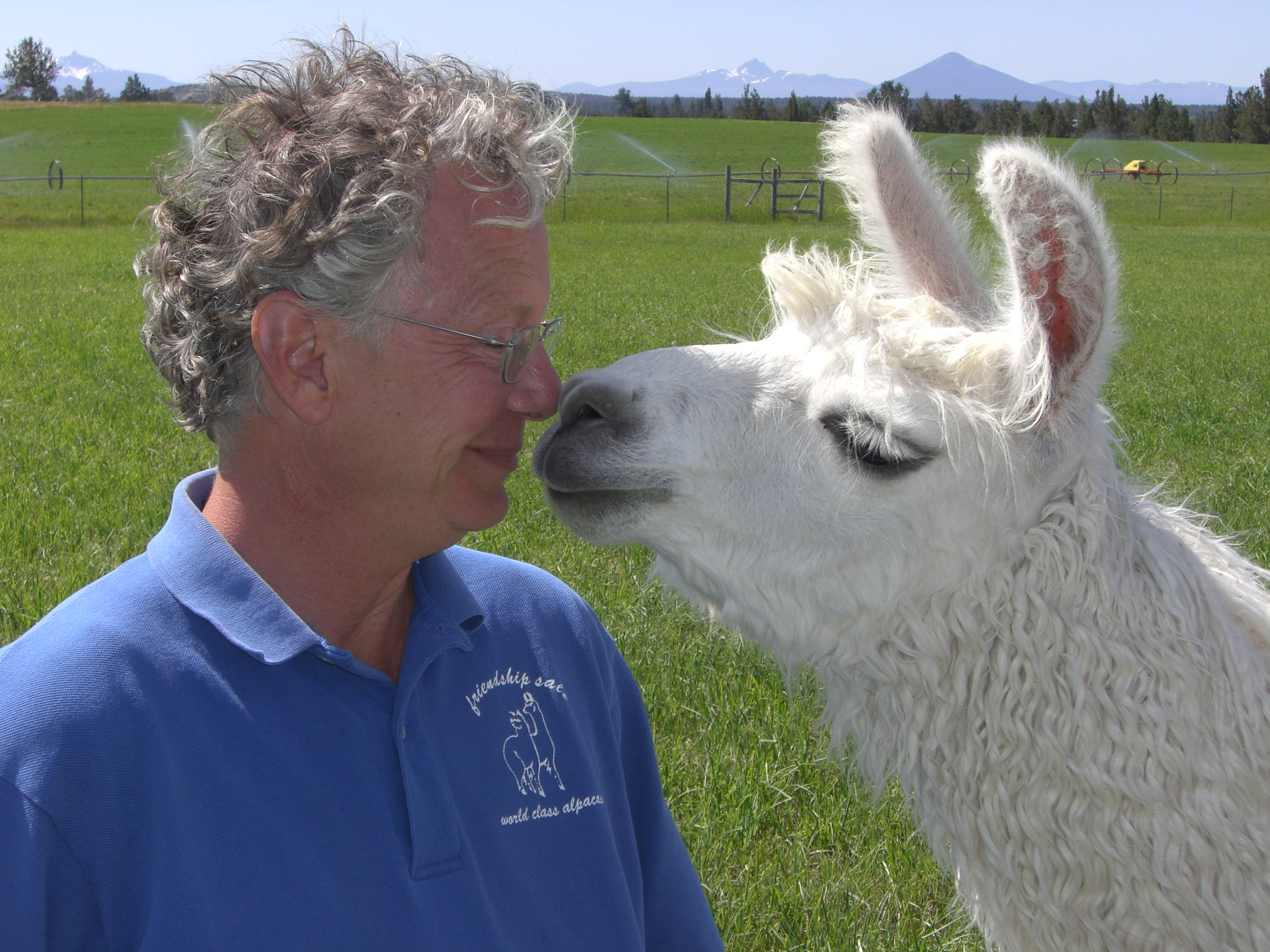
- Andy Tillman and llama friend
- Born: 1952 (age 73–74)
- Occupations: Llama rancher, businessman, and author
- Spouse(s): Dr. Cheryl Tillman, D.V.M.
- Relatives: Barrett Tillman
- Writing career
- Notable work: Speechless Brothers

Andrew Charles Tillman (born 1952) is one of the founders of the llama industry in the United States. He is an expert on llama and alpaca health, selective breeding, and marketing. Tillman is the co-founder of the International Llama Association, and he wrote the halter-class guidelines for the American Llama Show Association. His book, Speechless Brothers, was the first comprehensive study of llama husbandry published in the United States.

== Early life ==
Tillman was born in 1952 and grew up on a ranch in Athena, Oregon. Tillman attended Willamette University, and then the University of Oregon where he majored in literature and philosophy, graduating with a bachelor's degree in 1974. After graduation, he worked for a summer at the Oakland Zoo in Oakland, California, where he got a close-up introduction to exotic animals. When he finished his summer job, Tillman returned to his family ranch, joined the American Association of Zoological Parks and Aquariums, and bought his first llamas. He called his business Andes Llamas.

== Llama breeder ==
Tillman began raising llamas at his ranch near Athena in 1975. In 1978 he began publishing The Llama Newsletter, the nation's first llama publication. In addition to providing general information on llama ownership, breeding, and health, the newsletter became a forum for sharing scientific research such as the study of camelid blood chemistry used to determine pregnancy, llama taxonomy and evolution, and the bonding effects of bottle feeding young animals. Tillman personally contributed to a number of the studies. As a result, the Agency for International Development invited Tillman to study llamas and alpacas in Peru. In 1980, Tillman completed the project. Based on his comprehensive study of several thousands Peruvian animals, he became known internationally as an expert on llama and alpaca husbandry. In 1981, Tillman used his experience as the basis for his book Speechless Brothers. While the subject of llama ranching was new in North America, the book sold 14,000 copies.

Tillman was a co-founder of the International Llama Association, and was the first president of the association. In 1986 he wrote the halter-class guidelines used by the American Llama Show Association to judge show animals. In 1988, he identified and described 130 physical characteristics of llama, alpaca, guanaco and vicuña. His scientific description of llamas and related species is still the most complete reference available.

In 1988, Tillman married Dr. Cheryl Lee Blake. Shortly after their marriage, they moved to Bend, Oregon to accommodate Dr. Tillman's veterinary practice. After settling there, Tillman changed the name of his business to Tillman Llamas and Suri Alpacas to reflect a second business area he was developing.

== Businessman ==
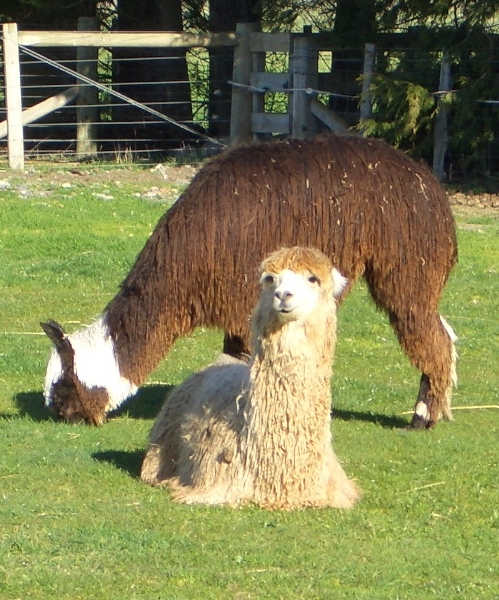
Tillman was first to import Bolivian suri alpacas

In 1993, Tillman expanded his business into South America, becoming the exclusive agent for Bolivian suri alpacas exports to the United States the following year. Tillman's South American heards eventually totaled several thousand llamas and alpacas. In 1995, his animals won first, second, and third place in the suri alpaca category at the National Expo-Feria in La Paz, Bolivia. He also won first place in the black huacaya alpaca competition, second place in the white fleece alpaca category, and third place for brown huacaya alpacas. This was the first time a North American breeder had ever won a major South American national show.

In 1996, Tillman imported the first huacaya alpacas into the United States along with the largest herd of colored suri alpacas ever brought into the country, a total of 182 animals. Because the animals came from Bolivia, the United States Department of Agriculture required the herd to be quarantined for three months at the Harry S. Truman Animal Import Center in Key West, Florida. Nevertheless, it was a profitable venture for Tillman. The next year, he exported one hundred llamas and alpacas from his ranch in Bend to Canadian buyers.

In 2007, Tillman sold his show champion llamas and alpacas and most of his breeding stock at an international auction held at the Indiana State Fair ground in Indianapolis, Indiana. Still interested in science, in 2006, Tillman sponsored a study of llama and alpaca fiber at Washington State University in Pullman, Washington. The study used a scanning electron microscope to identify and analyze the unique surface structure of llama and suri alpaca fibers.

Today, Tillman is retired, retaining about forty animals on his ranch. He still writes about llama and alpaca husbandry, and is an editor for Purely Suri magazine.

== Military arms expert ==
Over the years, Tillman has been a frequent contributor to Jane's International Defence Review, an industry trade journal that reports on military news and related technologies. His first article, a test report of the AK-74 assault rifle, appeared in the October 1983 edition of the magazine. He became a contributing editor for small arms in 1992. Over a period of thirteen years, he produced over fifty test reports on various weapon systems. Tillman applied Jeff Cooper’s concept of speed, power, and accuracy to the evaluation of military firearms. His tests recorded the time it took to engage a target from different shooting positions and measured the dispersion of different burst lengths in full-automatic mode.

As part of various test protocols, Tillman live-fired machine guns, grenade launchers, automatic cannons, rocket launchers, and anti-tank guided missile systems. In some cases, his reports were used as the basis for weapons acquisition decisions. For example, his test report on the M249 light machine gun was used by the United States Army and United States Marine Corps as part of their evaluation prior to acquiring that system. Based on Tillman's testing, acquisition of the M249 was postponed until design deficiencies he helped identify were corrected. In addition, his test report of the Mk 19 grenade launcher was the basis for the Army's decision to purchase that weapon.

In 1996, he left his editor position with Jane’s when his test work began to interfere with his llamas and alpaca business.
