= Alphonso Jackson =

American politician (born 1945)

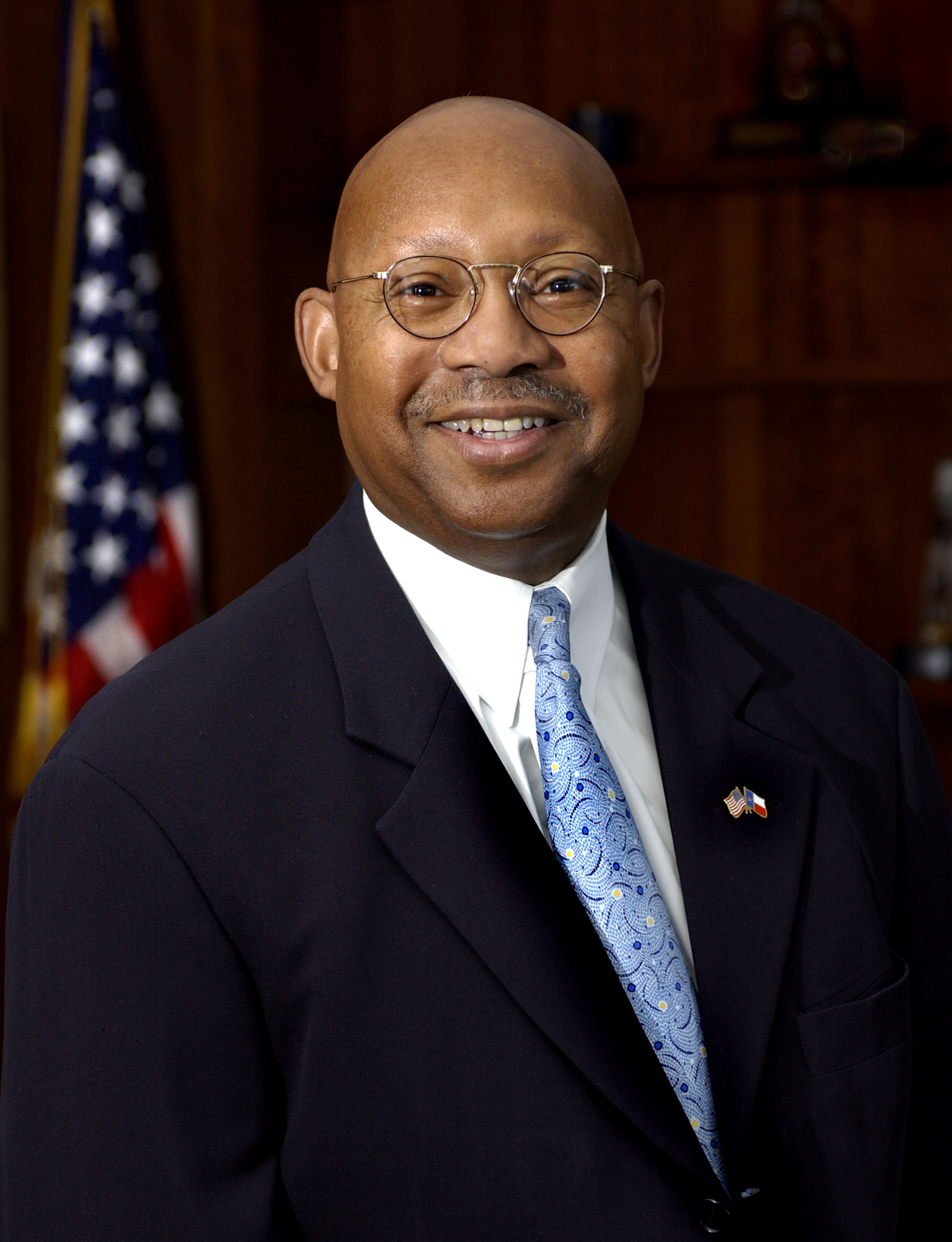
- Official portrait, 2005

13th United States Secretary of Housing and Urban Development
- In office August 31, 2004 – April 18, 2008
- President: George W. Bush
- Deputy: Roy Bernardi
- Preceded by: Mel Martínez
- Succeeded by: Steve Preston

5th United States Deputy Secretary of Housing and Urban Development
- In office May 24, 2001 – August 31, 2004
- President: George W. Bush
- Preceded by: Saul N. Ramirez Jr.
- Succeeded by: Roy Bernardi

Personal details
- Born: September 9, 1945 (age 81) Marshall, Texas, U.S.
- Party: Republican
- Spouse: Marcia
- Children: 2
- Education: Truman State University (BA, MEd); Washington University (JD)

Alphonso R. Jackson (born September 9, 1945) is an American politician who served as the 13th United States secretary of housing and urban development (HUD) from 2004 to 2008. He was nominated by President George W. Bush on August 28, 2004, and confirmed by the Senate on August 31, 2004. Jackson announced his resignation on March 31, 2008.

== Early life and career ==
Jackson was born on September 9, 1945, in Marshall, Texas, and grew up in South Dallas as the youngest of 12 children in the family. His mother was a midwife, while his father sometimes worked as many as three jobs—as a foundry worker, janitor, and landscaper—to make ends meet.

=== Education ===
Jackson attended Truman State University, where he studied political science. He went on to earn a master's degree in education administration from the school in 1969. But instead of taking a teaching job, Jackson enrolled in the Washington University School of Law in St. Louis.

In March 1965, Jackson, then a college freshman, participated in the first of the civil rights Selma to Montgomery marches, which became known as "Bloody Sunday".

=== Early career ===
Jackson began his professional career in St. Louis as an assistant professor at the University of Missouri – St. Louis. In 1977, he was named the city's director of public safety. He became executive director of the St. Louis Housing Authority four years later, a job he held until 1983. He left it to work as a consultant to a St. Louis accounting firm and intensified his political activities. Active in both Democratic and Republican circles in the city for many years, he even ran for a spot as St. Louis's municipal revenue collector. He also worked for the U.S. Senate campaign of Jack Danforth, a Republican. His rising profile earned him the attention of officials in Washington, and in 1987, he was made the director of the U.S. Department of Public and Assisted Housing for Washington, D.C.

=== Dallas Housing Authority ===
In 1989, Jackson was tapped to take over the Housing Authority of the City of Dallas as its president and chief executive officer. He was the first African American to lead the formerly troubled agency, which had become the target of discrimination lawsuits. In his seven years on the job, Jackson was credited with fixing the problems within the Dallas Housing Authority (DHA) and improving conditions for the city's poorest residents, who turned to it for help in a time of need. He worked to improve the run-down buildings and unsafe conditions that had become standard in the city's aging public-housing units and also arranged deals that improved neighborhood conditions. He managed to find funds for a commercial development project, for example, that brought the first supermarket back to a struggling West Dallas neighborhood in several years.

Jackson's seven-year stint in Dallas was not without its challenges. In 1995 the DHA began implementing a U.S. District Court order that came about after a mid-1980s challenge to desegregate the city's public-housing units. The court order called for 3,200 low-income families to be placed in neighborhoods that were predominantly white, and the agency drew up a plan for new units to be built in a section of North Dallas that was predominantly white. The townhouses or duplexes would house just 75 families, but some 2,000 local homeowners organized to fight it.

=== Private sector ===
In the end, Jackson left the public sector when Central Southwest Power, now American Electric Power offered him the vice president of corporate resources for CSW Energy and International in Dallas, Texas in 1996. In 1998, he became president and COO of American Electric Power-Texas, an Austin-based subsidiary of American Electric Power, a $13 billion utility company. Jackson was responsible for the company's operations in South and West Texas.

=== Return to public sector ===
With a new Republican administration in the White House, Jackson was a likely contender for a federal appointment, especially since he had known George W. Bush, the former Texas governor, since 1989, when both lived in the same Dallas neighborhood. In early 2001, Jackson's name was approved by Congress to serve as the deputy secretary of the Department of Housing and Urban Development (HUD), a post that essentially made him second-in-command and chief operating officer of the cabinet department, working under HUD Secretary Mel Martínez.

Jackson succeeded Martínez as Secretary in August 2004, and served until resigning in March 2008.

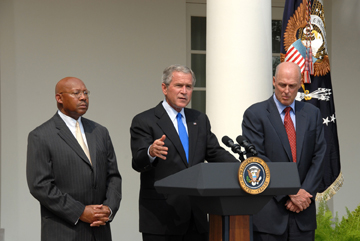
Press conference at the White House discussing financial crisis, left to right, U.S. Secretary of Housing and Urban Development Alphonso Jackson, President George W. Bush and U.S. Treasury Secretary Hank Paulson.

After Jackson's public service in Washington, DC, as Secretary of Housing and Urban Development, he was the distinguished university professor and director of the Center for Public Policy and Leadership at Hampton University, Hampton, Virginia, from 2008 to 2012. Hampton University's Center for Public Policy focuses on making its university research relevant to real-world problems. No other Historically Black University houses such a center.

=== Current career ===
In 2012, Jackson became vice-chairman of consumer & community banking with JPMorgan Chase in New York City.

== Affiliations ==
An expert on public housing and urban issues, Jackson has been asked to serve on a number of national and state commissions, most notably the General Services Commission of the State of Texas, where he served as chairman; the National Commission on America's Urban Families, and the National Commission on Severely Distressed Public Housing. He has served on the U.S. Chamber of Commerce, The Nature Conservancy of Texas, Vice Chairman of United Way Campaign(Dallas, Texas), Zale-Lipshy University Hospital, The Cotton Bowl Football Classic, Central Power & Light Company, West Texas Utilities and JPMorgan Chase (formerly Texas Commerce Bank).

Jackson currently serves on the United States Department of State Fulbright Foreign Scholarship Board, Howard University's Board of Trustees and the Ford's Theatre Society Board of Trustees. Also, he is a member and serves on the board of directors, The Horatio Alger Association of Distinguished Americans, Incorporated, and is a member of the United States Institute of Peace International Advisory Council.

== Awards and honors ==
The Aspen Institute – Aspen Fellow; The National Boys and Girls Clubs of America – Chairman's Award; The National Academy of Achievement – Golden Plate Award; American Family Life Assurance Company (AFLAC) – Lifetime Achievement Award; The Jewish National Fund, New York – National Tree of Life Award; Truman State University – Distinguished Alumni Award; Washington University in St. Louis – Distinguished Alumni Award.

In December 2017, Jackson was chosen to receive the Horatio Alger Award for 2018. The Horatio Alger Association of Distinguished Americans recognizes people who have overcome personal challenges to achieve personal and professional success.

== Honorary degrees ==
Benedict College, Hampton University, Harris-Stowe State University; Hiram College; Morehouse College; North Carolina A&T State University; Paine College; Tuskegee University; Texas College; Texas Southern University

== Secretary of Housing and Urban Development ==
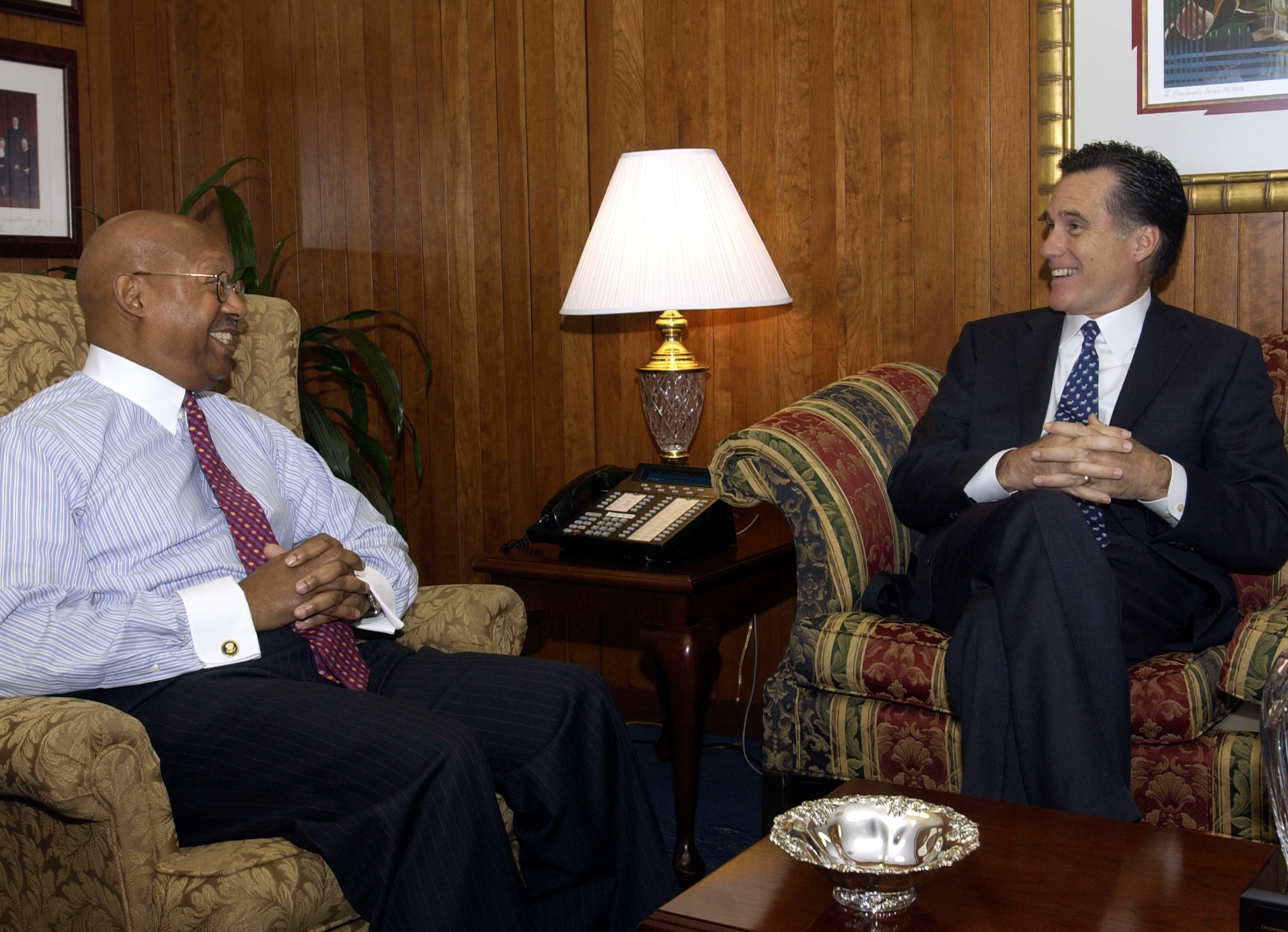
Secretary Jackson with Massachusetts Governor Mitt Romney

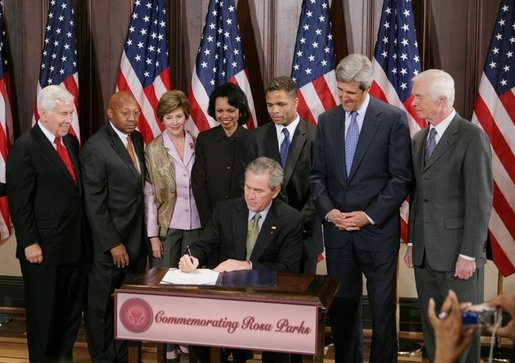
White House signing of Bill for Rosa Parks statue. The President is joined by, from left to right, Senator Richard G. Lugar, Secretary of Housing and Urban Development Alphonso Jackson, Mrs. Laura Bush, Secretary of State Condoleezza Rice, Rep. Jesse Jackson Jr. Senator John Kerry and Senator Thad Cochran

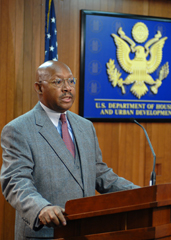
Secretary Jackson Announces Homeless Assessment to Congress

Jackson first joined the Bush administration in June 2001 as the deputy secretary and chief operating officer of the U.S. Department of Housing and Urban Development. As deputy secretary, Jackson managed the day-to-day operations of HUD, which had an annual budget of over $30 billion. After HUD Secretary Mel Martínez left the administration to campaign for the November 2004 election for a U.S. Senate seat in Florida, Jackson became acting secretary of HUD. He was nominated by President George W. Bush on August 28, 2004, to take that position on a permanent basis, and was unanimously confirmed by the Senate on August 31, 2004. Jackson was the fourth African American to hold that post. On March 31, 2008, Jackson announced his resignation, effective April 18 of that year.

=== HUD Removal from High Risk List ===
For the first time in 13 years, the US Government Accountability Office (GAO) removed HUD from the government's " high-risk" list. GAO's report recognized HUD's progress under Secretary Jackson's leadership in implementing management controls that led to significant improvements to HUD departments and programs.

Jackson stated, " HUD serves the nation best when all its programs are working effectively and efficiently. GAO's removal of a high risk designation shines a bright light on our efforts over the past six years to ensure taxpayer dollars are spent wisely and well."

=== Reduction in homelessness ===
During Jackson's tenure at HUD, HUD announced an 11.5% reduction in the number of persons reported as chronically homeless by Continuums of Care (CoCs) during a one-day count. Over 1,500 cities and counties reported a combined decrease of over 20,000 fewer chronically homeless persons between 2005 and 2006.

One important tool in this effort was HUD's first-ever Annual Homeless Assessment Report to Congress. This groundbreaking survey of homelessness found that 704,000 people nationwide sought shelter at least once in a three-month period. Through the data collection for the report, and the subsequent analysis of that data, HUD learned a great deal about the demographics of homelessness. Prior to the report, according to Jackson, HUD had a hard time figuring out if national or local programs were working and a tough time just trying to figure out where the homeless might be on a given night.

=== Increase in minority contracting ===
Jackson increased minority, women, and small business contracting substantially during his tenure. In 2003, the year before Jackson was named secretary, 14 percent—or $134 million—of the Department of Housing and Urban Development's contracts went to black-owned firms, officials say. By 2007, black-owned businesses were receiving 25 percent of the department's contracts, or $195.6 million. Jackson promoted such statistics, saying that "a good bottom line with small and minority businesses helps to build a stronger America."

This accomplishment led to a federal investigation and caused some to think Jackson was wrongly targeted because of his efforts. Indeed, some of his supporters deride the scrutiny of his casual friendships as a racist effort to undermine a prominent black official and several respected black businessmen, noting that no one has been charged with a crime.

Representative James E. Clyburn of South Carolina, the No. 3 Democrat in the House, said he believed the investigation was fueled by officials determined to derail Jackson's efforts to expand affirmative action. "Is there something wrong with trying to make sure African-Americans participate in the contracting program with the American government?" asked Mr. Clyburn.

On April 30, 2010, the Justice Department announced it would not be pursuing charges against Jackson. Jackson's lawyers noted that a lawyer at the Justice Department's public integrity unit told them that it was closing its investigation. One lawyer for Jackson stated that the Justice Department had been unable to find evidence that Jackson received any benefit in exchange for his office's recommendations and that "when that quid pro quo is missing, it takes away any motivation for improper steering."

=== Local housing authorities ===
==== Philadelphia ====
In March 2008, The Washington Post reported on a series of emails in early 2007 between HUD assistant secretaries Kim Kendrick and Orlando J. Cabrera that suggested that HUD leadership sought to punish Carl R. Greene, the director of the Philadelphia Housing Authority (PHA). On the date these e-mails were sent, HUD notified the housing authority that it had been found in violation of rules requiring that 5 percent of housing be accessible to disabled residents. The department later argued that because the authority refused to acknowledge it was in violation and to agree to a specific remedy, it was in violation of a broader agreement that put $50 million in federal funding in jeopardy. Greene, who later was forced to resign from the Philadelphia Housing Authority due to numerous accusations of wrongdoings, asserted that the HUD actions were in retaliation against PHA because Greene had refused to turn over property to Universal Community Homes, a development company founded by Kenny Gamble; Greene said that Universal had not performed as promised. Gamble complained to Jackson about the situation in 2006.

A federal judge later ruled for HUD that Jackson did not treat Philadelphia differently than other local housing agencies. On October 16, 2008, the Philadelphia Housing Authority signed a ten-year agreement with HUD. PHA said that over the next four years, it would make sure 760 units of housing were upgraded to be fully accessible for people with disabilities.

==== Government contracts ====
On April 28, 2006, Jackson spoke at a meeting in Dallas and addressed the subject of government contracting. He recounted that a prospective HUD contractor had made a "heck of a proposal" and was selected upon the basis of that proposal, but upon thanking Jackson for being selected the bidder, mentioned that he did not like President Bush. As a result, Jackson said, the bidder who had criticized Bush did not receive the contract: "Brother, you have a disconnect—the President is elected, I was selected. You wouldn't be getting the contract unless I was sitting here. If you have a problem with the President, don't tell the secretary." Jackson told the crowd, "He didn't get the contract. Why should I reward someone who doesn't like the president, so they can use funds to try to campaign against the President? Logic says they don't get the contract. That's the way I believe."

After Jackson's comment, Sen. Frank Lautenberg (D-NJ) called for an investigation and Jackson to resign. The investigation found "no evidence that a contract was canceled, rescinded, terminated or not issued."

=== Countrywide Financial loan ===
In June 2008, Conde Nast Portfolio reported that Jackson, along with several other politicians and government officials, including former Cabinet Secretarys, Donna Shalala and Henry Cisneros, Senators Chris Dodd and Kent Conrad, United Nations Ambassador Richard Holbrooke had all received below-rate loans from Countrywide Financial as part of the company's "V.I.P." program. One loan was issued to refinance Jackson's townhouse in Virginia, while another was for the purchase of a vacation home on a South Carolina golf course. Jackson denied knowledge of any discounts on the loans.

According to the financial writer, David Fiderer, the source for the "Portfolio" magazine article, a former Countrywide employee, offered no written backup and made up some facts to bolster the story. Portfolio, desperate to uncover a "scandal", took his word for it. In fact, there was written documentation disproving the assertions. But since the employee did not reveal that information, Portfolio was able to maintain plausible deniability. Nothing in the paperwork suggested that anyone was paying a below-market interest rate on his loan. "The Countrywide Lineup."

The US Senate Select Committee on Ethics found in 2009 that there was "evidence on the record that the discounts offered to V.I.P.s and F.O.A.s were not the best deals that were available at Countrywide or in the marketplace at large." The committee further noted, "participation in the V.I.P. or F.O.A. programs did not necessarily mean that borrowers received the best financial deal available either from Countrywide or other lenders." The report concluded, however, that the V.I.P. program did seem to have an appearance that the program offered discounts to participants.

== Media appearances ==
- Jackson and NYCHA Chairman Tino Hernandez appeared at the Clinton Foundation Initiative for 'Green' Public Housing to work with the Clinton Foundation and the City of New York to make public housing energy-efficient.
- Stuart Varney interviewed Jackson on Fox News' Your World with Neil Cavuto to discuss the RESPA(Real Estate Settlement Procedures Act)
- He appeared on CNBC's Kudlow and Company to discuss FHA loans.
- Jackson served as a panelist to discuss "Workforce Housing in the New Economy" at University of Miami on October 4, 2012
- Speaker at the HOPE Global Financial Dignity Summit in Atlanta, GA, November 13–14, 2013

== See also ==
- List of African-American United States Cabinet members

Political offices
Preceded by Mel Martínez	United States Secretary of Housing and Urban Development; 2004–2008	Succeeded by Steve Preston
U.S. order of precedence (ceremonial)
Preceded by John W. Snow as Former U.S. Cabinet Member	Order of precedence of the United States as Former U.S. Cabinet Member	Succeeded by Margaret Spellings as Former U.S. Cabinet Member
