= John H. Mulroy =

American politician

1st Executive of Onondaga County, New York
- In office January 1, 1962 – December 31, 1987
- Preceded by: (office created)
- Succeeded by: Nicholas J. Pirro

Personal details
- Born: February 10, 1925 Syracuse, NY
- Died: September 6, 1999 (aged 74) Kingston, Ontario
- Party: Republican
- Spouse: Virginia Mulroy
- Education: Syracuse University

John Howard Mulroy (February 10, 1925 – September 6, 1999) was an American politician most notable for having served as the first county executive of Onondaga County, New York.

Mulroy was born to Morris, a dairy farmer, and Elizabeth, a former schoolteacher. His father served as the Marcellus supervisor on the Onondaga County Board of Supervisors from 1937 to 1953, when the senior Mulroy died in office.

Mulroy served as a bomber pilot in the United States Air Force for three years during World War II, and was married September 15, 1945 to the former Virginia Spaulding. He graduated with a degree in history from the University College of Syracuse University and initially earned a living by delivering milk from his family's dairy.

He began his political career by getting elected to his father's old position on the County Board of Supervisors, starting in 1957 and rising to chairman of the board in 1961. In the 1961 election, Onondaga County voters approved the adoption of a new county charter which provided for the creation of the office of county executive. The board of supervisors appointed then-chairman Mulroy as the first county executive to serve a one-year term before the office was to become elective. In 1962, the electorate voted Mulroy into his first elected term in office, which lasted five years.

His achievements in office include:

- Building the $26 million Onondaga County Civic Center
- A $12.8 million renovation of the Burnet Park Zoo
- Construction of the Onondaga County Correctional Facility
- Creation of the Beaver Lake Nature Center
- Undertaking of the $45 million Lake Ontario Water Project
- Building the 526-bed Van Duyn Home and Hospital
- Building the $127 million metropolitan sewage treatment plant
- Building Onondaga Community College
- Creating a county-wide health department
- Modernizing MacArthur Stadium
- Developing Oneida Shores Park

Mulroy was investigated several times for corruption between 1977 and 1982. He was ultimately convicted of misdemeanors and fined.

Mulroy announced his intention to retire in 1987. In his retirement, he served on the boards of several not-for-profit organizations, notably the Onondaga Historical Association, to which he donated a quarter of a million dollars.

Mulroy was stricken while on a Syracuse Newspapers-sponsored fishing trip in the Thousand Islands and was taken to Kingston General Hospital. He died after two days. He is buried in St. Francis Xavier Cemetery in the Town of Marcellus.

The Onondaga County Civic Center is named in his honor.

His son, former judge J. Kevin Mulroy, was removed from the bench in August 2000 for judicial misconduct. He died from a mysterious, rapidly progressing illness in 2005 and is buried alongside his parents. One of his daughters, Martha E. Mulroy, currently serves as a Family Court Judge.

Political offices
Preceded by	Onondaga County, New York Supervisor from Marcellus; January 1, 1957 – December 31, 1961	Succeeded by
Preceded by (Office created)	Onondaga County, New York Executive; January 1, 1962 – December 31, 1987	Succeeded by Nicholas J. Pirro
