= Hector Barreto =

Hector Barreto could refer to:

- Hector Barreto Sr. (1935–2004), Mexican-American businessman
- Hector Barreto Jr. (born 1961), former administrator of the U.S. Small Business Administration
