= Debra Ringold =

Debra Jones Ringold
- Born: September 8, 1954 (age 71); Houston, Texas
- Education: Bachelor of Arts from Texas Tech University (1977), Master of Business Administration from Southern Illinois University (1979), Doctor of Philosophy from University of Maryland, College Park (1986)

Debra Jones Ringold (born September 8, 1954) is a professor and former dean at the Atkinson Graduate School of Management at Willamette University and is a marketing research consultant. She was selected to advise the U.S. Census Bureau on methods for improving Census participation, data collection methodology and communication of Census data to the public.

Ringold is the JELD-WEN Professor of Free Enterprise Emeritus and Dean Emeritus at Willamette University, where she taught classes in private, public and nonprofit sector marketing; marketing research; marketing communications; and marketing and public policy. She has served on the editorial board of the Journal of Public Policy since 1991, including a three-year term as its associate editor. She also serves on the editorial boards for the Journal of Advertising and the Journal of Consumer Affairs. In 2000, she was elected to the American Marketing Association board of directors, completing a term as chairperson in 2007. She also served on the executive council for the National Association of Schools of Public Affairs and Administration from 2010 to 2013.

== Education ==
Ringold earned her B.A. in zoology from Texas Tech University in 1977. She went on to attend Southern Illinois University, where she worked as a fine arts programmer and student affairs administrator both during and after earning her M.B.A. in 1979. While teaching and producing a wide range of events – including dance, theater, film and contemporary art exhibits – she became increasingly intrigued by the marketing aspects of her job. In 1982, she enrolled at the University of Maryland, where she developed an interest in investigating the intersection of marketing and public policy. She earned her Ph.D. in 1986.

== Research and consulting ==
Ringold's research focuses on how regulation of commercial activity affects consumer behavior. Her work has been published in the Journal of Marketing, Journal of Public Policy and Marketing, Journal of Advertising, Journal of Macromarketing, International Journal of Advertising, Journal of Marketing Management, Journal of Consumer Policy, Journal of Consumer Affairs, Psychology and Marketing, American Behavioral Scientist, and the Journal of the Association of Consumer Research. In 2008, her expertise in public policy and consumer behavior led to her appointment to the U.S. Census Bureau Advisory Council. She has also worked with the Federal Trade Commission and the U.S. Food and Drug Administration to evaluate how regulations impact consumers.

Ringold offers marketing consulting services to consumer package goods firms and large nonprofit organizations, including the Anheuser-Busch Companies, Canadian Broadcasting Corporation, State Farm Insurance, SAIF corporation, and Hewlett-Packard, among others.

== Politics and community ==
Ringold ran for Oregon State Representative, 35th District, on the Republican ticket in 2000. Her campaign centered on a commitment to strengthening education funding in both K-12 and higher education; improving quality of life for Oregonians; and promoting equal opportunity by supporting pay equity, job creation affordable housing and improved access to affordable health care. Before running for office, she had served on the Corvallis School Board Budget Committee and Task Forces as well as the Wilson Elementary School Site Council.

Throughout her career, Ringold has remained active in the community. In addition to serving as a board member for Oregon Women MBAs and past board member for Greenlight Greater Portland, Oregon (2008 to 2009), she has been a board member for Corvallis Caring Place Nonprofit Assisted Living Facility, Family Building Blocks Relief Nursery and United Way of Benton County. She also has served as a steering committee member for Corvallis Kids Count and PTA President for Wilson Elementary School.

== Awards ==
- Ringold's teaching awards include the Jerry E. Hudson Distinguished Teaching Award (1997) and the United Methodist Award for Exemplary Teaching and Community Service (2002).
- She was recognized with Janis K. Pappalardo for her outstanding research in 2004 with the Thomas C. Kinnear / Journal of Public Policy and Marketing Award.
- In 2005, Ringold was honored as the Administrator of the Year at Willamette University.
- Portland Business Journal presented Ringold with its Orchid Award, which recognizes outstanding women in the business community, in 2009 during an April 23 ceremony at the Oregon Convention Center.
- Ringold was awarded the Exemplary Teacher of the Year Award by the United Methodist Church's national leadership development center and the General Board of Higher Education and Ministry in 2021.

== Publications ==
- Ringold, D.J. (2023), “Consumer Skepticism, Advertising Regulation, and the Internet: Questions Worth Exploring,” Journal of Consumer Affairs.
- Ringold, D.J. (2022), “Enduring Consumer Beliefs about Advertising and Mass Media: Implications for Publicity and Its Impact,” International Journal of Advertising, Volume 41 (3), 563-587.
- Ringold, D.J. (2021), “Skepticism of Food Labelling Versus Food Advertising: A Replication and Extension,” Journal of Marketing Management, 37 (11-12), 1169-1190. * Hastak, M., A. Mitra, and D.J. Ringold (2020), "Do Consumers View the Nutrition Facts Panel When Making Healthfulness Assessments of Food Products? Antecedents and Consequences," Journal of Consumer Affairs, 54 (2), 395-416. Finalist for the Journal of Consumer Affairs Best Article Award.
- Mitra, A., M. Hasak, D.J. Ringold, and A.S. Levy (2019), "Consumer Skepticism of Claims in Food Ads Versus on Food Labels: An Exploration of Differences and Antecedents," Journal of Consumer Affairs, 53 (4), 1443-1455.
- Ringold, D.J. (2016), “Assumptions about Consumers, Producers, and Regulators: What They Tell Us about Ourselves,” Journal of the Association for Consumer Research, 1 (3), 341-354.
- Maltz, E., Thompson, F. and Ringold, D.J. (2011), "Assessing and maximizing corporate social initiatives: a strategic view of corporate social responsibility," Journal of Public Affairs, 11 (n/a), 384-392.
- Ringold, D.J. (2008), "Le Mieux Est L'ennemi Du Bien," Journal of Public Policy and Marketing, 27 (2), 197-201.
- Ringold, D.J. (2008) “Responsibility and Brand Advertising in the Alcohol Beverage Market: The Modeling of Normative Drinking Behavior,” Journal of Advertising, 37 (1), 127-141.
- Ringold, D.J. and B. Weitz (2007), “The American Marketing Association Definition of Marketing: Moving from Lagging to Leading Indicator,” Journal of Public Policy and Marketing, 26 (2), 251-260.
- Ringold, D.J. (2006), “The Morality of Markets, Marketing, and the Corporate Purpose,” in Does Marketing Need Reform?, Jagdish N. Sheth and Rajendra S. Sisodia, eds., Armonk, NY: M.E. Sharpe, 64-68.
- Ringold, D.J. (2005), “Vulnerability in the Marketplace: Concepts, Caveats, and Possible Solutions,” Journal of Macromarketing, 25 (2), 202-214.
