= Willamette University MBA =

MBA program at Willamette University

Atkinson Graduate School of Management, Willamette University MBA
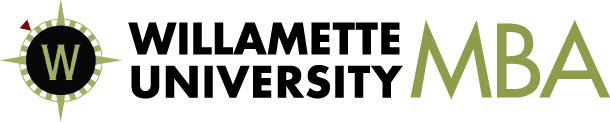
- Type: Private
- Established: 1974
- Dean: Romana Autrey
- Academic staff: 45
- Administrative staff: 20
- Students: 312
- Location: Salem and Portland, Oregon, USA; 44.936172°N 123.033957°W
- Campus: Urban
- Website: willamette.edu/academics/mba/

The Willamette University MBA (Atkinson Graduate School of Management) is the Masters in Business Administration (MBA) program at Willamette University in Salem, Oregon, United States. It is one of only two MBA programs in the world accredited for both Business Administration (AACSB International) and Public Administration (NASPAA). Atkinson was established by Willamette in 1974 and has an enrollment of approximately 312 students.

== History ==
Atkinson Graduate School was founded at Willamette University in 1974 and moved into the new Seeley G. Mudd Building in 1975. The first year had 52 students and five professors. The program is older than the management program at Yale University. Stephen Archer served as the school's first dean. The school was first named as the Willamette University School of Administration before being renamed as the George H. Atkinson Graduate School of Management. Atkinson was a businessman in the construction industry and a trustee of Willamette before he died in 1978. He served as president of the board of trustees and made the largest single donation in school history up to that time in 1969 when his foundation gave $3.4 million to the university.

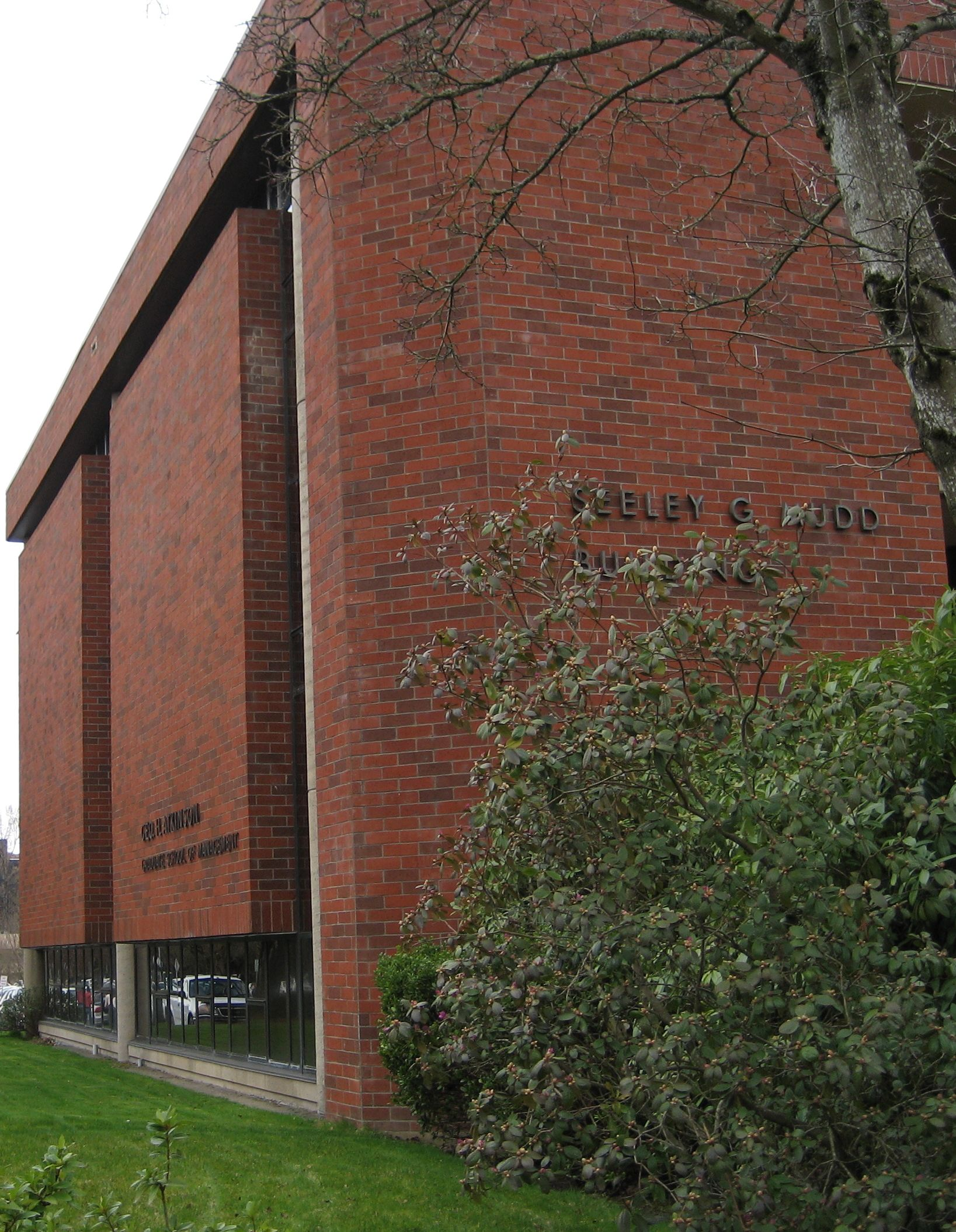
Built in 1975, the Seeley G. Mudd Building houses Atkinson Graduate School of Management

In 1978, the Center for Business-Government Studies was added to the school after Willamette received a grant from the M. J. Murdock Charitable Trust. The program was designed to better understand the relationships between the government and businesses. In 1988, the school was recognized by U.S. News & World Report and the fifth best business school in the Midwest and West region. It was the highest ranked of any school in the Pacific Northwest. Enrollment was 130 students with 10 full-time professors. At that time the program was led by Dean David L. Puryear with a tuition of just over $8,000 per year.

In 1990, the school hired G. Dale Weight to serve as dean, the same year he was removed as chief executive officer of the Benj. Franklin Savings and Loan after the thrift was seized by the government during the Savings and loan crisis. Weight remained dean until 1998. At that time Atkinson GSM had 184 students and 11 full-time faculty members. Tuition was $14,900 per year then and incoming students scored an average of 550 on the Graduate Management Admission Test. From 1998 to 2002, Atkinson was led by Dean Bryan Johnston. Johnston had been the interim president at Willamette and a member of the Oregon House of Representatives.

Atkinson opened a center to the north in Portland's Pearl District in August 2005 to provide a two-year MBA program in the Oregon's most populous city. In February 2007, the Jeld-Wen Foundation made a $2.5 million donation to endow a free-enterprise professorship at the school, the largest donation ever for the graduate program. Dean Jim Goodrich, who joined Atkinson in 2003, retired from the school in June 2007, with Debra J. Ringold serving as interim dean. Previously the JELD-WEN Professor in Free Enterprise, Ringold was named as the permanent dean in January 2008. In 2007, the Center for Business Education ranked the school 58th in their Beyond Grey Pinstripes rankings for emphasizing social and environmental awareness in the business world. The school was admitted to the Graduate Management Admission Council in June 2009. As of 2009, the program had approximately 230 students, and was the largest full-time MBA program in Oregon. The program enrollment grew to 312 students as of 2011.

The Atkinson Graduate School of Management was ranked among Forbes magazine's "Best Business Schools" list in 2009 and 2011. It is the only ranked program on Forbes' 2011 list in Oregon. The MBA program was ranked as the third largest in the Portland area by the Portland Business Journal in 2012. The school's Portland center moved to Northwest 12th Avenue and Kearney to the RiverTec building in 2013. In June 2015, the school received a $1 million gift from alumnus George Hoyt and his wife Colleen.

In 2024, Willamette's Portland Center relocated to the EcoTrust building in the Pearl District. In 2025, the MBA program in Salem moved from the Mudd building to Kaneko.

== Academics ==
Atkinson offers several different graduate programs. The school offers full-time, part-time, and evening enrollment. MBA programs include the MBA for Professionals, One Year MBA, and Early Career and Career Change MBA. In the Early Career and Career Change MBA, students can choose areas of interests including entrepreneurship, finance and accounting, global management, human resources and organizational management, management science and quantitative methods, marketing, and public and non-profit management. Students in their first year in a program are required to enroll in an entrepreneurship course called PACE that includes strategies that are used to develop a business plan. The graduate programs also require courses in business ethics, including the Oregon Ethics in Business Awards evaluation program. Located across the street from the Oregon State Capitol, unlike similar management schools, Atkinson has been able to maintain some of its focus on public management programs.

The school also offers a four-year joint MBA-JD degree in association with the Willamette University School of Law. Willamette's MBA for Professionals program is available on the Portland and Salem campus, but also meets online with a hybrid structure. This hybrid MBA focuses management skill development, broad based strategic thinking and cross-functional knowledge. Classrooms are located online, in the EcoTrust building in the Pearl District, and on the Salem campus in Kaneko.

Atkinson offers three study abroad programs, Copenhagen Business School in Denmark and Bordeaux Business School and EM Strasborg Business School in France. In addition to student programs, AGSM also offers an Executive Development Center (EDC) designed to educate businesses and organizations as consultants to those groups. The PACE Program is the centerpiece of Atkinson's full-time MBA Program, specifically for students early in their career or changing careers. By working within and outside organizations, students apply what they are learning in the classroom to the inner workings of the private, non-profit, and government sectors.

=== Rankings and accreditation ===
Business school rankings

U.S. MBA Rankings
- Bloomberg (2025): 74

AGSM is accredited by the AACSB in business, by NASPAA for government and not for profit administration, and the law school has been accredited by the American Bar Association since 1938. It was the first school in the world to be accredited by both the NASPAA and AACSB. Atkinson was selected as one of the top 91 programs for preparing MBA's for social and environmental stewardship by "Beyond Grey Pinstripes" and ranked 28th for the specialty of "Public Affairs, Public Finance and Budgeting" by U.S. News & World Report. As of 2009, U.S. News & World Report ranks the school's public affairs program as the 90th best in the United States. Willamette's MBA program is also listed as one of Forbes best business schools, the highest ranked program in Oregon in 2009 and the only ranked program in Oregon in 2011. It was also the only Oregon school to make Bloomberg Businessweek's rankings in 2014, coming in at 81.

"Beyond Grey Pinstripes" again recognized Willamette's commitment to ethics, environmental stewardship and social responsibility. Willamette's MBA was ranked No. 23 in the world in the rankings released in 2011. Willamette received special recognition for its business impact, which measures how courses prepare students to lead for-profit businesses that improve social and environmental conditions.

In 2023, Willamette MBA was ranked as a top US B-school by Bloomberg Business week for the 10th consecutive year. It was ranked #1 in Oregon. Willamette MBA was ranked a 2024 top business school (#1 in Oregon and #2 in the Pacific Northwest) by Bloomberg Businessweek. Out of over 1,100 accredited MBA programs in the US, Willamette MBA was listed in the top 100, putting it within the top 10% of all MBA programs in the country.

=== Facilities ===
The Salem school is housed in the Kaneko Building within Willamette University campus in Salem.

The MBA department used to be located within the Mudd building. The building is named after Seeley G. Mudd, a physician, educator, and philanthropist who has many buildings across the country named in his honor. The Mudd building was completed in 1975. This structure was designed by architect Phil Settecase. In 2000, the school installed a wireless network in the building. Law classes are held in the neighboring Truman Wesley Collins Legal Center. Collins was built in 1967 and expanded in 1992.

The Willamette University Portland Center was established in 2005 and houses the MBA for Professionals (hybrid evening and weekend) program. It used to be located in a 5,070-square-foot (471 m^{2}) space in the Pearl District at the RiverTec Building. It is now renamed the Willamette Graduate and Professional Center, which is located in the EcoTrust building within Portland's Pearl District. It houses courses from the MBA school as well as the School of Computing and Information Sciences. The Portland Center is also utilized for events through Willamette's Executive Development Center.

== Students ==
Atkinson has an enrollment of 312 students in all programs. Students have an average entering GPA of 3.30 and Graduate Management Admission Test (GMAT) score of 610. Select students are eligible for induction into Beta Gamma Sigma, the honor society for business students. The average age of students in the full-time (Early Career MBA and MBA for Career Change) is 25. Over 30% of students in Willamette's full-time MBA programs come from outside the U.S. The average age of students in the MBA for Professionals program is 34.

== Notable alumni ==
- Jason Atkinson, Oregon politician
- Sandy Baruah, former U.S. Commerce Department official, President of the Detroit Chamber
- Grace Crunican, general manager of BART
- David Gomberg, Oregon politician
- Punit Renjen, CEO Deloitte
