= Terdema Ussery =

American sports executive

Terdema L. Ussery II
- Born: Terdema Lamar Ussery II; December 4, 1958 (age 67); Los Angeles, California, U.S.
- Education: Princeton University (AB); Harvard University (MPA); UC Berkeley School of Law (JD); Yale University (MAR)
- Occupations: Business executive and attorney
- Years active: 1987–present
- Title: Former President & CEO of the Dallas Mavericks; Former Commissioner of the Continental Basketball Association

Terdema Lamar Ussery II (born December 4, 1958) is an American business executive and attorney who has worked in professional sports, corporate governance, and community development. He was President and Chief Executive Officer of the Dallas Mavericks in the National Basketball Association from 1997 to 2015. Before that, he was Commissioner of the Continental Basketball Association (CBA) from 1991 to 1993 and President of Nike Sports Management from 1993 to 1997. Ussery chaired the Board of Commissioners of the Dallas Housing Authority from 2008 to 2014 and has served on the boards of other organizations, universities, and companies. In 2018, journalists and independent investigators reported evidence that Ussery had sexually harassed female employees during his tenure with the Mavericks; he denied the allegations.

== Early life and education ==
Ussery was born in Los Angeles, California, and grew up in the Watts–Compton section of South Central Los Angeles. His father owned and operated a small grocery store, and in interviews Ussery has described frequent violence in the neighborhood. A school counselor helped him apply to The Thacher School in Ojai, California, including applying for financial aid, and he received a full scholarship. He has described the transition from Watts to an elite boarding school as a significant cultural adjustment.

After graduating from Thacher, Ussery enrolled at Princeton University, where he obtained a Bachelor of Arts in 1981 from the Woodrow Wilson School of Public and International Affairs. Following Princeton, Ussery pursued graduate studies at Harvard University's John F. Kennedy School of Government, earning a Master's degree in 1984. He then continued to the University of California, Berkeley School of Law (Boalt Hall), receiving his Juris Doctor in 1987 and serving as an executive editor of the California Law Review. Years later, he earned a Master of Arts in Religion from Yale University's Divinity School and subsequently joined its Board of Advisors.

== Career ==
=== Early legal work ===
After completing his Juris Doctor at Berkeley Law and clerkship at the Nevada Supreme Court, Ussery joined the Los Angeles office of Morrison & Foerster in 1987, focusing primarily on business and entertainment law. During this period, he represented financial institutions including the Bank of America and the Industrial Bank of Japan. Ussery also worked on licensing agreements and contract negotiations for production companies and artists. Ussery remained at Morrison & Foerster until 1990. His decision to leave was influenced by an invitation from then-CBA Commissioner Irv Kaze, whom he had met through the Constitutional Rights Foundation.

=== Continental Basketball Association ===
Ussery entered the professional sports industry in 1990, joining the Continental Basketball Association (CBA) as Deputy Commissioner and General Counsel. The CBA, founded in 1946 and often described as a minor league to the NBA, struggled with franchise instability, uneven revenue streams, and limited national media visibility. After about a year as Deputy Commissioner, Ussery was named Commissioner in April 1991. During Ussery's tenure as commissioner, more than half of the CBA franchises were reported to be profitable by the 1992-93 season, and league-wide attendance increased. He also introduced player-development initiatives that included education and counseling programs, college-credit opportunities for players without degrees, and expanded drug-counseling resources.

=== Nike Sports Management ===
After leaving the CBA in 1993, Ussery joined Nike Sports Management as president. He oversaw contract negotiations with athletes. Ussery remained at Nike Sports Management until 1997, when he left to become president and CEO of the Dallas Mavericks.

=== Dallas Mavericks ===
In 1997, Ussery joined the Dallas Mavericks as President and Chief Executive Officer, initially under owner Ross Perot Jr. and continuing after Mark Cuban purchased the franchise in 2000. During his first season, Ussery helped lead a campaign that secured $240 million in public funding for construction of the American Airlines Center. In 2003, he was named Corporate Executive of the Year by Black Enterprise. Townsend reported that the Mavericks sold out every home game for 11 consecutive seasons. Including playoff games, he reported a sellout streak of 620 games. In 2010, the Mavericks hosted the NBA All-Star Game at AT&T Stadium in Arlington, Texas. The game drew 108,713 spectators and set a Guinness World Records record for basketball attendance. In 2012, he was inducted into the John McLendon Minority Athletics Administrators Hall of Fame. In 2014, he was one of three finalists for the Executive Director position at the National Basketball Players Association.

=== Allegations of misconduct ===
In 1998, the Mavericks investigated allegations of improper workplace conduct involving Ussery and multiple female employees; he remained with the organization afterward. In February 2018, Sports Illustrated reported allegations from former Mavericks and American Airlines Center employees that Ussery had sexually harassed them during his tenure as president and CEO; Ussery denied the allegations and said he was not aware of any sexual-harassment complaints against him. The Mavericks hired outside counsel to conduct an independent investigation into workplace misconduct allegations. In September 2018, news reports summarizing the findings of an independent workplace investigation commissioned by the Mavericks stated that investigators found credible evidence supporting most allegations and that Ussery had engaged in improper conduct toward 15 female employees. Sports Illustrated also reported that Ussery resigned from Under Armour after about two months following an employee complaint about his conduct.

== Corporate and charitable governance ==
During his tenure as chair of the Dallas Housing Authority (DHA) from 2008 to 2014, Ussery oversaw governance and operational changes that were described as responses to earlier financial and management problems at the agency. D Magazine reported that DHA constructed more than 1,200 affordable-housing units during this period and updated its Housing Choice Voucher system, and that the U.S. Department of Housing and Urban Development recognized the agency with a "distinction" designation for four consecutive years. The same article reported that DHA allocated $12 million for on-site Head Start centers serving approximately 600 pre-kindergarten students and that Ussery established a nonprofit associated with DHA that provided college scholarships.

== Personal life ==
Ussery and his wife, Debra, have two children.
