= Punit Renjen =

Indian-American businessman (born 1961)

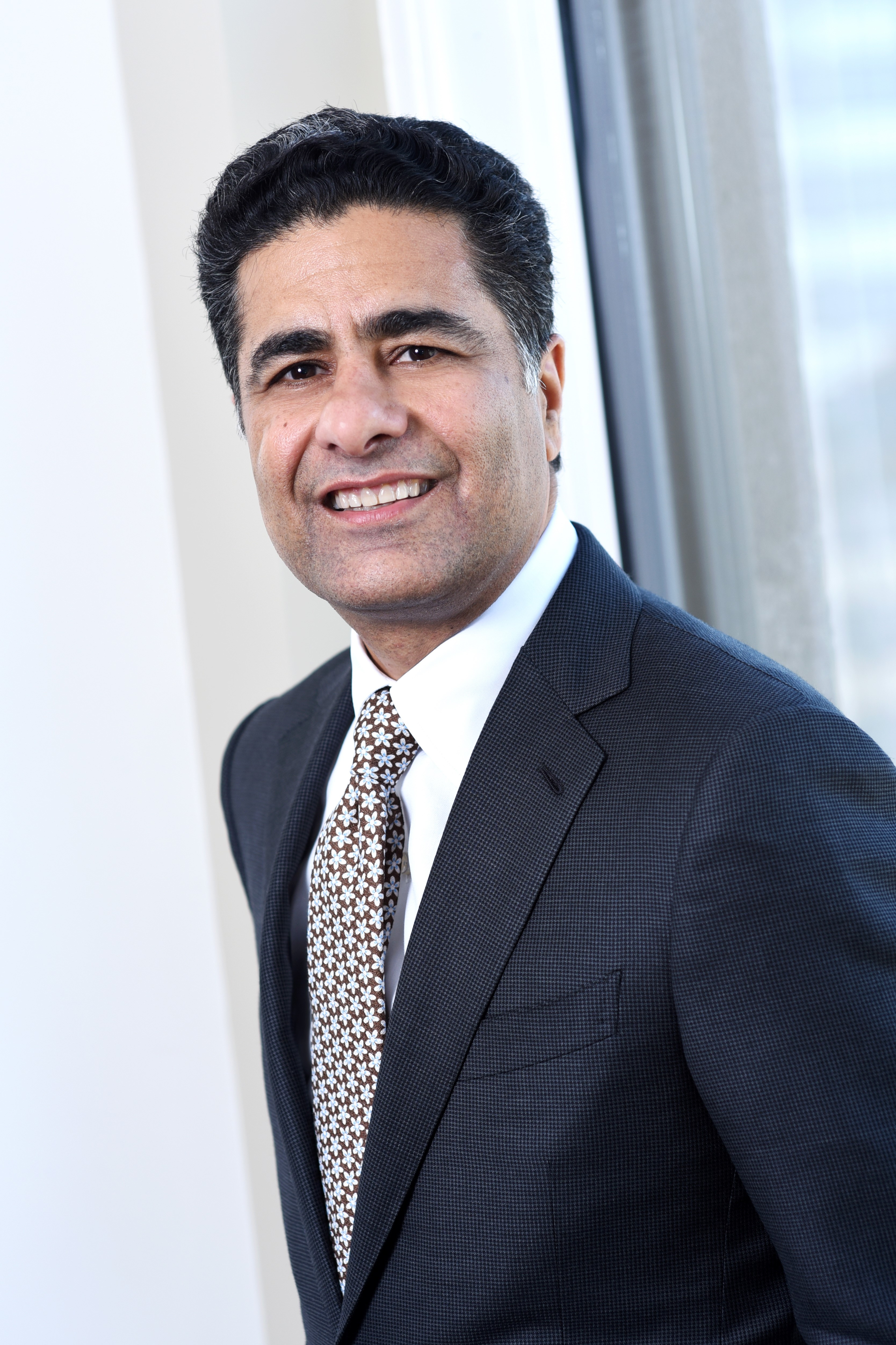
- Born: 1961 (age 64–65); Rohtak, India
- Education: Willamette University (MBA)
- Employer: Deloitte
- Title: CEO (emeritus)
- Board member of: Deloitte; United States Council for International Business; United Way Worldwide; U.S.-India Business Council; Willamette University

Punit Renjen (born 1961) is an Indian-American businessman who has been chief executive officer of the multinational professional services firm Deloitte since June 1, 2015. Previously, Renjen was chairman and CEO of Deloitte Consulting LLP, and later, held the role of chairman of Deloitte LLP (United States) from 2011 to 2015. Effective December 31, 2022, Renjen became global CEO emeritus of Deloitte.

Renjen was raised in Rohtak, North India in the state of Haryana. After earning an MBA in management from Oregon's Willamette University, he was hired by Touche Ross, which merged into Deloitte in 1989. He has worked at Deloitte and lived in the US ever since.

Renjen is on the Wall Street Journal's Council of CEOs and has been on the boards of directors at Catlin Gabel School, United Way Worldwide, the U.S.-India Business Council, and his alma mater.

Renjen was nominated to join the SAP supervisory board and succeed the SAP founder Hasso Plattner as a chairman on February 22, 2023. This nomination was rescinded when he left SAP on February 12, 2024, due to "differences in perspective on the role". He is a member of the President's Export Council.

== Early life and education ==
Renjen grew up in Rohtak, a city in Haryana's Rohtak district, in India, where his father had established an electrical switchgear factory. Around age seven, Renjen was sent to The Lawrence School, Sanawar, an autonomous public co-educational boarding school near Shimla, because his parents were seeking a better education for him than he was receiving in Rohtak. When Renjen was approximately fourteen years old, his father's business encountered financial difficulty, and the family's inability to continue paying for boarding school forced Renjen to return to Rohtak and work at the family factory part time.

Renjen attended a local college, where he earned his bachelor's degree in economics. After graduating, Renjen worked for the Delhi-based home appliance company Usha International. In 1984, he earned a Rotary Foundation Scholarship, affording him airfare to the United States and a full scholarship to Salem, Oregon's Willamette University. He earned his Master of Management from Willamette's Atkinson Graduate School of Management in 1986, and has lived in the United States ever since.

== Career ==
After graduating from Willamette, Renjen began interviewing at American firms. In the late 1980s, a partner at Touche Ross invited him to interview with the company after reading on a flight a local magazine that profiled Renjen and nine other students. He was initially hired as an associate consultant and has worked at Deloitte for 32 years since that time.

His work at Deloitte has included advising multinational companies on divestitures, mergers and acquisitions, operations, post-merger integration, and strategy. Renjen later was chairman and CEO of Deloitte Consulting LLP, which is a United States member firm, then as chairman of Deloitte LLP (United States) for four years beginning in June 2011.

Renjen is CEO of Deloitte Touche Tohmatsu Limited (Deloitte Global). The company announced Renjen's confirmation on February 16, 2015, following an election and nearly unanimous ratification by thousands of Deloitte's partners. When Renjen's four-year term as CEO began on June 1, 2015, he became the first Asia-born person to head one of the Big Four global professional services firms. In June 2019, he was elected to a second, four-year term as Deloitte Global CEO. During that time, Deloitte announced that their fiscal year numbers for 2021 reached $50.2 billion and their workforce expanded to 345,000, making them the first big 4 firm to clear $50 billion in global revenue.

In February 2018, Punit launched WorldClass, Deloitte's global initiative designed to advance education and skills for communities at risk. In 2019, the program was launched in India with the goal of supporting 10 million girls and women by 2030 there through education and skills development.

In May 2021, the Haryana government and Deloitte launched a COVID-19 project called Senjeevani Pariyojana to treat patients with mild to moderate COVID-19 symptoms in their homes. Renjen led the design of the program which is being supported by the Public Health Foundation of India and the Post Graduate Institute of Medical Science.

=== Other roles ===
In addition to Deloitte Global's boards of directors, Renjen is a member of The Wall Street Journal CEO Council, United Way Worldwide, the U.S.-India Business Council, and the Business Roundtable. He also is a member of the boards of trustees at Catlin Gabel School, United States Council for International Business and Willamette University. In 2015, the Association to Advance Collegiate Schools of Business International (AACSB) included Renjen on their inaugural "Influential Leaders" list, which recognizes "100 AACSB-member-school alumni who inspire others with their professional and volunteer work". He has co-authored articles for Chief Executive and The Journal of Business Strategy, and has been featured in interviews with Bloomberg Businessweek, Consulting, Investor's Business Daily, and The Wall Street Journal.

== Awards and honors ==
In 2007, Renjen was listed as one of Consulting magazine's "Top 25 Most Influential Consultants". In 2012, 2013, and 2014, he was named an honoree to the National Association of Corporate Directors (NACD) "Directorship 100". In 2015, the Association to Advance Collegiate Schools of Business International (AACSB) included Renjen on their inaugural "Influential Leaders" list, which recognizes "100 AACSB-member-school alumni who inspire others with their professional and volunteer work". In 2017, he was honored with the "Gaurav Samman" by the Government of Haryana. The award was given to people of Haryanvi origin residing outside of Haryana who have made significant contributions in various fields. In May 2019, he received an honorary degree from Willamette University.

Renjen received the 2020 Oregon History Makers Medal in the category of "Visionary Business Leader." Also in 2020, he was named one of the EMpower Top 100 Ethnic Minority Executive Role Models, an honor given to recognize senior executives of color who are removing barriers to success for other ethnic minority employees and are leading by example. The Indiaspora Business Leaders List recognized Renjen as one of over 50 executives from the Indian diaspora of top-tier international corporations in 2020. In 2021, the US-India Strategic Partnership Forum (USISPF) recognized Punit with the USISPF Global Achievement Award in honor of his corporate leadership in fighting COVID-19 during India's second wave. In 2022, Punit was recognized by The Economic Times as "Global Indian of the Year."

== Personal life ==
Renjen is a sports fan, with a particular affinity for cricket and American football, and a runner.

In 2022, Renjen was named by Carnegie Corporation of New York as an honoree of the Great Immigrants Award.

== See also ==
- List of people from Haryana
- List of Willamette University alumni
