= Matthew Driscoll =

American Democratic Party politician

Executive Director of the New York State Thruway Authority
- Incumbent
- Assumed office September 15, 2017 - June 25, 2019 (Acting); June 25, 2019
- Preceded by: Bill Finch (Acting)

Commissioner of the New York State Department of Transportation
- In office July 6, 2015 – September 15, 2017
- Preceded by: Joan McDonald
- Succeeded by: Paul A. Karas (Acting)

President and Chief Executive Officer of the New York State Environmental Facilities Corporation
- In office January 2010 – June 2015

52nd Mayor of Syracuse
- In office July 10, 2001 – December 31, 2009
- Preceded by: Roy Bernardi
- Succeeded by: Stephanie Miner

Personal details
- Born: February 7, 1958 (age 68) Syracuse, New York, U.S.
- Party: Democratic
- Spouse: Patti Driscoll

Matthew John Driscoll (born February 7, 1958) is an American Democratic Party politician, who served as the Commissioner of the New York State Department of Transportation from 2015 until 2017. He served as the 52nd Mayor of Syracuse, New York from July 10, 2001, until December 31, 2009. Currently he serves as the Executive Director of the New York State Thruway.

== Biography ==
Driscoll graduated in 1976 from West Genesee High School in Camillus, a suburb of Syracuse. He formerly owned "Rosie O'Grady's", a popular Irish pub in Syracuse. He became Syracuse's mayor on July 10, 2001, when former Republican Mayor Roy Bernardi was appointed as deputy secretary at the Department of Housing and Urban Development in President Bush's administration. As President of the City of Syracuse Common Council, Driscoll automatically succeeded Bernardi and served the remainder of Bernardi's mayoral term.

That fall, Driscoll defeated several other Democrats in a primary, including Kate O'Connell. He went on to be elected after defeating former common councilor Bernie Mahoney by a thirty-two percent margin. In 2005 he defeated Mahoney's daughter, Joanie Mahoney, by a 3% margin. Driscoll won in part by claiming that Mahoney's race was funded by developer Robert Congel, a Bush-Cheney fundraiser who was overseeing the proposed expansion of the Destiny USA shopping mall. Driscoll campaigned alongside Eliot Spitzer, who had already begun his campaign to win New York's governorship in 2006; Spitzer's then-widespread popularity among New York Democrats likely helped Driscoll cement support from the majority-Democrat city. He won re-election, again by a slim 3% margin (49% to 46%) Previously, he served as President of the Syracuse Common Council from 1998 to 2001, as Third District Councilor in 1995, and as Second District Councilor from 1987 to 1989.

On April 26, 2007, Driscoll announced that he would not seek the office of the Onondaga County Executive, open due to the retirement of longtime Republican incumbent Nicholas J. Pirro. Driscoll said he would serve his mayoral term out through December 2009; he also ruled out a run for Congress against James T. Walsh in 2008. Driscoll was mentioned as a possible candidate for Lieutenant Governor of New York as a possible running-mate to incumbent Governor David Paterson in 2010.

On April 8, 2015, Syracuse.com posted a news headline that he has been picked by NYS Governor Cuomo to be the next Commissioner of the New York State Department of Transportation.

== Affiliations ==
Driscoll was a member of the Mayors Against Illegal Guns Coalition, a bi-partisan group with a stated goal of "making the public safer by getting illegal guns off the streets". The Coalition was co-chaired by Mayors Thomas Menino and Michael Bloomberg.

Political offices
Preceded by Roy Bernardi	Mayor of Syracuse, NY; 2001–2009	Succeeded by Stephanie Miner
