= Joanie Mahoney =

American lawyer and politician (born 1965)

5th President of the State University of New York College of Environmental Science and Forestry
- Incumbent
- Assumed office November 4, 2020
- Preceded by: David C. Amberg (Interim)

3rd Executive of Onondaga County, New York
- In office January 1, 2008 – November 1, 2018
- Preceded by: Nicholas J. Pirro
- Succeeded by: J. Ryan McMahon

Personal details
- Born: 1965 (age 60–61) Rochester, New York, U.S.
- Party: Republican
- Spouse: Marc Overdyk
- Children: 4
- Education: Syracuse University (BA, JD)
- Profession: Attorney

Joanne M. "Joanie" Mahoney (born 1965) is the fifth president of the State University of New York College of Environmental Science and Forestry (ESF), in Syracuse, New York. Prior to this, she served as the County Executive of Onondaga County, New York. The first woman to hold, and be elected to, that position, she served from January 1, 2008, through November 1, 2018.

== Personal ==
Mahoney was raised in Syracuse, New York, as the middle child of nine children. Her father, Bernie Mahoney, was a member of the Syracuse Common Council and then the New York State Assembly.

Mahoney attended Shea Middle School and Corcoran High School in Syracuse, then received her B.A. degree from the Management School at Syracuse University in 1987, and J.D. degree from the Syracuse University College of Law in 1990.

She is married to Marc Overdyk and has four children.

== Career ==
=== Early career ===
Mahoney worked as an attorney with the Harris Beach law firm as well as a criminal prosecutor in the Onondaga County District Attorney's Office. She left the position in 1997 to become a full-time, stay-at-home mother, but decided to run for a seat on the Syracuse Common Council. She won election to the Syracuse Common Council in November 1999, and served from 2000 until 2002. Mahoney decided against running for re-election to the Common Council, choosing to spend more time with her children.

In 2005, she announced she would seek the office of Mayor of Syracuse, challenging incumbent Matthew Driscoll, a Democrat. She lost to Driscoll 49% to 46%, with Green Party candidate Howie Hawkins receiving 5% of the vote. It was the closest mayoral race in over 80 years for Syracuse.

=== County executive ===
In February 2007, long-time incumbent County Executive Nicholas J. Pirro announced his retirement. Mahoney decided to run, but failed to win the endorsement of the Onondaga County Republican Party. The Republicans endorsed Dale Sweetland, Chairman of the County Legislature. Mahoney decided to seek the Republican nomination in a party primary held on September 18, 2007. In the primary, she edged out Sweetland by 21 votes. However, Sweetland remained on the ballot, on the Conservative Party and Independence Party lines.

During the general election, Mahoney was pitted against New York State Assemblyman, William "Bill" Magnarelli. Mahoney campaigned on bringing a "fresh start" to the county, while Magnarelli campaigned on the grounds that he was more experienced than Mahoney. She also argued that Magnarelli was too tied to Albany to understand how Onondaga County worked – something the voters should not tolerate. In the course of the race, Mahoney picked up some key endorsements. She was endorsed by Syracuse Tomorrow, the political action committee of the Greater Syracuse Chamber of Commerce; The Post-Standard, the local newspaper in Syracuse; and Republican presidential-hopeful Rudy Giuliani, who is popular in upstate New York.

Mahoney won the election by a wide margin, earning 58% of the vote to Magnarelli's 36% . On November 19, 2007, Mahoney announced the names of her transition team that would ease the switch from Pirro's administration to hers. As she had promised on the campaign trail, it was a bipartisan team of Republicans and Democrats. The honorary co-chairs of her transition team were Republican County Executive Nick Pirro and former Syracuse Mayor Thomas Ganley Young, a Democrat.

Mahoney was inaugurated as Executive of Onondaga County on January 1, 2008. She was reelected in 2012, and again in 2016.

=== Presidency at SUNY-ESF ===
In September 2018, Mahoney announced her resignation as county executive, midway through her third term, to take a position as chief operating officer with the State University of New York College of Environmental Science and Forestry (ESF).

Mahoney was appointed as the fifth president of ESF on November 4, 2020. She is the college's first female president.

== Electoral history ==
Onondaga County Executive Election, 2007
| Party | Candidate | Votes | % | ±% |
|---|---|---|---|---|
| Republican | Joanie Mahoney | 68,183 | 58.1 | N/A |
| Democratic | William Magnarelli | 42,144 | 35.9 | N/A |
| Independence | Dale Sweetland | 5,862 | 5.0 | N/A |
| Working Families | William Magnarelli | | | N/A |
| Conservative | Dale Sweetland | | | N/A |
| Independent | Ed Ryan | 1,083 | 1.0 | N/A |
| Independent | Joanie Mahoney | | | N/A |
| Majority | | 26,039 | 22.2 | |
| Turnout | | 117,292 | | |

- Totals for each candidate are for all lines
- Mahoney ran as a Republican and under the Fresh Start Party line
- William Magnarelli ran as a Democrat and under the Working Families Party line
- Dale Sweetland ran under the Conservative and Independence Parties of New York
- Ed Ryan ran under the It's Your County Party line

Onondaga County Executive Republican Primary, 2007
| Party | Candidate | Votes | % | ±% |
|---|---|---|---|---|
| Republican | Joanie Mahoney | 10,412 | 49.2 | N/A |
| Republican | Dale Sweetland | 10,391 | 49.1 | N/A |
| Majority | | 21 | 0.1 | |
| Turnout | | 21,125 | | |

Syracuse, NY Mayoral Election, 2005
| Party | Candidate | Votes | % | ±% |
|---|---|---|---|---|
| Democratic | Matthew Driscoll (Incumbent) | 16,470 | 49.7 | N/A |
| Republican | Joanie Mahoney | 15,110 | 45.6 | N/A |
| Green | Howie Hawkins | 1,551 | 4.7 | N/A |
| Independence | Joanie Mahoney | | | N/A |
| Working Families | Matthew Driscoll (Incumbent) | | | N/A |
| Conservative | Joanie Mahoney | | | N/A |
| Majority | | 1,360 | 4.1 | |
| Turnout | | 33,131 | | |

- Totals for each candidate are for all lines

Academic offices
| Preceded by David C. Amberg (Interim) | President of SUNY Environmental Science & Forestry; November 4, 2020– | Incumbent |

Political offices
| Preceded by Nicholas J. Pirro | Onondaga County, New York Executive; January 1, 2008–November 1, 2018 | Succeeded by J. Ryan McMahon |
