= Aida Álvarez =

Puerto Rican politician

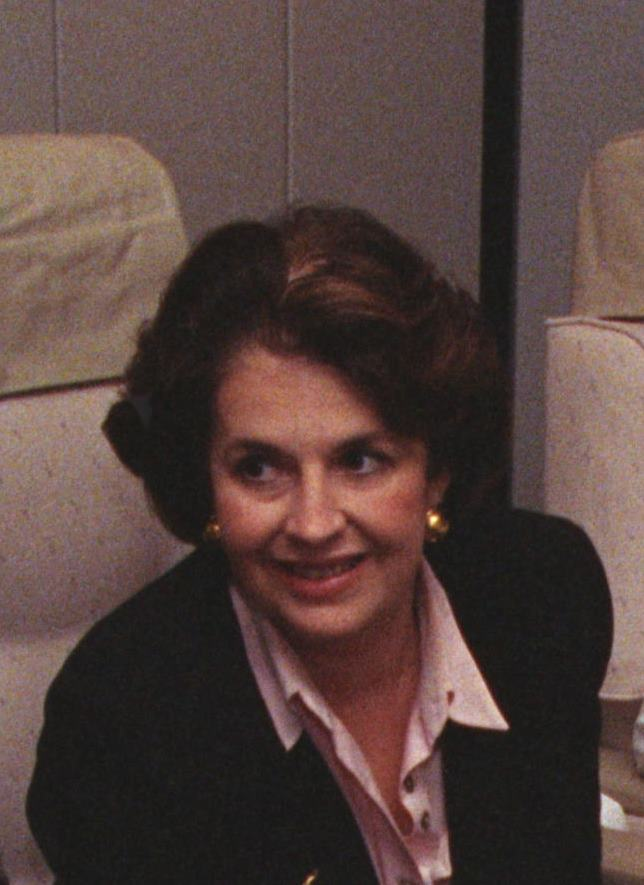

20th Administrator of the Small Business Administration
- In office March 7, 1997 – January 19, 2001
- President: Bill Clinton
- Preceded by: Philip Lader
- Succeeded by: Hector Barreto

Personal details
- Born: 1950 (age 75–76) Aguadilla, Puerto Rico
- Party: Democratic
- Education: Radcliffe College (BA)

Aída M. Álvarez (born 1950) is an American businesswoman, journalist, and politician. She previously served as the 20th administrator of the Small Business Administration under President Bill Clinton from 1997 to 2001. A member of the Democratic Party, Álvarez was the first Hispanic and Latino American woman ever to serve in a presidential cabinet.

== Early years ==
Alvarez was born in Aguadilla, Puerto Rico, into a family of modest economic means who, despite their hardships, always encouraged her to pursue her dreams. After she received her primary education in Puerto Rico, her family moved to New York City in hopes of improving their economic situation. In New York, she attended high school and participated in a program called "ASPIRA". "ASPIRA" was founded by Dr. Antonia Pantoja and has helped disadvantaged children, especially girls, gain the leadership skills and knowledge required to go to college.

Álvarez applied and was accepted at Radcliffe College of Harvard University, where in 1971 she earned her Bachelor of Arts degree, graduating cum laude. During her student years, many people provided her with support.

== Journalist for the New York Post ==
Álvarez began her career as a journalist for the New York Post and won a "Front Page Award". She later became a news reporter and news anchor for Metromedia Television (Channel Five), also in New York. In 1982, she won an Associated Press Award for Excellence, and she was nominated for an Emmy Award for her reporting of guerilla activities in El Salvador.

Álvarez ventured into the banking business by becoming an investment banker at the First Boston Corporation and at Bear Stearns. As a public servant, she spent two years at the NYC Health and Hospitals Corp. She was also a commissioner on the New York City Charter Revision Commission and a member of the Mayor's (NYC) Committee on Appointments. In June 1993, Álvarez was named Director of the Office of Federal Housing Enterprise Oversight. She created a financial safety and soundness oversight program for Fannie Mae and Freddie Mac.

== Small Business Administration ==
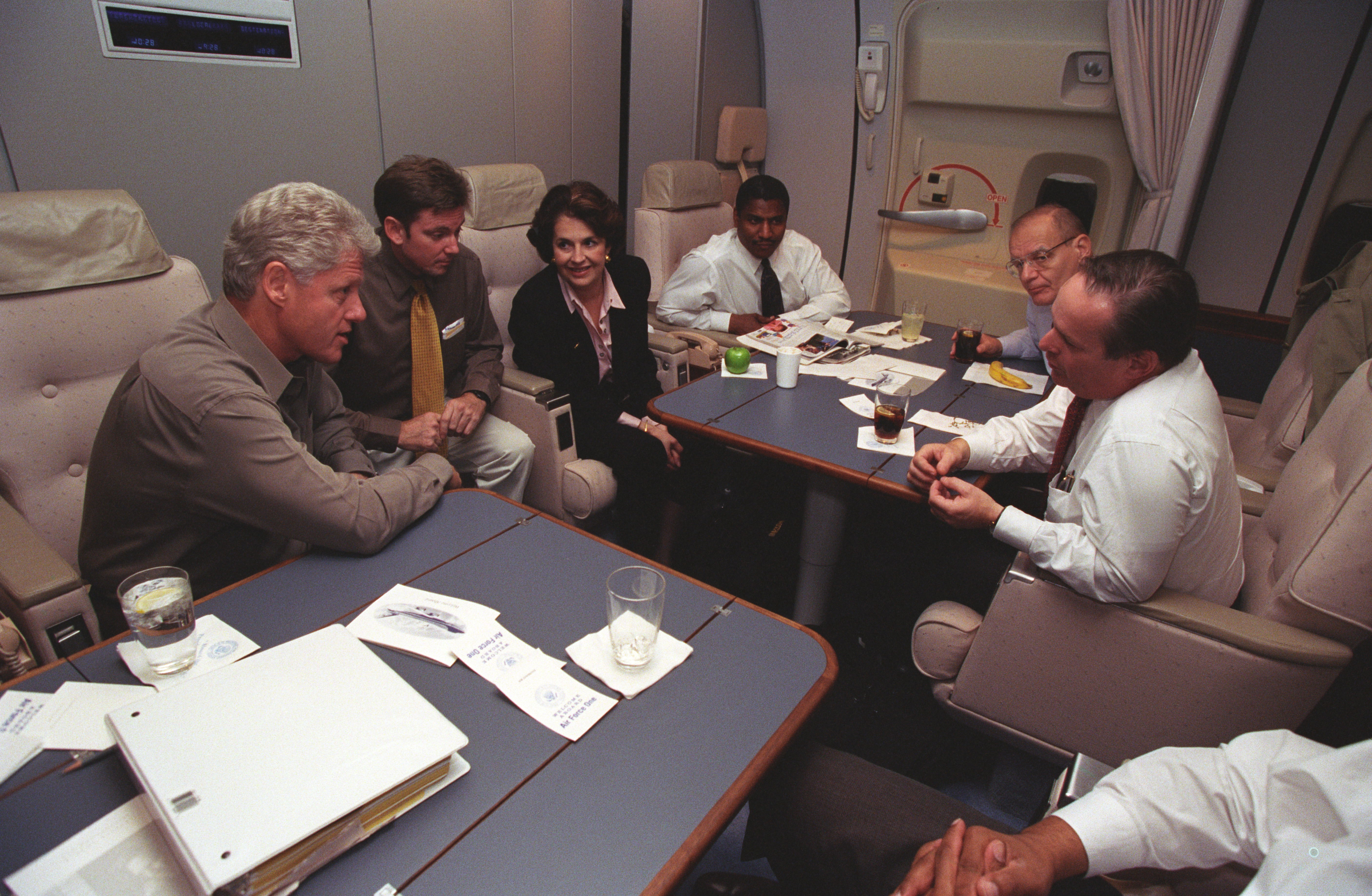
Aída Álvarez with President Clinton and Clinton administration advisers on Air Force One

In 1997, Álvarez was appointed by Bill Clinton to become the Administrator of the Small Business Administration, thus becoming the first Hispanic woman and Puerto Rican to serve as an executive officer in the U.S. Cabinet. She directed the delivery of a comprehensive set of financial and business development programs for American small businesses. The agency provided financing worth eleven billion dollars a year to small businesses across the nation.

In 2000, Álvarez was elected to the Board of Overseers of Harvard University. Her role is to visit the graduate schools, departments, and museums of the university to ensure that the university remains true to its Charter as a place of learning. She also serves on the National Trust for Historic Preservation, the Coalition for Supportive Housing, and the Board of Trustees of the Latino Community Foundation.

During the 2004 Presidential Election, Álvarez was named the official spokeswoman for Senator John Kerry. Álvarez had met Kerry during her days as the Small Business Administration administrator. She became familiar with his work in the U.S. Senate on small business development. As of January 2008, Alvarez sits on the board of directors for Wal-Mart. As of 2014, Álvarez sits on the Board of Directors of The Cisneros Center for New Americans.

Álvarez has been featured in many magazines, among them "Latina Style", and is featured in the book "Hard Won Wisdom" by Fawn Gerner, where she is quoted as saying:

"I first learned about leadership when I fought back after a female gang leader tried to bully me."

In August 2019, Álvarez was appointed to the Board of Directors of the software company Fastly. She replaced Gil Penchina as a member of the Compensation Committee of the Board and as the Chair of the Nominating and Corporate Governance Committee.

== Personal life ==
Alvarez is married to Raymond Baxter, a senior Vice President at Kaiser Permanente. They have two daughters.

== See also ==
- List of Puerto Ricans

Political offices
Preceded by Philip Lader	Administrator of the Small Business Administration; 1997–2001	Succeeded by Hector Barreto Jr.
