= Roy Bernardi =

American politician (born 1942)

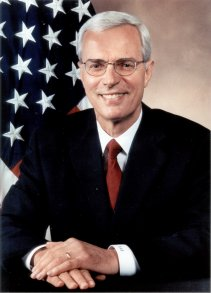

Acting United States Secretary of Housing and Urban Development
- In office April 19, 2008 – June 4, 2008
- President: George W. Bush
- Preceded by: Alphonso Jackson
- Succeeded by: Steve Preston

6th United States Deputy Secretary of Housing and Urban Development
- In office November 21, 2004 – January 20, 2009
- President: George W. Bush
- Preceded by: Alphonso Jackson
- Succeeded by: Ron Sims

51st Mayor of Syracuse
- In office January 3, 1994 – July 10, 2001
- Preceded by: Thomas Ganley Young
- Succeeded by: Matt Driscoll

Personal details
- Born: Romolo Albert Bernardi; October 14, 1942 (age 84) Syracuse, New York, U.S.
- Party: Republican
- Spouse: Alice Bernardi
- Education: Syracuse University

Romolo Albert "Roy" Bernardi (born October 14, 1942) is an American politician from Syracuse, and former United States Deputy Secretary of Housing and Urban Development (HUD). He was nominated by President George W. Bush on June 24, 2004, and confirmed by the United States Senate on November 21, 2004.

Bernardi served as Assistant Secretary for Community Planning and Development at HUD; he was appointed as acting HUD Secretary on April 19, 2008, after the resignation of Alphonso Jackson. He served until administration nominee Steve Preston was confirmed on June 4.

In 1993, Bernardi was elected as the 51st Mayor of the City of Syracuse, New York, where he served from 1994 to 2001. Bernardi had previously served as the Syracuse City Auditor for five terms. He is a graduate of Syracuse University.

In December 2020, Bernardi was nominated to serve on the Board of Governors of the United States Postal Service, but no action was taken and the nomination was returned to the president.

| Preceded by Alphonso Jackson | United States Secretary of Housing and Urban Development (acting); 2008 | Succeeded by Steve Preston |
| Preceded by Thomas Ganley Young | Mayor of Syracuse, NY; 1994–2001 | Succeeded by Matthew Driscoll |
