= Steve Preston =

CEO of Goodwill

Steven Preston
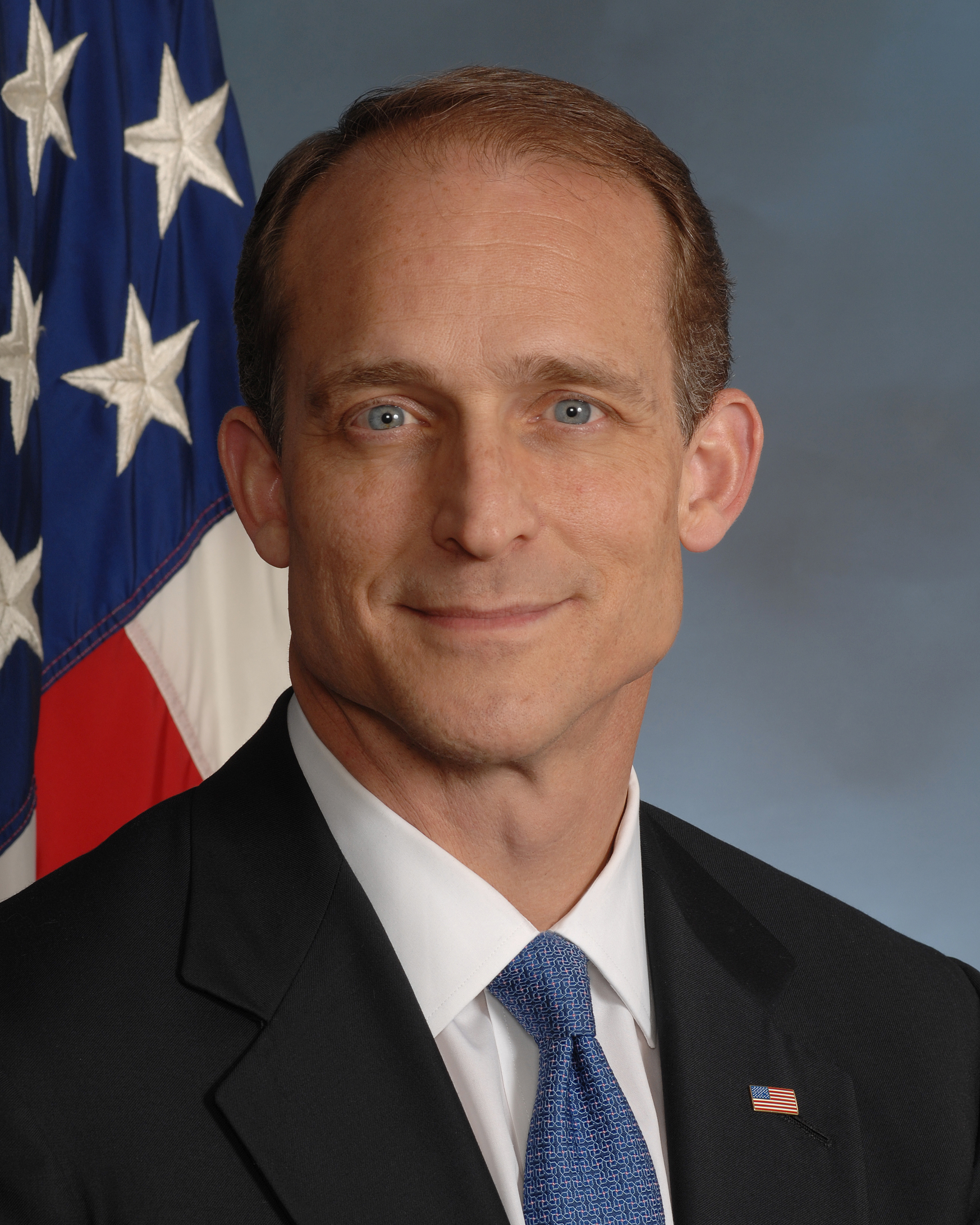

President and CEO of Goodwill Industries International
- Incumbent
- Assumed office January 2019
- Preceded by: Lorna G. Utley (interim)

14th United States Secretary of Housing and Urban Development
- In office June 5, 2008 – January 20, 2009
- President: George W. Bush
- Deputy: Roy Bernardi
- Preceded by: Alphonso Jackson
- Succeeded by: Shaun Donovan

22nd Administrator of the Small Business Administration
- In office July 10, 2006 – June 5, 2008
- President: George W. Bush
- Preceded by: Hector Barreto
- Succeeded by: Karen Mills

Personal details
- Born: August 4, 1960 (age 65) Janesville, Wisconsin, U.S.
- Party: Republican
- Spouse: Molly Preston
- Children: 5
- Education: Northwestern University (BA); University of Chicago (MBA)

Steven C. Preston (born August 4, 1960) is the president and CEO of Goodwill Industries International. He formerly served as the 14th United States secretary of housing and urban development from 2008 to 2009 and the 22nd Administrator of the U.S. Small Business Administration from 2006 until his appointment as HUD Secretary. Before entering public service, Preston spent nearly 25 years in financial and operational leadership positions in the private sector.

== Early life and business career ==
Preston grew up in Janesville, Wisconsin, and attended Parker High School. His mother grew up in Germany during and after World War II and his father was born in an Appalachian coal-mining camp. Preston has four siblings.

Preston earned a B.A. with Highest Distinction in political science from Northwestern University in 1982 and an MBA from the University of Chicago Graduate School of Business in 1985.

During the first half of his private sector career, Preston worked in investment banking and corporate finance. He joined Lehman Brothers in 1985, ultimately serving as a Senior Vice President in the Investment Banking Department.

In 1993, Preston moved to First Data Corporation where he was Senior Vice President and Treasurer. He managed capital structure strategies, financial risk management, and investor relations during a period of rapid growth.

Preston moved to the ServiceMaster Company in 1997, where he served as Executive Vice President and Chief Financial Officer for seven years before heading the company's Strategic Services effort. In 2000, CFO magazine named Preston one of the "Next Wave" of financial executives that would make a difference in the next decade.

== Administrator of the SBA ==
Preston was nominated to be the 22nd administrator of the U.S. Small Business Administration on April 25, 2006. Small business advocates questioned the nomination since Preston had never started or worked for a small business. In his Senate confirmation hearing, Preston said SBA is "a big business that supports the needs of small businesses … an organization that requires sophisticated financial management, operational responsiveness, and a customer service culture among the workforce" and SBA leadership must have "a mind for big business but a heart for small business."

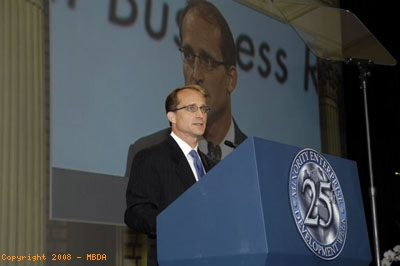
SBA Administrator Preston addresses Minority Enterprise Development Week Conference

Preston was unanimously confirmed by the Senate on June 29, 2006. He took over SBA at a time when the agency was under fire for its disaster loan operation's response to Hurricanes Katrina, Rita, and Wilma. Preston pledged to improve processing and disbursement of SBA disaster loans to storm victims at his confirmation hearing. Ultimately, the agency distributed approximately $6 billion in loans to those victims. Under Preston, SBA completely reworked disaster operations, implementing reforms that cut key processing times for disaster loan applications by up to 90 percent.

On the day Preston was sworn in, CBS "Evening News" criticized the agency's lax enforcement of small business contracting rules, a failure members of Congress said resulted in more than $12 billion in contracts going to large companies like Microsoft and Rolls-Royce. Preston worked to bring transparency to the process by closing loopholes, tightening the small business contract definition, and developing a new scorecard for federal contracting agencies. The SBA ordered agencies to eliminate inaccuracies in the federal small business contracting database and recertify their size status regularly.

In 2006, SBA ranked dead last among federal agencies in the Partnership for Public Service's Best Places to Work Survey. SBA improved its ranking 30 percent in the 2009 survey, the most improved among large federal agencies. The score for SBA leadership improved 36 percent in the survey.

Preston drove many other operational reforms throughout the agency, including changing the loan guaranty program to make it more effective and easier to use. Sen. John Kerry (D-MA) praised the reforms: "Preston is widely credited with correcting major problems at the Small Business Administration … Mr. Preston inherited an agency in disarray, and he's worked hard to right its course and to improve relationships with Congress … We may have some differences on policy, but he's always been professional, responsive, and dedicated to the mission."

== Secretary of Housing and Urban Development ==
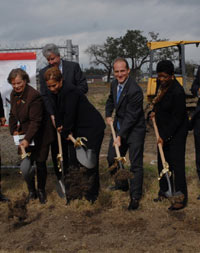
HUD Secretary Preston attends a groundbreaking in New Orleans

With less than nine months left in his Administration, President Bush nominated Preston to be HUD Secretary on April 18, 2008.

As his predecessor departed amid scandal, housing advocates and Senate Banking, Housing, and Urban Affairs Committee chairman Chris Dodd (D-CT) criticized Preston for his lack of housing policy experience. With the housing crisis unfolding, President Bush said he needed someone with Preston's background in finance: "I looked for a leader with an impressive background in finance; someone who understands the important role the housing market plays in the broader economy. I sought a reformer who would act aggressively to help Americans obtain affordable mortgages … and be able to keep their homes. I sought a consensus-builder who's earned the respect of Republicans and Democrats, who can get things done."

Sen. Dodd and his colleagues ultimately supported Preston, who was confirmed by the U.S. Senate by unanimous consent on June 5. (Preston was sworn in the same day.)

During his tenure, the federal government implemented some of the most sweeping and controversial changes to housing and financial policy since the Great Depression, including: the Housing and Economic Recovery Act of 2008; the Economic Stabilization Act of 2008; the Troubled Asset Relief Program; government takeovers of Fannie Mae and Freddie Mac; an expansion of Federal Housing Administration (FHA) refinancing.

Though he emphasized the importance of government action in crisis by saying "mortgage markets have remained open almost entirely due to government support," Preston said the private sector should ultimately restore the housing market. He argued too many homeowners who should be getting help were still falling through the cracks, and urged financial institutions to "be bold" in their actions to assist troubled homeowners. Preston warned the private sector that Congress and state attorneys general would continue to intervene if private financial institutions didn't act strongly enough, specifically citing a congressional plan to allow bankruptcy judges to modify mortgages.

While at HUD, Preston continued to be an outspoken advocate for transparency, effectiveness, and efficiency in government programs. He initiated reforms to enable the FHA to handle its increasing volume of loans; broke ground on two public housing developments in New Orleans that had been on hold due to lack of funding; and finalized regulations that had been stalled since 2002 to help consumers find lower costs mortgages and avoid harmful loan offers.

After leaving Washington, Preston continued to be an active commentator on the housing market and the mortgage crisis. In an October 2010 appearance on CNBC, Preston laid out a path forward, noting, "[W]e've got a situation right now where, you know, the federal government's basically doing all the mortgages. The Fed owns over a trillion dollars worth of mortgage securities. We don't know what that's going to look like going forward. … I think it's absolutely essential that we get on with the task of laying out a path toward a private mortgage finance system in our country." Preston also discussed the causes of, and solutions for, the housing crisis in an April 2011 interview with World magazine.

== Post-Administration work ==
Preston was named President and CEO of Oakleaf Waste Management in August 2009. Oakleaf, the nation's largest company dedicated to providing outsourced waste and recycling services, counts some of the U.S.'s most prominent companies, including Wal-Mart, Sears/Kmart, and PepsiCo, as its clients. Oakleaf provides services in more than 83,000 locations throughout the U.S. and has been named five times to Inc. magazine's list of the fastest growing, privately held companies in the U.S. The company earned nearly $595 million in revenues in 2008 and was number 35 on Inc.'s list in terms of gross dollars of growth.

In November 2010, Oakleaf introduced "Intelligent Waste Management," a new approach to waste management the company said would help its clients reduce "the financial and environmental costs" associated with their waste products. The process, Oakleaf says, transforms waste "into an asset," increasing clients' reputations for sustainability while enhancing productivity. Preston discussed the company's new approach when he co-hosted CNBC's morning show "Squawk Box" on December 22, 2011. The company has also created a blog to update customers on the benefits of the program, and the company's sustainability efforts in general.

While at Oakleaf, Preston also established Oakleaf Cares, an effort to increase the company's involvement in its community, and oversaw a January 2011 move to the company's new headquarters in Windsor, Connecticut.

In 2011, Houston-based Waste Management purchased Oakleaf Global Holdings for $425 million. Waste Management CEO David Steiner said he became interested in Oakleaf in part because of its focus on customer relations. Steiner said, "As our strategic focus has changed, as our focus on the customer has changed, what we realized is you've got a company out there right now [in Oakleaf] that has a great focus on the customer, a great focus on sustainability solutions."

Steiner also praised Preston's tenure at Oakleaf. The two companies had previously worked together, but Steiner said when Preston took over "a lot of the issues we had 10 years ago disappeared. ... Steve came in and put systems in place."

After Waste Management's acquisition of Oakleaf, Preston was appointed Waste Management's Executive Vice President for Finance, Recycling and Energy Services. In that role, he oversaw three business units and served as the principal financial officer for the firm.

Preston left Waste Management in the summer of 2012 to join the presidential transition team for Republican nominee Mitt Romney where he served as a top adviser for the candidate's transition team. After Romney was defeated by President Barack Obama in November 2012, Preston returned to private life.

He was appointed Chief Executive Officer of Toronto-based Livingston International in August 2013. The company is North America's number one business focused on customs brokerage and trade compliance, with operations also in Europe and Asia. Preston's experience "building sustainable platforms for growth" and his "ability to heighten employee engagement and drive a customer service culture" were key attributes for his appointment cited by Livingston International Chairman of the Board John Clancey.

In January 2019 Preston began serving as the president and CEO of Goodwill Industries International. Preston said that his civic experience aligns with Goodwill's mission to help individuals achieve greater independence through employment, adding that, "My goal is to expand the critical impact of that mission...by providing significant support, training, resources and partnerships."

== Personal life ==
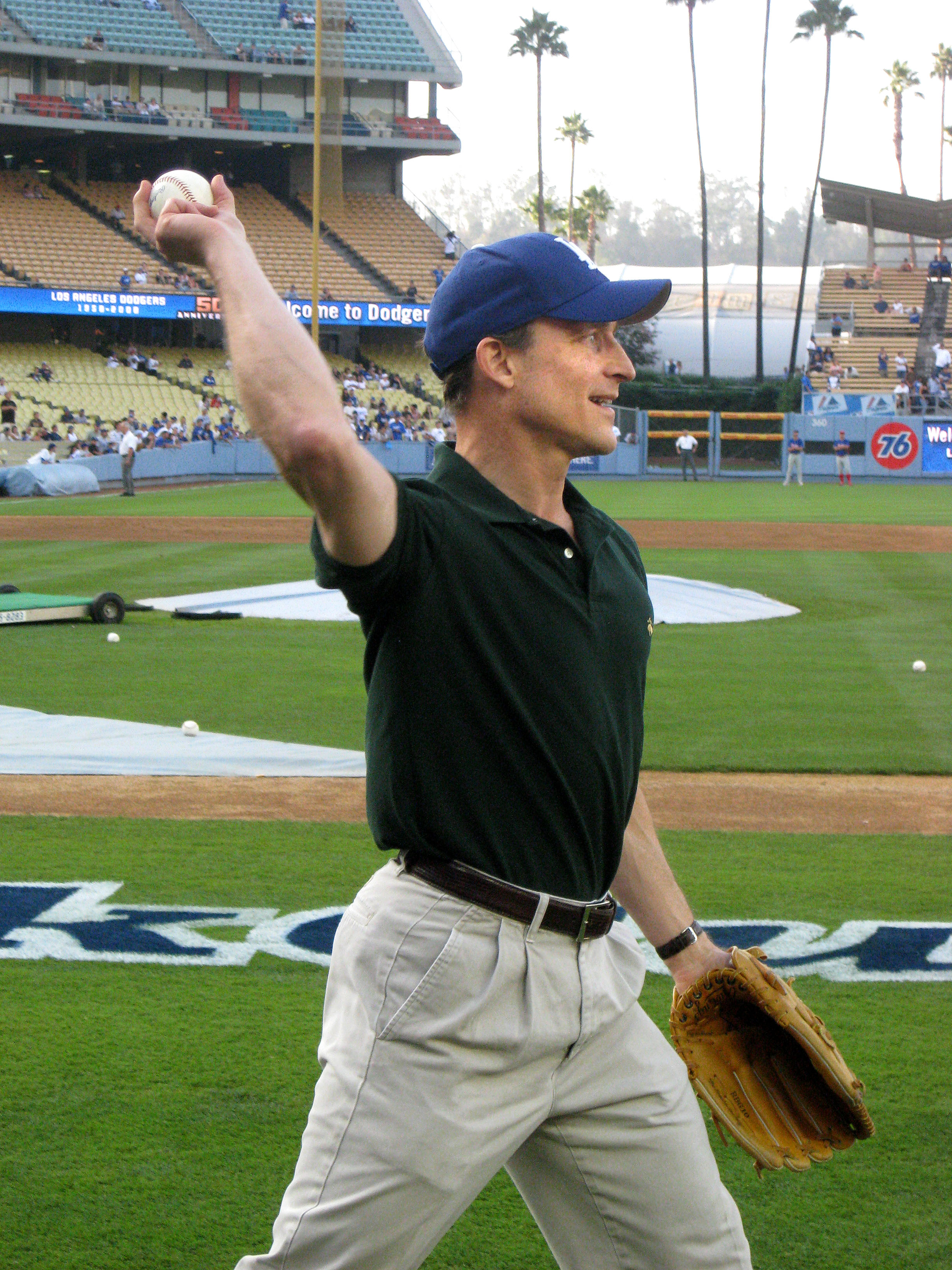
Preston at Dodger stadium in 2008

Preston resides in Chicago with his wife and five children. He has been active with causes that address community improvement, including through past and current volunteer board engagements with the Partnership for Public Service, the Northwestern University Board of Visitors, Sunshine Enterprises, and the Wheaton College Board of Trustees.

Political offices
Preceded by Hector Barreto	Administrator of the Small Business Administration; 2006–2008	Succeeded by Sandy Baruah; Acting
Preceded by Alphonso Jackson	United States Secretary of Housing and Urban Development; 2008–2009	Succeeded by Shaun Donovan
U.S. order of precedence (ceremonial)
Preceded by Ed Schafer as Former U.S. Cabinet Member	Order of precedence of the United States as Former U.S. Cabinet Member	Succeeded by Ken Salazar as Former U.S. Cabinet Member
