= Sandy Baruah =

American politician

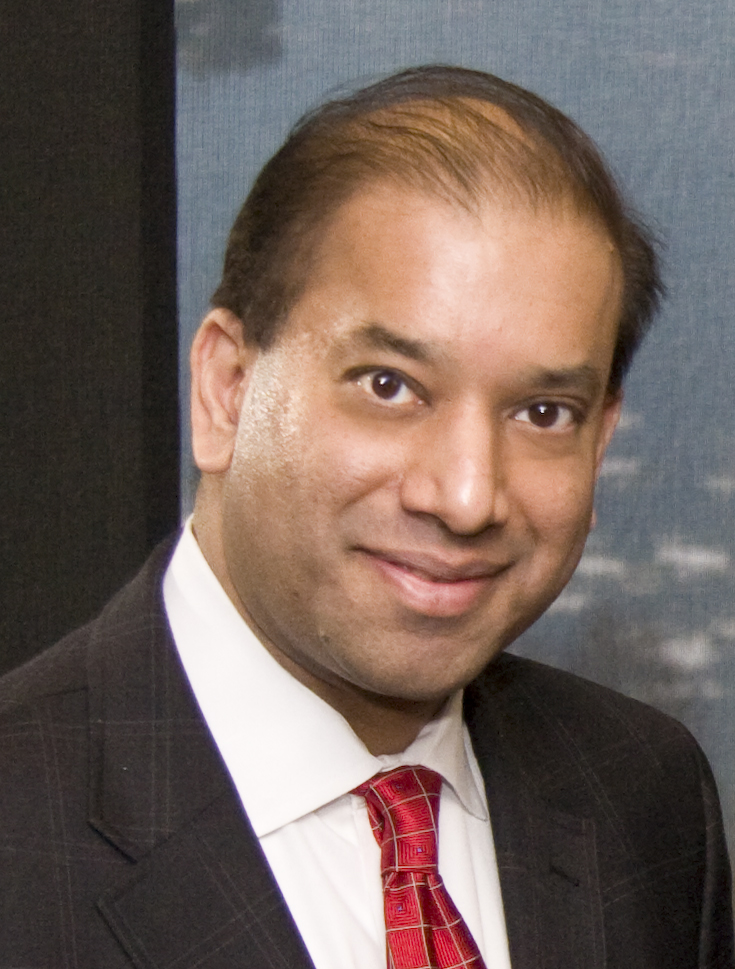

Administrator of the Small Business Administration
- Acting
- In office June 5, 2008 – January 20, 2009
- President: George W. Bush
- Preceded by: Steve Preston
- Succeeded by: Darryl Hairston (acting)

Assistant Secretary of Commerce for Economic Development
- In office 2005–2008
- President: George W. Bush
- Preceded by: David A. Sampson
- Succeeded by: John Fernandez

Personal details
- Born: April 3, 1965 (age 61) Washington, D.C., U.S.
- Party: Republican
- Education: University of Oregon (BS); University of Virginia (attended); Willamette University (MBA)

Santanu K. "Sandy" Baruah is an American politician from the state of Oregon and is the president and chief executive officer of the Detroit Regional Chamber.

== Biography ==
Sandy K. Baruah holds a B.S. from the University of Oregon and an MBA from Willamette University's Atkinson Graduate School of Management.

Baruah served as President George W. Bush’s last (acting) Administrator of the Small Business Administration (SBA). In this role, he was responsible for the SBA's $18 billion small business loan portfolio.

Prior to leading the SBA, Baruah served as U.S. Assistant Secretary of Commerce. In this role he led the federal government's domestic economic development program, the Economic Development Administration (EDA), served as the Senior Advisor to Commerce Secretary Carlos M. Gutierrez regarding the 2010 census and represented the U.S. at the Organisation for Economic Co-operation and Development (OECD) in Paris, France. Baruah led the development and implementation of the Agency's award-winning balanced scorecard.

Prior to his service in the Bush administration, Baruah was a corporate mergers and acquisitions consultant for the Performance Consulting Group. He also served in the administration of President George H. W. Bush (1989–1993) and was on the staff of U.S. Senator Bob Packwood (Oregon).

After leaving his most recent government service in early 2009, he was a Distinguished Fellow at the U.S. Council on Competitiveness, a Washington, D.C.–based think tank composed exclusively of corporate CEOs, university presidents and labor leaders.

In 2010, Baruah was named president and chief executive officer of the Detroit Regional Chamber. The Detroit Regional Chamber is one of the largest regional chambers of commerce in the United States.

In 2017, Baruah was appointed to the Federal Reserve Bank of Chicago - Detroit Branch board of directors.

Political offices
Preceded by Steve Preston	Administrator of the Small Business Administration; Acting; 2008–2009	Succeeded by Darryl Hairston; Acting
