= Carl R. Greene =

Carl R. Greene was the executive director of the Philadelphia Housing Authority (PHA), (March 9, 1998 to September 23, 2010) the fourth largest public housing authority in the nation. On his departure, PHA provided approximately 14,000 units of affordable housing for 80,000 Philadelphia residents and managed the city’s Housing Choice Voucher program. Before heading PHA, Greene held a similar position with the Detroit Housing Commission. He also held senior positions with housing authorities in Atlanta and Washington, DC.

Greene earned a Bachelor of Science Degree in Business Administration from the University of Maryland and a Master of Science in Information Systems Technology from George Washington University. He is a Certified Property Manager with the Institute of Real Estate Management (IREM).

Since 1998, Carl Greene and his staff at PHA managed more than $1.6 billion in redevelopment projects throughout the city. Upon his departure, PHA was administering $126.9 million in HUD stimulus funds to improve and expand affordable housing, rebuild neighborhoods, and create more than 3,000 local jobs.

== Tenure with Controversy ==
While Mr. Greene was working for the PHA, The Philadelphia Inquirer reported: "Greene's tenure has not been without controversy. He is widely known for being a demanding boss willing to discharge employees. He and PHA have faced at least five lawsuits from former employees, including three lawyers and a former public relations officer. In 2008, he was sued by a lawyer who said she had been fired as PHA's top attorney after five days because she would not "engage in any unethical practices." New Jersey lawyer Marcia Allen Phillips said she came to believe that she was being kept in the dark about "secret cases" involving claims of "sexual harassment and wrongful termination" against Greene. Ultimately, she did not pursue the court action". She believed that at the time she filed suit against Carl Greene and PHA, the political climate was "Carl Greene" oriented and therefore many people in high places continued to allow Mr. Greene to thrive despite his obvious inappropriate and/or illegal behavior.

In response to the above Philadelphia Inquirer article, its website cited dozens of negative comments by readers, many complaining that Mr. Greene fired them at will, depending on his mood or whim without any warnings or compensation. Many express unethical and unprofessional behavior on his part at large meetings, such as public humiliation and threats. A full article to this effect appeared on August 29, 2010

Greene has received criticism for his combative style even with government agencies. For instance, although PHA is a state authority, its funded mostly by the U.S. Department of Housing and Urban Development (HUD); during the administration of President George W. Bush, Greene sued the HUD. U.S. District Judge Paul S. Diamond ruled on April 18, 2008 in Philadelphia that HUD acted legally and did not retaliate against the housing authority.

On October 16, 2008, the Philadelphia Housing Authority signed a ten-year agreement with HUD. PHA said that over the next four years it would make sure 760 units of housing were upgraded to be fully accessible for people with disabilities.

== Foreclosure and Tax Lien Scandal ==
On July 27, 2010, Wells Fargo filed a foreclosure action in the First Judicial District of Pennsylvania, Court of Common Pleas, seeking to cure a default of $386,685 on a $400,000 mortgage for Mr. Greene's condominium and primary residence which was valued at $615,035. Such residence located in Naval Square, a Toll Brothers condominium development on the site of the former Philadelphia Naval Asylum.

The Philadelphia Inquirer further revealed that Greene also repaid over $52,000 in back taxes owed in 2010 to settle a lien placed against him by the Internal Revenue Service.

Mr. Greene's budgeted compensation for his work at the Philadelphia Housing Authority for 2010, at approximately $350,000/year, was more than the designated salaries of the Governor for the Commonwealth of Pennsylvania and the mayor of Philadelphia, combined.

== Sexual Harassment Allegations ==
On August 19, 2010, The Philadelphia Inquirer wrote: "Charges of sexual misconduct have shadowed Greene since his arrival in Philadelphia in 1998 from the Detroit Housing Commission. In his former job, a housing-agency auditor accused Greene of kissing, touching, and fondling her, and promising her a promotion if she "submitted to his demands." Rendell, who as mayor at the time headed PHA, hired Greene and gave him a contract that ensured his job even if he lost the Michigan case. The case brought by Gertrude Faye Johnson was settled out of court on the eve of a trial".

At PHA, at least two other cases of sexual harassment have been made against Greene. Melissa Shingles, a former senior management specialist at PHA, filed a complaint with the Pennsylvania Human Relations Commission in 2004. The case was closed in 2006 after a settlement was reached between the sides.

John M. Elliott, an attorney for Elizabeth Helm, a 29-year-old employee of the authority (PHA), has charged Greene of "serial predatory sexual misconduct." Elliott alleges that Greene promised her a promotion in her capacity as an interior designer and planner at PHA, if she submitted to his sexual advances. In a letter outlining Helm's sexual-harassment complaint, Elliott wrote that Greene "insisted" that Helm meet him after work April 12, 2010 at the bar of the Prime Rib Restaurant at 1701 Locust St. to discuss PHA-related matters. Elliot calls her the "most recent victim" of Greene's pattern of sexual harassment. Helm had worked at PHA for about a year. The night of the incident, Greene praised her work and said he was processing her promotion paperwork. He then made advances including "touching, grabbing, and groping her,". Despite her insistence that he stop, Greene "continued to forcibly and physically pursue inappropriate and unwanted contact of an intimate nature." Elliot states that Greene admitted to Helm that his contact was unwelcome, stating as he grabbed her, "I know that you don't want to kiss me." Helm filed a complaint April 30, and an investigation opened May 13. An out of court settlement of $250,000 was offered on August 24, 2010

== Suspension and Suit ==
On August 25, 2010 the PHA board suspended Mr. Greene for 30 days, after receiving a subpoena for documents from the U.S. Attorney's Office working with the FBI. The PHA said it would proceed with its own investigation into the latest sexual harassment claim (and the first three, claiming it had never been notified of their existence -due to technicalities in the settlements- which to its surprise exceeded $650000). HUD launched its own probe as well.

On September 7, 2010 Mr. Greene filed suit against the agency's board of directors, saying its members had "effectively terminated" him without due process, asking for damages in excess of $600,000

== Discharge from PHA ==
Mr. Greene was fired by the PHA Board on September 23, 2010
