= Oncenter =

Arena and convention center in Syracuse, New York

Coordinates: 43.043594°N 76.148199°W

The Oncenter is a three-building convention and entertainment complex in Downtown Syracuse, New York, United States. It is composed of a convention center, sporting arena, and theaters.

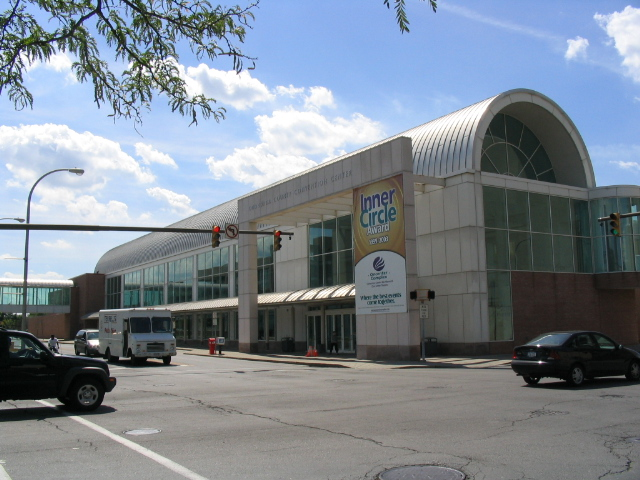
Nicholas J. Pirro Convention Center

== Nicholas J. Pirro Convention Center ==
The Nicholas J. Pirro Convention Center, which opened in 1992, consists of 99,000 square feet (9,200 square meters) of rentable space. It is attached to a 1,000-car parking garage. The convention center is named after Nicholas J. Pirro, 20-year executive of Onondaga County.

== Upstate Medical University Arena ==
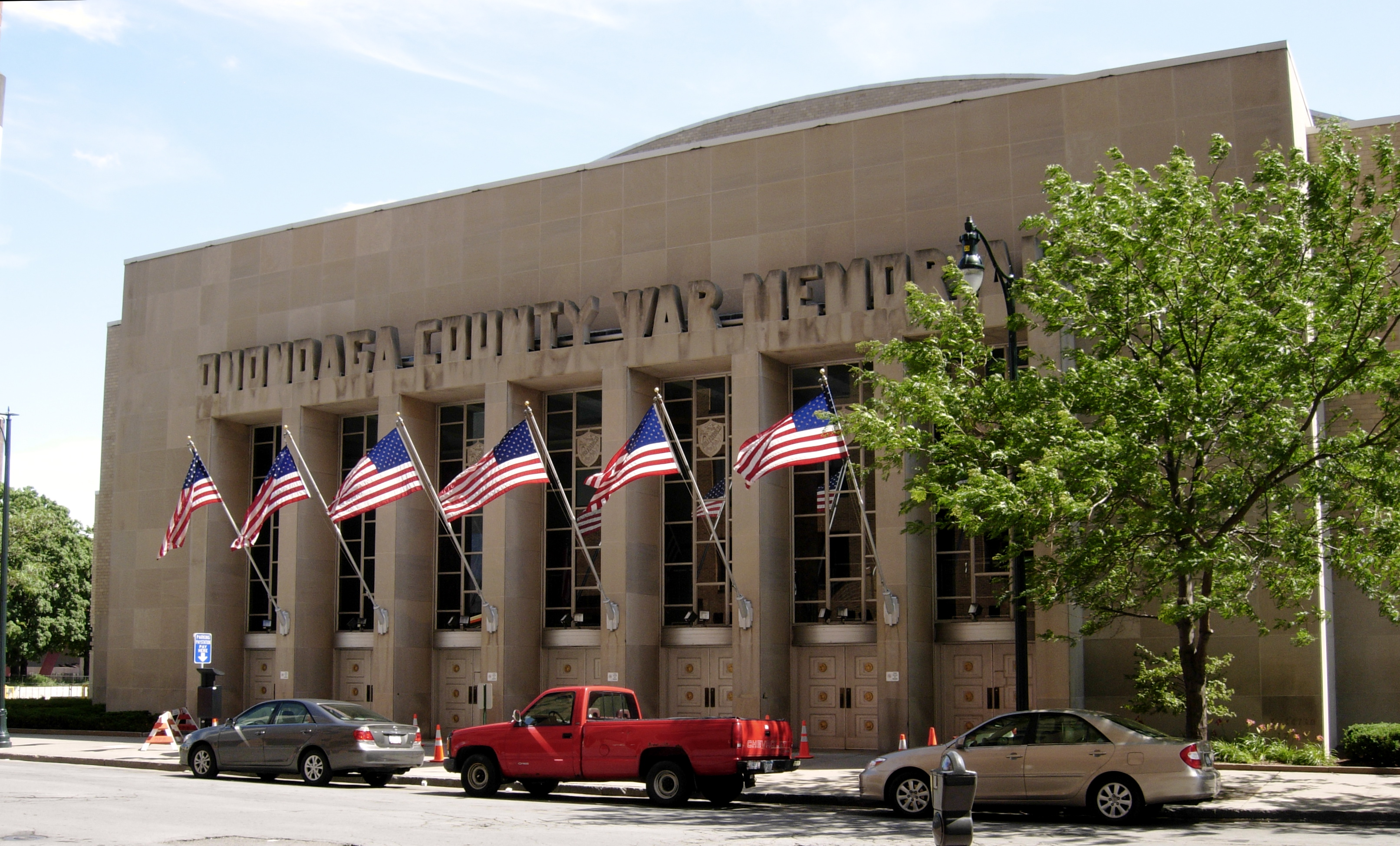
Upstate Medical University Arena

Upstate Medical University Arena at Onondaga County War Memorial is a 6,230-seat multi-purpose arena that has been home to Syracuse's former NBA team, the Syracuse Nationals, as well as several minor-league hockey, football, and lacrosse teams. Since 1994, it has been home to the Syracuse Crunch of the American Hockey League.

== John H. Mulroy Civic Center Theaters ==
The John H. Mulroy Civic Center Theaters at The Oncenter are home to the Syracuse Opera Company. The Crouse-Hinds Theater, the main theater of the center, contains one of the largest stages in Upstate New York and seats 2,117, on three tiers. The other two theaters are the Carrier Theater, with 463 seats, and the Bevard Studio, with 162 seats.

== History ==
October 9, 2026, President Donald Trump held a rally at the Oncenter in support of New York Republican candidates ahead of the 2026 Midterm Elections, including New York Gubernatorial candidate Bruce Blakeman. A man was arrested for allegedly asking a coworker if their boyfriend could buy him a gun to shoot Trump.
