= Oneida Shores Park =

County park in Onondaga County

- Interactive map of Oneida Shores Park
- Type: Public Park
- Location: Cicero, New York
- Coordinates: 43.22480°N 76.107292°W
- Operator: Onondaga County Parks
- Open: All year.
- Website: http://www.onondagacountyparks.com/parks/oneida-shores-park

Oneida Shores Park is a county park in Cicero, New York. It is part of the Onondaga County Parks system.
