= Usha International =

Indian consumer durables company

Usha International Limited
- Type: Private
- Founded: 1934
- Founder: Lala Shri Ram
- Headquarters: Gurgaon, Haryana, India
- Products: Sewing Machines, Fans, Cooking Appliances, Room Heaters, Water Heaters, Irons, Auto Components and Lighting
- Website: usha.com

USHA International is a privately held Indian consumer durables company based in Gurugram, Haryana. Founded in 1934 by Lala Shri Ram, the company's manufacturing capacity has diverged into a wide range of products including sewing machines, fans, kitchen appliances, water coolers, heaters, and lighting. After Lala Shri Ram, the company was led by Charat Ram, followed by Siddharth Shriram, and is currently led by Krishna Shriram. The brand has a pan-India presence with multiple branches, offices and company stores in the country.The brand's ceiling fans and water heaters are widely used across Indian households, especially in tier-2 and tier-3 cities.

== History ==
Usha International has its roots in Jay Engineering, a trading company founded in 1937 by Lala Shriram, that began assembling and selling sewing machines in India. Thereafter the brand added fans to its portfolio in 1944. Over the last nine decades, Usha has diversified its product range to include a wide array of consumer durables offering sewing machines, fans, kitchen appliances, fabric care, water coolers, auto components and lighting (via a sister brand named TISVA).

== Partnerships – past and current ==
USHA International has formed strategic partnerships with several companies, including:

- Janome - USHA's partnership with Janome Corporation began in 1993 when it first started marketing Janome sewing machines in India.
- Hunter - USHA's partnership with Hunter Fan Company dates back to the year 2001. Both brands came together to provide a premium range of fans.
- Honeywell - USHA partnered with Honeywell in 2012 to launch a range of internationally designed evaporative room air coolers.
- Honda - USHA's relationship with Honda goes back to 1985 when Honda Siel Power Products (formerly Shriram Honda Power Equipment Ltd) was started as a joint venture (JV) between Honda and USHA International. The venture was later ended in 2012.
- Rinnai Corporation - (Storage Water Heaters)
- Midea - (Home Appliances)

== USHA initiatives ==
Usha, through the Usha Silai School program, has been able to reach out to thousands of women across the country and help them empower themselves. Besides the Silai School initiative, Usha has been supporting and promoting various sporting activities across rural, national and international events.

=== Silai School ===
The USHA Silai School is a self-employment model where women are trained in sewing. This enables the trained women to earn by setting up their own business, teach sewing to other women in their rural areas also by providing sewing machine maintenance services. USHA, in collaboration with local NGOs, have set up these schools in remote rural areas, fostering a network of self-reliant women entrepreneurs. To date, over 1,350,000 learners have been trained with 35,673 Silai Schools across India.

=== Sports ===
Under the initiative of Usha Play, the brand focuses on promoting traditional sports by supporting regional and hyper-local sports events. In addition, it also supports national and international leagues and sporting activities. USHA has been partnering with the Mumbai Indians cricket team in the Indian Premier League (IPL), and the Women's Premiere League (WPL). Usha also focuses on other indigenous sports like Turai Kar, Mardani Khel, Karra and Kathi Samu, Kalari Payattu, to name a few. In addition, Usha has also been supporting the Ladies Amateur Open Golf over many years.
