= Nicholas J. Pirro =

American politician (born 1940)

2nd Executive of Onondaga County, New York
- In office January 1, 1988 – December 31, 2007
- Preceded by: John H. Mulroy
- Succeeded by: Joanne M. Mahoney

Personal details
- Born: May 29, 1940 (age 86) Syracuse, New York, U.S
- Party: Republican
- Spouse: Patti Pirro
- Education: Le Moyne College (BA)

Nicholas J. Pirro Jr. (born May 29, 1940) is a New York politician most notable for having served as county executive of Onondaga County, New York.

Pirro was born on Syracuse's North Side to Nicholas Sr. and Camille. He attended Our Lady of Pompeii School and Christian Brothers Academy and graduated from Le Moyne College in 1964 with a degree in business management. He entered politics at age 22, serving as campaign manager for a bowling alley operator who was running for the Onondaga County Board of Supervisors. He served one term as supervisor and ten terms as county legislator.

He served as Chairman of the County Legislature starting in 1980. After his predecessor announced his retirement in 1987, Pirro clinched the Republican nomination for County Executive and won the November election He served a total of five terms in office.

The Onondaga County Convention Center is named in his honor.

He is married to Patti Pirro, and continues to reside in Syracuse.

Political offices
| Preceded by | Onondaga County, New York Supervisor from Syracuse Ninth Ward; June, 1965 – December 31, 1967 | Succeeded by (Position abolished) |
| Preceded by (Position created) | Onondaga County, New York Legislator, Sixteenth Election District; January 1, 1968 – December 31, 1987 | Succeeded by Alexander DeLucia |
| Preceded by John H. Mulroy | Onondaga County, New York Executive; January 1, 1988 – December 31, 2007 | Succeeded by Joanne M. Mahoney |
