= Hector Barreto Jr. =

American businessman

Hector Barreto
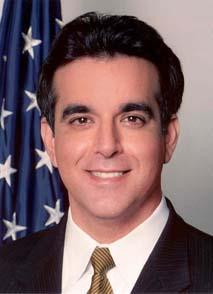

21st Administrator of the Small Business Administration
- In office July 25, 2001 – July 2, 2006
- President: George W. Bush
- Preceded by: Aída Álvarez
- Succeeded by: Steve Preston

Personal details
- Born: May 13, 1961 (age 65) Kansas City, Missouri, U.S.
- Party: Republican
- Spouse: Robin Barreto
- Children: 2 daughters 1 son
- Parent: Hector Barreto Sr.
- Education: Rockhurst University (BBA)

Hector Vincent Barreto Jr. (born May 13, 1961) is an American public servant who served as the 21st administrator of the U.S. Small Business Administration, confirmed on July 25, 2001. George W. Bush nominated him to the post. He resigned on July 2, 2006.

== Administrator of the SBA ==
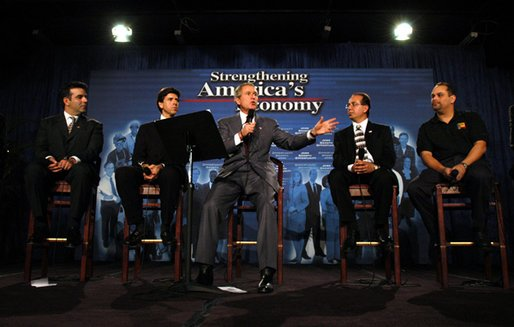
Barreto and President George W. Bush at a forum with small business owners and employees in February 2003

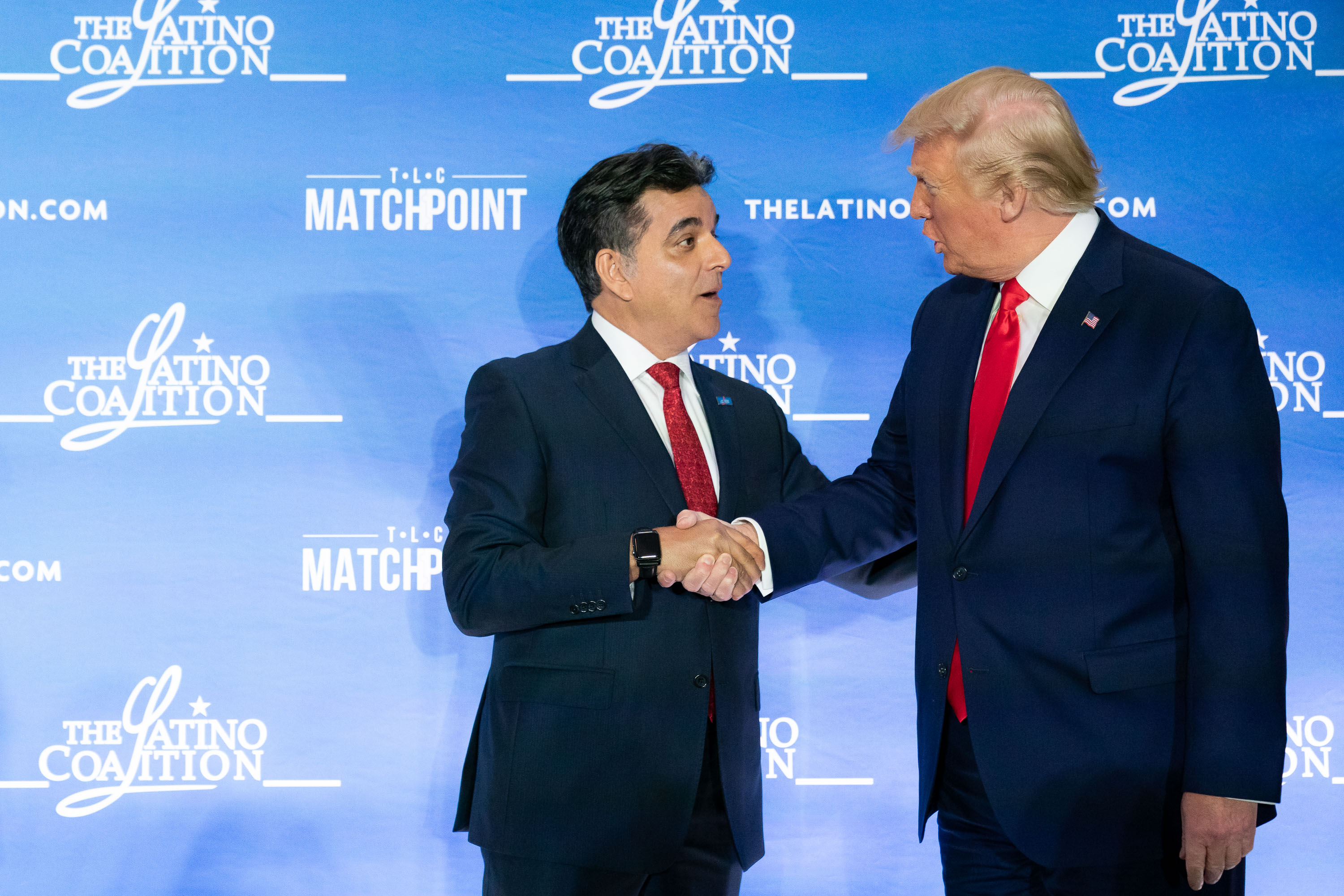
Barreto greeting President Donald Trump in March 2020

In July 2001, Hector Barreto was unanimously confirmed by the U.S. Senate as the 21st administrator of the U.S. Small Business Administration. In this capacity, he oversaw the delivery of financial and business development tools to America's entrepreneurs. With a portfolio of direct and guaranteed business loans and disaster loans worth more than $45 billion, the SBA is the largest single financial backer and facilitator of technical assistance and contracting opportunities for the nation's small businesses. Barreto also sat as an ex officio member of the President's Advisory Commission on Educational Excellence for Hispanic Americans.

Political offices
Preceded by John Whitmore; Acting	Administrator of the Small Business Administration; 2001–2006	Succeeded by Steve Preston
