= Hector Barreto Sr. =

American entrepreneur

Hector Vincent Carrillo Barreto Sr. was a Kansas City entrepreneur. He was an advocate for the political and economic growth of Mexican-Americans and Latinos. Barreto Sr. was a founder of the United States Hispanic Chamber of Commerce (USHCC) and served as part of President Ronald Reagan's transition team.

== Early life ==
Barreto Sr. was born in Guadalajara, Jalisco, Mexico, on August 23, 1935. Although he could have attended college, Barreto dropped out high school his junior year. By age 16, he worked alongside his father as a livestock dealer, where he was earning about $200 a day. He eventually began his own business, but by the age of 17, he lost it all. In 1958, Barreto immigrated to the United States where he worked in agriculture picking potatoes in a farm near Corning, Missouri.

In 1960, Barreto married Mary Louise Tejeda, and settled in Independence, Missouri. In order to support his growing family, Barreto worked two jobs: one working in a meatpacking house in Kansas City, Kansas, and the second laying tracks for the Missouri Pacific Railroad.

Barreto immigrated to the US in his early twenties, and started working as a potato digger on a farm in Missouri. He then moved to Kansas City, where he worked as a school custodian and in a packinghouse to save money to open a restaurant.

Despite working as a manual laborer, he never lost his entrepreneur spirit. Barreto visited numerous banks in hopes of obtaining a loan to open a restaurant, yet banks rejected his applications citing he had "no track record" of being a businessman. After 10 rejections, Barreto decided to borrow a $5,000 high interest home improvement loan to open his restaurant.

With his wife, Mary Louise Tejeda Barreto, he opened Mexico Lindo Restaurant in 1966 in Independence, MO. eventually, he owned three more restaurants, a title company, and a construction firm in Kansas City. He noticed that other Hispanic business owners had disadvantages in the Kansas City area, so in 1978 he formed the Kansas City Hispanic Chamber of Commerce in 1978 with other Hispanic business owners. The United States Hispanic Chamber of Commerce (USHCC) was inspired by this effort; it was incorporated in New Mexico in 1979. Barreto was the first president of the USHCC, which was originally based in Kansas City. He was named Chairman Emeritus of the organization, and is a member of the League of United Latin American Citizen's Hall of Fame. The USHCC has a scholarship fund named in his honor.

Barreto worked as an adviser on Latino perspectives for Carter, Reagan, and the first Bush administration. He became a part of Reagan's "kitchen cabinet".

His son, Hector Barreto Jr., was the administrator of the Small Business Administration under George W. Bush.

== Death ==
Hector Barreto Sr. died on May 14, 2004, in his hometown of Guadalajara, after a battle with pancreatic cancer. After his death, the USHCC Foundation established a scholarship fund in his honor.
