= Jeld-Wen =

American manufacturing company

JELD-WEN Windows and Doors
- Company type: Public
- Traded as: NYSE: JELD; Russell 2000 Component
- Industry: Building Products
- Founded: 1960
- Headquarters: Charlotte, North Carolina
- Key people: Bill Christensen, CEO
- Products: Exterior & Interior Doors, Wall Systems, Wood, Vinyl & Aluminum Windows, Shower Enclosures, Closet Systems, Moldings & Trim Board, Lumber and Glass, Staircases, Hardware and Locks, Cabinets, Molded Door Skins
- Brands: AuraLast, MiraTEC, Extira, LaCANTINA, Karona, ImpactGuard, Aurora, IWP, Stegbar, Regency, William Russel Doors, Airlite, Trend, The Perfect Fit, Aneeta, Breezway, Corinthian, Swedoor, Dooria, DANA, A&L and Alupan
- Revenue: ▼$4.29 billion (2019) ▲$4.35 billion (2018)
- Net income: US$ 357.5 million (2016) US$ 90.9 million (2015)
- Number of employees: 23,300 (2020)
- Website: www.jeld-wen.com

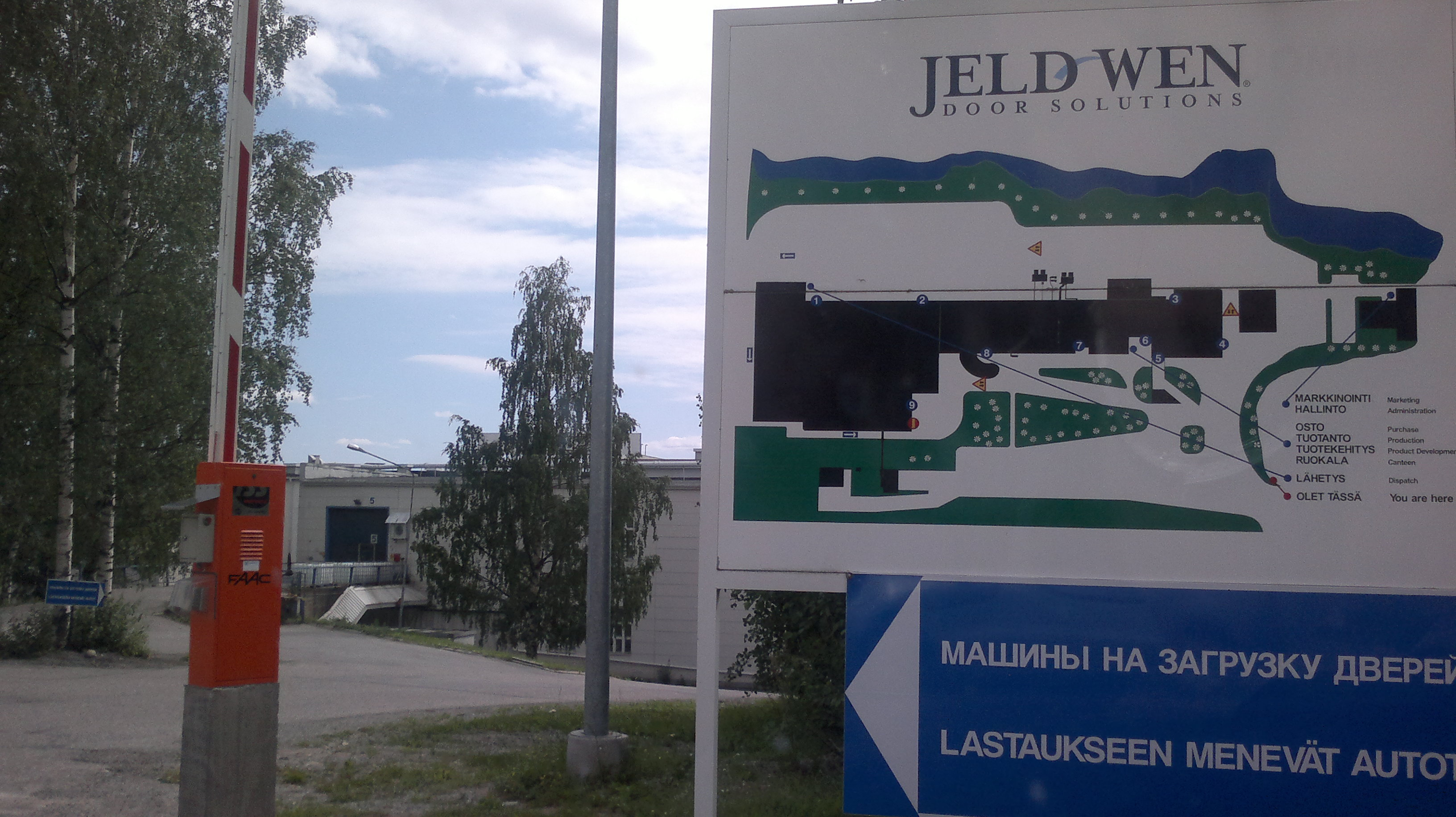
Jeld-Wen in Kuopio, Finland

JELD-WEN is an American company with its headquarters in Charlotte, North Carolina. The company operates more than 120 manufacturing facilities in 19 countries. JELD-WEN designs, produces and distributes interior and exterior doors, wood, vinyl and aluminum windows, wall systems, shower enclosures, closet systems and other components used in the new construction, as well as repair and remodel of residential homes and non-residential buildings.

== History ==
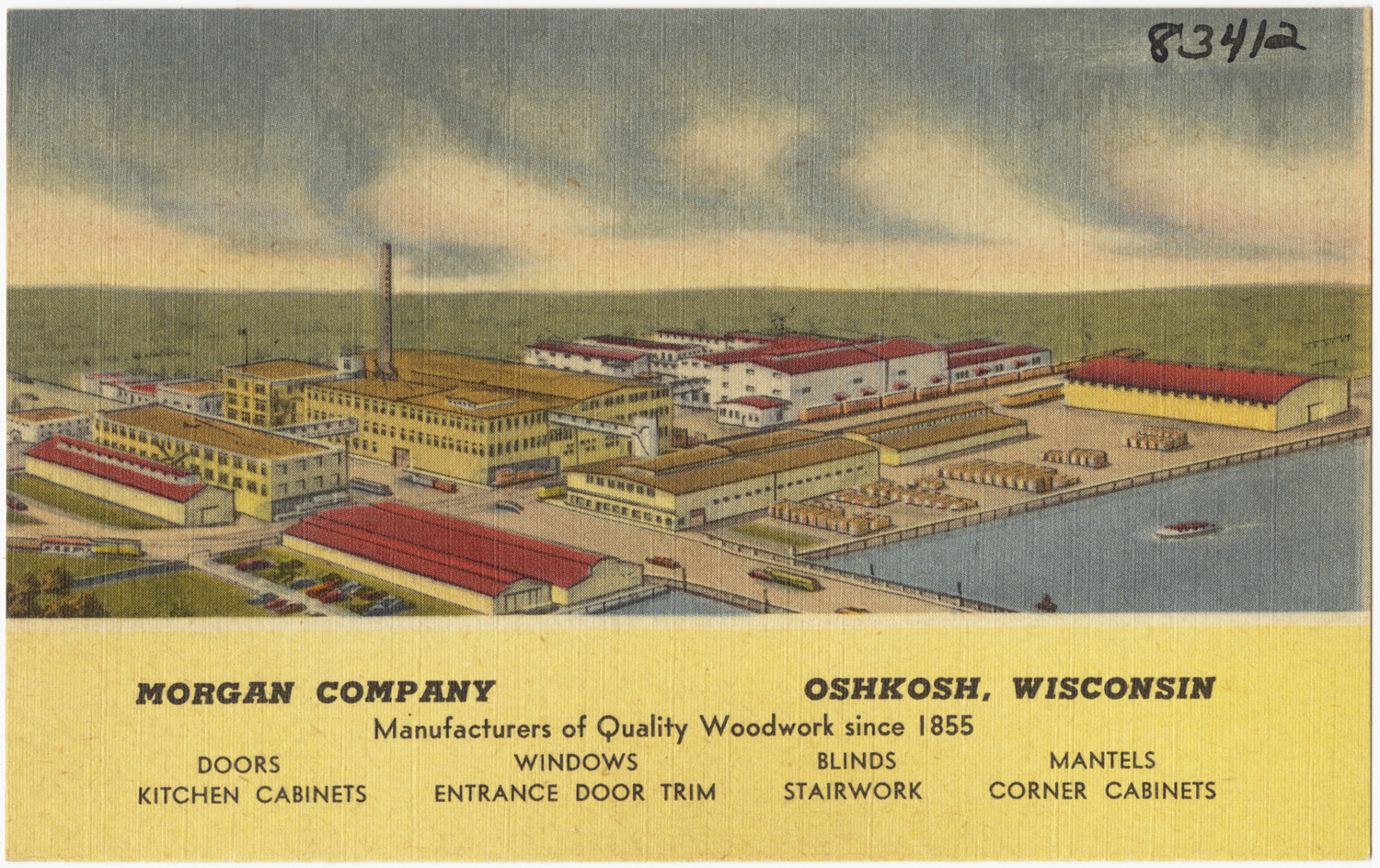
Jeld-Wen predecessor company Morgan Manufacturing, Oskosh, Wisconsin. The Morgan Manufacturing plant was shut down in 2009.

JELD-WEN was founded in 1960 by Richard "Dick" Wendt when he, together with four business partners, bought a millwork plant in Klamath Falls, Oregon. The company first established operations to support their millwork business and later added other materials to its offering including fiber, vinyl, aluminum and steel.

During the 1970s and 1980s, JELD-WEN grew through vertical integration and acquisition. By 1989, JELD-WEN was ranked seventh among privately held companies in Oregon with revenues of more than $350 million.

Throughout the 1990s, JELD-WEN continued diversification efforts, moving into additional areas of service and expanding to new countries and continents. In 1996, Forbes ranked JELD-WEN at 225 of the nation's top 500 privately owned companies. In 1997, it was ranked 119 and revenues were estimated at $1.39 billion.

By the early 2000s, JELD-WEN was operating throughout the United States, Canada, Mexico, Chile, Europe, Australia, and Asia. JELD-WEN also diversified in to the home center business and began selling through big-box retailers. The Asian operations were divested in 2023.

JELD-WEN was recapitalized by Onex Corporation in 2011 following the housing market downturn. JELD-WEN went public through an IPO on the New York Stock Exchange on January 27, 2017. The company completed a secondary offering in May 2017.

In 2016, door manufacturer Steves & Sons sued JELD-WEN on antitrust grounds for its 2012 acquisition of rival doorskin manufacturer Craftmaster International (CMI). In 2021 the Fourth Circuit affirmed the trial judge's remedy that JELD-WEN must sell CMI's Towanda factory, which was the first time that a private lawsuit led to an order to divest. In 2023, Towanda sold the plant to a subsidiary of private equity company Platinum Equity Advisors, LLC.

== Recent Acquisitions ==
From 2015 to 2017, the company completed nine acquisitions, including DOORIA, Aneeta, Karona, LaCantina, Trend, Breezway, Mattiovi Oy, Milliken Millworks, and Kolder Group.

== JELD-WEN Brands ==
JELD-WEN brands include JELD-WEN, AuraLast, MiraTEC, Extira, LaCANTINA, Karona, ImpactGuard, Aurora, IWP, Stegbar, Regency, William Russel Doors, Airlite, Trend, The Perfect Fit, Aneeta, Breezway, Corinthian, Swedoor, Dooria, DANA, A&L and Alupan.

== JELD-WEN in Canada ==
JELD-WEN expanded its operations outside the United States in 1990, establishing two locations in Canada. This marked the beginning of its significant presence in the Canadian market.

In 1996, JELD-WEN acquired a plant originally established in 1973 by Donat Flamand Windows and Doors. The products from this acquisition are sold in Canada under the JELD-WEN DF® Collection.

The company continued its expansion in 1997 with the addition of two more plants. One of these plants, founded in 1957 by the Flamand family, is located in St. Henri and specializes in door manufacturing. The other plant, Willmar Windows, is located in Winnipeg, Manitoba, and its products are sold in Canada as the JELD-WEN Willmar® Collection.

In 1998, JELD-WEN purchased United Windows and Doors, which was established in 1960 in Concord, Ontario. This plant was later relocated to Woodbridge in 2004, and its products are sold in Canada as the JELD-WEN United Collection.

JELD-WEN has made significant investments in its St. Henri plant in 2005 and 2021 to enhance production capabilities.

In 2023, JELD-WEN relocated its Canadian headquarters to a new facility in Mississauga, Ontario, further solidifying its presence and operations in Canada.

== See also ==
- List of companies based in North Carolina
