= Dallas Housing Authority =

Public housing authority of Dallas, Texas, United States

Dallas Housing Authority (DHA) is the public housing authority of Dallas, Texas.

The Mayor of Dallas appoints the DHA's five-member governing board, and the board selects the DHA's president.

== History ==
In 1937 the Housing Act was passed by the U.S. federal government, and the Dallas City Council established the DHA in 1938.

== Properties ==
Family

- Brackins Village
- Buckeye Trail Family Residences
- Carroll Townhomes
- Cedar Springs Place
- Conner Drive Single Family Homes
- Estell Village
- Frankford Townhomes
- Barbara Jordan Square Family Homes
- Roseland Estates
  - Circa 2000 the DHA had plans to redevelop the former Roseland Homes complex and expand the size of the development. Several residents from the nearby Roseland neighborhood protested the redevelopment plans as they did not wish to have public housing in their community.
