= List of bus routes in Onondaga County, New York =

The following routes are operated by CNYRTA's CNY Centro division, in and around the City of Syracuse and Onondaga, Cayuga, and Oswego counties.

Base Route	Terminals		Major streets	Areas & Landmarks served
8 Syrculator	Centro Transit HUB	8: W. Washington & S. Clinton Streets	Salina Street, Franklin Street, Washington Street, S. State Street, Harrison Street	Onondaga County Central Library, Clinton Square, Franklin Square, City Hall, City & County Government buildings, War Memorial, Everson Museum: Free Downtown Syracuse circulator
10 S. Salina St	Centro Transit HUB	110: Valley Plaza	South Salina Street	One Centro Center, Upstate University Hospital, Valley Plaza, Clary Middle School, Green Hills Farms Shopping Center, Nedrow
10 S. Salina St	Centro Transit HUB	410: Conklin Ave	South Salina Street	One Centro Center, Upstate University Hospital, Valley Plaza, Clary Middle School, Green Hills Farms Shopping Center, Nedrow
16 N. Salina St	Centro Transit HUB	16: Regional Transportation Center & Destiny USA	North Salina Street, 1st North Street, Buckley Road, 7th North Street, Old Liverpool Road, Electronics Parkway	Little Italy, Regional Transportation Center, Destiny USA, Lockheed Martin, Liverpool
16 N. Salina St	Centro Transit HUB	116: 7th North Street	North Salina Street, 1st North Street, Buckley Road, 7th North Street, Old Liverpool Road, Electronics Parkway	Little Italy, Regional Transportation Center, Destiny USA, Lockheed Martin, Liverpool
16 N. Salina St	Centro Transit HUB	216: Electronics Parkway	North Salina Street, 1st North Street, Buckley Road, 7th North Street, Old Liverpool Road, Electronics Parkway	Little Italy, Regional Transportation Center, Destiny USA, Lockheed Martin, Liverpool
16 N. Salina St	Centro Transit HUB	316: Electronics Parkway via Old Liverpool Road	North Salina Street, 1st North Street, Buckley Road, 7th North Street, Old Liverpool Road, Electronics Parkway	Little Italy, Regional Transportation Center, Destiny USA, Lockheed Martin, Liverpool
20 James St	Centro Transit HUB	20: Eastwood – Lamson Street	James Street, Midler Avenue, Molloy Road	Bryant & Stratton College, Lincoln Middle School, Eastwood, Hancock Airpark
20 James St	Centro Transit HUB	120: Midler Ave	James Street, Midler Avenue, Molloy Road	Bryant & Stratton College, Lincoln Middle School, Eastwood, Hancock Airpark
20 James St	Centro Transit HUB	220: Hancock Airpark	James Street, Midler Avenue, Molloy Road	Bryant & Stratton College, Lincoln Middle School, Eastwood, Hancock Airpark
21 James St - Sunnycrest	Centro Transit HUB	21: Sunnycrest Road	James Street, Teall Avenue, Sunnycrest Road	Bryant & Stratton College, Lincoln Middle School, Henninger High School, Shop City, Eastwood
21 James St - Sunnycrest	Centro Transit HUB	121: Sunnycrest Road via Shop City	James Street, Teall Avenue, Sunnycrest Road	Bryant & Stratton College, Lincoln Middle School, Henninger High School, Shop City, Eastwood
22 James St - Rt. 298	Centro Transit HUB	22: Rt. 298/Carrier Circle	James Street, Thompson Road, Fly Road	Bryant & Stratton College, Lincoln Middle School, Eastwood, Carrier Circle
22 James St - Rt. 298	Centro Transit HUB	122: East Syracuse via Fly Road	James Street, Thompson Road, Fly Road	Bryant & Stratton College, Lincoln Middle School, Eastwood, Carrier Circle
23 James St - East Syracuse	Centro Transit HUB	23: East Syracuse	James Street, Manlius Street, Fremont Road, Kirkville Road	Bryant & Stratton College, Lincoln Middle School, Eastwood, East Syracuse, Minoa
23 James St - East Syracuse	Centro Transit HUB	123: East Syracuse Walmart	James Street, Manlius Street, Fremont Road, Kirkville Road	Bryant & Stratton College, Lincoln Middle School, Eastwood, East Syracuse, Minoa
23 James St - East Syracuse	Centro Transit HUB	323/323X: Minoa	James Street, Manlius Street, Fremont Road, Kirkville Road	Bryant & Stratton College, Lincoln Middle School, Eastwood, East Syracuse, Minoa
26 South Ave	Centro Transit HUB	26: Corcoran High School	South Avenue, Bellevue Avenue, West Onondaga Avenue & West Onondaga Street, Valley Drive, Onondaga Road, Velasko Road	Corcoran High School, Community General Hospital, Onondaga Community College, Van Duyn Nursing Home, Onondaga Hill: 226X, 426, 526 - trips continue on South Avenue and do not serve Bellevue or Onondaga Avenues
26 South Ave	Centro Transit HUB	126: Upstate Hospital at Community General	South Avenue, Bellevue Avenue, West Onondaga Avenue & West Onondaga Street, Valley Drive, Onondaga Road, Velasko Road	Corcoran High School, Community General Hospital, Onondaga Community College, Van Duyn Nursing Home, Onondaga Hill: 226X, 426, 526 - trips continue on South Avenue and do not serve Bellevue or Onondaga Avenues
26 South Ave	Centro Transit HUB	226/226X: Onondaga Community College	South Avenue, Bellevue Avenue, West Onondaga Avenue & West Onondaga Street, Valley Drive, Onondaga Road, Velasko Road	Corcoran High School, Community General Hospital, Onondaga Community College, Van Duyn Nursing Home, Onondaga Hill: 226X, 426, 526 - trips continue on South Avenue and do not serve Bellevue or Onondaga Avenues
26 South Ave	Centro Transit HUB	326: High Acres via Onondaga Community College	South Avenue, Bellevue Avenue, West Onondaga Avenue & West Onondaga Street, Valley Drive, Onondaga Road, Velasko Road	Corcoran High School, Community General Hospital, Onondaga Community College, Van Duyn Nursing Home, Onondaga Hill: 226X, 426, 526 - trips continue on South Avenue and do not serve Bellevue or Onondaga Avenues
26 South Ave	Centro Transit HUB	426: Upstate Hospital at Community General via Valley Drive	South Avenue, Bellevue Avenue, West Onondaga Avenue & West Onondaga Street, Valley Drive, Onondaga Road, Velasko Road	Corcoran High School, Community General Hospital, Onondaga Community College, Van Duyn Nursing Home, Onondaga Hill: 226X, 426, 526 - trips continue on South Avenue and do not serve Bellevue or Onondaga Avenues
26 South Ave	Centro Transit HUB	526: Onondaga Community College via Valley Drive	South Avenue, Bellevue Avenue, West Onondaga Avenue & West Onondaga Street, Valley Drive, Onondaga Road, Velasko Road	Corcoran High School, Community General Hospital, Onondaga Community College, Van Duyn Nursing Home, Onondaga Hill: 226X, 426, 526 - trips continue on South Avenue and do not serve Bellevue or Onondaga Avenues
30 SU - Westcott	Centro Transit HUB	130: Nottingham High School	Irving Avenue, Waverly Avenue, Euclid Avenue, Westcott Street, East Genesee Street, Erie Boulevard East, Bridge Street	University Hill, Upstate University Hospital, Syracuse University, Nottingham High School, Dewitt, East Syracuse
30 SU - Westcott	Centro Transit HUB	230: Menorah Park	Irving Avenue, Waverly Avenue, Euclid Avenue, Westcott Street, East Genesee Street, Erie Boulevard East, Bridge Street	University Hill, Upstate University Hospital, Syracuse University, Nottingham High School, Dewitt, East Syracuse
30 SU - Westcott	Centro Transit HUB	330 Wegman’s Dewitt Park-N-Ride	Irving Avenue, Waverly Avenue, Euclid Avenue, Westcott Street, East Genesee Street, Erie Boulevard East, Bridge Street	University Hill, Upstate University Hospital, Syracuse University, Nottingham High School, Dewitt, East Syracuse
30 SU - Westcott	Centro Transit HUB	530: East Syracuse Walmart	Irving Avenue, Waverly Avenue, Euclid Avenue, Westcott Street, East Genesee Street, Erie Boulevard East, Bridge Street	University Hill, Upstate University Hospital, Syracuse University, Nottingham High School, Dewitt, East Syracuse
36 Camillus	Centro Transit HUB	36: Camillus	West Genesee Street, South State Street, Erie Boulevard West	Nation Grid, Westvale, Fairmount, West Genesee High School, Camillus Commons, Camillus
36 Camillus	Centro Transit HUB	136: Camillus Commons	West Genesee Street, South State Street, Erie Boulevard West	Nation Grid, Westvale, Fairmount, West Genesee High School, Camillus Commons, Camillus
38 Auburn - Syracuse	Centro Transit HUB	138: Auburn, NY	Grand Ave, Howlett Hill Road, Old Seneca Turnpike, Genesee Street	Western Lights, Township 5, Camillus Commons, Marcellus, Welch Allyn, Auburn
38 Auburn - Syracuse	Auburn	238: Camillus Commons	Grand Ave, Howlett Hill Road, Old Seneca Turnpike, Genesee Street	Western Lights, Township 5, Camillus Commons, Marcellus, Welch Allyn, Auburn
40 SU - Hospitals	Centro Transit HUB	40: Syracuse University	Adams Street, Irving Avenue, Waverly Avenue, Comstock Avenue, East Colvin Street, Brighton Avenue	Upstate University Hospital, Syracuse University, Outer Comstock, Meadowbrook, Drumlins Country Club, Nob Hill Apartments, Iroquois Nursing Home
40 SU - Hospitals	Centro Transit HUB	140: Thurber Street	Adams Street, Irving Avenue, Waverly Avenue, Comstock Avenue, East Colvin Street, Brighton Avenue	Upstate University Hospital, Syracuse University, Outer Comstock, Meadowbrook, Drumlins Country Club, Nob Hill Apartments, Iroquois Nursing Home
40 SU - Hospitals	Centro Transit HUB	240: Nob Hill	Adams Street, Irving Avenue, Waverly Avenue, Comstock Avenue, East Colvin Street, Brighton Avenue	Upstate University Hospital, Syracuse University, Outer Comstock, Meadowbrook, Drumlins Country Club, Nob Hill Apartments, Iroquois Nursing Home
40 SU - Hospitals	Centro Transit HUB	340: Drumlins	Adams Street, Irving Avenue, Waverly Avenue, Comstock Avenue, East Colvin Street, Brighton Avenue	Upstate University Hospital, Syracuse University, Outer Comstock, Meadowbrook, Drumlins Country Club, Nob Hill Apartments, Iroquois Nursing Home
40 SU - Hospitals	College Place	340C: Drumlins	Adams Street, Irving Avenue, Waverly Avenue, Comstock Avenue, East Colvin Street, Brighton Avenue	Upstate University Hospital, Syracuse University, Outer Comstock, Meadowbrook, Drumlins Country Club, Nob Hill Apartments, Iroquois Nursing Home
43 Main Campus	College Place	43: West Campus	Irving Avenue, Waverly Avenue, East Fayette Street, East Genesee Street, Westcott Street,	Flint Hall, Brewster-Boland Hall, Archbold Gym, Carrier Dome, SUNY ESF, Syracuse Stage, Schine Student Center, Bird Library: Syracuse University campus shuttle route. Operates only when classes are in session August - May. Students and staff ride free; 243 - Operates in counter-clockwise loop, serving Westcott Street, then East Genesee Street and West Campus; 343 - Operates in clock-wise loop, serving East Genesee Street, then Westcott street; 443 - After arriving at College Place, trips continue to South Campus
43 Main Campus	College Place	243: East Genesee & University Ave	Irving Avenue, Waverly Avenue, East Fayette Street, East Genesee Street, Westcott Street,	
43 Main Campus	College Place	343: Westcott Street & Euclid Avenue	Irving Avenue, Waverly Avenue, East Fayette Street, East Genesee Street, Westcott Street,	
43 Main Campus	College Place	443: The Warehouse	Irving Avenue, Waverly Avenue, East Fayette Street, East Genesee Street, Westcott Street,	
44 Manley Field House	College Place	44: Manley South Parking Lot	Comstock Avenue, Small Road, Skytop Road, Slocum Drive, Lambreth Lane, Winding Ridge Road	College Place, Manley Field House, Goldstein Student Center, Skyhall, Skytop Office Building: Syracuse University campus shuttle route. Operates only when classes are in session August - May. Students and staff ride free.; 344 - Select trips serve Skyhall both before and after serving the Skytop Office Building
44 Manley Field House	College Place	244: Goldstein Student Center	Comstock Avenue, Small Road, Skytop Road, Slocum Drive, Lambreth Lane, Winding Ridge Road	College Place, Manley Field House, Goldstein Student Center, Skyhall, Skytop Office Building: Syracuse University campus shuttle route. Operates only when classes are in session August - May. Students and staff ride free.; 344 - Select trips serve Skyhall both before and after serving the Skytop Office Building
44 Manley Field House	College Place	344: Skytop	Comstock Avenue, Small Road, Skytop Road, Slocum Drive, Lambreth Lane, Winding Ridge Road	College Place, Manley Field House, Goldstein Student Center, Skyhall, Skytop Office Building: Syracuse University campus shuttle route. Operates only when classes are in session August - May. Students and staff ride free.; 344 - Select trips serve Skyhall both before and after serving the Skytop Office Building
44 Manley Field House	College Place	444: Small Road & Lambreth Lane	Comstock Avenue, Small Road, Skytop Road, Slocum Drive, Lambreth Lane, Winding Ridge Road	College Place, Manley Field House, Goldstein Student Center, Skyhall, Skytop Office Building: Syracuse University campus shuttle route. Operates only when classes are in session August - May. Students and staff ride free.; 344 - Select trips serve Skyhall both before and after serving the Skytop Office Building
45 SU - Destiny USA	College Place	45: Destiny USA	Irving Avenue, Comstock Avenue, East Colvin Avenue, Jamesville Avenue, Brighton Avenue, Thurber Street	College Place, Destiny USA, Manley Field House, SU Physical Plant, Clarendon Heights, Hidden Valley, Remington Gardens: Syracuse University campus shuttle route. Operates only when classes are in session August - May. Students and staff ride free.; 45 - Operates Saturdays, late afternoon & early evenings only; 345 - Operates Weekdays, early & late mornings only
45 SU - Destiny USA	College Place	345: Thurber Street	Irving Avenue, Comstock Avenue, East Colvin Avenue, Jamesville Avenue, Brighton Avenue, Thurber Street	College Place, Destiny USA, Manley Field House, SU Physical Plant, Clarendon Heights, Hidden Valley, Remington Gardens: Syracuse University campus shuttle route. Operates only when classes are in session August - May. Students and staff ride free.; 45 - Operates Saturdays, late afternoon & early evenings only; 345 - Operates Weekdays, early & late mornings only
46 Liverpool - Rt. 57	Centro Transit HUB	46: Wegmans – Route 31	South State Street, Old Liverpool Road, Route 57, Soule Road, Route 31, Route 481	Upstate University Hospital, Syracuse University, Destiny USA, Liverpool, Great Northern Mall, Oswego, Fulton
46 Liverpool - Rt. 57	Centro Transit HUB	246/246X: Oswego	South State Street, Old Liverpool Road, Route 57, Soule Road, Route 31, Route 481	Upstate University Hospital, Syracuse University, Destiny USA, Liverpool, Great Northern Mall, Oswego, Fulton
46 Liverpool - Rt. 57	Fulton	346: Oswego	South State Street, Old Liverpool Road, Route 57, Soule Road, Route 31, Route 481	Upstate University Hospital, Syracuse University, Destiny USA, Liverpool, Great Northern Mall, Oswego, Fulton
48 Liverpool - Morgan Rd	Centro Transit HUB	48: Grampian Road	South State Street, Old Liverpool Road, John Glenn Boulevard, Route 57	Destiny USA, Liverpool, Bayberry, Wegmans Liverpool
48 Liverpool - Morgan Rd	Centro Transit HUB	148: Wegmans via Bayberry	South State Street, Old Liverpool Road, John Glenn Boulevard, Route 57	Destiny USA, Liverpool, Bayberry, Wegmans Liverpool
48 Liverpool - Morgan Rd	Centro Transit HUB	248: Wegmans via John Glenn Boulevard	South State Street, Old Liverpool Road, John Glenn Boulevard, Route 57	Destiny USA, Liverpool, Bayberry, Wegmans Liverpool
50 Destiny USA	Centro Transit HUB	50: Destiny USA via I-81	South State Street, I-81, Solar Street, Park Street	Franklin Square, Inner Harbor, Regional Transportation Center, Destiny USA
50 Destiny USA	Centro Transit HUB	550: Destiny USA via Solar Street	South State Street, I-81, Solar Street, Park Street	Franklin Square, Inner Harbor, Regional Transportation Center, Destiny USA
510 Tully - LaFayette	Centro Transit HUB	510: Tully Community Church Park-N-Ride	Adams Street, Harrison Street, I-81, Route 11	SUNY Upstate Hospital, Tully, LaFayette
52 Court St	Centro Transit HUB	52: Shop City	North Salina Street, Townsend Street, Butternut Street, Park Street, Grant Boulevard, Court Street, Molloy Road	Northside, Grant Middle School, Shop City, Henninger High School
52 Court St	Centro Transit HUB	152: Industrial Park	North Salina Street, Townsend Street, Butternut Street, Park Street, Grant Boulevard, Court Street, Molloy Road	Northside, Grant Middle School, Shop City, Henninger High School
54 Midland	Centro Transit HUB	54: Matson	South Salina Street, South Avenue, Midland Avenue, Ballantyne Road, Valley Drive, Seneca Turnpike	One Centro Center, Shop Rite, Meachem Field, Valley Vista Apartments, Bernadine Apartments, Valley Plaza
54 Midland	Centro Transit HUB	254: Valley Plaza	South Salina Street, South Avenue, Midland Avenue, Ballantyne Road, Valley Drive, Seneca Turnpike	One Centro Center, Shop Rite, Meachem Field, Valley Vista Apartments, Bernadine Apartments, Valley Plaza
58 Parkhill	Centro Transit HUB	58: Bishop Grimes High School	Washington Street, Burnet Avenue, Thompson Road	Midtown, Eastwood, Carrier Circle, East Syracuse
62 Fayetteville	Centro Transit HUB	62: Towne Center at Fayetteville	East Genesee Street, I-690, I-481, Widewaters Parkway, Route 92, Route 257	Widewaters Parkway, Dewitt Wegmans Park-N-Ride, SUNY Upstate Hospital, Towne Center at Fayetteville, Northeast Medical Center, Fayetteville, Manlius
62 Fayetteville	Centro Transit HUB	162: Manlius via I-690 & Widewaters Parkway	East Genesee Street, I-690, I-481, Widewaters Parkway, Route 92, Route 257	Widewaters Parkway, Dewitt Wegmans Park-N-Ride, SUNY Upstate Hospital, Towne Center at Fayetteville, Northeast Medical Center, Fayetteville, Manlius
62 Fayetteville	Centro Transit HUB	262: Manlius via East Genesee Street	East Genesee Street, I-690, I-481, Widewaters Parkway, Route 92, Route 257	Widewaters Parkway, Dewitt Wegmans Park-N-Ride, SUNY Upstate Hospital, Towne Center at Fayetteville, Northeast Medical Center, Fayetteville, Manlius
62 Fayetteville	Centro Transit HUB	262X: Manlius via I-481 & SUNY Upstate Hospital	East Genesee Street, I-690, I-481, Widewaters Parkway, Route 92, Route 257	Widewaters Parkway, Dewitt Wegmans Park-N-Ride, SUNY Upstate Hospital, Towne Center at Fayetteville, Northeast Medical Center, Fayetteville, Manlius
62 Fayetteville	Centro Transit HUB	362: Wegmans Dewitt Park-N-Ride via I-690 & Widewaters Parkway	East Genesee Street, I-690, I-481, Widewaters Parkway, Route 92, Route 257	Widewaters Parkway, Dewitt Wegmans Park-N-Ride, SUNY Upstate Hospital, Towne Center at Fayetteville, Northeast Medical Center, Fayetteville, Manlius
62 Fayetteville	Centro Transit HUB	462: Manlius via I-690 & I-481	East Genesee Street, I-690, I-481, Widewaters Parkway, Route 92, Route 257	Widewaters Parkway, Dewitt Wegmans Park-N-Ride, SUNY Upstate Hospital, Towne Center at Fayetteville, Northeast Medical Center, Fayetteville, Manlius
64 Western Lights	Centro Transit HUB	64: Western Lights via West Onondaga Street	Gifford Street, West Onondaga Street, Bellevue Avenue, Grand Avenue, Fay Road	Near Westside, Western Lights Plaza, Taunton, Bishop Ludden High School
64 Western Lights	Centro Transit HUB	164: Bellevue Avenue via Western Lights	Gifford Street, West Onondaga Street, Bellevue Avenue, Grand Avenue, Fay Road	Near Westside, Western Lights Plaza, Taunton, Bishop Ludden High School
64 Western Lights	Centro Transit HUB	264: St. Camillus via West Onondaga Street	Gifford Street, West Onondaga Street, Bellevue Avenue, Grand Avenue, Fay Road	Near Westside, Western Lights Plaza, Taunton, Bishop Ludden High School
64 Western Lights	Centro Transit HUB	364: Western Lights via Grand Avenue	Gifford Street, West Onondaga Street, Bellevue Avenue, Grand Avenue, Fay Road	Near Westside, Western Lights Plaza, Taunton, Bishop Ludden High School
64 Western Lights	Centro Transit HUB	464: St. Camillus via Grand Avenue	Gifford Street, West Onondaga Street, Bellevue Avenue, Grand Avenue, Fay Road	Near Westside, Western Lights Plaza, Taunton, Bishop Ludden High School
68 E. Fayette - Erie Blvd	Centro Transit HUB	68: Westmoreland Avenue	East Fayette Street, Erie Boulevard East, Bridge Street	Midtown, Rolling Green Estates, Erie Boulevard retail corridor, DeWitt, East Syracuse Walmart
68 E. Fayette - Erie Blvd	Centro Transit HUB	168: Widewaters Parkway	East Fayette Street, Erie Boulevard East, Bridge Street	Midtown, Rolling Green Estates, Erie Boulevard retail corridor, DeWitt, East Syracuse Walmart
72 Townsend - E. Colvin	Centro Transit HUB	72: Toomey Abbott Apartments	Oakwood Avenue, Garfield Avenue, East Colvin Street, Comstock Avenue	Pioneer Homes, Central Village, Almus Oliver Apartments, Manley Field House, Loretto & Iroquois Nursing Homes
72 Townsend - E. Colvin	Centro Transit HUB	172: Loretto Health & Rehab	Oakwood Avenue, Garfield Avenue, East Colvin Street, Comstock Avenue	Pioneer Homes, Central Village, Almus Oliver Apartments, Manley Field House, Loretto & Iroquois Nursing Homes
74 Solvay	Centro Transit HUB	74: Solvay via Milton Avenue	Gifford Street, Avery Avenue, Milton Avenue	Near Westside, PSLA @ Fowler High School, Solvay
74 Solvay	Centro Transit HUB	274: Solvay via Avery Avenue	Gifford Street, Avery Avenue, Milton Avenue	Near Westside, PSLA @ Fowler High School, Solvay
74 Solvay	Centro Transit HUB	374: Township 5	Gifford Street, Avery Avenue, Milton Avenue	Near Westside, PSLA @ Fowler High School, Solvay
76 Salt Springs	Centro Transit HUB	76: Le Moyne College	East Genesee Street, Salt Springs Road, Bridge Street	Midtown, Eastside, Le Moyne College, DeWitt
76 Salt Springs	Centro Transit HUB	176: Widewaters Parkway	East Genesee Street, Salt Springs Road, Bridge Street	Midtown, Eastside, Le Moyne College, DeWitt
80 Grant Blvd	Centro Transit HUB	80: Shop City	James Street, Butternut Street, Grant Boulevard	Northside, Eastwood, Shop City, Grant Village Apartments, Eastwood Homes
80 Grant Blvd	Centro Transit HUB	180: Taft & Dunlap Avenues	James Street, Butternut Street, Grant Boulevard	Northside, Eastwood, Shop City, Grant Village Apartments, Eastwood Homes
82 Baldwinsville	Centro Transit HUB	82: Baldwinsville – Spruce Street	State Fair Boulevard, I-690, Downer Street	Baldwinsville, Fairgrounds, Destiny USA.: 682 - Regular service operates Saturday & Sunday only, Memorial Day – Labor Day. Special event service operates for events at the Lakeview Amphitheater. During the New York State Fair, service is replaced by various Park-N-Ride shuttles.
82 Baldwinsville	Centro Transit HUB	182: Baldwinsville – Mott Road via Indian Springs	State Fair Boulevard, I-690, Downer Street	Baldwinsville, Fairgrounds, Destiny USA.: 682 - Regular service operates Saturday & Sunday only, Memorial Day – Labor Day. Special event service operates for events at the Lakeview Amphitheater. During the New York State Fair, service is replaced by various Park-N-Ride shuttles.
82 Baldwinsville	Centro Transit HUB	682: Lakeview Park/Fairgrounds	State Fair Boulevard, I-690, Downer Street	Baldwinsville, Fairgrounds, Destiny USA.: 682 - Regular service operates Saturday & Sunday only, Memorial Day – Labor Day. Special event service operates for events at the Lakeview Amphitheater. During the New York State Fair, service is replaced by various Park-N-Ride shuttles.
84 Mattydale	Centro Transit HUB	84: Brewerton Road	Brewerton Road, Molloy Road, Allen Road, Chestnut Street	Northside, Mattydale, Northern Lights Plaza, North Syracuse
84 Mattydale	Centro Transit HUB	184 Allen Road	Brewerton Road, Molloy Road, Allen Road, Chestnut Street	Northside, Mattydale, Northern Lights Plaza, North Syracuse
86 Henry Clay Blvd	Centro Transit HUB	186: Wetzel Road via YMCA	South State Street, I-81, Buckley Road, Taft Road, Henry Clay Boulevard, Wetzel Road	Salina, North Medical Center, Liverpool
86 Henry Clay Blvd	Centro Transit HUB	286 Wetzel Road	South State Street, I-81, Buckley Road, Taft Road, Henry Clay Boulevard, Wetzel Road	Salina, North Medical Center, Liverpool
88 North Syracuse	Centro Transit HUB	88: Cicero Wegmans Park-N-Ride	South State Street, I-81, Brewerton Road	Syracuse University, SUNY Upstate, Destiny USA, Airport Plaza Park-N-Ride, Cicero Wegmans Park-N-Ride, North Syracuse, Cicero, Central Square: All 88, 188, 288, and 388 trips operate express between Downtown Syracuse and Northern Lights Plaza; Select trips operate to Destiny USA; 288 – Operates express between North Syracuse and Central Square; 388X – Operates express between Downtown Syracuse and Central Square
88 North Syracuse	Centro Transit HUB	188: Cicero Commons	South State Street, I-81, Brewerton Road	Syracuse University, SUNY Upstate, Destiny USA, Airport Plaza Park-N-Ride, Cicero Wegmans Park-N-Ride, North Syracuse, Cicero, Central Square: All 88, 188, 288, and 388 trips operate express between Downtown Syracuse and Northern Lights Plaza; Select trips operate to Destiny USA; 288 – Operates express between North Syracuse and Central Square; 388X – Operates express between Downtown Syracuse and Central Square
88 North Syracuse	Centro Transit HUB	288: Central Square via North Syracuse	South State Street, I-81, Brewerton Road	Syracuse University, SUNY Upstate, Destiny USA, Airport Plaza Park-N-Ride, Cicero Wegmans Park-N-Ride, North Syracuse, Cicero, Central Square: All 88, 188, 288, and 388 trips operate express between Downtown Syracuse and Northern Lights Plaza; Select trips operate to Destiny USA; 288 – Operates express between North Syracuse and Central Square; 388X – Operates express between Downtown Syracuse and Central Square
88 North Syracuse	Centro Transit HUB	388: Central Square via Cicero & North Syracuse	South State Street, I-81, Brewerton Road	Syracuse University, SUNY Upstate, Destiny USA, Airport Plaza Park-N-Ride, Cicero Wegmans Park-N-Ride, North Syracuse, Cicero, Central Square: All 88, 188, 288, and 388 trips operate express between Downtown Syracuse and Northern Lights Plaza; Select trips operate to Destiny USA; 288 – Operates express between North Syracuse and Central Square; 388X – Operates express between Downtown Syracuse and Central Square
88 North Syracuse	Centro Transit HUB	388X: Central Square Express	South State Street, I-81, Brewerton Road	Syracuse University, SUNY Upstate, Destiny USA, Airport Plaza Park-N-Ride, Cicero Wegmans Park-N-Ride, North Syracuse, Cicero, Central Square: All 88, 188, 288, and 388 trips operate express between Downtown Syracuse and Northern Lights Plaza; Select trips operate to Destiny USA; 288 – Operates express between North Syracuse and Central Square; 388X – Operates express between Downtown Syracuse and Central Square
90 Wegmans Shopper	Wegmans	Various	James Street, West Onondaga Street, Brewerton Road, East Genesee Street	Direct service from various Nursing & Senior Living Facilities to Wegmans store locations in Eastwood, Cicero, Western Lights, and DeWitt
92 TOPS Shopper	TOPS	Various	Grant Boulevard, Brewerton Road, East Genesee Street, Nottingham Road	Direct service from various Nursing & Senior Living Facilities to TOPS store locations in North Syracuse, Shop City, Fayetteville, Meadowbrook
94 J Lot Shuttle	J Lot	94: VA Medical Center	Cortland Avenue, Adams Street, Irving Ave	Parking lot shuttle for Syracuse VA Medical Center employees
Community Extra	CBA, Bishop Grimes, Bishop Ludden, Corcoran HS, PSLA @ Fowler HS, Henninger HS, ITC HS, Nottingham HS, OnTECH Charter HS, Syracuse Academy of Science Charter HS	Various	North Salina Street, Court Street, Park Street, Butternut Street, Grant Boulevard, Lodi Street, James Street, Burnet Avenue, Teall Avenue, Midler Avenue, East Genesee Street, Salt Springs Road, Euclid Avenue, Meadowbrook Drive, East Colvin Street, Jamesville Avenue, Townsend Avenue, South Salina Street, Brighton Avenue, Midland Avenue, Ballantyne Road, Valley Drive, South Avenue, Bellevue Avenue, West Onondaga Street, Grace Street, Gifford Street, Grand Avenue, Winkworth Parkway, Avery Avenue, Milton Avenue, West Genesee Street	Direct service provided to all public, charter, and parochial high schools attended by students who reside within the Syracuse City School District.; Routes deviate greatly from regular bus routes to better serve neighborhoods and schools.; Routes have a four digit number - the first two digits identify the school served; by using the number of the regular route that serves the school, and the last two digits identify the general area served; by using the number of the regular route for that area. For example, route "2610 Glenwood - S. Salina St" serves Corcoran High School (route #26) and provides extra service to the S. Salina St. area (route #10).

== See also ==
- Syracuse metropolitan area
