= Central New York Regional Transportation Authority =

Public transportation organization in Central New York

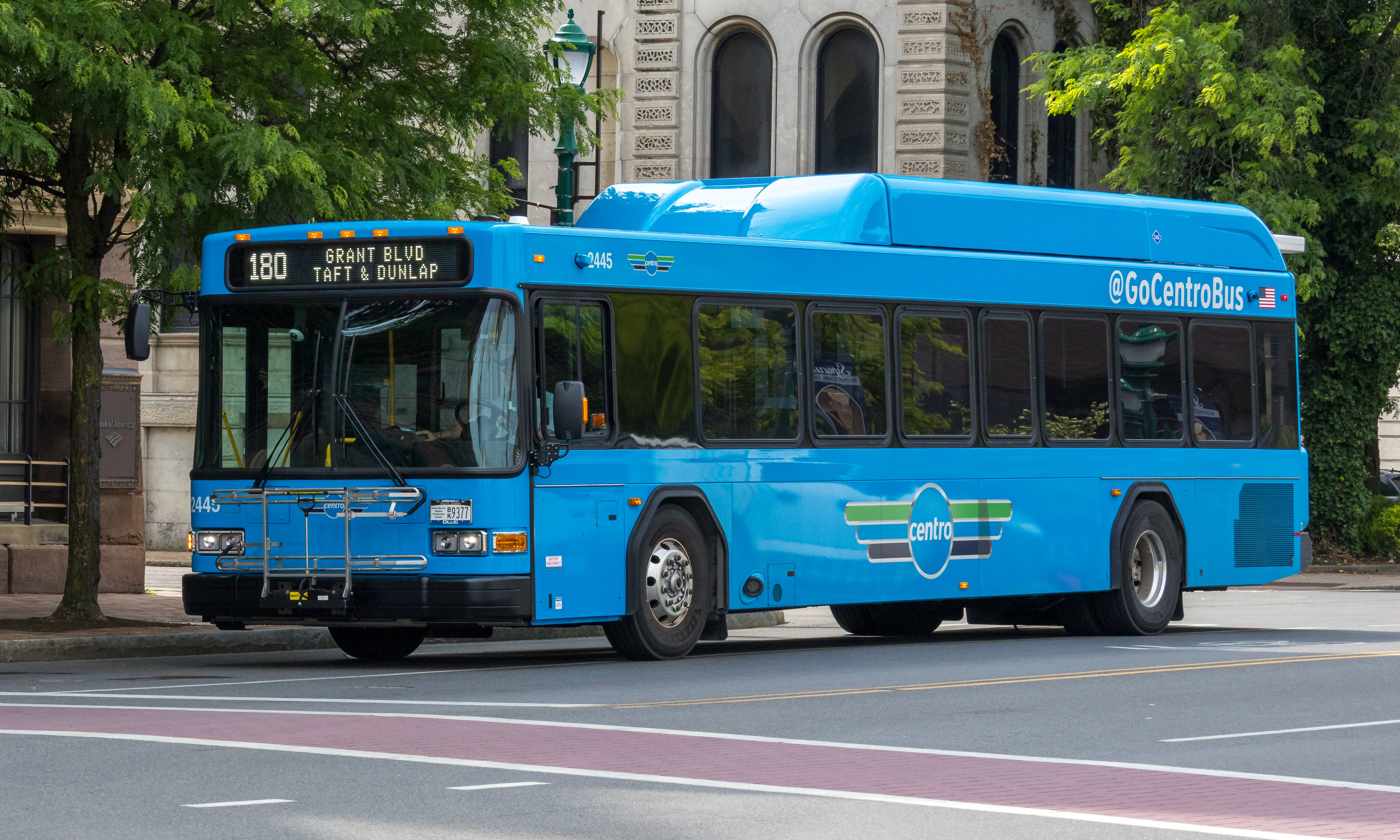
- A Centro bus in downtown Syracuse
- Founded: 1970
- Headquarters: 200 Cortland Avenue, Syracuse, NY, 13205-0820
- Locale: Syracuse and surrounding areas
- Service type: Bus transit
- Fleet: 238
- Daily ridership: Approximately 42,000 (weekdays)
- Fuel type: Diesel, CNG, Diesel-electric hybrid
- Chief executive: Christopher Tuff
- Website: centro.org

The Central New York Regional Transportation Authority (CNYRTA), commonly referred to as Centro, is an American New York State public benefit corporation and the operator of mass transit in Onondaga, Oswego, Cayuga, Oneida, and Cortland counties in New York state. The CNYRTA was formed on August 1, 1970, along with similar agencies in Rochester, Albany, and Buffalo.

Centro won the American Public Transportation Association's 2006 "Outstanding Public Transportation System Achievement Award" for bus companies serving 4 million to 30 million riders a year.

== Organization ==
Centro has a 9-member board of directors, including one non-voting member. Its CEO is Christopher Tuff. In 2017, Centro had operating expenses of $93.34 million, no outstanding debt, and a level of staffing of 738 people.

== Subsidiaries ==
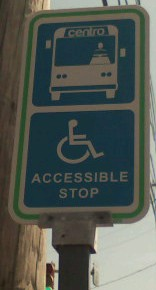
A typical Centro bus stop sign

The Central New York Regional Transportation Authority is authorized by the State of New York to operate transit services in Cayuga, Cortland, Jefferson, Madison, Oneida, Onondaga, and Oswego counties. The below subsidiaries operate transit services in the counties that have opted-in to the transportation district.

=== CNY Centro ===
The biggest service subsidiary, CNY Centro, operates service in the city of Syracuse and suburban Onondaga County. Centro took over the assets and operations of the Syracuse Transit Corporation on January 17, 1972, and those of the suburban Syracuse & Eastern Transit Corp. in 1974. CNY Centro staff provide support and administrative functions; including marketing, procurement, route planning, human resources, training and safety for all sister subsidiaries.

Local, express, and commuter routes connect the area with Downtown Syracuse and Syracuse University.

=== Centro of Oswego ===
Routes are based in the City of Oswego. Service began on August 28, 1972. Centro assumed operation of the Oswego-Fulton-Syracuse intercity bus service from S&O Coach on June 21, 1993.

Routes generally travel east and west through the city, with connections to routes that travel to Fulton and Syracuse made in Downtown Oswego. Centro operates two student shuttle routes on the SUNY Oswego campus.

The neighboring communities of Fulton and Mexico are also provided with fixed route service.

=== Centro of Cayuga ===
Routes are based in the City of Auburn. Service began on April 2, 1973. Centro assumed operation of Auburn-Syracuse intercity bus service from Onondaga Coach on August 30, 1993.

Local bus routes are interlined in a continuous loop that makes a one-seat ride throughout the entire system and city possible.

=== Centro of Oneida ===
Centro of Oneida began operation on April 1, 2005 with the acquisition of the financially troubled Utica Transit Authority based in Utica. The UTA was a local agency that did not have the same ability to raise revenues as a public benefit corporation such as the CNYRTA. Merging the local county bus operations into the Centro system brought greater financial stability through savings in personnel and administrative costs. On October 1, 2005, Centro of Oneida assumed the operations of the VIP Transportation bus system in Rome. This merger of services has allowed for improved transit for citizens of Oneida County.

Even though, Oneida County public transit operations have been consolidated into one system, routes do not connect the cities of Rome and Utica. They also do not connect those cities to Onondaga, Cayuga, and Oswego Counties. Service between Utica, Rome and Syracuse is provided by the Krapf Group.

=== Call-A-Bus ===
Centro's Call-A-Bus service provides paratransit service under the criteria set forth under the ADA. Members of the riding public, with disabilities that makes travel by transit buses difficult, are able to request pre-planned travel through the Call-A-Bus program. Service is offered in all areas that have regular route service.

=== Centro Parking, Inc. ===
Centro Parking, Inc. is a subsidiary that leases land from the State of New York in Downtown Syracuse to sell monthly parking. Centro Parking, Inc., has in the past, offered management of parking garages for local institutions like SUNY Upstate. Revenue that is generated from the parking lots contributes to the operational budget for transit services.

== Bus routes ==
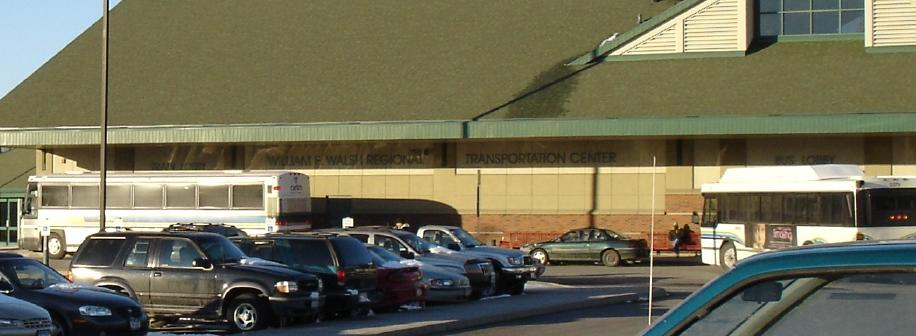
A coach for long-distance routes and a typical Centro city bus at the William F. Walsh Regional Transportation Center, in Syracuse.

Centro operates thirty-six bus routes in Syracuse, eight bus routes in Oswego County, seven bus routes in Auburn, six bus routes in Rome, and eleven bus routes in Utica. In 2018, Centro had a ridership of 10.3 million trips, down from a 2008 high of 12.1 million trips.

In Syracuse and Utica, bus routes are numbered with a two digit base number. Short turn and variations of the base route are prefixed with an additional number to denote a different travel pattern. Bus routes in Oswego and Fulton use an alpha-numeric numbering scheme that suffixes the base route with a letter to denote a different travel pattern.

In each service area, routes operate in a spoke-hub model; focused on the downtown areas of cities served with routes extending to outlying neighborhoods and communities. This focus on downtown areas is the origin for the common name of Centro; the Spanish word for downtown. Buses arrive at the various hubs at fixed times throughout the day to allow for streamlined transfers. CNY Centro and Centro of Oswego operate campus shuttle routes for Syracuse University and SUNY Oswego, respectively.

CNY Centro operates various Community Extra routes, open to the public, that directly serve public, charter, and parochial high schools attended by students who reside within the Syracuse City School District. High school students, that live 1.5 or more miles from their school, are provided with free travel to and from school on school days.

Special event service is operated by CNY Centro for sporting events at the Carrier Dome and Lakeview Amphitheater concerts. CNY Centro, Centro of Cayuga, and Centro of Oswego all operate extensive shuttle service to and from the New York State Fair. In recent years, with increased attendance at the State Fair, other Upstate New York transit agencies have provided buses and drivers to meet demand for parking lot shuttles.

Several Park-N-Rides are located throughout suburban Onondaga County that are served by CNY Centro bus routes.

Cortland County service started on March 31, 2025. This added seven routes into the network.

=== The Tables below show lists of Centro routes per operating area ===
Cayuga County.

Route	Terminals			Major streets served	Notes
Aub 1	Downtown Auburn Dill St/North St	↔	Auburn Fingerlakes Mall	W Genesee St Road, NYS Route 326	Directly Serves Cayuga County Offices, Auburn Towne Plaza, TOPS.; Select weekday trips serve Cayuga County Unity House via Wright Av.; Interlines to Route 2 in downtown and Route 4 at the mall on Weekdays.; Interlines to Route 3 on Saturdays.; No Sunday Service.
Aub 2	Downtown Auburn Dill St/North St	↔	Auburn Walmart Supercenter	Franklin Street, Steward Avenue	Directly Serves Cayuga Community College, Auburn Plaza.; Interlines to Route 3 at Walmart and Route 1 in downtown on Weekdays.; Interlines to Route 4 on Saturdays.; No Sunday Service.
Aub 3	Downtown Auburn Dill St/North St	↔	Auburn Walmart Supercenter	North Street, McIntosh Dr	Directly Serves Auburn Community Hospital.; Interlines to Route 2 at Walmart and Route 4 at Walmart on Weekdays.; Interlines to Route 1 on Saturdays.; No Sunday Service.
Aub 4	Downtown Auburn Dill St/North St	↔	Auburn Fingerlakes Mall	State Street, Clark Street, Division Street (select trips only)	Directly Serves Brogan Manor.; Select trips serve Auburn Technology Park and BOCES during Morning and Afternoon peak periods.; AM School Trippers to Casey Park.; Interlines to Route 1 at the mall and Route 3 in downtown on Weekdays.; Interlines to Route 2 on Saturdays.; No Sunday Service.
Aub 6	Auburn Northbrook Heights	↔	Auburn Wegmans		Tuesday Only Shopper bus from Northbrook Heights Senior Center to Wegmans.; Does not make intermediate stops.
Aub 38	Downtown Auburn Dill St/North St	↔	Syracuse Centro Transit Hub (Route 138)	W Genesee St Road (US 20), Old Seneca Tpke, Howlett Hill Road (NY 175)	Commuter Bus fare from Syracuse to Auburn only; Regular Fares from Skaneateles to/from Syracuse/Auburn; Route 138 Weekdays only to Syracuse Centro Hub and Syracuse University; Limited Route 238 Weekends only service to Camillus; Select 138 trips serve Auburn Correctional Facility and Auburn Towne Center
Aub 38	Downtown Auburn Dill St/North St	↔	Camillus Township 5 (Route 238)	W Genesee St Road (US 20), Old Seneca Tpke, Howlett Hill Road (NY 175)	Commuter Bus fare from Syracuse to Auburn only; Regular Fares from Skaneateles to/from Syracuse/Auburn; Route 138 Weekdays only to Syracuse Centro Hub and Syracuse University; Limited Route 238 Weekends only service to Camillus; Select 138 trips serve Auburn Correctional Facility and Auburn Towne Center

Oneida County. There is no Sunday Service in Oneida County.

Route	Terminals			Major streets served	Notes
Rome 2	Rome Centro Transit Hub Liberty St and Washington St	↔	Rome Walmart Supercenter	Liberty Street, Erie Blvd (NY 69)	Interlines to Route 5 at the Hub.
Rome 5	Rome Centro Transit Hub Liberty St and Washington St	↔	Rome Black River Blvd	James Street, Black River Blvd	Downtown loop surrounding Freedom Plaza.; Interlines to Route 6 at the Hub.
Rome 6	Rome Centro Transit Hub Liberty St and Washington St	↔	Griffis Innovation Park	Floyd Avenue, Hill Road	Directly serves MVCC Rome, Rome VA Hospital, Rome Free Academy, Griffis International Airport.; Interlines to Route 2 at the Hub.
Ut 11	Utica Centro Transit Hub	↔	Whitesboro Main Street	Whitesboro Street, Main Street	Directly Serves Adirondack Bank Center and Utica University Nexus Center.; Half-Hour Intervals with Route 111 between Hub and Mathews Av.
Ut 12	Utica Centro Transit Hub	↔	Utica Human Technologies Corporation	Bleecker Street	Select trips serve Utica Union Station with Amtrak, Adirondack RR, and intercity bus connections.
Ut 14	Utica Centro Transit Hub	↔	New Hartford Consumer Square	Mohawk Street, James Street, Burrstone Road	Limited Morning and Afternoon service; Service mainly provided weekday evenings and nights only.; Directly serves MVCC, Utica University, Lenox Business Park.; No Saturday service.; Interlines with Route 111 at the Hub
Ut 15	Utica Centro Transit Hub	↔	Mohawk Valley Community College Utica Campus	James Street, Elm Street	
Ut 20	Utica Centro Transit Hub	↔	Lenox Business Park	Lenox Avenue, York Street, Burrstone Road	Directly Serves Utica University.; Interlines with Route 22 at the Hub.
Ut 22	Utica Centro Transit Hub	↺	Utica Armory Drive	Outbound: South Street; Inbound: Eagle Street; Loop: Ontario Street	One Way Loop.; Interlines with Route 20 at the Hub.
Ut 24	Utica Centro Transit Hub	↔	The Orchard New Hartford Town Hall (Route 124)	All: Genesee Street; 224: Oxford Road	Route 124 Weekdays and Saturdays from the Hub to The Orchard. Interlines to Route 29 at the Hub; Route 224 Hourly from the Hub to Sangertown Mall via Washington Mills weekdays only Outbound only); Route 24 one outbound AM Trip to Sangertown Mall; Routes 124 and 224 Half Hourly Service on Genesee Street Weekdays Only; Route 124 Weekday evenings and night service.; 124 Directly Serves New Hartford Shopping Center and Sangertown Square Mall
Ut 24	Utica Centro Transit Hub	↔	New Hartford Sangertown Square Mall (Route 24, 224)	All: Genesee Street; 224: Oxford Road	Route 124 Weekdays and Saturdays from the Hub to The Orchard. Interlines to Route 29 at the Hub; Route 224 Hourly from the Hub to Sangertown Mall via Washington Mills weekdays only Outbound only); Route 24 one outbound AM Trip to Sangertown Mall; Routes 124 and 224 Half Hourly Service on Genesee Street Weekdays Only; Route 124 Weekday evenings and night service.; 124 Directly Serves New Hartford Shopping Center and Sangertown Square Mall
Ut 28	Utica Centro Transit Hub	↔	North Utica Herkimer Road	Genesee Street, Herkimer Road (NY 5)	Outbound buses serve Riverside Center Walmart before heading east on Herkimer Road; Inbound buses serve the Centro Garage; Directly serves North Utica Shopping Center; Interlines with Route 224 at the Hub
Ut 29	Utica Centro Transit Hub	↔	SUNY Polytechnic Institute	All: Riverside Drive; 29, 229: Genesee Street; 129: Leland Av, Auert Av	Early AM service between the Hub and Riverside Center only via Genesee Street as Route 29.; Route 129 between Hub and SUNY Poly via Leland Avenue.; Route 229 between Hub and SUNY Poly via Genesee Street, Weeknights only.; All routes directly serve Riverside Center; Route 129 directly serves Centro Garage and North Utica Shopping Center; Interlines with Route 124 at the Hub
Ut 30	Utica Centro Transit Hub	↔	Clinton	Genesee Street, Scene Tpke, NYS Route 12B	Directly Serves New Hartford Shopping Center, Sangertown Square Mall, Hamilton College.
Ut 31	Utica Centro Transit Hub	↔	Chadwicks	Oneida Street	Route 131 between Hub and Chadwicks.; Route 31 select morning trips between the Hub and Higby Road.; No early-afternoon service.; Weekdays only
Ut 33	Utica Centro Transit Hub	↔	Verona Turning Stone Resort Casino	Old River Road, Floyd Avenue, NYS Route 365	Utica-Rome Commuter Bus, special $3 fare; 6 Trips a day, Mon-Sat.; Directly Serves Marcy Correctional Facility, Walmart Distribution Center, MVCC Rome.; Rome bus connections at the Rome Centro Transit Hub.
Ut 111	Utica Centro Transit Hub	↔	New Hartford Sangertown Square Mall	Whitesboro Street, Main Street (New York Mills), Commercial Drive (NY 5A)	Half-Hour Intervals with Route 11 Between Hub and Mathews Avenue.; Directly Serves New Hartford Consumer Square, The Orchard, New Hartford Hannaford and At-Home (Outbound trips only).; Select trips serve Country Club Court and BOCES; Interlines with Route 14 at the Hub during evenings and weeknights.

Oswego County - New Routes Effective January 26th 2026. (This table is a work of progress, check back later for updates)

Route	Terminals			Major streets served	Notes
Osw 9	Oswego Pontiac Terrace Apartments	↔	Oswego Price Chopper		Senior Shopper Bus, bi-weekly on Wednesdays only.; Makes no intermediate stops.; No Changes with Centro Better Bus Redesign
Osw 9	Fulton Minetto Senior Housing	↔	Oswego Price Chopper		Senior Shopper Bus, bi-weekly on Wednesdays only.; Makes no intermediate stops.; No Changes with Centro Better Bus Redesign
Osw 10	SUNY Oswego Marano Campus Center	↔	SUNY Oswego The Village		No Weekend Service; No Service during academic breaks at SUNY Oswego; No Changes with Centro Better Bus Redesign
Osw 11	SUNY Oswego Marano Campus Center	↔	SUNY Oswego Rice Creek Field Station		No Weekend Service; No Service during academic breaks at SUNY Oswego; Midday Service Only; No Changes with Centro Better Bus Redesign
Fulton 14	Fulton Towpath Towers	↔	Fulton Medical Center		Replaced routes Fulton 4A and 4B in Centro Better Bus Redesign; No Sunday Service
Fulton 15	Fulton Walmart Supercenter	↔	Fulton Towpath Towers		Replaced routes Fulton 5A and 5B in Centro Better Bus Redesign; No Sunday Service
Mex 16	Downtown Oswego East 3rd Street/Cayuga Street	↔	Fulton Towpath Towers		Renumbered from Mex 3 with Centro's Better Bus Redesign
Osw 17	SUNY Oswego Marano Campus Center	↔	Oswego Walmart Supercenter		Replaced routes Osw 1A and 2A in the Centro Better Bus Redesign; Limited Sunday Service
Osw 18	SUNY Oswego Marano Campus Center	↔	Downtown Oswego East 3rd Street/Cayuga Street		Replaced routes Osw 2C, and 2D in the Centro Better Bus Redesign; No Sunday Service
Osw 19	Downtown Oswego East 3rd Street/Cayuga Street	↔	Oswego Walmart Supercenter		Replaced routes Osw 1B, 1C, and 1D in the Centro Better Bus Redesign; No Sunday Service
Osw 46	SUNY Oswego Marano Campus Center (Limited Service)	↔	Syracuse Centro Transit Hub (Route 246)		
Osw 46	Downtown Oswego East 3rd Street/Cayuga Street	↔	Syracuse Centro Transit Hub (Route 246)		
Osw 46	Downtown Oswego East 3rd Street/Cayuga Street	↔	Fulton Walmart Supercenter (Route 346)		
Sy 88	Central Square US Route 11/Hungry Lane Road	↔	Syracuse Centro Transit Hub		One Round trip per weekday peak period only.; No Weekend Service.; Commuter Service as Routes 288 and 388.

== Fares and Passes ==
Since 2024, Centro has simplified its regional fare structure, with now having one standardized fare across all of its operating areas. Centro no longer issues transfers to connect to other buses. Centro fares are as follows:

Fare Type	Cost	Notes
One Way	$1	Single Ride on a regular Centro Route.
One Way Commuter	$3	Single Ride on a Commuter route.
Day Pass	$4	Unlimited rides on regular routes in a 24h period.
Day Pass Commuter	$7	Unlimited rides on all Centro routes in a 24h period.
MAX Pass	$12	Weekly Unlimited for regular Centro routes.
MAX Pass Commuter	$30	Weekly Unlimited for all Centro routes.
10-trip	$10	10 Ride pass for regular routes, no expiration.
10-trip Commuter	$30	10 Ride pass for commuter routes, no expiration.

The following routes are Commuter Routes:

Syracuse: 288, 388, and 510 Utica/Rome: 33 Auburn: 38 Oswego: 46/246

Reduced fares for Seniors and persons with disabilities are 50% off all fare types.

Fares and passes can be purchased with cash and coins on board the bus. Tap to pay can only be used for one-way fares. Ride passes can also be purchased online, the Centro app, or through a vending machine in the Syracuse and Utica Hubs.

== Facilities ==
=== Syracuse Centro Transit Hub ===
The Centro Transit Hub in Syracuse, located at 599 S. Salina St, replaced the original Common Center transfer location at the intersection of S. Salina and E. Fayette Streets.

The old Common Center utilized the four corners of the intersection to "line up" buses, leaving passengers unprotected from inclement weather and with limited seating. Centro riders often had to cross the busy intersection twice to reach their next bus. The congestion caused by having dozens of full-sized buses and hundreds of people transferring buses at regular intervals throughout the day had been blamed for the lack of development in the 300 block of South Salina St.

Centro chose the current site of the Hub in 2006 and plans were approved by the Federal Transit Administration in November 2008. The design team included Centro, QPK Design, Parsons Brinckerhoff, Robson Woese Inc., and Fisher Associates. Construction began in 2011 and the facility opened on September 4, 2012. The facility offers twenty-two covered bus bays, covered outdoor seating, and an indoor lobby with seating, public restrooms, information booth and ticket vending machines.

=== William F. Walsh Regional Transportation Center ===
The William F. Walsh Regional Transportation Center is the long-distance ground travel (rail and bus) terminal serving the Syracuse area, located at 1 Walsh Circle. The RTC is operated by Centro subsidiary Intermodal Transportation Center, Inc. The transportation center is served by many local bus routes and provides connections to Amtrak, Greyhound, Megabus and Trailways of New York.

=== Utica Centro Transit Hub ===
The Centro Transit Hub in Utica, located at 15 Elizabeth St, replaced the original Busy Corner transfer location located at the intersection of Genesee, Bleecker and Lafayette Streets.

The transfer point was moved one block east to Charlotte Street between Bleecker and Elizabeth Streets. This portion of Charlotte Street was closed and converted to a center island platform with nine bus bays and seating. A lobby with an enclosed waiting area, information booth, ticket vending machines and public restrooms was also constructed. The facility opened for service on February 4, 2013.

=== Rome Centro Transit Hub ===
The Centro Transit Hub in Rome, located at 207 W Liberty St, replaced the original transfer location located at the Liberty-George parking garage. It is owned by the city of Rome and leased to Centro of Oneida. The Liberty-George parking structure was deemed structurally unsound and demolished in 2019, with Centro pre-emptively moving to a temporary location in 2018. The new, permanent facility offers an enclosed waiting area and information booth and opened on November 2, 2020.

== Active bus fleet ==
Year	Manufacturer	Model	Engine	Transmission	Fleet numbers	Notes	Depot Assignments
2015	MCI	D4000CT	Cummins ISL9	Allison B500	690-696		Auburn, Oswego
2016	Gillig	Low Floor CNG 40'	Cummins Westport ISL-G	Voith D864.5	1625-1631		Syracuse Garage
2017	Gillig	Low Floor 29'	Cummins L9	Voith D864.6	1700-1709		1700-1704 Oswego Garage, 1705-1708 Auburn Garage, 1709 Syracuse Garage
2017	Gillig	Low Floor CNG 40'	Cummins Westport ISL-G NZ	Voith D864.6	1750-1781		Syracuse Garage
2018	Gillig	Low Floor 40'	Cummins L9	Voith D864.6	1800-1809		1800 Oswego, 1801 Utica Garage. 1802-1804, 1809 Syracuse Garage. 1805-1808 Auburn Garage
2019	Gillig	Low Floor CNG 40'	Cummins Westport L9N	Voith D864.6	1900-1913		Syracuse Garage
2019	Gillig	Low Floor 35'	Cummins L9	Voith D864.6	1920, 1921		Utica Garage
2020	Gillig	Low Floor CNG 40'	Cummins Westport L9N	Voith D864.6	2020-2022		Syracuse Garage
2021	Gillig	Low Floor 29'	Cummins L9	Voith D864.6	2100-2102		Rome Garage
2022	Gillig	Low Floor 40'	Cummins L9	Voith D864.6	2210-2217		2210-2215 Oswego Garage. 2216, 2217 Auburn Garage
2022	Gillig	Low Floor 35'	Cummins L9	Voith D864.6	2220-2223		Utica Garage
2022	Gillig	Low Floor CNG 40'	Cummins Westport L9N	Voith D864.6	2230-2247		Syracuse Garage
2022	Gillig	Low Floor Suburban 40'	Cummins L9	Voith D864.6	2250-2254		Syracuse Garage
2023	Gillig	Low Floor 29'	Cummins L9	Voith D867.8	2410-2422		Rome, Utica
2024	Gillig	Low Floor 35'	Cummins L9	Voith D867.8 NXT	2423-2429		Rome, Utica
2025	Gillig	Low Floor CNG 40'	Cummins Westport L9N	Voith D867.8 NXT	2430-2493		Syracuse Garage

== See also ==
- Capital District Transportation Authority - Capital District, New York
- Metropolitan Transportation Authority - New York Metropolitan Area
- New York State Thruway Authority
- Niagara Frontier Transportation Authority - Buffalo, New York
- Rochester-Genesee Regional Transportation Authority - Rochester, New York
- List of bus routes in Onondaga County, New York
- Port of Oswego Authority
