= Bernie Fine =

American basketball coach

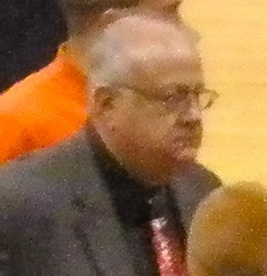
- Fine in 2010

Biographical details
- Born: December 23, 1945 (age 80); Brooklyn, New York
- Education: Syracuse (1967)

Coaching career (HC unless noted)
- 1970–1971: Lincoln Junior HS
- 1971–1976: Henninger HS (junior varsity)
- 1976–2011: Syracuse (associate HC)

Bernard Arthur Fine (born December 23, 1945) is a former associate head basketball coach for the Syracuse Orange men's basketball team and founding member of the Jewish Coaches Association.

In 2011, Fine was fired after being accused of sexual abuse of 2 former Syracuse ballboys, both of whom were stepbrothers, while according to other reports at the time, Fine had also allegedly molested two other boys in the years following the first two reports.

== Early coaching career ==
Fine started his coaching career as a student-manager in 1963, when Syracuse head coach Jim Boeheim played at SU with NBA Hall-of-Famer Dave Bing. Fine graduated from Syracuse University in 1967 with a B.S. in personnel and industrial relations, and went into business.

In 1970, he assumed the basketball and football coaching positions at Lincoln Junior High School. The following year, he went to Henninger High School in Syracuse, New York, as the junior varsity basketball coach from 1971 to 1974, before taking over as varsity coach. When Boeheim became head coach at Syracuse University in 1976, he hired Fine and Rick Pitino as assistants.

== College coaching career ==
During his coaching career, Fine was named the president of the Central New York Kidney Foundation; a faculty adviser for a social fraternity, Sigma Alpha Mu; an adviser for an honor society, Phi Kappa Alpha; and has been involved with the Boys Club and the Make-a-Wish Foundation.

Fine was responsible for coaching Syracuse's forwards and centers, including Rony Seikaly, Etan Thomas and John Wallace. In 2000, Fine was promoted to associate head coach. In the 2001–02 season, he assumed head coaching responsibilities for three games when Boeheim had health problems.

Fine also coached U.S. Maccabiah team to a silver medal at the 1993 World Maccabiah Games in Israel. In 2002, he participated in The Blackfeet Native Skill-Builder Hoop Clinic, a basketball seminar conducted on the Blackfeet Indian Reservation in Montana.

At the time of Fine's dismissal from Syracuse in 2011, after a 36-year career he led all active Division I assistant coaches in tenure at their schools.

== Sexual abuse allegations and termination ==
Two step-brothers and two others alleged that Fine had molested them years earlier. The two others later recanted and admitted that they had fabricated their stories. In 2012, after an investigation federal prosecutors announced Fine would not be charged.

In November 2011 two step-brothers who were former Syracuse University ball boys alleged on ESPN's Outside the Lines program that they had been molested by Fine from the late 1970s to the 1990s. Fine and head men's basketball coach Boeheim denied the charges. Because the incidents occurred over 10 years prior, District Attorney William Fitzpatrick indicated that the statute of limitations would probably bar any prosecution. Syracuse University placed Fine on administrative leave and said it would cooperate fully with the investigation.

Subsequently, a third and then a fourth person claimed to have been molested by Fine in 2002 in Pittsburgh, Pennsylvania. The United States Secret Service searched Fine's house and seized file cabinets, computers, and other potential evidence. The investigation included more than 150 interviews with 130 witnesses, and a review of more than 100,000 pages of documents that included emails, travel records, financial records, computer records, and phone records.

On November 27, 2011, Syracuse University Chancellor Nancy Cantor fired Fine in response to the allegations. Cantor said she made her decision after ESPN released a tape of a 2002 phone conversation between one of the former ballboys, Bobby Davis, and Fine's wife Laurie. In the tape, Laurie claimed she knew about her husband's behavior, but felt powerless to stop it. In response to a USA Today editorial calling for an explanation for why it kept Fine on the job in 2005, Cantor said that had Syracuse known about the tape at any point prior to November 27, Fine would have been fired on the spot.

On April 13, 2012, one of Fine's accusers said he "fabricated everything" and had never even met Fine.

Ultimately, two of his accusers, Zach Tomaselli (who was serving a 39-month prison sentence for molesting a teenage boy, and who admitted he lied about Fine partly as payback for SU beating Tomaselli's favorite team, Kansas, for the national title in 2003) and Floyd Van Hooser (who was serving 17 years to life in state prison for repeated robberies), admitted that they lied when they made child-molesting claims against Fine.

On November 9, 2012, federal prosecutors announced Fine would not be charged regarding the criminal investigation of child molesting accusations. Nevertheless, the case cost Fine his job, turned him into a recluse, and forced him to put his house up for sale.

It was announced on March 29, 2013, that Fine intended to file a defamation of character suit against ESPN in regard to how it handled the story. During the lawsuit, it was discovered that two ESPN executives (including the editor-in-chief of ESPN) "criticized the network's reporting on the story and said it went against ESPN's internal guidelines" in publicizing uncharged claims. In March 2016, a federal judge dismissed a libel lawsuit filed by Fine's wife, Laurie, against ESPN over the television network's reporting.

== After Syracuse ==
In August 2015 Syracuse and Boeheim settled a slander lawsuit brought by the former ball boys, regarding the coach's statement that the step-brothers were lying and were out for money by exploiting the Penn State sex abuse scandal.
