= John G. Bartlett =

American physician and medical researcher (1937–2021)

John Gill Bartlett (February 12, 1937 – January 19, 2021) was an American physician and medical researcher, specializing in infectious diseases. He was known as a pioneer in HIV/AIDS research and for his work on vancomycin as a treatment for Clostridioides difficile infection.

== Biography ==
Born and raised in Syracuse, New York, Bartlett graduated from Syracuse's Nottingham High School. He graduated from Dartmouth College in 1959 with a bachelor's degree and from Syracuse's State University of New York Upstate Medical University (SUNY Upstate) in 1963 with an M.D. He did his medical residency in internal medicine at Peter Bent Brigham Hospital (affiliated with Harvard Medical School) and at UAB Hospital (affiliated with the University of Alabama at Birmingham). At UAB Hospital, he became interested in cardiology. From 1965 to 1967 he served in the US Army Medical Corps during the Vietnam War. He was assigned to the Third Field Hospital in Saigon, where he attained the rank of captain.

During his service in Saigon, Bartlett decided to specialize in the study of infectious diseases. After leaving the US Army, he studied infectious diseases at the UCLA Medical School under the mentorship of Sydney M. Finegold. Bartlett then worked at the West Los Angeles VA Medical Center before joining the UCLA Medical School faculty. In 1975, Bartlett left Los Angeles and accepted a position at Boston's Tufts-New England Medical Center, where he was mentored by Sherwood Gorbach.

In 1980, Bartlett left Boston and accepted a position as the director of Johns Hopkins Medical School's infectious diseases division and was appointed to the Stanhope Bayne-Jones Professorship of Medicine.

Bartlett arrived at the Johns Hopkins Medical School when the AIDS epidemic was being identified. With the epidemiologist B. Frank Polk, he co-founded the second HIV/AIDS clinic in the United States. Bartlett played a key role in developing AIDS treatment regimens validated in clinical trials.

The Johns Hopkins University Press published in 1991 The Guide to Living with HIV Infection by Bartlett and Ann Finkbeiner (with a 6th edition published in 2006). In 2019 Oxford University Press published the 17th edition of Bartlett's Medical Management of HIV Infection, which was originally published by Johns Hopkins University Press in 1994 under the title Medical Management of HIV Infection. The earlier editions were co-authored by Bartlett and Joel E. Gallant (including the 2007 edition — but later editions added one or more co-authors). The Bartlett Pocket Guide to HIV/AIDS Treatment, with 19th edition published in 2019, originally had the title A Pocket Guide to Adult HIV/AIDS Treatment. Bartlett's Medical Management and the Bartlett Pocket Guide "remain the definitive textbooks on HIV clinical care." Bartlett, Sherwood Gorbach, and Neil R. Blacklow were co-editors of Infectious Diseases (1st edition, 1992; 2nd edition, 1997; 3rd edition, 2004).

Bartlett was instrumental in educating the medical community and the general public about the dangers of bioterrorism. He and Donald Henderson were co-authors, along with numerous colleagues, of papers on possible biological weapons such as "smallpox, plague, tularemia, botulism, anthrax, and hemorrhagic fever viruses." Bartlett was the president of the Infectious Diseases Society of America (IDSA) in 1999.

In 1999 Bartlett was elected a member of the National Academy of Medicine. In 2005 he received the Maxwell Finland Award from National Foundation for Infectious Diseases, as well as the Alexander Fleming Award for lifetime achievement from the Infectious Diseases Society of America.

In 2006 he was succeeded as director of the Johns Hopkins Division of Infectious Diseases by David Lee Thomas, M.D., M.P.H. In 2014 Bartlett retired from the Johns Hopkins Medical School. In 2017, Johns Hopkins Hospital opened the John G. Bartlett Specialty Practice.

He was the author or co-author of "more than 500 original papers, 330 book chapters, and 14 books."

His wife, Jean née Scott, was a registered nurse. She died in October 2020 after 50 years of marriage. Upon his death, Bartlett was survived by three sons and two daughters.

== Selected publications ==
=== Articles ===
- Gorbach, Sherwood L.; Bartlett, John G. (1974). "Anaerobic Infections". New England Journal of Medicine. 290 (23): 1289–1294. doi:10.1056/NEJM197406062902305. PMID 4597253.
- Gorbach, S. L.; Mayhew, J. W.; Bartlett, J. G.; Thadepalli, H.; Onderdonk, A. B. (1976). "Rapid diagnosis of anaerobic infections by direct gas-liquid chromatography of clinical specimens". Journal of Clinical Investigation. 57 (2): 478–484. doi:10.1172/JCI108300. PMC 436673. PMID 1254729.
- Viscidi, Raphael; Willey, Sandra; Bartlett, John G. (1981). "Isolation rates and toxigenic potential of Clostridium difficile isolates from various patient populations". Gastroenterology. 81 (1): 5–9. doi:10.1016/0016-5085(81)90644-2. PMID 7239125.
- Bartlett, John G. (1986). "Bacteriology of Hospital-Acquired Pneumonia". Archives of Internal Medicine. 146 (5): 868–871. doi:10.1001/archinte.1986.00360170064009. PMID 3516102.
- Jabs, Douglas A.; Green, W. Richard; Fox, Robin; Polk, B. Frank; Bartlett, John G. (1989). "Ocular Manifestations of Acquired Immune Deficiency Syndrome". Ophthalmology. 96 (7): 1092–1099. doi:10.1016/S0161-6420(89)32794-1. PMID 2549483.
- Volberding, Paul A.; Lagakos, Stephen W.; Koch, Matthew A.; Pettinelli, Carla; Myers, Maureen W.; Booth, David K.; Balfour, Henry H.; Reichman, Richard C.; Bartlett, John A.; Hirsch, Martin S.; Murphy, Robert L.; Hardy, W. David; Soeiro, Ruy; Fischl, Margaret A.; Bartlett, John G.; Merigan, Thomas C.; Hyslop, Newton E.; Richman, Douglas D.; Valentine, Fred T.; Corey, Lawrence (1990). "Zidovudine in Asymptomatic Human Immunodeficiency Virus Infection". New England Journal of Medicine. 322 (14): 941–949. doi:10.1056/NEJM199004053221401. PMID 1969115.
- Bartlett, John G.; Mundy, Linda M. (1995). "Community-Acquired Pneumonia". New England Journal of Medicine. 333 (24): 1618–1624. doi:10.1056/NEJM199512143332408. PMID 7477199.
- Inglesby, Thomas V.; Henderson, Donald A.; Bartlett, John G.; Ascher, Michael S.; Eitzen, Edward; Friedlander, Arthur M.; Hauer, Jerome; McDade, Joseph; Osterholm, Michael T.; O'Toole, Tara; Parker, Gerald; Perl, Trish M.; Russell, Philip K.; Tonat, Kevin; For The Working Group On Civilian Biodefense (1999). "Anthrax as a Biological Weapon". JAMA. 281 (18): 1735–1745. doi:10.1001/jama.281.18.1735. PMID 10328075.
- Henderson, Donald A.; Inglesby, Thomas V.; Bartlett, John G.; Ascher, Michael S.; Eitzen, Edward; Jahrling, Peter B.; Hauer, Jerome; Layton, Marcelle; McDade, Joseph; Osterholm, Michael T.; O'Toole, Tara; Parker, Gerald; Perl, Trish; Russell, Philip K.; Tonat, Kevin; For The Working Group On Civilian Biodefense (1999). "Smallpox as a Biological Weapon". JAMA. 281 (22): 2127–2137. doi:10.1001/jama.281.22.2127. PMID 10367824.
- Inglesby, Thomas V.; Dennis, David T.; Henderson, Donald A.; Bartlett, John G.; Ascher, Michael S.; Eitzen, Edward; Fine, Anne D.; Friedlander, Arthur M.; Hauer, Jerome; Koerner, John F.; Layton, Marcelle; McDade, Joseph; Osterholm, Michael T.; O'Toole, Tara; Parker, Gerald; Perl, Trish M.; Russell, Philip K.; Schoch-Spana, Monica; Tonat, Kevin; For The Working Group On Civilian Biodefense (2000). "Plague as a Biological Weapon". JAMA. 283 (17): 2281–2290. doi:10.1001/jama.283.17.2281. PMID 10807389.
- Arnon, Stephen S.; Schechter, Robert; Inglesby, Thomas V.; Henderson, Donald A.; Bartlett, John G.; Ascher, Michael S.; Eitzen, Edward; Fine, Anne D.; Hauer, Jerome; Layton, Marcelle; Lillibridge, Scott; Osterholm, Michael T.; O'Toole, Tara; Parker, Gerald; Perl, Trish M.; Russell, Philip K.; Swerdlow, David L.; Tonat, Kevin; For The Working Group On Civilian Biodefense (2001). "Botulinum Toxin as a Biological Weapon". JAMA. 285 (8): 1059–1070. doi:10.1001/jama.285.8.1059. PMID 11209178.
- Dennis, David T.; Inglesby, Thomas V.; Henderson, Donald A.; Bartlett, John G.; Ascher, Michael S.; Eitzen, Edward; Fine, Anne D.; Friedlander, Arthur M.; Hauer, Jerome; Layton, Marcelle; Lillibridge, Scott R.; McDade, Joseph E.; Osterholm, Michael T.; O'Toole, Tara; Parker, Gerald; Perl, Trish M.; Russell, Philip K.; Tonat, Kevin; For The Working Group On Civilian Biodefense (2001). "Tularemia as a Biological Weapon". JAMA. 285 (21): 2763–2773. doi:10.1001/jama.285.21.2763. PMID 11386933.
- Srinivasan, Arjun; Kraus, Carl N.; Deshazer, David; Becker, Patrice M.; Dick, James D.; Spacek, Lisa; Bartlett, John G.; Byrne, W. Russell; Thomas, David L. (2001). "Glanders in a Military Research Microbiologist". New England Journal of Medicine. 345 (4): 256–258. doi:10.1056/NEJM200107263450404. PMID 11474663.
- Bartlett, John G.; Perl, Trish M. (2005). "The new Clostridium difficile-What does it mean?" (PDF). New England Journal of Medicine. 353 (23): 2503–2504. doi:10.1056/NEJMe058221. PMID 16322604.
- Spellberg, Brad; Bartlett, John G.; Gilbert, David N. (2013). "The Future of Antibiotics and Resistance". New England Journal of Medicine. 368 (4): 299–302. doi:10.1056/NEJMp1215093. PMC 3617123. PMID 23343059.
- Nielsen, Travis B.; Brass, Eric P.; Gilbert, David N.; Bartlett, John G.; Spellberg, Brad (2019). "Sustainable Discovery and Development of Antibiotics — is a Nonprofit Approach the Future?". New England Journal of Medicine. 381 (6): 503–505. doi:10.1056/NEJMp1905589. PMC 6697094. PMID 31216396.

=== Books ===
- Textbook of AIDS Medicine. Williams & Wilkins. 1998. ISBN 978-0-683-30216-5.
- Management of Respiratory Tract Infections. Lippincott Williams & Wilkins. 1999. ISBN 978-0-683-30633-0.
- PDR Guide to Biological and Chemical Warfare Response. Thomson/Physicians' Desk Reference. 2002. ISBN 978-1-56363-426-0.
- The Guide to Living with HIV Infection: Developed at the Johns Hopkins AIDS Clinic. Johns Hopkins University Press. 25 September 2006. ISBN 978-0-8018-8486-3.
- Johns Hopkins ABX Guide: Diagnosis and Treatment of Infectious Diseases. Jones & Bartlett Learning, LLC. 9 September 2011. ISBN 978-1-4496-2558-0.
- Bartlett's Medical Management of HIV Infection. Oxford University Press. 22 March 2019. ISBN 978-0-19-092479-9.
- The Bartlett Pocket Guide to HIV/AIDS Treatment 2021. PPham and JBriggs LLC. 28 May 2021. ISBN 978-0-9967333-6-6.
