= Hope and Despair in the American City =

2009 book by Gerald Grant

- Author: Gerald Grant
- Language: English
- Publisher: Harvard University Press
- Publication date: 2009
- ISBN: 9780674060265

Hope and Despair in the American City: Why There Are No Bad Schools in Raleigh is a 2009 book by Gerald Grant, published by Harvard University Press.

The book's argument is that the Wake County School District of Raleigh, North Carolina has a more functional public school system than the Syracuse City School District because the former has merged economically disparate areas in the same school system and has socioeconomically balanced enrollment at its schools. Grant stated that political decisions and not what Grant describes as "conscious racism" damaged the Syracuse district. In the words of Richard Arum of New York University, Grant argued that the Wake County district was "exemplary".

The subtitle of the book refers to a saying that was made after the Wake County district, formed from a previous inner city and a previous suburban school district to merge socioeconomic and racial groups, was created.

Regina Smardon described the work as both "a masterful ethnographic survey" and a "brilliant demographic analysis".

== Background ==
Grant originated from Syracuse, New York. He had his high school education in that city. He later worked for the Washington Post in writing articles about education, then got into a PhD program at the Harvard Graduate School of Education, which he completed, and began working for Syracuse University as a professor.

== Contents ==
The use of Syracuse as the counterexample is done to show how de facto educational segregation is prevalent in the northern United States.

== Reception ==
Arum concluded that the book is "a compelling historical account." Arum argued that the author should have put more focus on student tracking done in Wake County; the author asserted that standards were maintained in classes for students on lower levels of tracking.

Smardon, who graduated from the Syracuse district, stated that the book explained to her "nagging questions" about academic failure in that district.

Publishers Weekly described it as "a must-read for anyone interested in" the book's respective fields.

== See also ==
- The World We Created at Hamilton High - Another book by Grant
- The End of Consensus - A book about the disestablishment of the socioeconomic balancing program in Wake County
