= The World We Created at Hamilton High =

1988 book by Gerald Grant

The World We Created at Hamilton High is a 1988 non-fiction book by Gerald Grant, published by Harvard University Press.

The book documents the educational history of a high school in the Northeastern United States that the work refers to as "Hamilton High School"; the book does not disclose the actual name of the school. The school documented is actually Nottingham High School in Syracuse, New York.

Grant argued in favor of school autonomy.

== Background ==
Grant, in 1988, worked for Syracuse University in the education and sociology fields, at the professor rank. He served as a consultant to get the subject school improved. William Graebner of State University of New York at Fredonia described Grant as "optimistic" and "reform-minded".

== Contents ==
The school was a heavily non-Hispanic white school at the beginning of its history, when it was a university preparatory school. The school's racial composition changed during desegregation busing. Racial tensions increased in the late 1960s and early 1970s, as did the amount of crime. John Rouse of St. Peter's College argued that the book shows how teachers' sense of power in the classroom eroded, citing how the portraits of teachers in the yearbook were moved to the back of the publication.

Racial tensions then subsided by the 1980s along with a return of student discipline. In the 1980s a large number of students from Asian countries began enrolling. Grant argued that these changes had happened in multiple schools in the United States during the portion of the 20th century.

Nicholas Lemann of The Atlantic wrote that Grant was "optimistic[...]almost jarringly so" about the future state of race relations, and that Grant had "not a hint of the feeling that if we would just return to the race relations of the fifties, everything would be all right."

== Reception ==
Graebner interpreted the work as having concern for teachers having lost their sense of authority.

== See also ==
- Hope and Despair in the American City – Another book by Grant
