= Central Technical High School =

- U.S. National Register of Historic Places
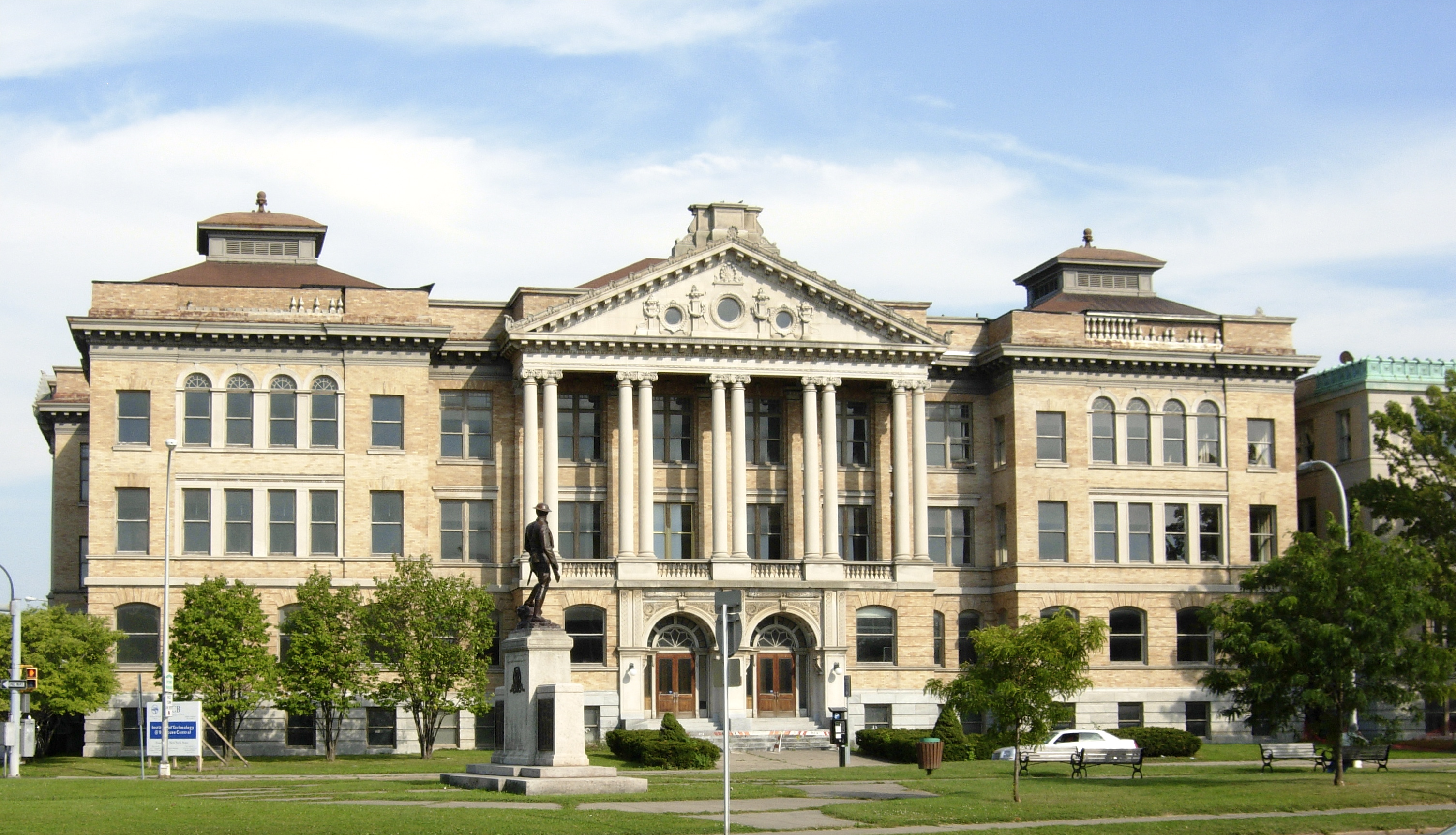

- Location within New York Location within the United States
- Location: 701 S. Warren St., Syracuse, New York
- Coordinates: 43°2′32″N 76°9′2″W
- Built: 1900
- Architect: Archimedes Russell
- Architectural style: Classical Revival, Beaux Arts
- NRHP reference No.: 81000662
- Added to NRHP: April 09, 1981

Central Technical High School, also known as Central Tech, is located on South Warren Street in Syracuse, New York. It was designed by Archimedes Russell, and built in 1900. At that time, it represented the latest in educational building design. Classes were first held in the school in 1903.

The building has been closed since 1975.

However, the building has been re-opened since 2025. The only classes held in it are for 9th and 10th graders.

The school building was added to the National Register of Historic Places in 1981.

Possible reuse of the building has been discussed several times.

In 2019, plans are active to re-purpose the building as a science, technology, engineering, arts, and math school.

In 2025, it has opened to students for 9th, and in 2026 it is accepting both 9th and 10th graders.

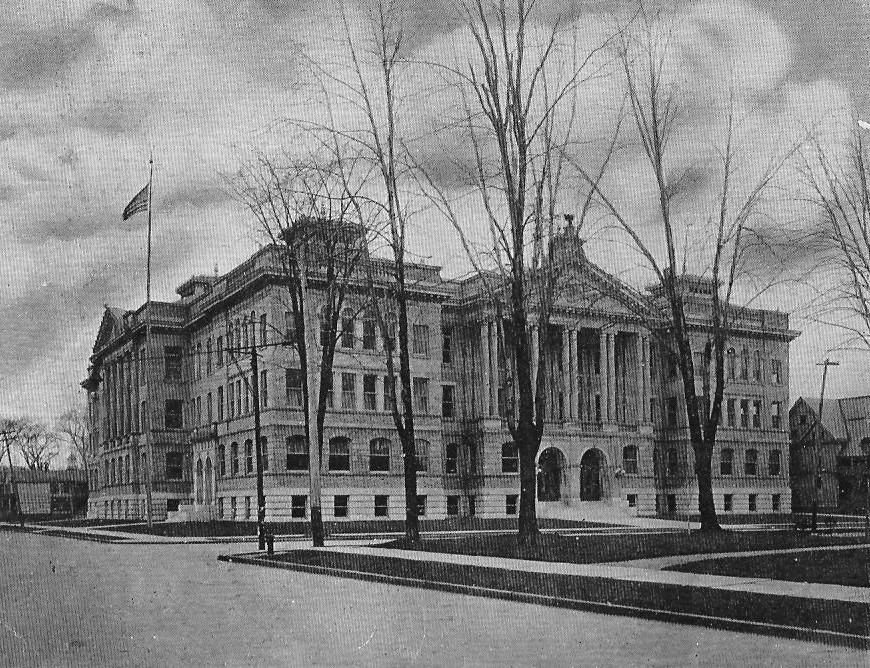
Vintage postcard image of Central Technical High School in Syracuse.

== See also ==
- Institute of Technology at Syracuse Central, a high school opened in 2007 adjacent to Central High School.
