= The End of Consensus =

2015 non-fiction book by Toby L. Parcel and Andrew J. Taylor

The End of Consensus: Diversity, Neighborhoods, and the Politics of Public School Assignments is a 2015 non-fiction book by Toby L. Parcel and Andrew J. Taylor, published by University of North Carolina Press.

The book covers how the Wake County Public School System program to socioeconomically balance its schools was abolished due to the local political climate. The authors state that the voters in Wake County, North Carolina liked ethnic diversity but disliked year round education and a lack of school choice, and voters opposed those school district rules.

== Background ==
Prior to writing the book, they conducted a literature review on the topic. The authors did a spring 2011 survey to determine how residents of Wake County felt about the socioeconomic student assignment practices, with 1,706 people surveyed. The authors also specifically held a focus group for African-American residents, with another focus group for White residents. Additionally, the authors specifically conducted interviews of Wake County-area activists and politicians; 24 such interviews were conducted.

== Contents ==
The first chapter describes how education influences the ability to advance in society and how educational segregation or lack thereof affects this trajectory. The school district's history is in the second chapter, and the end of the socioeconomic balancing is covered in the third, fourth, and fifth chapters. A comparison between the Wake County district and other comparable school districts is in the end chapter.

John R. Logan of Brown University described the book as "relatively short".

== Reception ==
Erica Frankenburg and Kendra Taylor of Pennsylvania State University praised the book's "rich account of the context of Wake County".

Alexander Hyres of the University of Virginia wrote that the book serves as "a sound foundation and model for future scholars".

== See also ==
- Hope and Despair in the American City - Book that compared the diversity policies in Wake County to the lack of such policies in Syracuse, New York
