= Nottingham High School (New York) =

Location
- 3100 E Genesee St; Syracuse, New York 13224; United States; 43°2′28.26″N 76°5′53.75″W

Information
- Type: Public
- Motto: Virtus Eruditio Assidiutas
- Established: 1921
- School district: Syracuse City School District
- NCES School ID: 362859003871
- Principal: Hugh A. Hogle IV
- Teaching staff: 89.02 (on an FTE basis)
- Grades: 9–12
- Enrollment: 1,350 (2024–2025)
- Student to teacher ratio: 15.17
- Campus: Suburban
- Colors: Blue and Orange
- Mascot: Bulldogs
- Newspaper: Common Ground
- Yearbook: The Bulldog
- Website: nottingham.syracusecityschools.com

William Nottingham High School is a public high school located at 3100 East Genesee Street in Syracuse, New York. Part of the Syracuse City School District, the high school has an enrollment of about 1350 students in grades 9–12.

The school was established in 1921 (making it the oldest, still functioning high school in the city of Syracuse) in the building that is now T. Aaron Levy Middle School. It was named for the prominent Syracuse attorney William Nottingham (1853–1921), who had served on the Syracuse University Board of Trustees and on the New York State Board of Regents. In 1952 the high school moved to its current location on East Genesee Street. Between 1977 and 1982 a new library, gym, and Olympic-sized swimming pool were added, and a walkway was built connecting the former George Washington Elementary School to the main building.

The school offers many sports, including football, cheer, tennis, swimming, lacrosse, volleyball, bowling, golf, basketball, indoor track, crew, track & field, cross country, baseball, softball, and soccer. However, several of the sports are combined with other local schools to form Syracuse and Syracuse East.

The school offers many Advanced Placement and Honors courses such as AP World History, AP Literature & Composition, AP Language & Composition, AP United States History, AP Government & Politics, and AP Calculus AB. It also offers some courses in association with nearby colleges and universities such as Onondaga Community College, Syracuse University and SUNY ESF (Environmental Science and Forestry). The Syracuse University program is called Syracuse University Project Advanced (SUPA) and offers college level courses in biology, psychology, statistics, calculus, physics, sociology, English, finance, and entrepreneurship. Courses through SUNY ESF include Conservation Psychology, Public Speaking, Creative Writing, Global Environment, Economics, and Government. The school also offers pre-calculus through Onondaga Community College.

In terms of academics, the school grades on a numerical scale out of 100. Weighted coursework includes class through AP, SUPA, SUNY ESF, PLTW, and OCC. The school traditionally announces a valedictorian and salutatorian halfway through the school year for the graduating class. Traditionally, the top 20 of the graduating class earn recognition upon graduation, with the valedictorian and salutatorian receiving medals and giving addresses. Graduation ceremonies have recently been held at Onondaga Community College’s SRC Arena.

The school was the subject of the book The World We Created at Hamilton High, by Gerald Grant.

== History ==
The current school opened in 1953.

The school was a heavily non-Hispanic white school at the beginning of its history, when it was a university preparatory school. The students were generally upper middle class and from parents in professional positions. Nottingham's dress code was meant to uphold authority.

In 1966 the attendance boundaries were modified. The African American student population increased after that year.

The school's racial composition changed during desegregation busing. Racial tensions increased in the late 1960s and early 1970s, as did the amount of crime. A previous principal was seriously injured in an assault that was sustained during a race riot, so the district had a bodyguard protecting the next principal.

Racial tensions then subsided by the 1980s along with a return of student discipline. In the 1980s a large number of students from Asian countries began enrolling.

== Statistics ==
=== Demographics ===
For the 2016-2017 school year Nottingham had a total enrollment of 1344 students: 408 Grade 9, 352 Grade 10, 253 Grade 11, and 298 Grade 12, with 33 students "ungraded".

For the same year, 78% (1,044) of the student body was economically disadvantaged. Additionally, 21% of students were English Language Learners.

The student body's racial/ethnic origin was: Black or African American 57% (764), White 20% (274), Hispanic or Latino 8% (110), Asian or Native/Hawaiian/Other Pacific Islander 12% (166), American Indian or Alaska Native <1% (4).

=== Academics ===
In 2016, Nottingham graduated 208 students, 64% (133) of these students received Regents Diplomas, 24% (50) received Regents Diplomas with "Advanced Designation". During the 2015-2016 school year, 9% (29) students dropped out. In 2016, Nottingham had a graduation rate of 66%.

For the 2006-2007 school year 95 teachers worked at Nottingham, along with 1 principal, 3 assistant principals, and 8 other professional staff. 423 Classes were taught, with an overall average class size of 24 students per class.

The 2005-2006 school year had an annual attendance rate of 90%. During the same year 305 (23%) students were suspended for one full day or longer.

== Bands and choirs ==
Nottingham has a number of bands and choirs, in which any student may participate. Some require auditions, and most can be taken for credit.

=== Bands ===
- Celtic Band (defunct as of January 2007)
- Chamber Ensemble
- Concert Band
- Pep Band
- World Drumming

=== Choirs ===
- Chorale
- Gospel Choir
- Vocal Jazz

=== The Nottingham Celtic Ensemble (defunct) ===
The Nottingham Celtic Ensemble was a small, trad-oriented, student-directed Celtic band at Nottingham that ran from 2004 to 2006. Nottingham was the only school in the district to have this type of ensemble.

The Celtic Ensemble originally played at numerous venues in Nottingham High School and around the Syracuse community, including the annual Westcott Street Cultural Fair and Petit Branch Library. In 2005, members of the Celtic Ensemble performed in the pit for Nottingham's production of Under Milk Wood. While the Celtic Ensemble generally performed pieces of Irish origin, they occasionally played music from other parts of the British Isles, original compositions, and popular tunes. The Celtic Ensemble has been defunct since January 2007.

== Notable alumni ==
=== Arts and entertainment ===
- Jeff Altman (standup comedian)
- John Berendt (author, Midnight in the Garden of Good and Evil, among others)
- Ben Burtt (sound effects designer for Star Wars and other films)
- Thom Filicia (interior designer, cast member of Queer Eye for the Straight Guy)
- William Lundigan (film and TV actor)
- Michael Herr (author, Dispatches, Walter Winchell: A Novel, Kubrick, co-wrote screenplay for the film Full Metal Jacket)
- Mark Levinson (producer of Mystic Pizza, Teen Wolf, and Home Alone)
- Gordon MacRae (actor, singer, father of Meredith MacRae)
- Hank O'Neal (photographer and author)
- Camille Paglia (author, critic)
- Tony Trischka (banjo player and teacher - "most influential banjo player of the latter part of the 20th century, certainly in terms of his profound influence on succeeding generations of modern players." - Banjo Newsletter)
- Jimmy Van Heusen, born Edward Chester Babcock (composer, "Darn That Dream", "I Thought About You", "Imagination", "Polka Dots and Moonbeams", "My Kind of Town", among many others)

=== Sports ===
- Derrick Gore (NFL football player)
- Nathan Knight (NBA, Israeli Basketball Premier League basketball player)
- Felisha Legette-Jack (head coach, Syracuse University women's basketball)
- Dorsey Levens (NFL football player)
- Keith Moody (NFL football player)
- Doug Swift (member of Miami Dolphins 1972 undefeated team)

=== Government ===
- David Bishop Minnesota state representative
- Steven K. Galson (former acting Surgeon General of the United States)
- Dan Maffei (United States Congressman for New York's 24th congressional district)

=== Other ===
- John G. Bartlett (physician and medical researcher in infectious diseases)

== School facilities ==
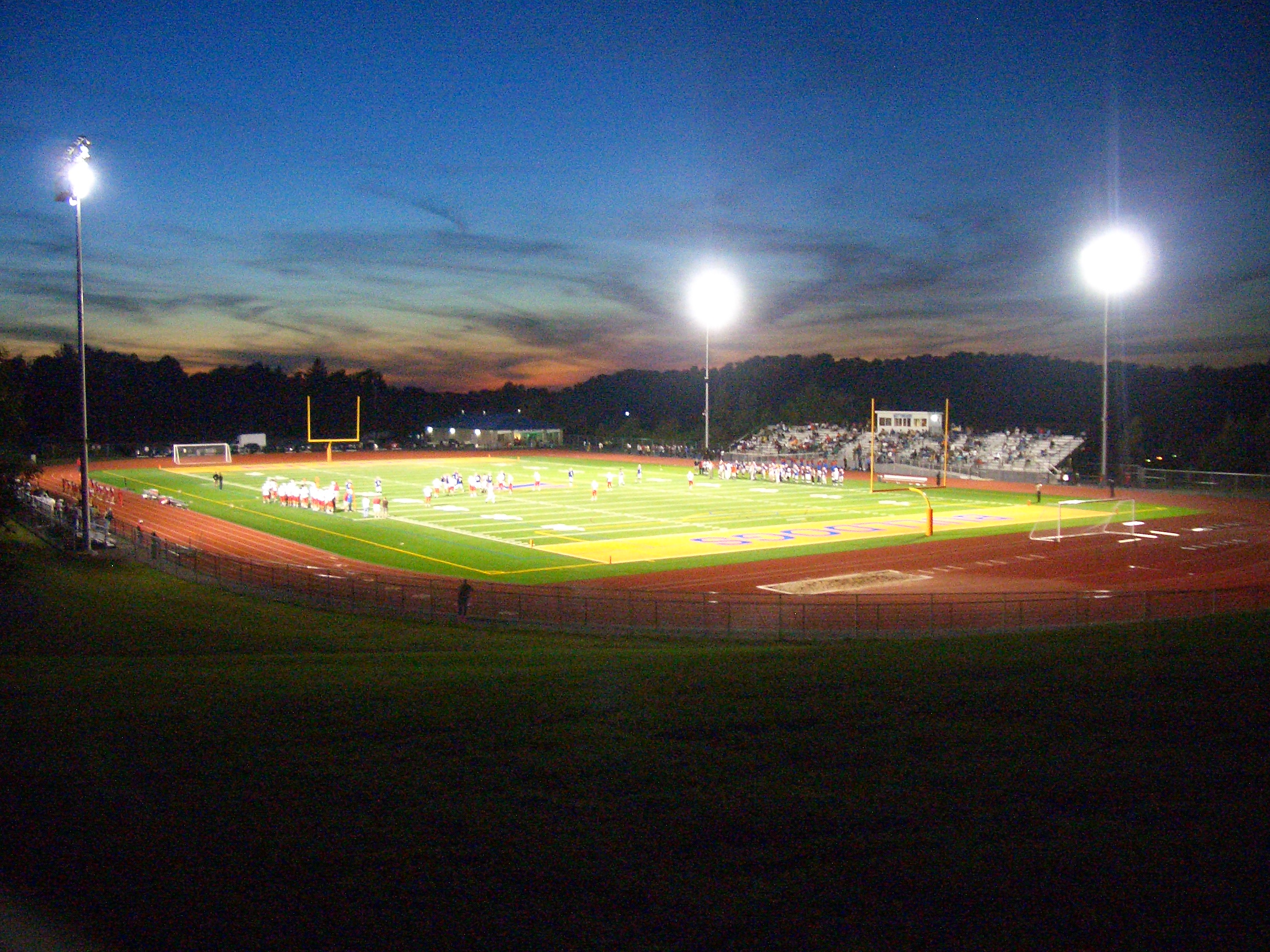
A nighttime football game takes place on Nottingham's athletic fields.

- The "George Washington" wing of Nottingham was a former neighboring elementary school. It was annexed in 1977 and is attached by a walkway. It now houses an array of classes.
- Nottingham has its own Olympic-sized pool, which other local schools utilize as well for regional swim meets.
- Nottingham got a $20 million football field approximately a decade ago.
- Nottingham had a "facelift" to its auditorium, with a new name: the Len Fonte Center for the Performing Arts
- Nottingham is currently about to undergo a renovation that will bring air conditioning, asbestos-free classes, and the return of the memorable arch in the Main Entrance of the building. The renovations will also bring internal and technological improvements.

== Publications ==
The school has a yearbook. In the 1970s the yearbook's portraits of teachers was moved to the back of the publication. John Rouse of St. Peter's College argued that this was an example of teachers losing their power in that decade.

== See also ==
- Scottholm, Syracuse
