= Stephen Arnon =

Discoverer of infant botulism and developer of BabyBIG

Stephen Arnon (October 14, 1946 – August 17, 2022) was an American physician, and infant botulism researcher. He is credited with the first descriptions of infant botulism and led the development of a successful orphan drug program to treat infant botulism, BabyBIG. Uniquely the drug was developed and initially manufactured by the public sector. BabyBIG was subsequently approved by the FDA in 2003 and is the major treatment for infant botulism. The treatment can significantly shorten hospitalization. Stephen Arnon trained in medicine at Harvard Medical School and spent his career working for the California Department of Health, where he established and led the Infant Botulism treatment and prevention program.

== Discovery of infant botulism ==
Infant botulism is a unique form of the disease botulism distinguished from most cases of adult botulism by its etiology. Instead of intoxication by foods containing botulinum neurotoxin complexes, the disease is characterized by colonization and subsequent toxin production within the gastrointestinal tract. In a pivotal paper in 1976, Arnon and Thaddeus Madura described their isolation of Clostridium botulinum bacteria from infants in California suffering from the symptoms of botulism, including flaccid paralysis. Early experimental treatments with adult botulism antitoxins which are equine products showed these products had a short half-life and caused serum sickness, which made them unsuited for pediatric application.

Work by Arnon and colleagues would continue where he and colleagues were the first to describe the association of infant botulism with honey.

== Development of BabyBIG ==
Since infant botulism is the result of colonization with Clostridium botulinum bacteria, result antitoxins can reduce the length of the disease. The disease is caused almost exclusively by Botulinum neurotoxins serotypes A and B. The heptavalent botulinum antitoxin (targeting all seven major serotypes) was considered by Clinicians to be inappropriate for infants infected with Clostridium botulinum. As a result Arnon's team worked to develop BabyBIG, an orphan drug which is an human polyclonal antiserum to be given to infants with botulism. The drug is near unique in the United States in that it was developed as a public service by a state public health authority and manufactured by another state health authority, the Massachusetts Public Health Biologic Laboratories who manufactured the first batch of the drug without charge.

The antisera are derived from human volunteers, who have botulinum immunity owing to vaccination with investigational botulinum vaccines owing to occupational exposure. These are largely laboratory workers who work with botulinum toxins or the bacteria or a regular basis.

In 1998, the FDA authorized nationwide distribution as an open label investigational product.

In 2003, BabyBIG was formally approved by the FDA.

In 2006, a pivotal clinical trial published in the New England Journal of Medicine showed that BabyBIG significantly reduced length of hospital stay, and patient ICU costs.

The drug remains exclusively distributed by the Infant Botulism Treatment and Prevention Program. This discovery has been credited with saving the lives of thousands of infants since its introduction and the same system for distribution created by Arnon and colleagues continues to be of use in detecting the source of outbreaks of infant botulism. For instance in November 2025, an active outbreak was detected by Infant Botulism Treatment and Prevention Clinicians leading to recall of contaminated baby formula.

== Personal life ==
Stephen Arnon was the son of Daniel Israel Arnon, a noted professor of plant biology at University of California, Berkeley. He graduated from Harvard University with three degrees, a BA, MD, and MPH.

== Honors ==
Fellow of the Infectious Disease Society of America

Distinguished Commendation by the Commissioner of the Food and Drug's Administration.
