= Sangertown Square =

Shopping mall in New York State, U.S.

Coordinates: 43.082495°N 75.315434°W

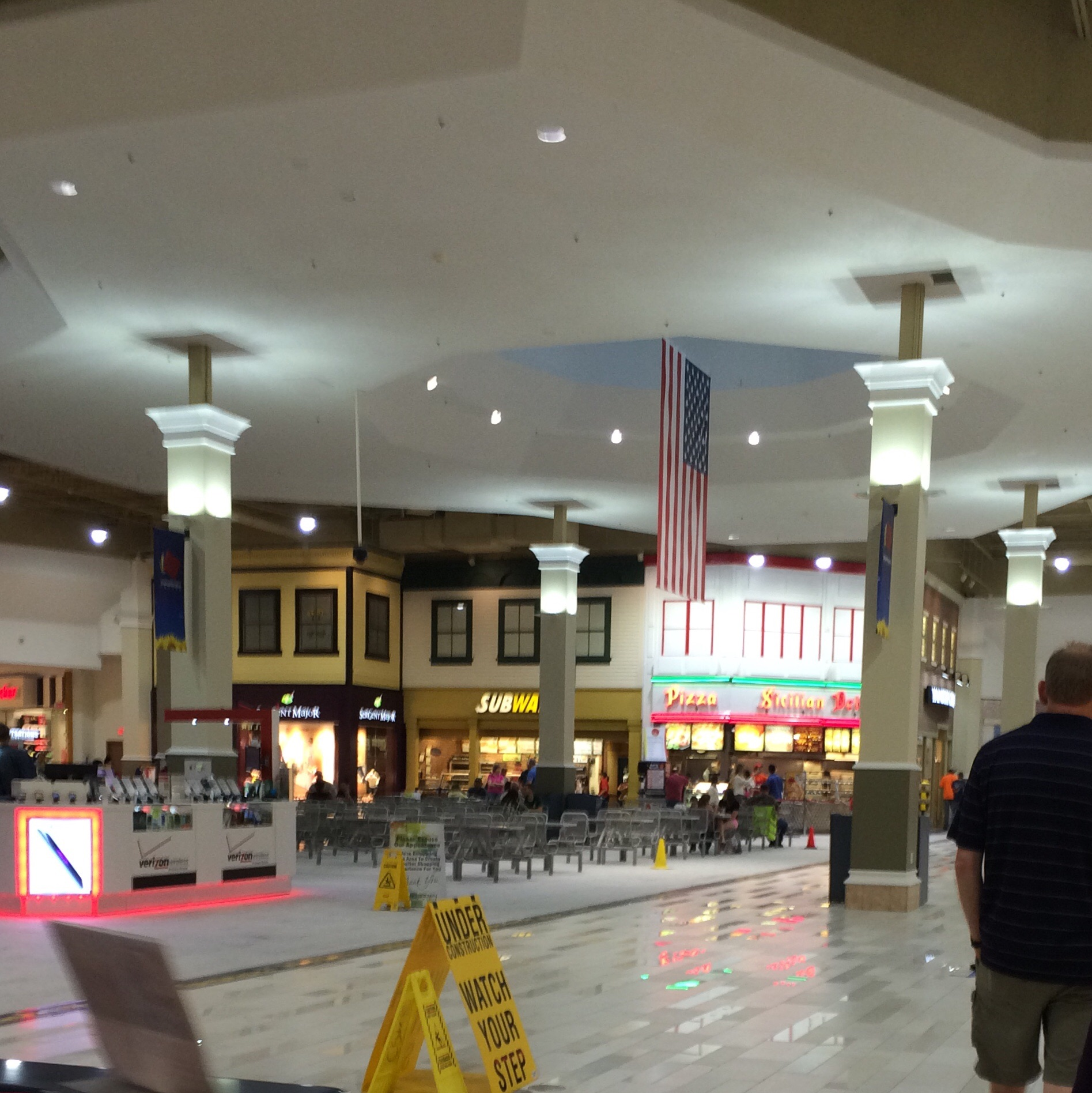
- Mall interior
- Opened: July 1980
- Owner: The Pyramid Companies
- Num. of stores: 50
- Num. of anchor tenants: 4
- Floor area: 869,758 sq ft (80,803 m^{2})
- Floors: 1
- Website: www.sangertown.com

Sangertown Square is a shopping mall located in New Hartford, New York between New York State Route 5 and New York State Route 8 near Utica, New York. Sangertown Square is a single-story mall, and comprises 869,758 sq ft (80,803 m^{2}) of leasable retail space. The mall was built in 1980 and has a central food court and 50 storefronts. Its anchor stores are the retailers Boscov's and Target.

== History ==
The mall opened in July 1980 with Hess's, JCPenney, and Sears as its anchor stores. Other stores in the mall at its opening included Radio Shack, General Nutrition Center, Endicott Johnson, Liberty Travel, and Waldenbooks. Chuck E Cheese's Pizza Time Theater opened in 1982 but closed in 1985 because of the video game crash of 1983.

Hess's became Pittsburgh, Pennsylvania-based Kaufmann's in 1994. Bradlees closed around 2001 and was demolished and replaced with a Target store by 2002. Kaufmann's became a Macy's in September 2006.

In 2009, Circuit City closed, and was replaced by HomeGoods.

In September 2012, DSW opened as a junior anchor within the shopping concourse.

Sears closed in 2015. It was replaced by Boscov's in October 2016.

JCPenney closed in September 2020, due to the COVID-19 pandemic and reduced sales.

On January 6, 2021, Macy's, announced its closure. This left the mall with two anchor stores: Target and Boscov's.

=== 2025 shooting ===
On March 1, 2025, an isolated shooting incident occurred in the mall between the food court and Target at 12:45:22 p.m., 5 shots were heard, and people soon rushed to safety in crowds. Police and an ambulance soon rushed to the scene. The only victim was a man, who was shot 5 times reportedly in the arm. He was taken to the hospital in non-critical condition according to New Hartford Town Supervisor Paul Miscione. The suspect soon fled, heading east of the mall. Shortly after, the mall was evacuated. Trooper Jennifer Jiron, a spokesperson for State Police has stated that the victim is not cooperating with investigators. Security footage from Stella Salon shows crowds of people rushing to safety through the exit next to the Target entrance and hiding in the stores' back room and restroom. New York police have stated that it was not an active shooter situation, and New Hartford police have advised people to stay away from the area.

=== Former stores ===
- Chuck E. Cheese's Pizza Time Theatre (closed July 29, 1985)
- Hess's (closed 1994)
- Bradlees (closed ~2001)
- Kaufmann's (closed 2006)
- Circuit City (closed 2009)
- Sears (closed June 2015)
- JCPenney (closed September 2020)
- Macy's (closed April 2021)

== Current stores ==
- American Eagle
- Ashcroft & Oak
- Auntie Anne's
- Banter
- Bath & Body Works
- Billy Beez
- Blue Sox Academy
- Boscov's
- Charlotte Russe
- China Express
- Claire's
- Cooperstown Connection
- CVS Pharmacy "Inside the Target Building"
- Dick's Sporting Goods
- DSW
- Earthbound Trading Co.
- Eternity
- Famous Footwear
- Foot Locker
- FYE
- Game Craze
- Hannoush Jewelers
- Hollister Co.
- HomeGoods
- Hot Topic
- I-Candie's
- IXpressFix
- Jawns Over
- Journeys (opened 2023)
- Pandora
- Rainbow Zen
- Royal Jewellers
- Scentsations
- ShareNet
- Snipes
- Sole Solution
- Spencer's
- Stella Salon
- Strong Spas
- Target
- Torrid
- Victoria's Secret
- Yankee Candle
- Zumiez
