= Fingerlakes Mall =

Indoor shopping mall near Auburn, NY

Coordinates: 42°55′49″N 76°36′41″W

- Location: Aurelius, New York, United States (near Auburn)
- Opened: 1980
- Developer: The Pyramid Company
- Owner: Siba Management
- Num. of stores: 28
- Num. of anchor tenants: 1
- Floor area: 410,000 square feet (38,000 m^{2})
- Floors: 1 plus partial upper level
- Parking: 2,149 spaces
- Website: fingerlakesmall.com

Fingerlakes Mall is an enclosed shopping mall outside the city of Auburn, New York, United States, in the town of Aurelius. The mall currently features a Bass Pro Shops.

== History ==
Fingerlakes Mall was developed by The Pyramid Companies of Syracuse, New York in 1980. The original anchor stores at the mall were Chappell's, JCPenney, Sears and Kmart. In June 1992, the mall was sold to Jager Management, who in turn sold it to Gregory Greenfield & Associates (GG&A) five months later. Under GG&A's management, and with Jones Lang LaSalle as a leasing agent, the mall was renovated inside and outside. Bass Pro Shops, opened in 2004.

JCPenney closed permanently in 2020.
