= Institute of Technology at Syracuse Central =

Location
- 258 East Adams St; Syracuse, New York 13202; United States; 43°2′32″N 76°9′0″W

Information
- Type: Public
- School district: Syracuse City School District
- NCES School ID: 362859005977
- Principal: Samantha Maddox
- Teaching staff: 47.88 (on an FTE basis)
- Grades: 9-12
- Enrollment: 598 (2024-2025)
- Student to teacher ratio: 12.49
- Campus: City
- Colors: Blue and Red
- Mascot: Eagles
- Website: itc.syracusecityschools.com

The Institute of Technology at Syracuse Central (commonly known as ITC), is a four-year, comprehensive, selective enrollment public high school located in downtown Syracuse, New York. The principal is Samantha Maddox.

== History ==
Old postcard of Central High School

The historic Central Technical High School (commonly known as Central Tech or CT) closed in 1975.

The building that currently houses ITC, was originally an annex of the historic building and has long housed the district's vocational and technical programs.

During this time, CT's courses were offered to junior and senior students only, with general education courses being completed at one of the district's traditional high schools.

By the early 2000s, many in the community were advocating for a renovation of the historic building, establishing a fifth high school. This dialogue eventually led to the creation of the Joint Schools Construction Board and the renovation of many Syracuse schools.

The annex building, located on East Adams Street, officially opened as a comprehensive high school in September 2007, welcoming full-time, freshman students. Interior renovations and additions were completed in 2012.

== Student body and academics ==
ITC offers classes in general education, in a college-prep curriculum. Technical and career programs include Automotive Tech, Biotechnology, Culinary Arts, Electrical Technology, Mechanical Technology, and Media Communications.

== Sports ==
ITC has varsity and junior varsity football and basketball teams. They also have district bowling, baseball, and lacrosse teams. For girls, there are volleyball and softball teams. Track is also available for boys and girls.
