= Corcoran High School =

Location
- 919 Glenwood Ave; Syracuse, New York 13207; United States; 43.019422°N 76.174221°W

Information
- Type: Public
- Motto: "εκτιμουν το παρελθον μας με τα ματια μας για το μελλον" (Greek for "Appreciating our past with our eyes on the future")
- Established: 1964/1965
- School district: Syracuse City School District
- NCES School ID: 362859003850
- Principal: Amber Adams
- Teaching staff: 88.83 (on an FTE basis)
- Grades: 9-12
- Enrollment: 1,338 (2024-2025)
- Student to teacher ratio: 15.06
- Campus: Urban
- Colors: Maroon and White
- Mascot: Cougars
- Yearbook: Glen Echo
- Website: corcoran.syracusecityschools.com

Thomas J. Corcoran High School is a public high school located in Syracuse, New York, having approximately 1800 students. In 2005, it became a member of the International Baccalaureate Diploma Program. The principal is Amber Adams.

== Facilities ==
The facilities at Corcoran High School consist of 71 classrooms, a library, four computer labs, an auditorium, two gymnasiums, a weight room, a pool and a state of the art outdoor athletic stadium.

== Drama ==
The Corcoran Association of Student Theatre (commonly referred to as C.A.S.T.) is an extracurricular performing troupe run cooperatively by faculty advisors with the input of a student executive board. The Corcoran Association of Student Theatre prides itself as one of the only high school programs in Central New York to boast a full length theatre season, on par with the offerings of many local community and semi-pro theatres.

== Athletics ==
Corcoran participates in the Section 3 region of the New York State Public High School Athletic Association in the Central New York Counties League (CNYCL) (for most sports) in the AA division. In August 2007 Corcoran and 12 other high schools in Section 3 left the Onondaga High School League (OHSL) and joined the newly formed CNYCL.

=== State championships ===
- Girls Basketball – 1993, 1998
- Boys Cross Country – 1979, 1986, 1990, 1992, 1993
- Boys Hockey – 2019

== Notable alumni ==
- Jimmy Collins (1967), Retired NBA player, former head coach of the University of Illinois at Chicago men's basketball team
- Craig Shirley (1974), The New York Times bestselling author
- Joanie Mahoney (1983), Lawyer, Chief Operating Officer, former Onondaga County Executive
- Martin Sexton (1984), Singer, Songwriter
- Moody McCarthy (1984), Comedian
- Jason Stanley (1986), Jacob Urowsky Professor of Philosophy at Yale University (formerly Rutgers, Cornell, Michigan, and Oxford)
- Will Allen (1996), NFL cornerback for the Miami Dolphins
- Jeanette J. Epps (1988) Astronaut, first African-American woman assigned to board the International Space Station
- Jamel Richardson (2001), CFL wide receiver for the Montreal Alouettes
- Jo-Lonn Dunbar (2003), NFL linebacker for the New Orleans Saints
- Bob Swan, CEO of Intel
- Mary Mara (1960–2022) Actor
