= George Fowler High School =

High school in New York, United States

Location
- 227 Magnolia St; Syracuse, New York 13204; United States; 43°2′38″N 76°10′22″W

Information
- Type: Public
- School district: Syracuse City School District
- NCES School ID: 362859006480
- Principal: Abby Dempsey
- Teaching staff: 87.81 (on an FTE basis)
- Grades: 9-12
- Enrollment: 1,126 (2024-2025)
- Student to teacher ratio: 12.82
- Campus: City
- Colors: Red and Black
- Mascot: Falcons
- Yearbook: Talon
- Website: psla.syracusecityschools.com

George Fowler High School (Public Service Leadership Academy) is a high school located at 227 Magnolia Street in Syracuse, New York, part of the Syracuse City School District. The principal is Abby Dempsey.

== Notable alumni ==
- Amir Anderson
