= Henninger High School =

Location
- 600 Robinson St; Syracuse, New York 13206; United States; 43.058°N 76.119°W

Information
- Type: Public
- Established: 1965
- School district: Syracuse City School District
- NCES School ID: 362859003864
- Principal: Jamie Commisso
- Teaching staff: 111.71 (on an FTE basis)
- Grades: 9-12
- Enrollment: 1,483 (2024-2025)
- Student to teacher ratio: 13.28
- Campus: Suburban
- Colors: Black and Gold
- Mascot: Black Knights
- Yearbook: Crusader
- Website: henninger.syracusecityschools.com

Anthony A. Henninger High School /ˈhɛnɪŋɡər/ is a high school in the Syracuse City School District. Henninger is the largest of the four high schools in the district with an enrollment of approximately 1800 students.

== History ==
Henninger High School was built in the mid-1960s to merge two institutions in the area, North High School and Eastwood High School. The latter was in a neighborhood that was once a village and was later annexed by the city of Syracuse.

Originally, the school was going to be named Northeast High. However, by the time the school was finished, it was decided that the school would be named after the then mayor of Syracuse, Anthony A. Henninger.

== Facilities ==
The Henninger High School campus includes an auditorium and an indoor swimming pool. Its 29-acre site also contains an athletic complex with ball fields, football fields, a competition running track, and tennis courts.

The adjacent Sunnycrest Park includes two turf football fields, six tennis courts, softball and baseball fields, basketball courts, a running track, an ice rink, and a golf course.

== Athletics ==
Henninger participates in boys' and girls' athletics in Section III of the New York State Public High School Athletic Association. Its athletic programs include boys' basketball, football, lacrosse, bowling, soccer, tennis, hockey, swimming, golf, and track, as well as girls' basketball, soccer, swimming, volleyball, tennis, bowling, lacrosse, track, and crew. Some sports are organized jointly with other Syracuse City School District high schools.

== Music/Fine Arts ==
Henninger has four branches of its fine arts department: band, chorus, orchestra and drama.

=== Band ===
The Henninger Band performs in several venues annually. The pep band plays at all home basketball and football games. The marching band performs in several parades a year and is the only high school band that has performed in the annual Syracuse St. Patrick's Day Parade every year since the parade's establishment in 1985. In 2007, the band achieved first place out of all high school bands. Its successful Jazz Ensemble is well known throughout the area and goes to several competitions throughout the year. In 1996 and 1998, the Jazz Ensemble won National Invitational competitions in Myrtle Beach, SC with the trumpet section winning "Best Trumpet Section" in 1998. Several individual awards were also won by the lead trumpet player, pianist, and guitarist. The 2004-2005 Jazz Ensemble won several National Invitational competitions in Myrtle Beach, SC and Virginia Beach, VA, winning "Stellar Trumpet Section" and several individual awards were won including lead trumpet, Tee Nelson, and solo trumpet, Wayne Tucker. The Wind Ensemble, a select version of its main Concert Band traditionally plays a copy of the original arrangement of Leroy Anderson's Sleigh Ride.

=== Drama ===
The Henninger High School Drama Club puts on 2-3 performances a year. Unlike many high schools in the area, at least two of these performances are musicals. In the past several years, the club has been particularly ambitious. In the spring of 2006, they performed the Syracuse area debut (High School and professional) of Elton John and Tim Rice's: Aida. In the fall of the same year they performed the Syracuse area debut of Disney's High School Musical. In the spring of 2008 Henninger was the first high school in the area to do the musical, Miss Saigon. Other shows in recent years include Fiddler on the Roof in 2004, West Side Story in Fall 2007, and Once On This Island in Spring 2010.

== Academics ==
Henninger High School's academic program is different in that it is divided into various "focus teams." The four main teams are Business, Media and Communications, Art Focus and Health Careers. The two largest teams, Health Careers and Art Focus are the only programs of their kind in the surrounding area. Health Careers in particular is a program aimed for students heading towards the medical profession. Benefits from Health Careers include many medical-based courses as well as volunteer work at local hospitals.

Henninger High School also has chapters in the National Honor Society, Tri-M Music Honor Society and the only chapter of the National Art Honor Society in Upstate New York

== Notable alumni ==
- Andray Blatche – professional basketball player
- Karl Buechner – metalcore vocalist for Earth Crisis, Freya and Path of Resistance
- Wallie Howard Jr. – Syracuse police officer killed in the line of duty
- Andy Mineo – Christian hip hop artist
- Joseph A. Nicoletti – Syracuse City Council and New York State Assembly representative
- Jessimae Peluso – stand-up comedian and television personality from MTV's Girl Code
- Tom Romano – professional baseball player
- Ray Seals – professional football player
- Lazarus Sims – professional basketball player
- Marquise Walker – professional football player
- Frank Whaley – actor, director, screenwriter and comedian
