= Syracuse City School District =

School district in the U.S. state of New York

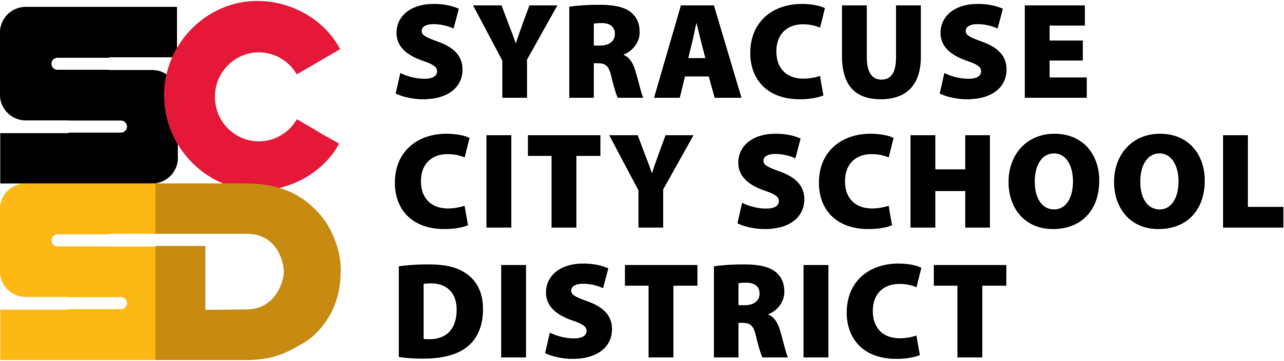

Address
- 725 Harrison Street Syracuse, New York, 13210; United States

District information
- Type: Public
- Grades: Pre-kindergarten – 12
- Established: 1848; 178 years ago
- Superintendent: Anthony Q. Davis
- Accreditation: New York State Board of Regents
- Schools: 5 high schools 6 middle schools 7 K-8 schools 14 elementary schools 4 alternative schools/programs

Students and staff
- Students: 18,398 (2022–23)
- Teachers: 1,546.62 (FTE)
- Staff: 2,167.39 (FTE)
- Student–teacher ratio: 11.90

Other information
- Unions: NYSUT, Syracuse Teachers Association
- Telephone: (315) 435-4499
- Website: syracusecityschools.com

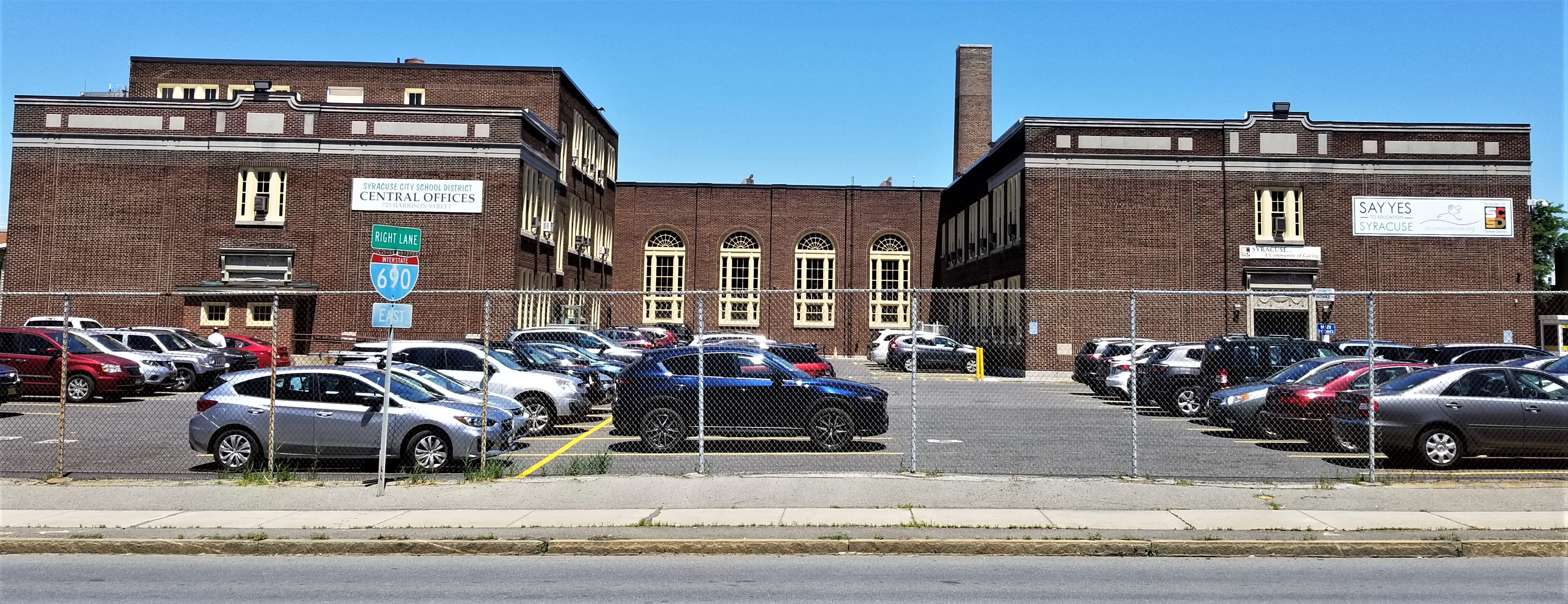
Syracuse City School District main office in 2018

The Syracuse City School District is a public school district serving students in pre-kindergarten through twelfth grade from Syracuse, New York. The district includes the entire city limits.

Syracuse City Schools enrolls 20,000 students in over thirty primary and secondary school buildings. The school district is run by a board of education that sets school policy and approves school spending. Having the designation of a city school district, the district's budget is a sub-item in Syracuse, New York's municipal budget. The board hires a superintendent under contract to carry out its policies.

== Schools ==
The former Syracuse Central High School, home of Syracuse STEAM High School

=== High schools ===
- Corcoran High School
- George Fowler High School
- Henninger High School
- Institute of Technology at Syracuse Central
- Nottingham High School
- Syracuse STEAM High School

=== Middle schools (6-8) ===
- Clary Middle School
- Brighton Academy Middle School
- Expeditionary Learning Middle School
- Grant Middle School
- Lincoln Middle School
- Syracuse STEM @ Blodgett Middle School
- Bellevue Middle School Academy (Now closed)
- Levy Middle School (Now closed but has recently housed two schools)

=== Elementary schools (K-5) ===
- Bellevue Elementary School
- Delaware Elementary School
- STEAM @ Dr. King
- Dr. Weeks School
- Franklin Magnet School
- Hughes Magnet School (Currently being phased out into Syracuse Latin)
- LeMoyne Elementary School
- McKinley-Brighton Magnet School
- Montessori @ Lemoyne
- Porter Elementary School
- Salem Hyde School
- Seymour Dual Language Academy
- VanDuyn School
- Webster School

=== K-8 schools ===
- Aria S. Huntington School
- Edward Smith School
- Frazer School
- H.W. Smith School
- Roberts School
- Syracuse Latin
- Frank C. McCarthy School (Closed)

=== Alternative schools ===
- Elmcrest School
- Syracuse Renaissance Academy at Carnegie
- William R. Beard School

=== Other campuses ===
- Central Technical Vocational Center
- Early Childhood Program
- Johnson Center

== Say Yes to Education ==
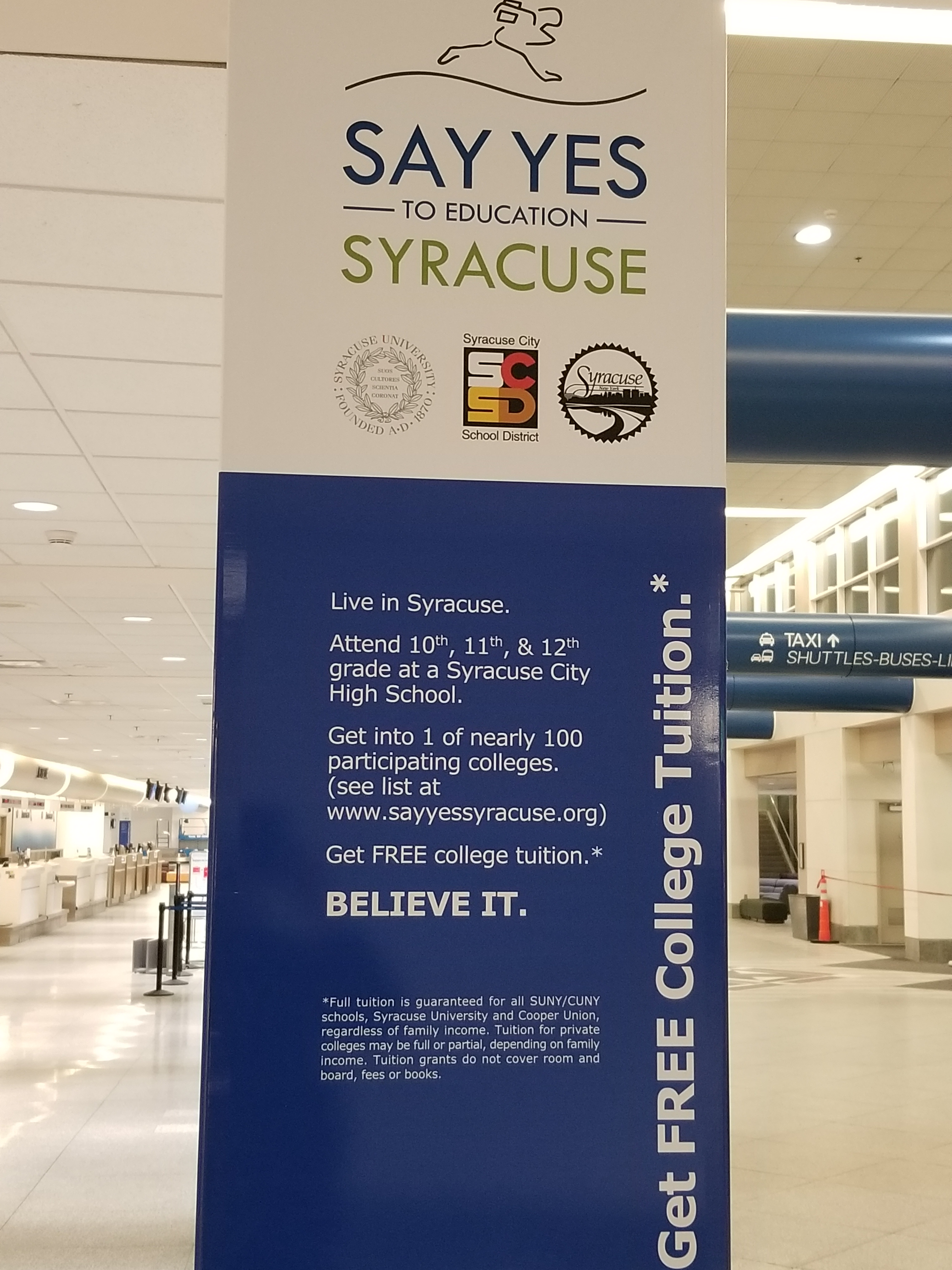
"Say Yes to Education" signage, Syracuse Airport

The Syracuse Say Yes to Education and Economic Development program is a district-wide collaboration between Say Yes, Syracuse University, and the Syracuse City School District aimed at bridging the achievement gap between urban and suburban children by focusing on academic, social-emotional, health, and financial obstacles facing low-income students. The following support systems are offered through the Syracuse Say Yes to Education program: annual and regularly reviewed individual student growth plans; tutoring; identification of strengths and weaknesses through student diagnostic testing; inclusive settings, curriculum, and support for students with disabilities and English language learners; after-school and summer school programs; counseling and family engagement; research-based academic programs such as International Baccalaureate often found in suburban schools; financial aid and college selection counseling; and mentoring.

The Syracuse Higher Education Compact is a partnership between private and public institutions to "collectively provide the opportunity for Say Yes graduates in the city of Syracuse to attend college with tuition, fees, and books paid for." As of February 2018, more than 100 colleges and universities were promising Syracuse City School District students free college tuition.

== Bibliography ==
- Smith, Edward. 1893. A History of the Schools of Syracuse from its Early Settlement to January 1, 1893. Syracuse: C.W. Bardeen, p. 330. Available at Google Books
- Hope and Despair in the American City - Which compares the schools in Syracuse to those of the Wake County Public School System of Raleigh, North Carolina
