= Hudson Subdivision =

Rail line in New York state

Amtrak Hudson Line

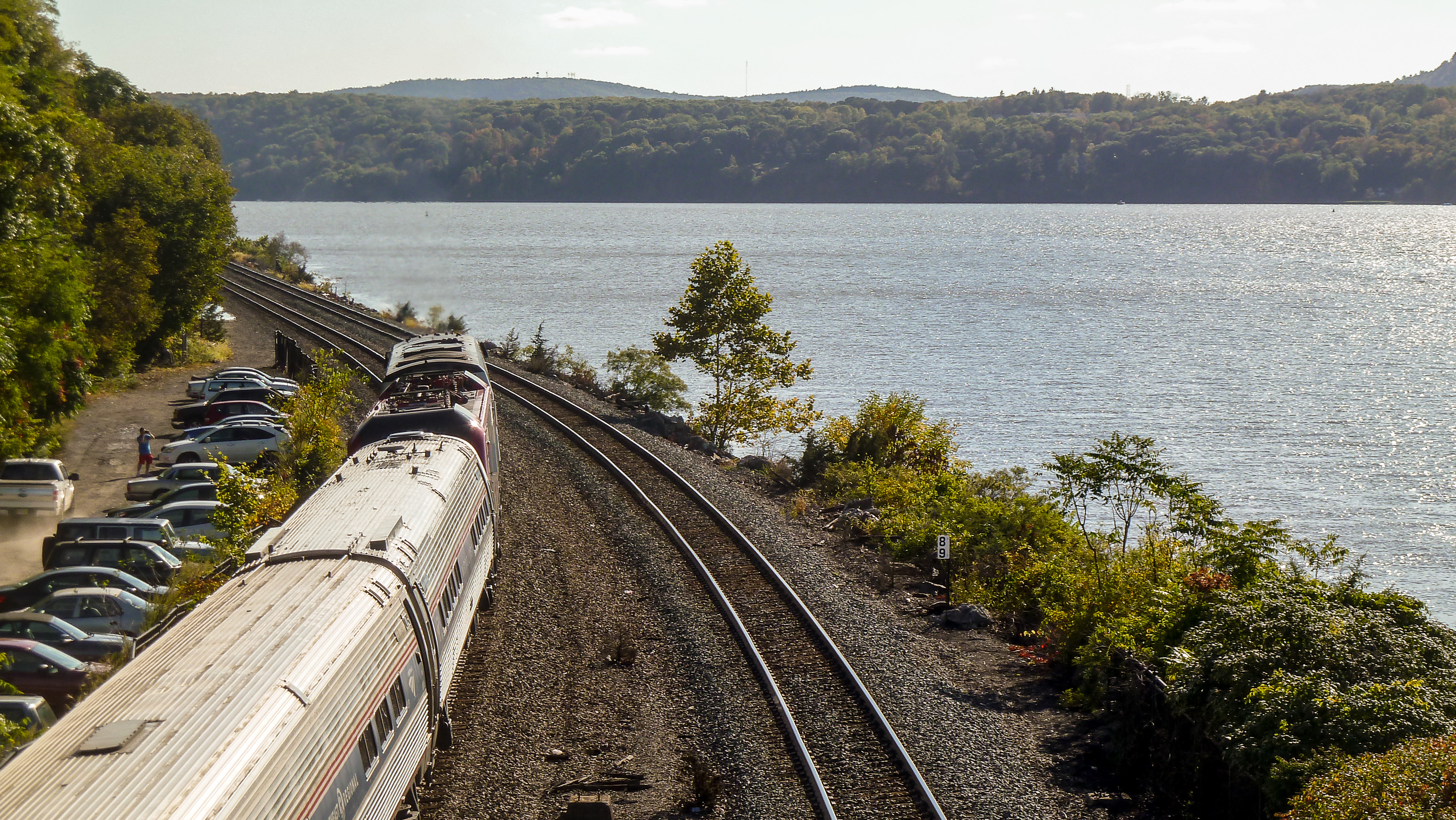
- An Amtrak train near Rhinecliff station in 2017

Overview
- Other name: CSX Hudson Subdivision
- Owner: CSX Transportation
- Locale: Upstate New York
- Termini: Poughkeepsie; Schenectady
- Stations: 5

Service
- System: Amtrak/CSX Transportation
- Services: 6
- Operator(s): Amtrak

Technical
- Line length: 104.6 mi (168.3 km)
- Number of tracks: 1-2
- Character: At-grade
- Track gauge: 4 ft 8 1/2 in (1,435 mm) standard gauge
- Operating speed: 110 mph (180 km/h)
- Signalling: Cab signalling

The Amtrak Hudson Line, also known as the CSX Hudson Subdivision, is a railroad line owned by CSX Transportation and leased by Amtrak in the U.S. state of New York. The line runs from Poughkeepsie north along the east shore of the Hudson River to Rensselaer and northwest to Hoffmans via Albany and Schenectady along a former New York Central Railroad line. From its south end, CSX has trackage rights south to New York City along the Metro-North Railroad's Hudson Line. The Hudson Line junctions the Castleton Subdivision in Stuyvesant, Amtrak's Post Road Branch in Rensselaer and the Carman Subdivision in Schenectady. Its northwest end is at a merge with the Mohawk Subdivision. The entirety of the line overlaps with the Empire Corridor, one of Amtrak and the Federal Railroad Administration's candidate lines for future high-speed rail.

== History ==
The Mohawk and Hudson Railroad opened a line from Albany to Schenectady in 1831. The Utica and Schenectady Railroad opened from Schenectady west to Utica in 1836, including the present Hudson Subdivision west of Schenectady. On the east side of the Hudson River, the Hudson River Railroad opened from New York City north to Rensselaer in 1851. The original Hudson River crossing was the Hudson River Bridge, but the Livingston Avenue Bridge, the current crossing, opened in 1902. The entire line became part of the New York Central, later Penn Central, and finally Conrail, through leases, mergers, and takeovers. The line was then assigned to CSX in the 1999 breakup of Conrail.

In September 2011, Amtrak and CSX reached a long-term operating and lease agreement for the Hudson Line, the CSX-owned segment of the Hudson Subdivision between Poughkeepsie and Schenectady. The agreement, which took effect on December 1, 2012, granted Amtrak the exclusive right to operate passenger service on the line, while CSX retained exclusive freight rights. Under the lease, Amtrak assumed responsibility for managing, dispatching, and controlling all train movements and railroad operations on the Hudson Line, as well as performing maintenance and capital improvements.

== Services ==
=== Current service ===
As a segment of the Empire Corridor, the Hudson Line carries six Amtrak routes. The Empire Service, Berkshire Flyer, Lake Shore Limited, and Maple Leaf operate over the entire Hudson Line, while the Adirondack and Ethan Allen Express operate over all except for the small portion northwest of the Delaware and Hudson Railway junction in Schenectady. The trackage west of that junction to Hoffmans is owned by Amtrak and used by CSX via trackage rights.

The Hudson Line has four active stations: Schenectady, Albany–Rensselaer, Hudson, and Rhinecliff. Schenectady is served by five Amtrak services, while Albany-Rensselaer are served by all six Amtrak services, while Hudson is bypassed only by the Lake Shore Limited. Poughkeepsie station is also part of the Amtrak Hudson Line, although Metro-North owns trackage up to a point 2 miles (3.2 km) north of the station.

==== Passenger service rights under the 2011 lease ====
In 2011, Amtrak assumed operational control of the Hudson Line between Poughkeepsie and Schenectady, including responsibility for maintenance, dispatching, and capital improvements.

Although the lease between CSX and Amtrak describes Amtrak’s passenger rights as “exclusive,” other passenger operators, including commuter rail agencies, could operate on the line if they negotiate separate access agreements and comply with applicable regulatory requirements. If Amtrak chose not to grant access to other passenger operators, those operators could potentially seek trackage rights through the Surface Transportation Board under federal law.

=== Former service ===
Service on the line was originally established as the Hudson River Railroad in 1846, opened to Rensselaer in 1851, and later became part of the New York Central Railroad. Commuter service was always concentrated south of Poughkeepsie: by 1940, only three daily round trips – none of them timed for commuting to New York City – made local stops between Albany and Poughkeepsie. By 1960, only a single daily round trip (timed for commuting to Albany) made local stops. It was cut to a Hudson–Albany round trip with four intermediate stops by 1964, and discontinued around 1965; some intercity trains continued to stop at Rhinecliff and Hudson. The New York Central merged into Penn Central in 1968, which in turn became Conrail in 1976. Amtrak took over intercity passenger service from Penn Central in 1971.

== Stations ==
HD refers to the Hudson Division, the New York Central (and later Conrail) line that preceded Metro-North's Hudson Line.

Location	Station	Line services						Connections
Location	Station	ES	ML	LS	AD	EA	HD	Connections
Poughkeepsie	Poughkeepsie	●	●	●	●	●	●	Metro-North Railroad: Hudson Line; City of Poughkeepsie Transit: Main Street; Dutchess County LOOP: A, B, C, D, E, Poughkeepsie Commuter Connection
Hyde Park	Hyde Park						●	
Staatsburg	Staatsburgh						●	
Rhinecliff	Rhinecliff	●	●	●	●	●	●	
Barrytown	Barrytown						●	
Tivoli	Tivoli						●	
Germantown	Germantown						●	
Livingston	Linlithgo						●	
Greenport	Greendale						●	
Hudson	Hudson	●	●		●	●	●	
Stockport	Stockport						●	
Stuyvesant	Newton Hook						●	
Stuyvesant	Stuyvesant						●	
Schodack Landing	Schodack Landing						●	
Castleton-on-Hudson	Castleton						●	
Rensselaer	Albany–Rensselaer	●	●	●	●	●		Capital District Transportation Authority: NX Northway Express, 114, 214
Albany	Albany Union Station						●	
Schenectady	Schenectady	●	●	●	●	●		Capital District Transportation Authority: 351, 353, 354, 355, 370, 763, 905 BusPlus

== See also ==
- List of CSX Transportation lines
