= Barrytown station =

Barrytown
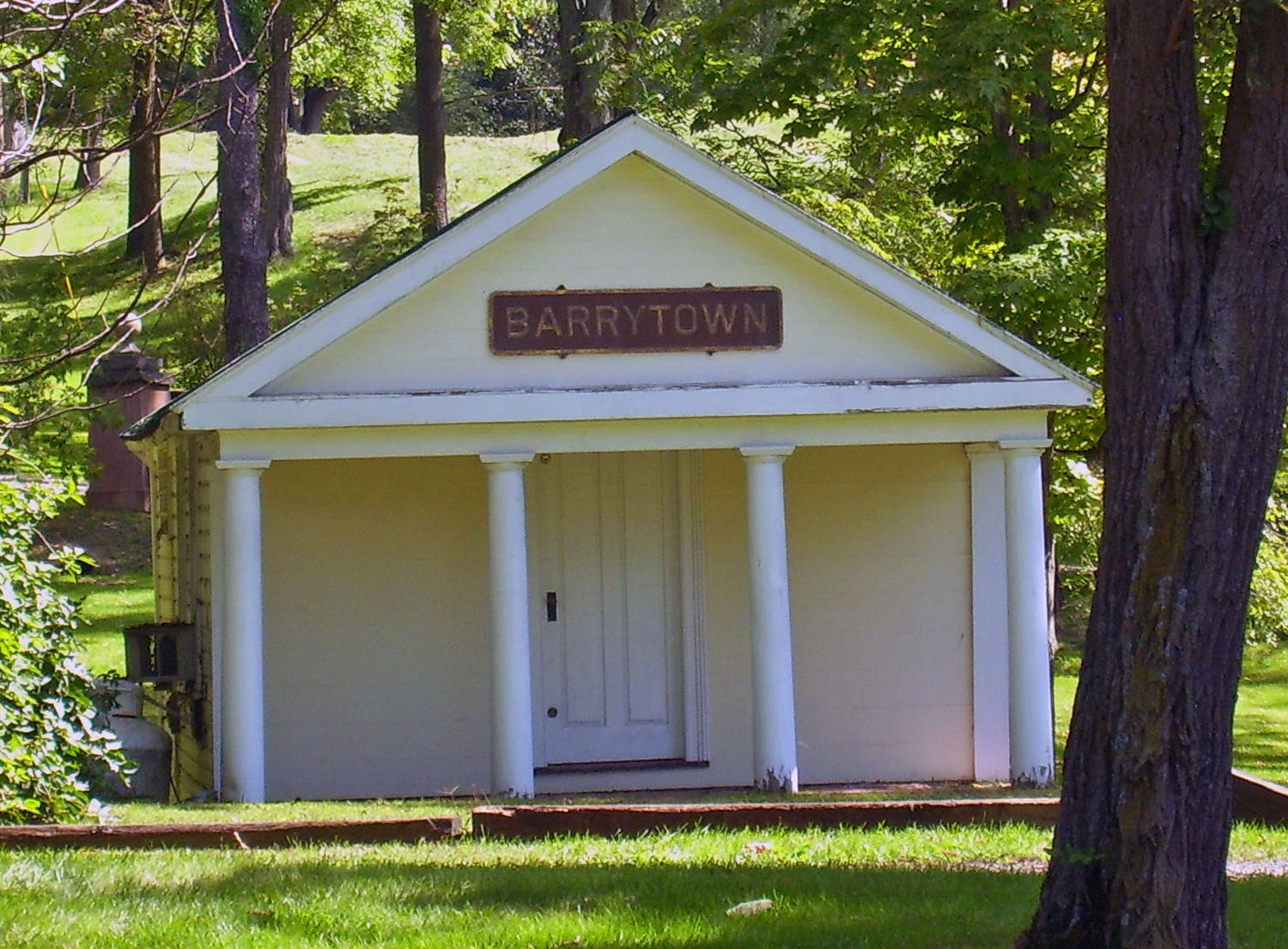
- The former New York Central signage for Barrytown station on a nearby building that once served as a post office and general store.

General information
- Location: 148 Station Hill Road, Barrytown, Red Hook, New York
- Coordinates: 41.999124°N 73.930908°W
- Owner: New York Central Railroad
- Line: NYCRR Water Level Route

History
- Opened: October 1, 1851 (completion); October 8, 1851 (opening ceremony)
- Closed: October 7, 1959

Former services
Preceding station	New York Central Railroad	Following station
Tivoli toward Chicago	Main Line	Rhinecliff toward New York
Location

Barrytown station is a defunct commuter railroad station in the Barrytown section of Red Hook, Dutchess County, New York. Located at the end of Station Hill Road, the station served trains of the New York Central Railroad's main line between Grand Central Terminal in New York City and LaSalle Street Station in Chicago, Illinois. The station served as the local stop for Bard College in nearby Annandale-on-Hudson. Though the station no longer stands, Amtrak operates inter-city rail services through Barrytown as part of the Empire Service from New York Penn Station to Niagara Falls along with five additional services.

Railroad service began on an official basis on October 1, 1851, when the first trains between Tivoli and Poughkeepsie were installed by the Hudson River Railroad. Prior to this, the railroad had operated substitute steamship service from Poughkeepsie and Hudson to make up for the gap in tracks. In September 1920, Warren Delano IV, a local entrepreneur and uncle of Franklin Delano Roosevelt, was killed at Barrytown station in a freak accident involving a show horse and an oncoming express train. With a decline in ridership, the New York Central Railroad filed in June 1959 to have the station closed and passenger service discontinued. The request was approved in September 1959, which also allowed the railroad to demolish the station building. In January 1963, with the railroad attempting to close the station depot at nearby Rhinecliff, locals offered to reopen the Barrytown station to serve as a suitable replacement due to its close proximity to the Kingston–Rhinecliff Bridge, but the New York State Public Service Commission rejected the railroad's request in April.

== History ==
=== Early history (1847–1908) ===
Railroad service along the east bank of the Hudson River started with the charter of the Hudson River Railroad Company in March 1847. Construction of the railroad began that year and the stretch from New York City to Peekskill opened on September 30, 1849. On December 31, 1849, the railroad was extended to Poughkeepsie. However, construction from Poughkeepsie to Albany did not immediately follow. Until the construction of the railroad was finished, the railroad operated two steamships on the Hudson River that made all intended intermediate stops, including Barrytown. The alignment from Poughkeepsie to Albany was built in small sections. The section from Albany to Hudson opened on June 16, 1851; an extension to Oak Hill opened on July 7. This continued to Tivoli on August 3. The railroad alignment from Tivoli to Poughkeepsie, including Barrytown, was finished on October 1, 1851. The Hudson River Railroad opened the full alignment to passenger service on October 8, 1851 to high fanfare.

A plumber's lamp started a fire in Barrytown on May 12, 1908 at the Riverside Hotel. The 100-by-40-foot (30 m × 12 m) wooden frame hotel burned and winds off the Hudson River helped the fire spread to multiple buildings. The American Ice Company ice house was in the route of the embers. It then jumped over to the blacksmith shop operated by the ice firm and a second line went from the hotel stables to other nearby livery stables. Once the fire reached Edward Carr's store and stable, it reached the freight station operated by the New York Central Railroad. Daniel O'Connell, the station agent at Barrytown, and his assistants worked fast to clear out the contents of the building before it caught fire. The freight depot had three carloads of shipments in it, including tobacco worth over $2,000. All of it was moved into freight cars operated in the siding and brought on emergency to Tivoli. A false report in the area stated that O'Connell died in the fire. The freight station was lost in the fire.

The fire kept spreading throughout the western side of Barrytown, taking more buildings down until local steamboats reached Barrytown. The two steamboats, the Jacob H. Tremper from Newburgh and Rob from Kingston, spread lines of hoses from their ships to reduce the fire on the shoreline. The chief engineer of the railroad was notified about the fire and ordered steam trains to help reduce the flames. A nearby steam train was loaded back to Barrytown. A wreck crew on its way to Staatsburg note that company property was in danger and demanded the steamer be sent to Barrytown as soon as possible. They helped the steamships put out the water with their own lines and the railroad's trainmaster sent food and drinks to the firemen. The firemen managed to prevent the passenger station from catching fire in the chaos. In all, 16 buildings in Barrytown burned, causing $78,000 in damage.

=== Death of Warren Delano IV (1920) ===
Warren Delano IV, the uncle of future President of the United States Franklin Delano Roosevelt, attended the Dutchess County Fair in Rhinebeck, New York on September 9, 1920. Delano took his horse, Bell, to the fairgrounds, where he had planned to show them in a horse show. That evening, he took Bell and its buggy towards his estate in Barrytown, Steen Valetje, filled with a trunk that he would have checked for a guest at his residence. Delano made his way back to Barrytown, where he put his horse at the northeast corner of the depot and went to the ticket office to retrieve the check for the trunk. Locals noted that Delano rarely rode his horse to Barrytown station if he knew an express train was coming due to the concern about disturbing his horse. He thought that his business at the depot would be quick enough to not worry about the oncoming express.

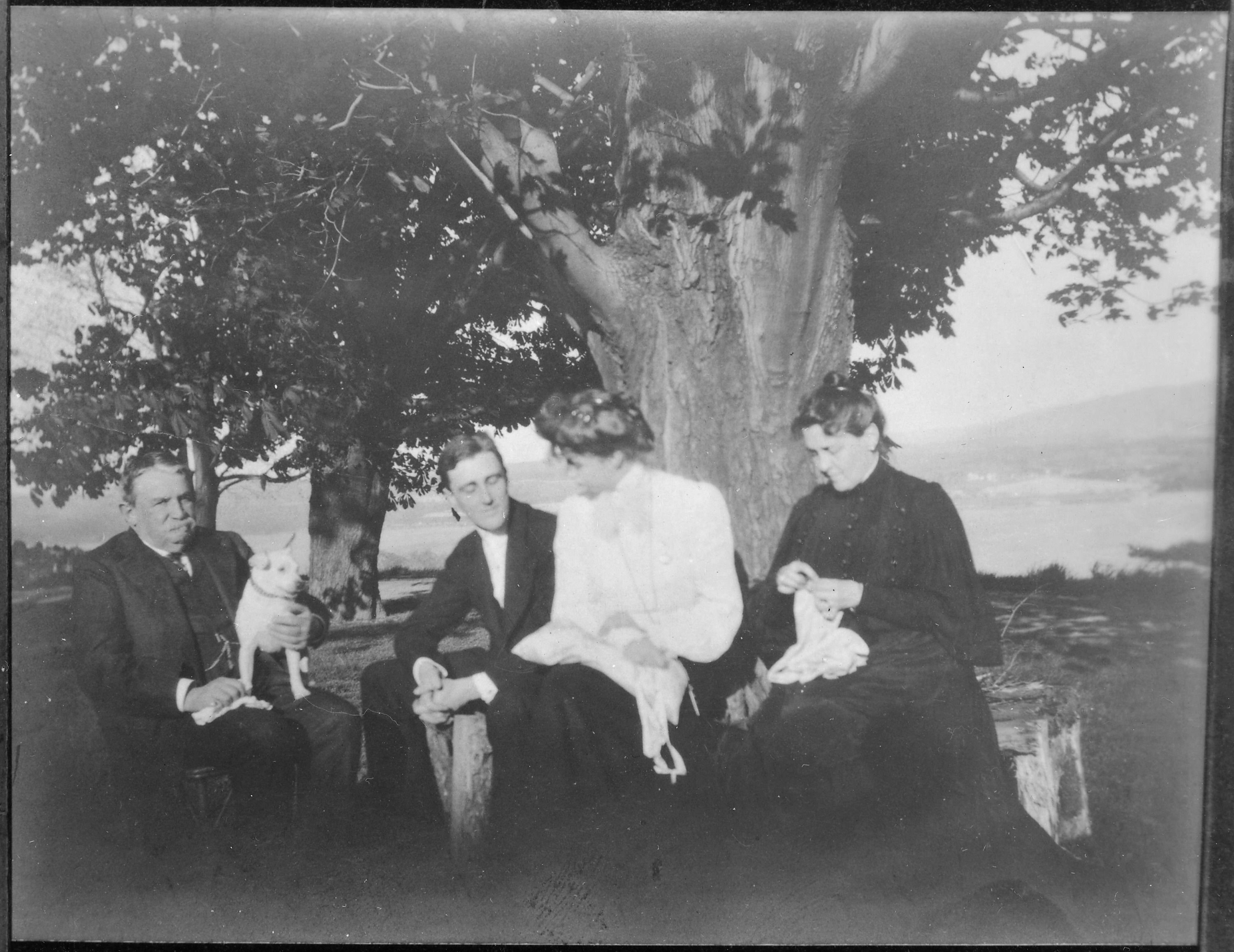
Warren Delano IV and Sara Delano Roosevelt in Newburgh, New York with Franklin Delano and Eleanor Roosevelt in 1905

While in the station's ticket office, Delano heard the whistles of an express train that was coming through Barrytown and peered out the window to check on his horse. Having seen his horse disturbed by the train, Delano left the office and jumped onto his horse's buggy while on the platform. Bell pulled at Delano towards the south end of the platform while Delano tried to control his startled mare. However, the horse moved towards the southeast corner of the platform and jumped on the tracks. The oncoming express train nailed the startled horse and killed it instantly. The speed of the train and its impact resulted in the horse's remains climbing the front of the engineer. Bell's body was carted 1,000 feet (300 m) down the tracks. Delano, who was in the buggy at the time of impact, rode 150 feet (46 m) along the side of the train. He became dislodged from the slowing express train and he was thrown to a nearby concrete abutment at the nearby bridge over the tracks.

When railroad workmen operating in the Barrytown reached Delano, they found him still in his buggy, which was reduced to a seating platform and parts of the seat he had been in. The wheels of the buggy and its running gear were separated from the main structure in the impact. The workmen raced a still-living Delano back to Barrytown station where they threw him on blankets on the floor. Dr. H.F. Cunningham of Red Hook was called for, but Delano died before the doctor arrived at Barrytown station. Cookingham examined the body of Delano, noting that he had suffered from a fractured spine and bleeding from the forehead. The initial examination did not determine if Delano had fractured his skull. The body of Bell, the horse, was buried on the west side of the tracks by the workmen who rescued Delano after the train stopped. The local corner was called and his body was brought to his estate in Barrytown.

The immediate funeral services for Delano were held on September 12, 1920 at his estate in Barrytown. Franklin Delano Roosevelt, then campaigning for the Democratic Party nomination for Vice President of the United States, suspended his campaign activities in New England and traveled to his home in Hyde Park. The private Episcopalian funeral was held there with immediate family. His body was then placed on a train towards Fairhaven, Massachusetts, where the former family homestead was and future services would be held. After the funeral in Barrytown, Franklin Delano Roosevelt returned to campaigning.

=== Grade crossing debates and closure (1954–1959) ===
In 1954, the railroad petitioned the New York State Public Service Commission to close the Station Hill Road grade crossing alongside the Chelsea station in the town of Wappinger. The Station Hill Road crossing, which was operated manually rather than with electric gates, cost the railroad an average of $4,680 between the crossing and the personnel required to operate it. Rather than operate electric gates, the railroad felt it would save money by just barricading the grade crossing in its entirety. The Red Hook Central School Board of Education showed their opposition at the hearing, stating that school buses operated on a loop on Station Hill Road and Dock Road, resulting in the use of the grade crossing and the bridge to the north. If the grade crossing were to be closed, the buses would be unable to operate in the area due to the lack of a sufficient turnaround point for them. On November 15, 1954, the Public Service Commission denied both request, stating that the Chelsea station had sufficient ridership to justify keeping it open and that the grade crossing was already well protected and no accidents had occurred dating back to 1949.

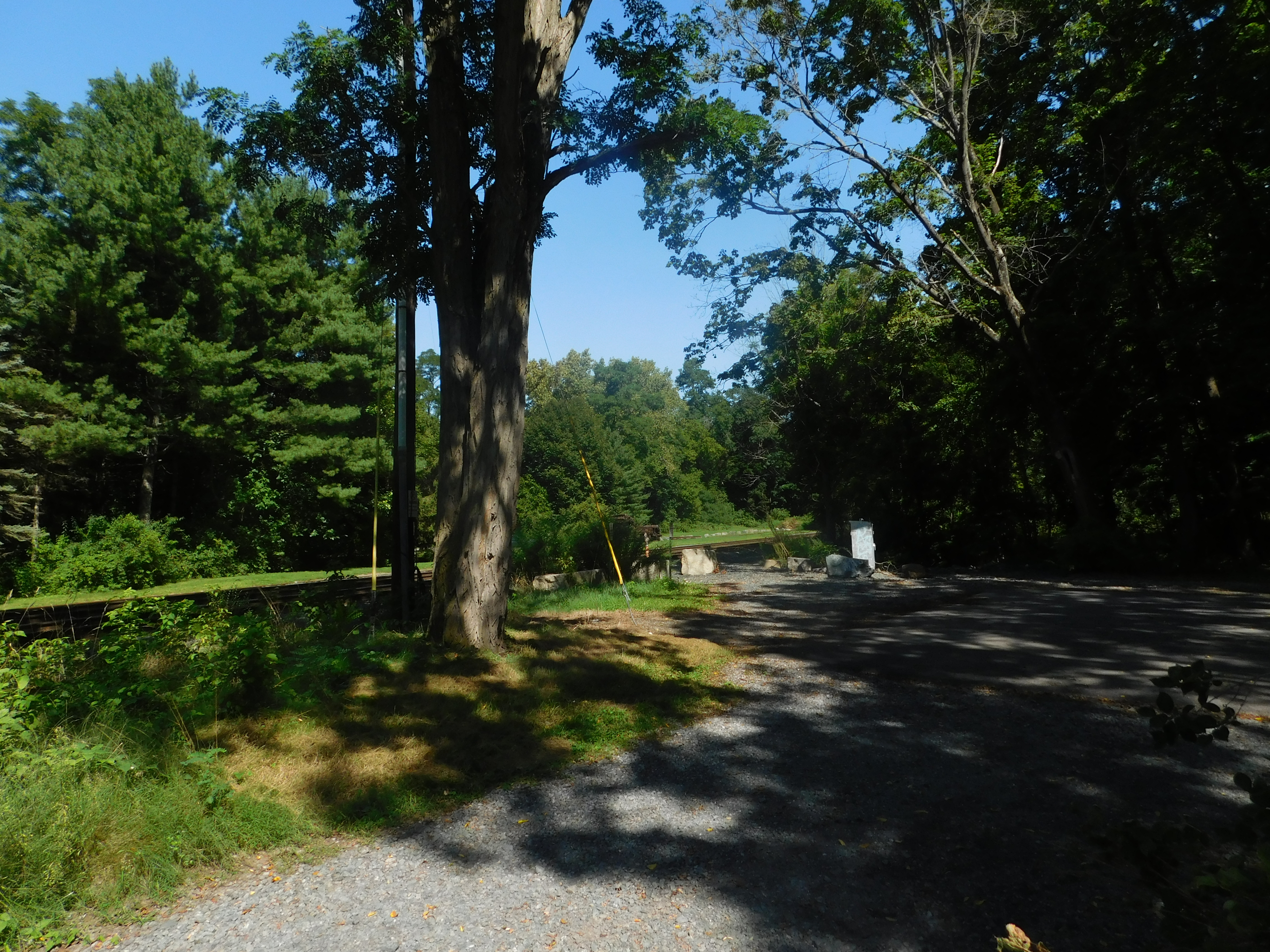
The former grade crossing of Station Hill Road in Barrytown in August 2026, which marked the last manual crossing in Dutchess County

Despite the denied petition, the railroad wasted no time trying again, with a petition in December 1954 that involved offering a new access road that would connect Station Hill Road and Dock Road and eliminate the grade crossing. A hearing was held February 8, 1955 at the Dutchess County Court House in Poughkeepsie in front of Examiner Gerald Knapp. 15 people attended the hearing, including railroad officials and two lawyers representing the town of Red Hook and the Red Hook Central School District. At the hearing, the railroad offered to build am 800-foot (240 m) road on the east side of the tracks that would connect the two streets. This would involve using 100 feet (30 m) of railroad property and 600–700 feet (180–210 m) of private property and cost about $12,500 before the price of property acquisition. With the existing bridge on Dock Road to the north, this new road would make it easier for residents west of the tracks to access Station Hill Road without having to cross the tracks. The three representatives for the railroad stated that it would improve public safety if the new road was built east of the tracks and eliminate the grade crossing. William J. Walsh, one of the attorneys who represented the Red Hook side of the case, stated that he was not opposed to the construction of the road and crossing elimination, but qualified that the bridge on Dock Road must be adequate for the necessary traffic changes. Knapp stated that he would file a report in Albany with the Commission and that they would make a decision.

The Public Service Commission denied the request once again on October 20, 1955. With the town of Red Hook stating that they would not pay for the new road and the railroad stating that problems in land acquisition had come up since the February hearing, the Commission just reaffirmed their opinion from November 1954. The railroad continue to offer that it would offer a new turnaround for buses in return for closing the grade crossing, but it was rejected. Knapp stated in his report that the gates were operated from 6:30 a.m. to 9:45 a.m. with no protection of the crossing in other hours.

On June 16, 1959, the railroad filed a petition with the Public Service Commission to discontinue services of a station agent at Barrytown, along with all passenger train stops. The Commission announced that a hearing would be held at the Dutchess County Court House in Poughkeepsie on July 10, but relocated the hearing to the Red Hook Central School. The hearing, conducted by the Commission's Examiner Albert A. Vallone, had twenty people in attendance between railroad officials and opposition parties. At the hearing, the railroad stated that Barrytown station had less than one person on average daily board their two trains that made stops. The operating costs for the station in 1958 were $10,500, which was five times the amount of annual revenues from freights, $2,100. No decision was made on Barrytown station and the matter was moved to consultation by the Commission.

The Public Service Commission announced on September 18, 1959 that they had approved the railroad's request to discontinue all passenger service and agent services at Barrytown station. They were also given permission to demolish the station depot. However, the New York Central Railroad would be required to maintain freight service at Barrytown and offer services for local areas, including Bard College in Annandale-on-Hudson, Tivoli and Red Hook on its sidings. While Barrytown station would still offer freight on its sidings, the work would be handled by the freight agent at Hudson station in Columbia County. The railroad would also have to produce a traveling freight representative whenever an interested firm wanted to provide service at Barrytown. This person would also work out of Hudson station.

The railroad ceased passenger service at Barrytown on October 7, 1959. The next day, workers began upgrading the manual gates that operated the Station Hill Road grade crossing into automatic electric gates. The final remaining manual grade crossing gates in Dutchess County, the gates were located 30 feet (9.1 m) from the station platform, where a lever existed for workers to raise and lower the gates as necessary. At that time, the crossing had low traffic, but school buses looped on Station Road and Station Hill Road via a bridge and the grade crossing.

=== Rhinecliff station and proposed reopening (1962–1963) ===
In late November 1962, the railroad requested approval from the New York State Public Service Commission to discontinue railroad agent services and demolish the depot at Rhinecliff station. It had not been the first time the railroad worked to reduce service at Rhinecliff station, with the Public Service Commission hosting a hearing on October 6, 1960 over plans to reduce the hours from 7:45 a.m. to 4:45 p.m. The railroad was ordered on December 1, 1960 to keep the station open until 9:30 p.m., a truncation from the previous 10:40 p.m. closure time. A public hearing had been scheduled for December 13, 1962 for the new proposal, to be held at the firehouse in Rhinebeck.

Angst in response was immediate. The Rhinebeck town supervisor, Milton H. Houl, and other civic leaders noted their displeasure to the press on November 22. The supervisor explained that the Rhinecliff station served multiple major facilities in the area, including Bard College in Annandale-on-Hudson and the Cardinal Farley Military Academy in Rhinebeck, along with other private schools and camps in the area. Discontinuation of the station would mean alternate transportation would have to be provided to either the station in Poughkeepsie to the south or Hudson to the north. Moul added that people from nearby Kingston in Ulster County used the station as well. Moul also stated that he would write the Public Service Commission to have the hearing moved from the Rhinebeck firehouse due to a limited capacity in comparison to expected turnout.

Groups such as the Rhinebeck Chamber of Commerce and the Rhinebeck Rotary Club also voiced their opinions in opposition to the railroad's request. The Red Hook Chamber of Commerce also added their opposition, noting that many Red Hook residents used the station, and vowed to appear at the hearing on December 13. On November 23, Mayor John Jacob Schwenk of Kingston joined opposition to the closure of Rhinecliff station and stated that he would attend the hearing or would send someone in lieu if he could not. Albert Kurdt, the executive secretary of the Kingston Chamber of Commerce planned a survey on how much demand and supply there was at Rhinecliff station. Kurdt added that he knew local travel agencies booked trips to Kingston from the Rhinecliff station and that they would get public reaction from locals before determining whether or not to join the fight with its fellow chambers.

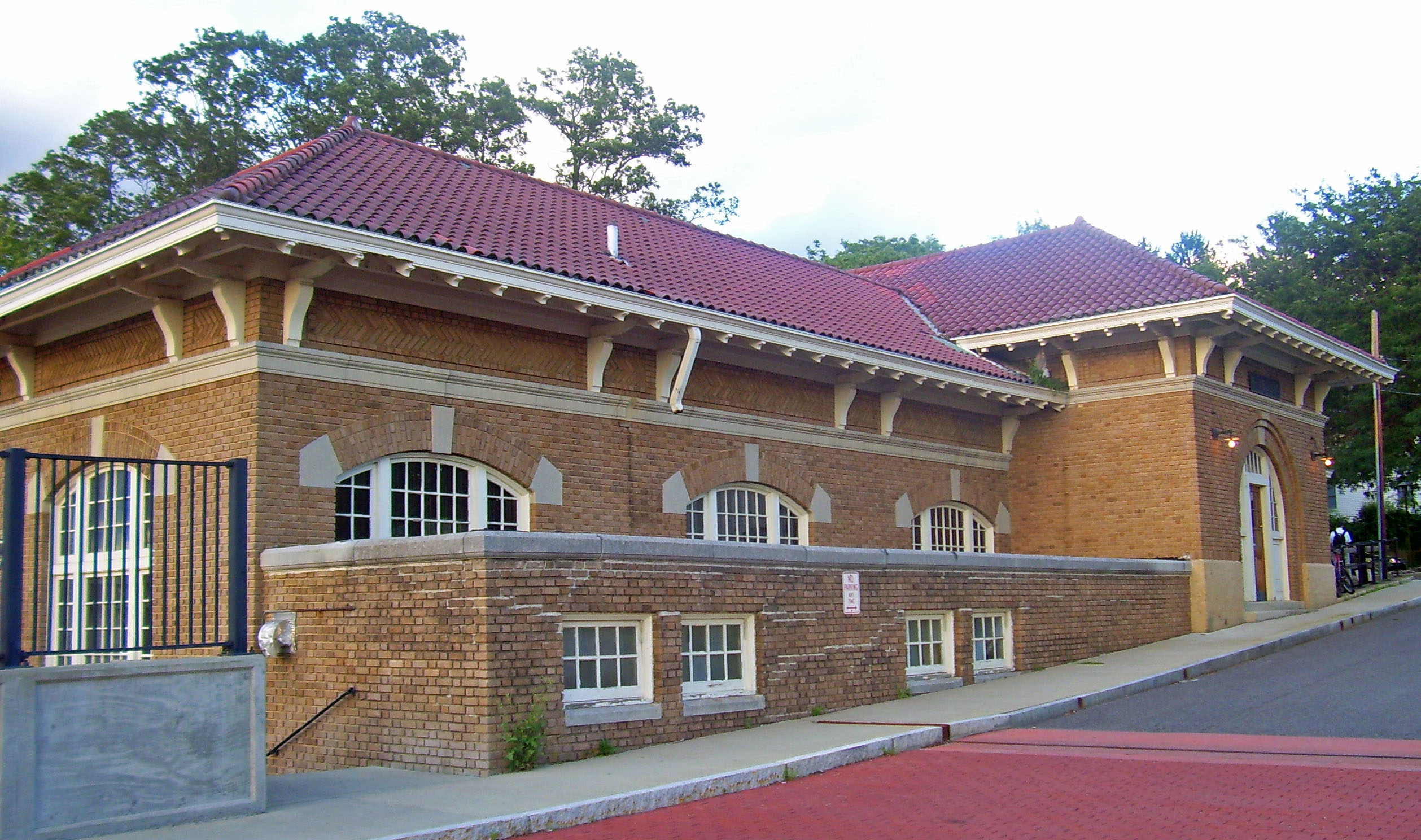
The Rhinecliff station depot in 2007, the source of the controversial closure attempt in 1962 and 1963

However, the Public Service Commission deferred the hearing at the end of November to an unspecified date in January 1963. The Commission's assistant public relations officer, Robert Shillinglaw, noted that the attorney for the railroad would be unable to attend the hearing on December 13. Shillinglaw added that the railroad's intent was to not discontinue passenger train service at Rhinecliff in its entirety. However, they noted that if the Commission approved, it normally meant that the railroad would demolish the station, eliminate the agent and provide a three-sided station shelter in its place. The railroad's petition was also made public, stating that the operating costs of Rhinecliff station had grown while freight and passenger use had been on the decline. Rhinecliff station's passenger service revenue had been $67,078.83 in 1959 and dropped to $58,455.34 in 1960. However, the petition noted that the passenger revenue in 1961 had gone up to $62,677. Freight shipments had been in continual decline from 1959 to 1961, running from $7,309.58 in 1959 to $4,544.76 in 1961. Meanwhile, the cost of operating the station had grown from $24,548.51 in 1959 to $28,105.93 in 1961. No data was provided for 1962 revenues and operating costs. The railroad requested that the station depot at Rhinecliff be abandoned and replaced with a shelter. No trains would be cut from Rhinecliff service and the railroad would provide an agent at the station during some hours to give tickets and deal with freight operations. On December 1, Moul stated that the Public Service Commission had moved the hearing to January 22, 1963 and from the Rhinebeck firehouse to Rhinebeck Town Hall. While Moul was happy that the hearing location had been moved, he stated that even if the railroad still operated all train stops at Rhinecliff station, he was still opposed the closing of the depot as the railroad sought.

Chanler Chapman, a local farmer in Barrytown, offered a new proposal in response to the Rhinecliff petition, reopening the Barrytown station. The Red Hook Rotary Club and its president, Reverend Leonard F. Neils Jr., held a meeting on January 8, 1963, where they adopted a resolution to push the New York Central Railroad to reopen Barrytown station in response to the Rhineciliff petition. A new committee of residents who lived in the area of Rhinecliff station was formed within a week, to help provide a voice for local residents that would be affected by the station being demolished. This committee, which included Edison L. Smith, a local justice of the peace, Dr. Reamer Kline, the president of Bard College, Brother Andrew of St. Joseph's Institute in Barrytown, Lloyd Haperman of a local bank, and attorney William J. Walsh of Red Hook. The committee agreed with the Red Hook Rotary Club, stating that if Rhinecliff station were abandoned, it would be in the best interest of locals to have the Barrytown station reopened. The committee stated that the Barrytown station site provided some benefits to locals in comparison to the Rhinecliff stop. Barrytown station was equidistant from Poughkeepsie and Hudson and unlike Rhinecliff station, was at track level. Rhinecliff station required the use of stairs to reach the platform. With the station's closer proximity to the Kingston–Rhinecliff Bridge, it would also be easier for Kingston residents to reach the train.

Moul made a final appeal to local residents on January 19, 1963. He stated that he was in favor of reopening Barrytown station over keeping Rhinecliff station. However, Moul's cynicism stated that the railroad would probably close the station within two years and the situation of having no stop between Poughkeepsie and Hudson would come true. Despite his cynicism, Moul pressured for unity in opposing the railroad's petition. At the hearing, Leonard Zneimer of the Rhinebeck Country School, who was the chair of a committee from the Rhinebeck Rotary Club to prevent the station closure, voiced his opposition, calling the proposed Barrytown station reopening a poorly timed decision that should be held off from the January 22 hearing. Zneimer noted the station shelter at Tivoli had become a "haven for tramps" and that efforts should be put towards keeping the Rhinecliff station depot open. Zneimer added that the Rhinebeck Board of Assessors agreed with the railroad that if the station was retained, they would consider reducing the tax assessment of their property.

Edison L. Smith stated that if the Barrytown station question was brought up at the hearing, it would not be offered in opposition to keeping Rhinecliff station open. Smith state that they planned to work together on the offerings at the hearing. Smith's committee also gained the support of Howland Shippen Davis, the chair of the Taconic State Park Commission and resident of Tivoli. Smith stated that if the Rhinecliff station was not retained, that the new Barrytown station should be a full facility. A new station would have agent facilities and an elevator to get down from the cliffs nearby.

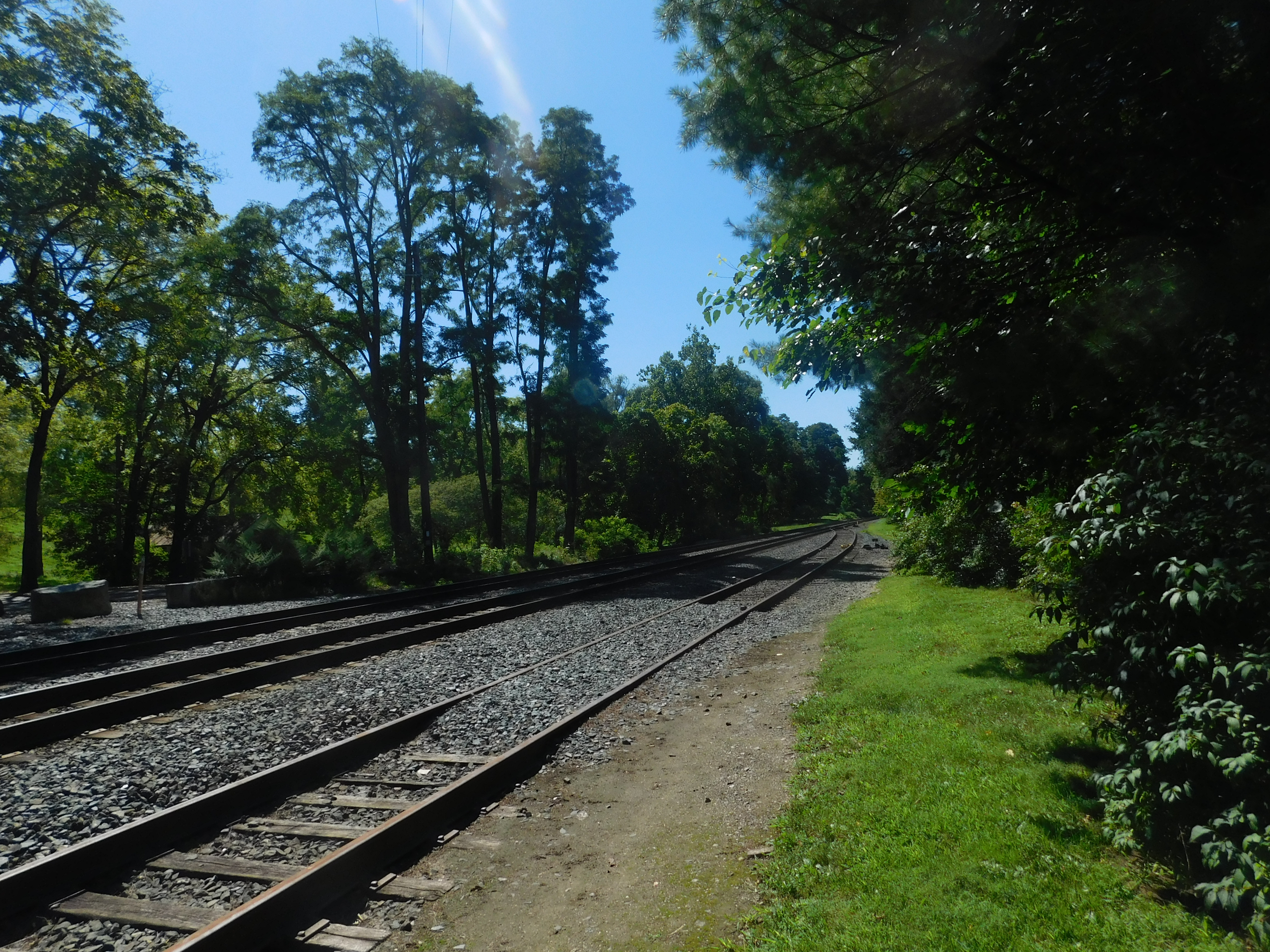
Barrytown station site in August 2026

At the January 22 hearing, the railroad reiterated its case about saving money by abandoning the station depot and opening a shelter for passengers. Moul, Chapman, Zneimer and Schwenk were present and spoke after the railroad, along with Silas Fraser, the attorney for the town of Rhinebeck and Horace Kulp, the supervisor for the town of Clinton. Chapman reiterated his interest in reopening Barrytown station. He added that if they reduced service at Rhinecliff, it would be better to put the shelter at Barrytown instead. James Kelly of the Cardinal Farley Military Academy stated that 50 students used Rhinecliff station to go other places and relatives of students also used the station to visit the academy. Charles Knauss of the Modern Manufacturing Company in Staatsburg stated that cutting the station would be a detriment to the economy of the area. James Loftus, the treasurer for the Rhinecliff Chamber of Commerce, added that a shelter would be a hangout place for teenagers drinking, much like the Tivoli station. William Dennis of Red Hook, a local attorney, questioned the stationmaster at Poughkeepsie station about the plans for a new shelter. The stationmaster responded by saying that the railroad would sell the station and land at the right place. Dennis stated that he felt the railroad was withholding facts at the meeting. Dennis stated that the railroad would like end all railroad service with an unattended station.

After the hearing, the Public Service Commission took time to consider the results of the hearing. On March 30, they stated that a decision would be coming soon on the petition. The Public Service Commission issued their order on April 10, 1963. The Commission continued their 1960 order and stated the railroad could not close Rhinecliff station and replace it with a shelter. The railroad would have to keep the waiting room open and at the same hours (5:40 a.m.–9:40 p.m.) and be kept under supervision of a station agent and railroad personnel. The commission stated that the railroad would be allowed to move freight services to Hudson on the condition tht existing freight could be handled by truck. Telephone calls by Rhinecliff area freight operators would need to be dealt with by a traveling representative of the railroad. Jacob Rothstein, an examiner for the railroad, stated in his report to the commission that there would be no place to build a shelter with the limited platform space at Rhinecliff station. Rothstein added that if freight service was moved to Hudson, the freight service at Staatsburg station would also move to Hudson as the Rhinecliff agent was serving in that role.
