= Post Road Branch =

Rail line in New York State, U.S.

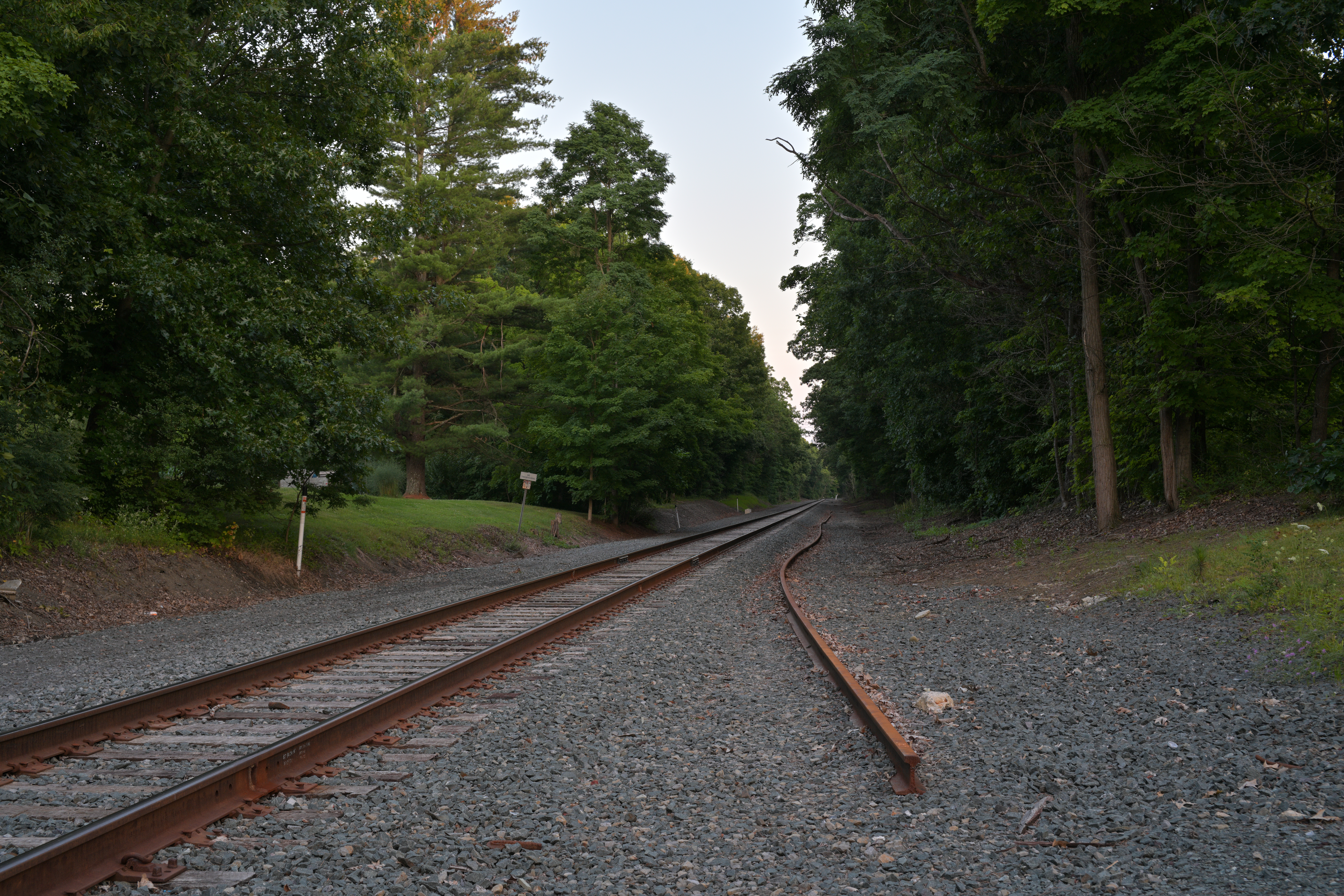
- The Post Road Branch in East Greenbush, New York

Overview
- Other name: Post Road Subdivision
- Status: Operational
- Owner: Amtrak
- Locale: Capital District
- Termini: Amtrak Hudson Line; Berkshire Subdivision

Service
- System: Amtrak; CSX Transportation
- Services: Berkshire Flyer, Lake Shore Limited

History
- Opened: 1842

Technical
- Line length: 12.0 miles (19.3 km)
- Number of tracks: 1
- Character: At-grade
- Track gauge: 4 ft 8 1/2 in (1,435 mm) standard gauge
- Operating speed: 79 miles per hour (127 km/h)

The Post Road Branch is a railroad line owned and operated by Amtrak in the U.S. state of New York. The line runs from a junction with CSX Transportation's Berkshire Subdivision in Castleton-on-Hudson, New York, northwest to CSX's Hudson Subdivision at Rensselaer, New York (near Albany), along a former New York Central Railroad line. Freight service is provided by CSX Transportation, who calls it the Post Road Subdivision, via trackage rights.

The Boston branch of Amtrak's long-distance Lake Shore Limited operates over the Post Road Branch, as does the seasonal Berkshire Flyer.

== History ==
The Albany and West Stockbridge Railroad opened the line in 1842 as part of a line between Boston and Albany. The line became part of the Boston and Albany Railroad and New York Central Railroad through leases and mergers. With the opening of the Hudson River Connecting Railroad in 1924, it became a minor branch, with through freight using the new Alfred H. Smith Memorial Bridge around Albany. On April 30, 1972, Penn Central Transportation removed the track on the Post Road Branch, forcing passenger trains to make a reverse movement along the current Schodack Subdivision. The abandoned line was assigned to Amtrak in the 1976 formation of Conrail, and Amtrak reopened it on October 28, 1979, with Conrail trackage rights for freight. These rights were assigned to CSX Transportation in the 1999 breakup of Conrail.

A sinkhole under the tracks in East Greenbush was discovered in May 2025, causing the Berkshire Flyer and Lake Shore Limited to be replaced with buses east of Albany. Service on the line was originally estimated to be restored by January 2026. Service resumed on December 1, 2025.

== See also ==
- List of CSX Transportation lines
