= Berkshire Flyer =

Amtrak passenger train

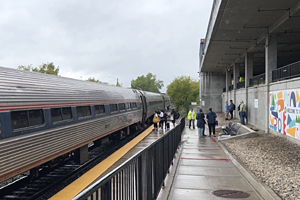
- The Berkshire Flyer at Pittsfield in September 2022

Overview
- Service type: Inter-city rail
- Status: Pilot, seasonal
- Locale: Hudson Valley and Berkshires
- First service: July 8, 2022
- Current operator: Amtrak
- Annual ridership: 826 (FY 24) (Note: Only includes ridership on the Albany/Rensselaer–Pittsfield segment.) ▼ -31.7% (Note: Amtrak's Fiscal Year (FY) runs from October 1 of the prior year to September 30 of the named year.)
- Website: amtrak.com/berkshire-flyer

Route
- Termini: New York City, New York; Pittsfield, Massachusetts
- Distance travelled: 190 miles (306 km)
- Average journey time: 4 hours
- Service frequency: Two roundtrips weekly
- Train number: 1233, 1235, 1246

Technical
- Rolling stock: Amfleet coaches
- Track gauge: 4 ft 8 1/2 in (1,435 mm) standard gauge
- Track owners: MNRR, Amtrak, CSX

The Berkshire Flyer is a seasonal Amtrak passenger train service between New York City and the Berkshire Mountains in Pittsfield, Massachusetts, via the Hudson Valley. As of the 2026 season, the weekly train completes two round-trips between Penn Station and Pittsfield, one each on Fridays and Sundays (Mondays on holiday weekends).

== History ==
=== Development ===
In 2014, Massachusetts proposed moving ahead with plans for commuter rail service between the Berkshires and New York City. Eight round trips per day would have followed the Housatonic Railroad from Pittsfield through Connecticut to Southeast, New York, where they would have taken the Harlem Line to Grand Central Terminal. Four stops were proposed in Berkshire County: Pittsfield, Lee, Great Barrington, and Sheffield. The commuter rail project failed to progress due to lack of interest from the administration of Connecticut Governor Dannel Malloy.

In 2017, the Massachusetts legislature began new efforts toward a summer tourist train, not commuter rail, between New York City and the Berkshires. Eddie Sporn, a Berkshire-based consultant, was researching the topic of restoring passenger rail service and sent an outline of plans to State Senator Adam Hinds. The plan for the "Berkshire Flyer" was modeled on the CapeFLYER, a popular seasonal train between Boston and Cape Cod. The proposal routed the train on the Empire Corridor through New York State rather than Connecticut. In September the legislature empaneled a working group consisting of MassDOT representatives, government officials, business leaders, and involved citizens to work on the project.

MassDOT released a Berkshire Flyer feasibility study in March 2018 in which three alternatives were studied. The first option (which was ultimately selected) was to extend an Empire Service round trip from Albany–Rensselaer to Pittsfield. The second option would have added a new limited-stop express train on this route, saving 10 to 12 minutes. The third would have added a new train that skipped Albany–Rensselaer by traversing the Schodack Subdivision, cutting 18 miles (29 km) and saving 20 minutes. NYSDOT stated it would not support a service that did not stop at all Empire Corridor stations. The report also raised the possibility of a new Amtrak station in Chatham, New York, but this was not evaluated due to its large capital costs.

In May 2018, the Massachusetts Senate approved funds for a two-year trial of the Berkshire Flyer. The service would be a seasonal extension of a weekend Empire Service round trip to Pittsfield.

=== Pilot ===
The service pilot was originally scheduled to begin in June 2020, but was delayed due to the COVID-19 pandemic and questions around the program's legal sponsorship. It was rescheduled to take place in summer 2022 and 2023, and was later expanded to a third year, 2024.

In April 2022, Amtrak announced that the first trip would depart on July 8. Tickets went up for sale on May 25, starting at $45 one way. Service began as announced on July 8, 2022, with train 1235 departing on-time from Penn Station. Several local and state officials were aboard the first train, while others greeted it in Pittsfield. The season ended with a southbound trip on September 5, running on Labor Day instead of Sunday.

The 2022 season saw nine total Berkshire Flyer round trips, carrying 401 passengers northbound to Pittsfield and 418 riders southbound. Feedback on the route was positive, though many passengers desired the option to spend more time in Pittsfield, saying the limited schedule was inconvenient. Supporters hoped the schedule could be expanded for the 2023 season.

In April 2023, MassDOT announced the Berkshire Flyer's second season would run from Memorial Day weekend to Columbus Day weekend. The first northbound train departed on May 26, and the last southbound train was scheduled for October 8. Twenty total round trips were scheduled, more than double that of 2022.

In 2023, MassDOT indicated that the pilot would be funded for a third season (summer 2024) in order to make up for the late start and minimal marketing of the 2022 season. This required a new agreement with track-owner CSX, who desired the construction of a passing siding at Joseph Scelsi Intermodal Transportation Center. The 2024 season operated from June 21 to September 2, 2024, with a Sunday northbound trip added. MassDOT indicated that connecting bus service (possibly Amtrak Thruway) between Albany–Rensselaer and Pittsfield would be considered added after the Berkshire Flyer season ended.

A sinkhole under the Post Road Branch tracks in East Greenbush was discovered in May 2025, causing the Berkshire Flyer and Lake Shore Limited to be replaced with buses east of Albany. As of July 2025, service on the line is expected to resume in January 2026.

In May 2026, a new schedule for the 2026 season was announced, which included an additional southbound trip on Fridays, marking the first time that two weekly round-trips will be available.

In October 2026, MassDOT and CSX announced an agreement for infrastructure improvements to make the Berkshire Flyer a permanent service. These improvements include a new siding in Pittsfield and other track improvements.

== Service ==
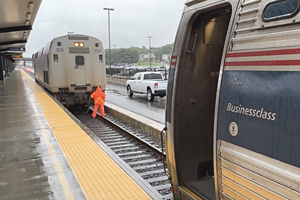
A P42DC locomotive, only used on the Pittsfield leg, being removed from the train at Albany–Rensselaer

As of 2026, the Berkshire Flyer completes two weekly round trips between New York and Pittsfield, one on Friday and one on Sunday. Intermediate stops are made in both directions at Empire Service stations. In Pittsfield, passengers are welcomed by "ambassadors" who provide information and assist in wayfinding.

== Route details ==
The Berkshire Flyer operates over CSX Transportation, Metro-North Railroad, and Amtrak trackage:

- CSX Berkshire Subdivision: Pittsfield to Schodack, New York
- Amtrak Post Road Branch: Schodack to Rensselaer
- CSX Hudson Subdivision: Rensselaer to Poughkeepsie (leased to Amtrak)
- Metro-North Railroad Hudson Line: Poughkeepsie to Spuyten Duyvil
- Amtrak Empire Connection: Spuyten Duyvil to New York Penn Station

Though the Berkshire Flyer is the first and only Amtrak train to offer a direct ride between New York City and Pittsfield without layovers, all sections of the route are served by other Amtrak trains. The line between New York City and Rensselaer is part of Amtrak's Empire Corridor, while service between Rensselaer and Pittsfield is provided by the Lake Shore Limited.

== Stations ==
State	Location	Mile (km)	Station	Connections
Massachusetts	Pittsfield	190 (310)	Joseph Scelsi Intermodal Transportation Center	Amtrak: Lake Shore Limited; BRTA: 1, 2, 4, 5A, 5B, 11, 12, 14, 15, 21, 921; Peter Pan Bus
New York	Rensselaer	141 (227)	Albany–Rensselaer	Amtrak: Adirondack, Empire Service, Ethan Allen Express, Lake Shore Limited, Maple Leaf; CDTA: 114, 214
New York	Hudson	114 (183)	Hudson	Amtrak: Adirondack, Empire Service, Ethan Allen Express, Maple Leaf
New York	Rhinecliff	100 (160)	Rhinecliff	Amtrak: Adirondack, Empire Service, Ethan Allen Express, Maple Leaf
New York	Poughkeepsie	80 (130)	Poughkeepsie	Amtrak: Adirondack, Empire Service, Ethan Allen Express, Maple Leaf; Metro-North Railroad: ■ Hudson Line; DCPT: A, B, C, D, E, Poughkeepsie RailLink; UCAT: Ulster-Poughkeepsie LINK
New York	Croton-on-Hudson	40 (64)	Croton–Harmon	Amtrak: Adirondack, Empire Service, Ethan Allen Express, Lake Shore Limited, Maple Leaf; Metro-North Railroad: ■ Hudson Line; Bee-Line: 10, 11, 14
New York	Yonkers	18 (29)	Yonkers	Amtrak: Adirondack, Empire Service, Ethan Allen Express, Maple Leaf; Metro-North Railroad: ■ Hudson Line; Bee-Line: 6, 9, 25, 32, 91
New York	New York City	0 (0)	New York Penn Station	Amtrak (long-distance): Cardinal, Crescent, Lake Shore Limited, Palmetto, Silver Meteor; Amtrak (intercity): Acela, Adirondack, Carolinian, Empire Service, Ethan Allen Express, Keystone Service, Maple Leaf, Northeast Regional, Pennsylvanian, Vermonter; LIRR: ■ City Terminal Zone, ■ Port Washington Branch; NJ Transit: ■ North Jersey Coast Line, ■ Northeast Corridor Line, ■ Gladstone Branch, ■ Montclair–Boonton Line, ■ Morristown Line; NYC Subway: PATH: HOB-33 JSQ-33 JSQ-33 (via HOB); NYC Transit buses: M7, M20, M34 SBS, M34A SBS, Q32, SIM23, SIM24
