= Rhinecliff station =

Amtrak rail station in Rhinebeck, New York

Rhinecliff, NY
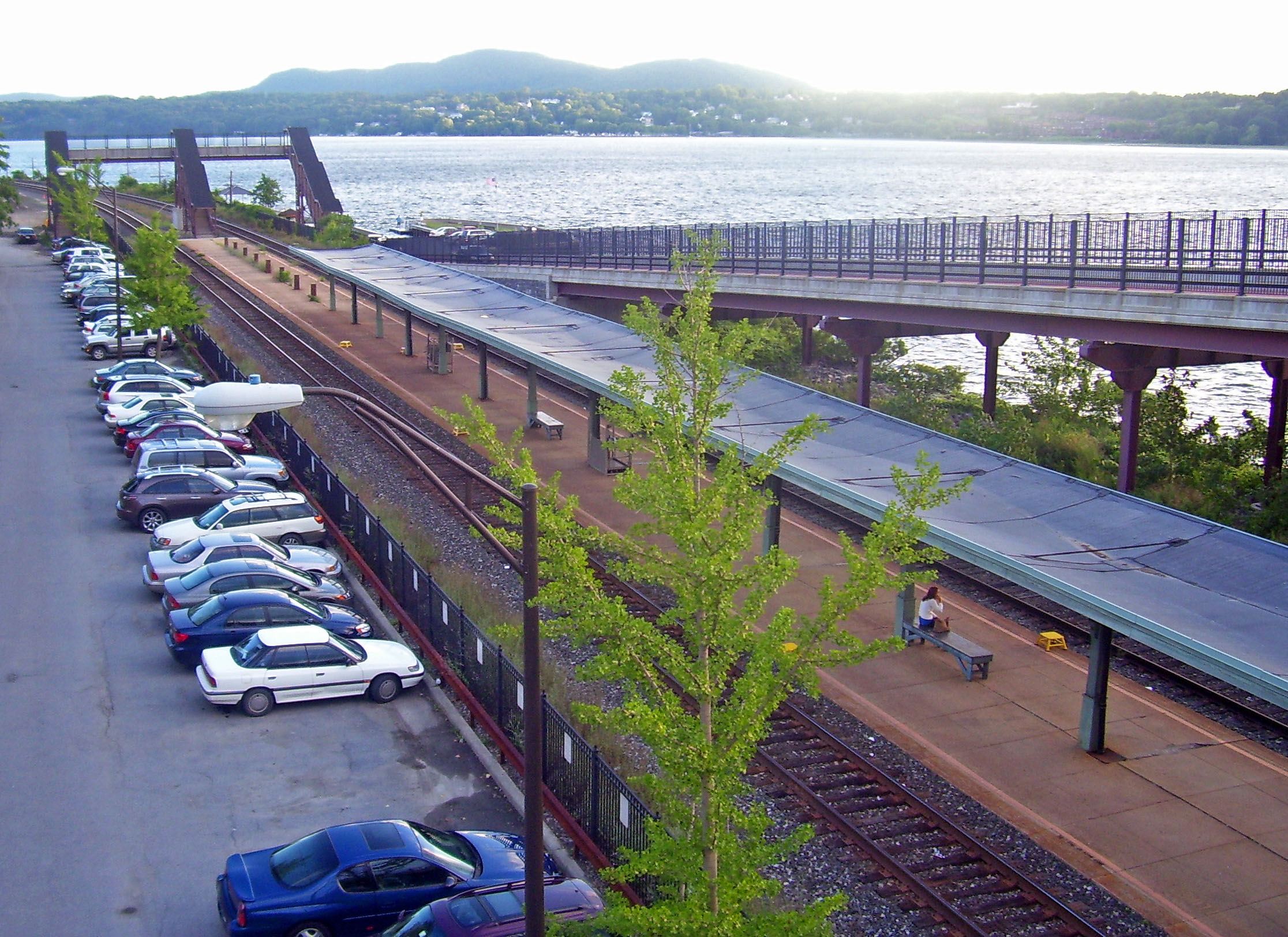
- Looking south at Rhinecliff station in July 2007

General information
- Location: 455 Rhinecliff Road; Rhinecliff, New York; United States
- Coordinates: 41.9211°N 73.9519°W
- Owner: Amtrak (station building); CSX (tracks and platforms)
- Line: CSX Hudson Subdivision
- Platforms: 1 island platform
- Tracks: 2

Construction
- Accessible: Yes

Other information
- Station code: Amtrak: RHI; Via Rail: RHIN

History
- Opened: October 1, 1851
- Rebuilt: 1852; 1870s; 1914; 2020s (planned)

Passengers
- FY 2025: 218,942 (Amtrak)

Services
| Preceding station | Amtrak | Following station |
|---|---|---|
| Hudson toward Montreal | Adirondack | Poughkeepsie toward New York |
| Hudson toward Pittsfield | Berkshire Flyer (seasonal) | Poughkeepsie toward New York |
| Hudson toward Niagara Falls, New York | Empire Service | Poughkeepsie toward New York |
| Hudson toward Burlington | Ethan Allen Express | Poughkeepsie toward New York |
| Albany–Rensselaer toward Chicago | Lake Shore Limited | Poughkeepsie toward New York |
| Hudson toward Toronto | Maple Leaf | Poughkeepsie toward New York |
Former services
| Preceding station | Amtrak | Following station |
|---|---|---|
| Hudson toward Detroit (Michigan Central) | Niagara Rainbow | Poughkeepsie toward New York (Grand Central) |
| Preceding station | New York Central Railroad | Following station |
| Barrytown toward Chicago | Main Line | Staatsburg toward New York |

U.S. Historic district – Contributing property
- Designated: March 7, 1979
- Part of: Sixteen Mile District
- Reference no.: 79001571
- Architectural style: Mission-Spanish Revival

U.S. Historic district – Contributing property
- Designated: December 14, 1990
- Part of: Hudson River Historic District
- Reference no.: 90002219
Location

Rhinecliff station (formerly Rhinecliff–Kingston) is an Amtrak intercity rail station located in the Rhinecliff hamlet of Rhinebeck, New York, United States. The station has one low-level island platform, with a wheelchair lift for accessibility. It is served by the Adirondack, Berkshire Flyer, Empire Service, Ethan Allen Express, Lake Shore Limited, and Maple Leaf.

The original Rhinebeck station opened with the Hudson River Railroad in 1851. It was relocated south a year later to resolve a dispute with the Rhinecliff–Kingston ferry; the village of Rhinecliff grew around the new location. The Rhinebeck and Connecticut Railroad (R&C) opened in 1875, prompting the station to be renamed Rhinecliff. The New York Central Railroad (NYC), successor to the Hudson River Railroad, expanded the line to four tracks in 1910–1914. The project included a new Rhinecliff station with a brick station building and two island platforms. Passenger service on the former R&C ended in 1928 and the line was abandoned in 1938.

NYC passenger service declined in the mid-20th century; the east platform was removed after the line was reduced to two tracks in 1962. The NYC merged into Penn Central in 1968, and Amtrak took over passenger service in 1971. Amtrak gradually added service; by 2000, Rhinecliff was served by 13 daily round trips. Rhinecliff station was added to the National Register of Historic Places in 1979 as a contributing property to the Sixteen Mile District, which became part of the Hudson River Historic District in 1990. The station building closed in 2022 for a two-year renovation. A project to build a longer, accessible high-level platform is planned.

== Station design ==
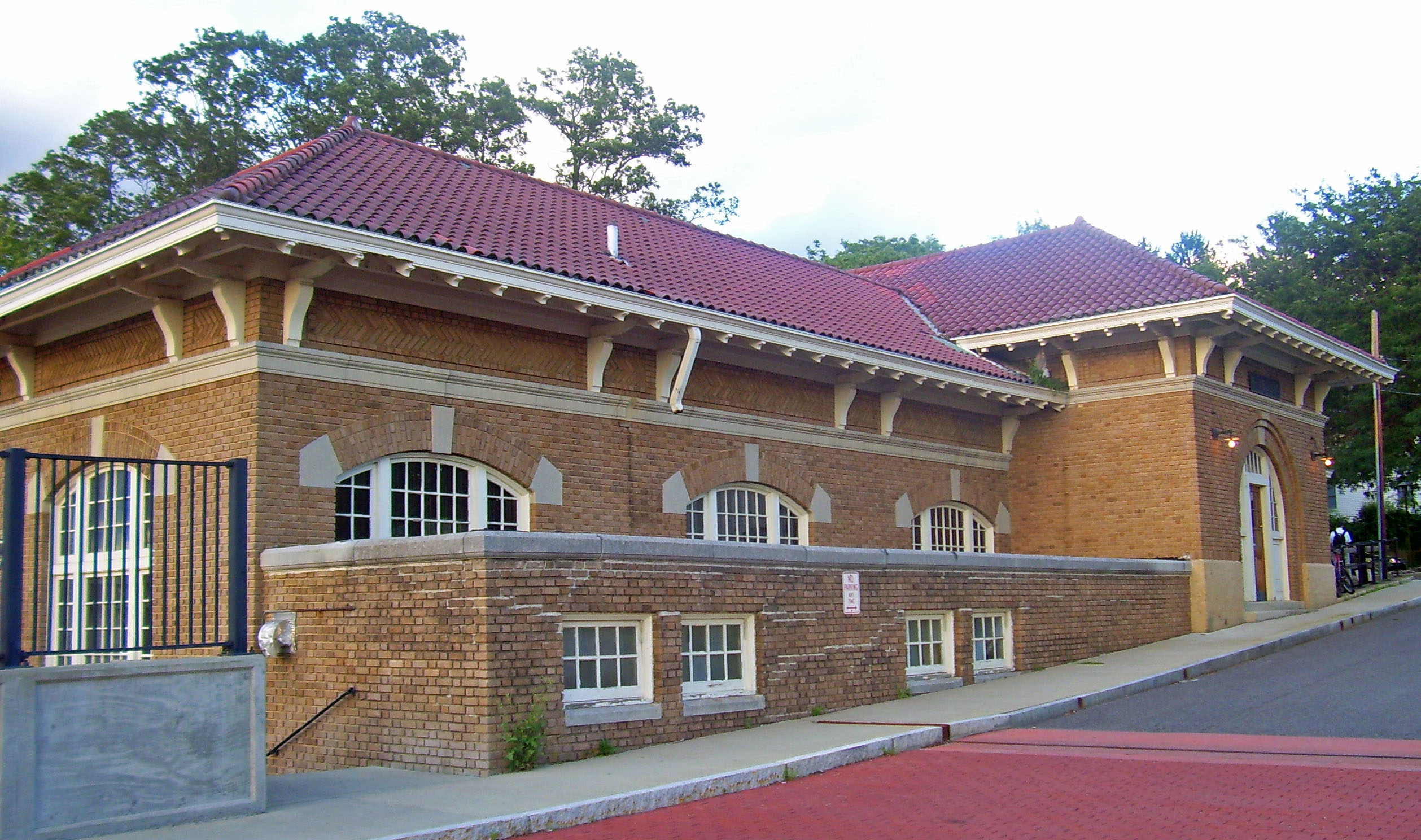
The station building in 2007

Rhinecliff station is located on the west side of the hamlet of Rhinecliff along the east bank of the Hudson River. It has a single low-level island platform, 520 feet (160 m) long, between the two tracks of the CSX Hudson Subdivision. A wheelchair lift is used for accessibility. At the north end of the platform, a footbridge with elevators and stairs connects to the station building on the east side of the tracks. At the south end, a footbridge with stairs connects to a small park on the west and Shatzell Avenue on the east. A parking lot is located on the east side of the tracks, where an additional platform and pair of tracks formerly existed. Amtrak owns the station building and part of the parking lot; CSX owns the platform, tracks, and the remainder of the parking lot.

The station building is located on the north side of Hutton Street adjacent to its overpass crossing the tracks. Its lower floor is at track level and its upper floor is level with Hutton Street. The structure is cruciform in shape with Mission and Spanish Revival architectural styles. The exterior is tan brick in Flemish bond with arched windows and a light stone cornice. Corbels support the deep eaves of the red clay tiled roof. The interior is finished in brick and wood.

As of 2024, the station is served by twelve daily round trips: eight Empire Service round trips (one of which becomes the Berkshire Flyer during summer months) plus the single daily round trips of the Adirondack, Ethan Allen Express, Lake Shore Limited, and Maple Leaf.

== History ==
=== Early stations ===
The Hudson River Railroad opened between Greenbush (across the Hudson River from Albany) and New York City on October 1, 1851. At the time, ferry service between Kingston and Rhinebeck used either of two wharves on the east (Rhinebeck) side – Slate Dock or Long Dock – as determined by majority vote of eastbound passengers. The two docks were located about 1/3 mile (0.5 km) apart, due west of Rhinebeck and north of where Rhinecliff village is now located. The railroad station was established adjacent to Slate Dock when the railroad opened.

This arrangement proved highly inconvenient to railroad passengers, who were forced to walk down the track or take a longer detour on roads if the ferry went to Long Dock, and thus often missed their trains. Ferries were also not timed to make connections with trains. These issues were intentional on the part of brothers William and Charles Handy Russell, who owned the ferry as well as significant stock in the railroad. They aimed to garner support to relocate both the ferry terminus and railroad station to Shatzell's Dock, about 0.45 miles (0.7 km) south of Slate Dock, where they owned land.

Local controversy followed the proposal. After a year of maneuvering by the Russells and their manager Thomas Cornell, the railroad's board of directors voted on October 8, 1852, to relocate the station to Shatzell's Dock. The western terminal of the ferry was changed from Kingston Point to Rondout on November 11, 1852. The eastern terminal was scheduled to change to Shatzell's Dock on that date, but it may have been delayed until the railroad began stopping at the dock on December 1. The station was located on the east side of the tracks just north of Shatzell Avenue.

A small village gradually grew around the station, though not to the size that the Russells hoped. They initially called it Shatzellville, then Boormanville (after a former president of the railroad), and finally Rhinecliff. The post office was renamed from Rhinebeck Station to Rhinecliff in 1861, but the train station stayed as Rhinebeck. A second track was added to the railroad in 1863–64. By 1867, a freight house was located on the west side of the tracks north of the station. The Hudson River Railroad was merged to become the New York Central and Hudson River Railroad (NYC&HR) in 1869.

=== Rhinebeck and Connecticut ===
The Rhinebeck and Connecticut Railroad (R&C) was chartered on June 29, 1870, to build a railroad from Rhinecliff east to the Connecticut state line, where it would join the Connecticut Western Railroad. Construction began in October 1871. Freight service began in stages as construction proceeded eastward; the line fully opened between Slate Dock and Boston Corners on April 4, 1875. Passenger service on the line initially ran only as far west as Rhinebeck village, northeast of Rhinecliff. In 1875, the railroad built a short extension south from Slate Dock along the east side of the NYC&HR to Rhinecliff. Passenger trains began using the extension in mid-August 1875. Later that year, the R&C built a new spur to reach Slate Dock without crossing the Hudson River Railroad at grade. It split off from the mainline north of Rhinecliff, passed over the Hudson River Railroad on a trestle, and sloped down to reach the dock.

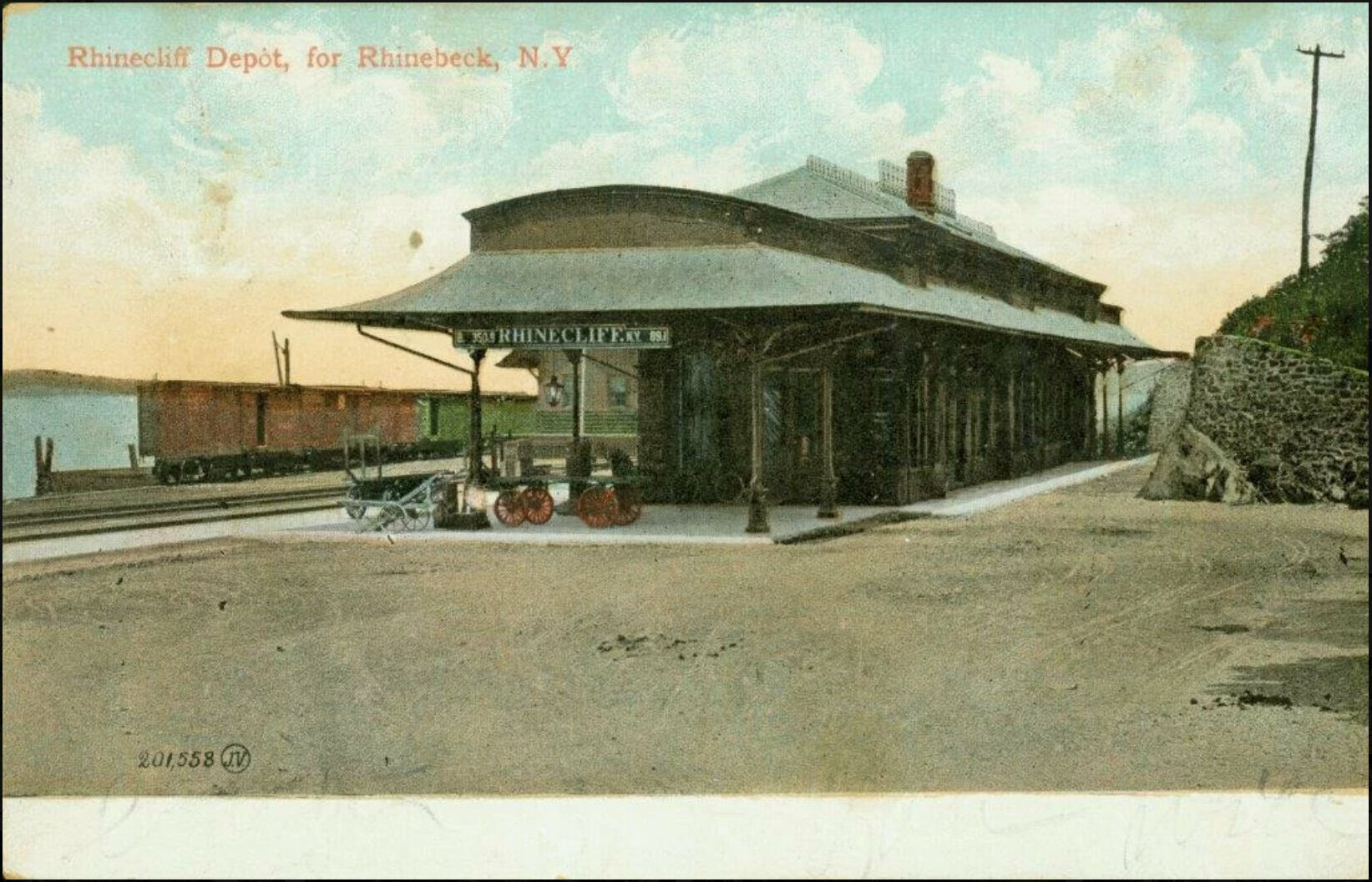
Rhinecliff station in the early 20th century

The R&C called the station Rhinecliff, though it remained "Rhinebeck" on NYC&HR schedules until the 1890s. The R&C used a single track on the east side of the station building. The aging station proved inadequate for the increased traffic; in 1877, a local newspaper likened it to a rookery. The NYC&HR soon moved a disused corrugated iron station building from Yonkers to Rhinecliff to replace the older station. The original ferry slip was on the north side of Shatzell's Dock; it was supplemented in 1877 by a second slip on the south side, and the original slip was later abandoned. Train ferry service between the Ulster and Delaware Railroad at Rondout and the R&C at Rhinecliff began in the late 1870s.

The R&C was merged into the Hartford and Connecticut Western Railroad (H&CW) in 1882. The construction of the Poughkeepsie Bridge in the 1880s triggered a series of acquisitions and mergers. The H&CW was leased by the Central New England and Western Railroad in 1889, forming a mainline running from Campbell Hall, New York, to Hartford, Connecticut. The eastern part of the former R&C was integrated into this mainline, while the western section became the Rhinecliff Branch. The line became part of the Philadelphia, Reading and New England Railroad in 1892, then the Central New England Railway (CNE) in 1899. The New York, New Haven and Hartford Railroad obtained control of the CNE in 1904, though it largely continued to operate independently.

=== 1914 station ===
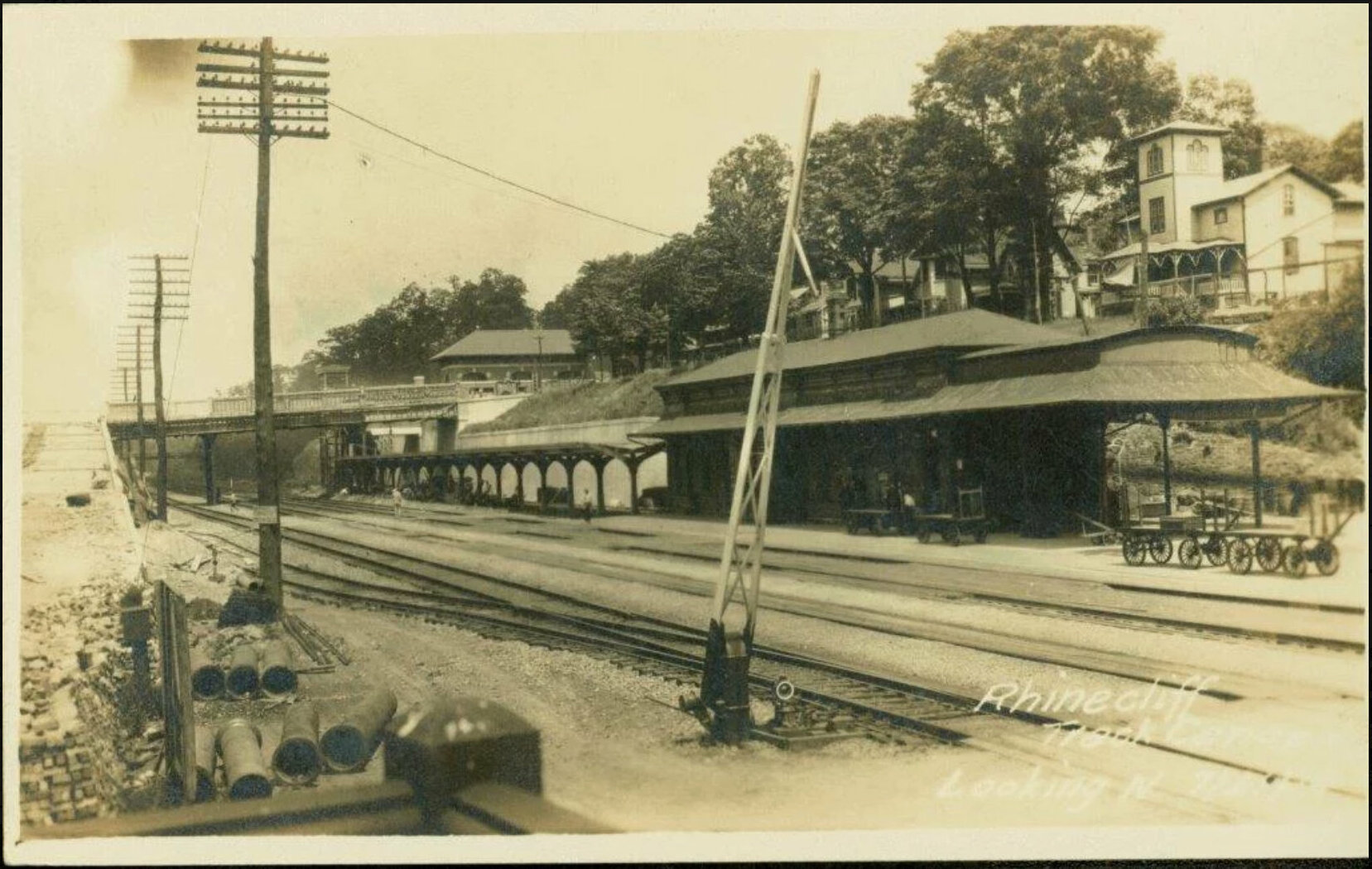
Construction of the new station around 1913 with the older station at right

The NYC&HR widened much of the line to four tracks in the early 20th century. In 1910, with quadruple-tracking south of Poughkeepsie largely complete, the company began work on the segment north from Poughkeepsie through Rhinecliff to Barrytown. At Rhinecliff, the cliff face was blasted out to make room for the additional tracks. In June 1912, the New York Public Service Commission ordered that the Shatzell Avenue grade crossing be closed. A new road bridge was to be built at Hutton Street, about 500 feet (150 m) to the north, with a footbridge at Shatzell Avenue.

As part of the quadruple-tracking, the railroad built a new station at Rhinebeck. In October 1913, the railroad issued a construction contract for the station building and platforms. The station was designed by the firm of Warren and Wetmore, which had previously designed Grand Central Terminal and other stations for the railroad. Due to the influence of wealthy Rhinebeck residents John Jacob Astor IV and Levi P. Morton, it was unusually large for a hamlet the size of Rhinecliff. The station opened in 1914 at a cost of $150,000 (equivalent to $3,460,000 in 2024), with the footbridge costing an additional $45,000. A new freight house was also constructed. The NYC&HR became the New York Central Railroad (NYC) in a 1914 merger.

While the NYC mainline (the Hudson Division) was well-used, the Rhinecliff Branch was not. By 1915, the line had just two daily round trips. This was reduced to a single mixed train round trip by 1921, and ended entirely in 1928. The line was used for freight service until August 1, 1938, when it was abandoned along with almost the entire remaining CNE system. By 1940, Rhinecliff was served by ten northbound and seven southbound daily trains on the NYC, split between New York–Albany local trains and intercity trains serving Upstate New York and beyond. Privately operated ferry service ended on December 17, 1942. The state acquired the landings and franchise; ferry service resumed on May 17, 1946. Kingston ferry service ended in January 1957, shortly before the opening of the Kingston–Rhinecliff Bridge. The railroad sold the Shatzell Avenue footbridge to the town in 1958.

The New York Central began removing tracks from the main line in the 1950s as traffic decreased. Only three tracks were in use at Rhinecliff by 1960. By then, Rhinecliff was served by five northbound and six southbound daily trains, including the Wolverine. The portion of the line between Poughkeepsie and Barrytown was further reduced to two tracks in November 1962 with the activation of centralized traffic control. At Rhinecliff, the western platform and tracks (formerly the southbound tracks) remained in service; a parking lot replaced the eastern tracks and platform. On December 3, 1967, the NYC rebranded its trains in the New York–Albany–Buffalo corridor as Empire Service. The NYC merged into Penn Central in 1968. By September of that year, Rhinecliff was served by three of the eight daily Empire Service round trips.

=== Amtrak era ===
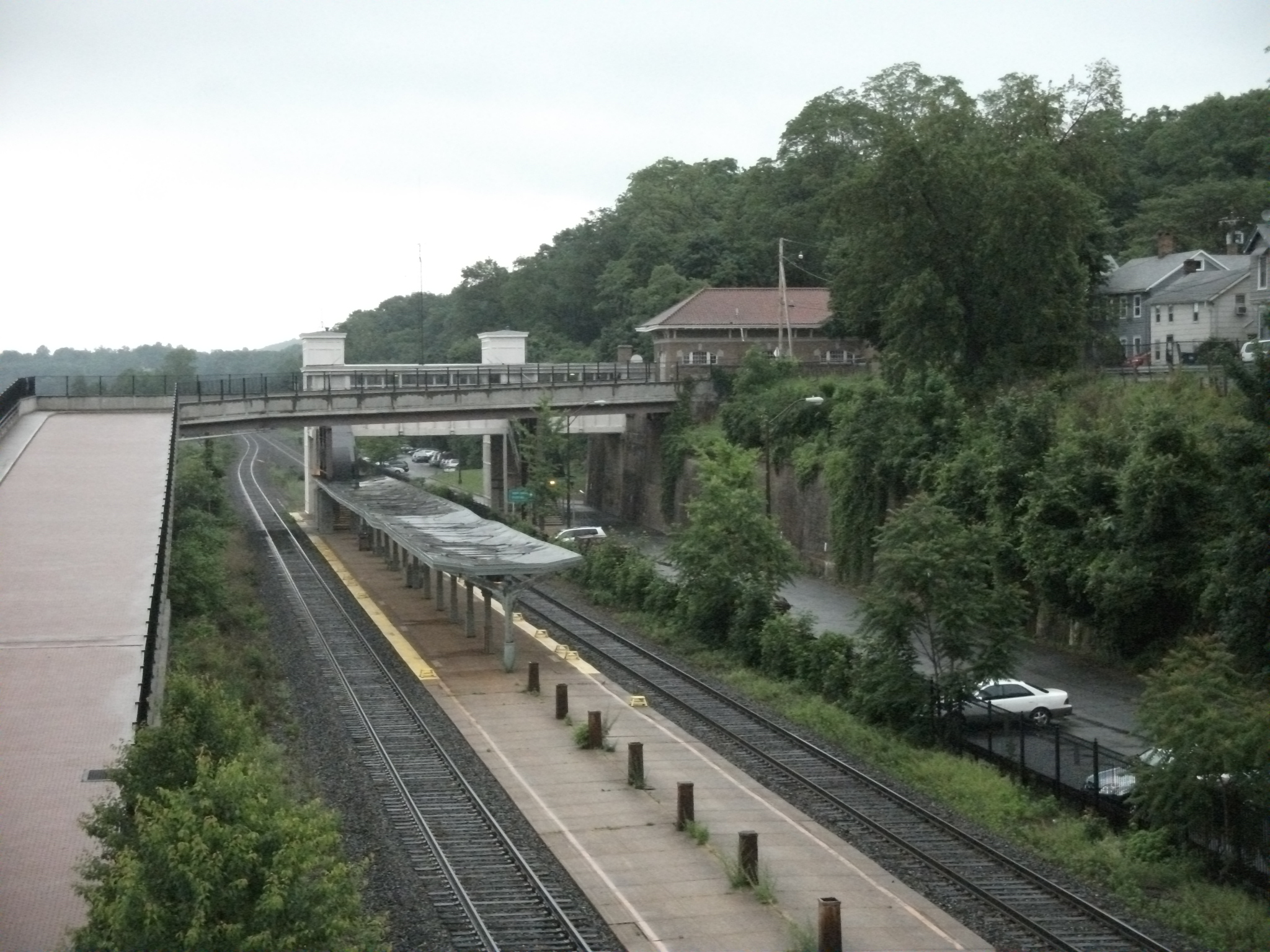
Rhinecliff station in June 2011

Amtrak took over intercity passenger service, including the Empire Service, on May 1, 1971. Amtrak initially operated seven round trips on the corridor, of which Rhinecliff was served by six northbound (westbound) and four southbound (eastbound) trips. The Lake Shore operated from May 10, 1971, to January 4, 1972; the southbound train stopped at Rhinecliff during part of 1971. Empire Service was reduced to five daily round trips, all stopping at Rhinecliff, in April 1972. Amtrak gradually added services in the corridor – many of them modifications of existing Empire Service trains – that also served points outside the Empire Corridor. The Adirondack and Empire State Express (later Niagara Rainbow) were introduced in 1974, followed by the Lake Shore Limited in 1975. By 1977, Rhinecliff was served by all eight daily round trips that operated over the New York City–Albany section.

Rhinecliff station was added to the National Register of Historic Places in 1979 as a contributing property to the Sixteen Mile District, which became part of the Hudson River Historic District in 1990. One round trip became the Maple Leaf in April 1981, while another peak-hour round trip became an express that skipped Rhinecliff and other intermediate stops. The westbound Lake Shore Limited ceased stopping at Rhinecliff on May 21, 1989; the eastbound train stopped intermittently until October 26, 1997. Brief revivals of seasonal ferry service to Kingston took place in 1992 and 2015. From 1993 to 2010, Amtrak called the station "Rhinecliff–Kingston". In 1994, Metro-North Railroad proposed to extend its Hudson Line commuter service to Rhinecliff from Poughkeepsie.

One Empire Service round trip became the Ethan Allen Express in 1996. Service increases in the 1990s brought the corridor to 14 daily round trips by 2000, of which 13 stopped at Rhinecliff. The westbound Lake Shore Limited stopped at Rhinecliff from 2005 to 2006, and the eastbound from 2007 to 2009. It resumed stopping in both directions in 2014. By early 2020, Rhinecliff was served by all 13 daily round trips on the corridor. Service was sharply reduced due to the COVID-19 pandemic, but most resumed by the end of 2020. One Empire Service round trip stopping at Rhinecliff became the Berkshire Flyer during summers starting in 2022.

In March 2020, Amtrak reached an agreement with the town and county over special district taxes. The county had confiscated the title to the station building property in 2001 over Amtrak's nonpayment of the taxes, which the railroad is normally exempt from. The agreement allowed Amtrak to proceed with plans for renovations. In August 2022, the New York State Department of Transportation (NYSDOT) was awarded $28.2 million in federal funds for final design and construction of the renovations, with a planned 30% state match. The project will include a high-level platform longer than the existing platform, improvements to elevators and footbridges, and a new interlocking south of the station.

The station building closed on December 9, 2022, for a two-year renovation including plumbing repairs, elevator replacement, and bathroom improvements. In May 2023, Amtrak indicated that the station would remain in service during the four-to-six-year construction process for the platform. The town sold the south footbridge to Amtrak for $10 in June 2023. By August 2023, a timeline for the platform renovations had not been established because NYSDOT had not finished the design. Amtrak began charging for parking on June 1, 2025. In October 2025, the Metropolitan Transportation Authority announced plans to extend one daily Hudson Line round trip north to Albany–Rensselaer station beginning in early 2026, with intermediate stops at Rhinecliff and Hudson. However, the extension was deferred in January 2026 in favor of full restoration of Amtrak service.

In April 2026, the Trump administration froze the $28.2 million in funding pending unspecified "further evaluation". At that time, construction had been expected to begin in 2027. Exterior work on the station building, separate from the federally-funded project, began in May 2026.
