= Albany–Rensselaer station =

Train station in Rensselaer, New York, US

Rensselaer, NY
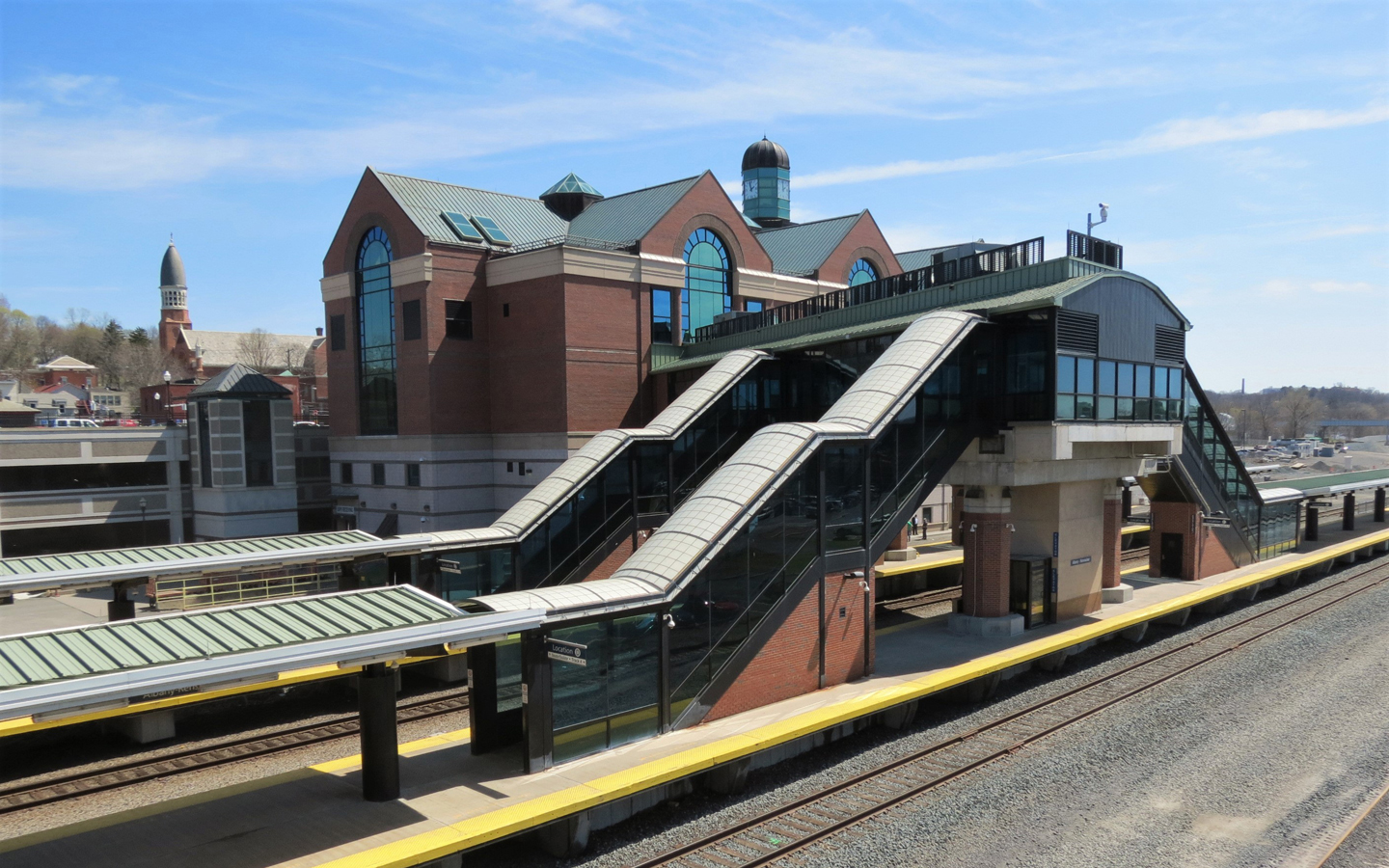
- Albany-Rensselaer station in April 2016

General information
- Location: 525 East Street; Rensselaer, New York; United States
- Coordinates: 42°38′29″N 73°44′28″W
- Owner: Capital District Transportation Authority (CDTA)
- Line: Empire Corridor (Hudson Subdivision)
- Platforms: 2 island platforms
- Tracks: 4
- Connections: CDTA: 114, 214; Megabus: M27

Construction
- Parking: 512 spaces
- Cycle facilities: Yes
- Accessible: Yes

Other information
- Station code: Amtrak: ALB; Via Rail: ALBY
- IATA code: ZLY
- Website: www.cdta.org/rail-stations

History
- Opened: December 29, 1968
- Rebuilt: June 2, 1999–September 22, 2002

Passengers
- FY 2025: 920,779 (Amtrak)

Services
Preceding station	Amtrak	Following station
Schenectady toward Montreal	Adirondack	Hudson toward New York
Schenectady toward Niagara Falls, New York	Empire Service	Hudson toward New York
Schenectady toward Burlington	Ethan Allen Express	Hudson toward New York
Schenectady toward Toronto	Maple Leaf	Hudson toward New York
Reverses direction	Berkshire Flyer (seasonal)	Pittsfield Terminus
Reverses direction	Berkshire Flyer (seasonal)	Hudson toward New York
Schenectady toward Chicago	Lake Shore Limited	Rhinecliff toward New York
Schenectady toward Chicago	Lake Shore Limited	Pittsfield toward Boston South
Former services
Preceding station	Amtrak	Following station
Colonie–Schenectady toward Chicago	Lake Shore	Poughkeepsie toward New York (Grand Central)
Colonie–Schenectady toward Detroit (Michigan Central)	Niagara Rainbow	Hudson toward New York (Grand Central)
Watervliet toward Montreal	Adirondack Rerouted in 1978	Hudson toward New York (Grand Central)
Former services at Rensselaer
Preceding station	New York Central Railroad	Following station
Albany toward Chicago	Main Line	Castleton-on-Hudson toward New York
Albany Terminus	Boston and Albany Railroad Main Line	Niverville toward Boston
Albany Terminus	Boston and Albany Railroad Main Line	East Greenbush toward Boston
Preceding station	Delaware and Hudson Railway	Following station
Albany Terminus	Albany – Troy via Rensselaer	Forbes Avenue toward Troy
Location

Albany–Rensselaer station, formally the Joseph L. Bruno Rail Station, is a train station in Rensselaer, New York, located 1.5 miles (2.4 km) from downtown Albany across the Hudson River. Operated by the Capital District Transportation Authority, it serves as Amtrak's primary station for the Capital District. The station is served by Amtrak's Empire Corridor routes – Adirondack, Berkshire Flyer, Empire Service, Ethan Allen Express, Lake Shore Limited, and Maple Leaf.

== Station design and services ==
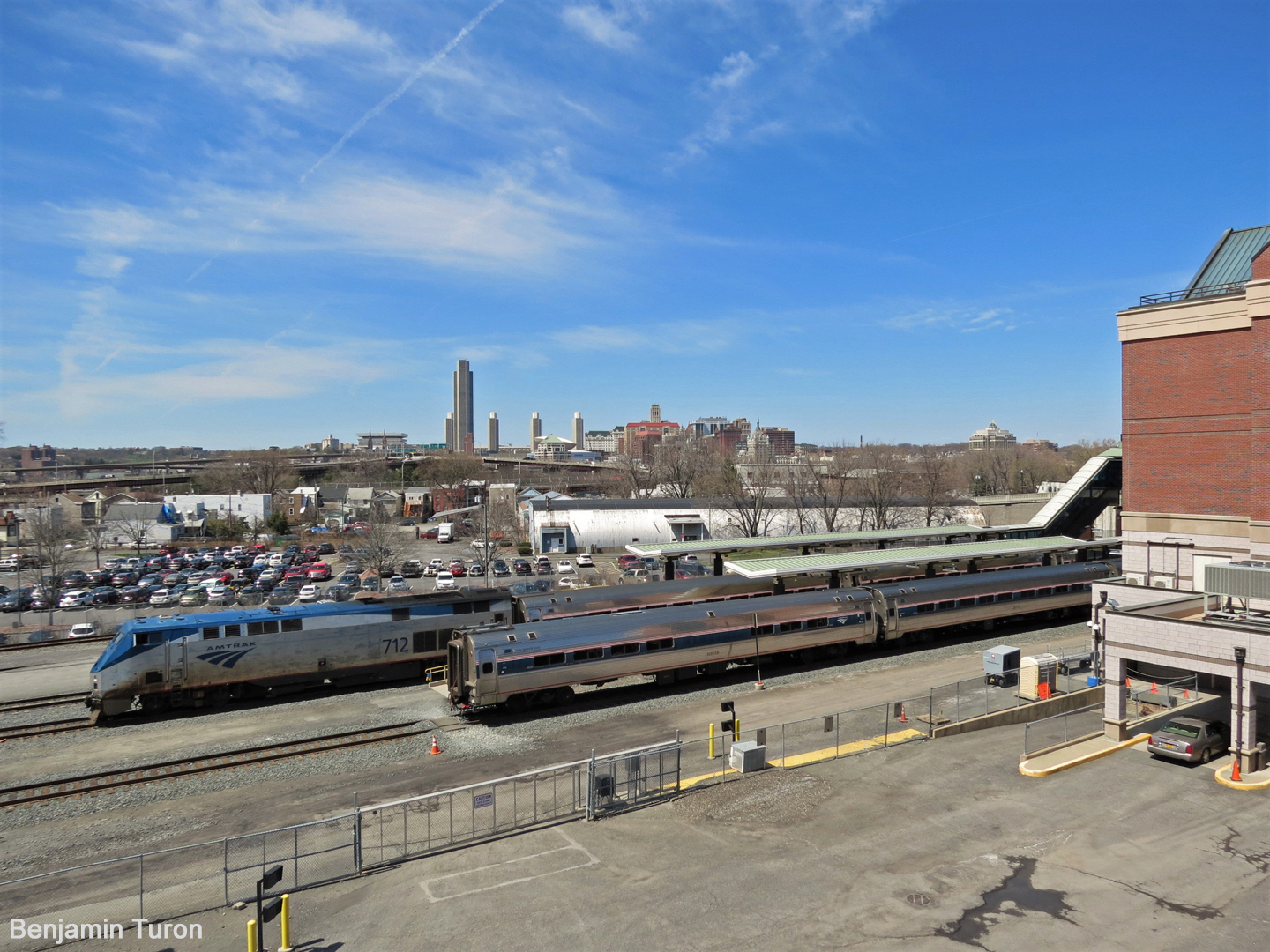
Two Amtrak trains at Albany–Rensselaer station, as viewed from the parking deck over the platforms

The two floor station features a large main lobby that contains a coffee shop, a newsstand, and a post office. Trains call at two high-level island platforms serving two tracks in each direction. The platforms are connected to the main building by an aerial walkway that is accessed by stairs, escalator and elevator. Each 605-foot (184 m) platform can accommodate up to 7 Amfleet cars, not including an engine.

The station is served by multiple daily round trips of the Empire Service, most of which terminate at Albany–Rensselaer; two round trips continue northward to Niagara Falls. It is also a service stop for the daily round trips of the Adirondack, Ethan Allen Express, Lake Shore Limited, and Maple Leaf, plus the seasonal Berkshire Flyer. Albany–Rensselaer is the junction point between the New York City and Boston sections of the Lake Shore Limited. Most trains continuing south of Albany swap their engines there. Diesel GE P42DC locomotives are usually used on routes north and west of Albany, while dual mode P32AC-DM locomotives are used south of Albany because diesel locomotives are not permitted in New York City's Penn Station. Whenever a P42DC arrives southbound at Albany, it is swapped out to await a train coming north. In the late 2020s and early 2030s, the corridor routes will receive Airo trainsets, which will eliminate the need for most engine changes at Albany–Rensselaer.

The station is also served by Megabus and Vermont Translines intercity bus routes and by Capital District Transportation Authority local bus service.

== History ==
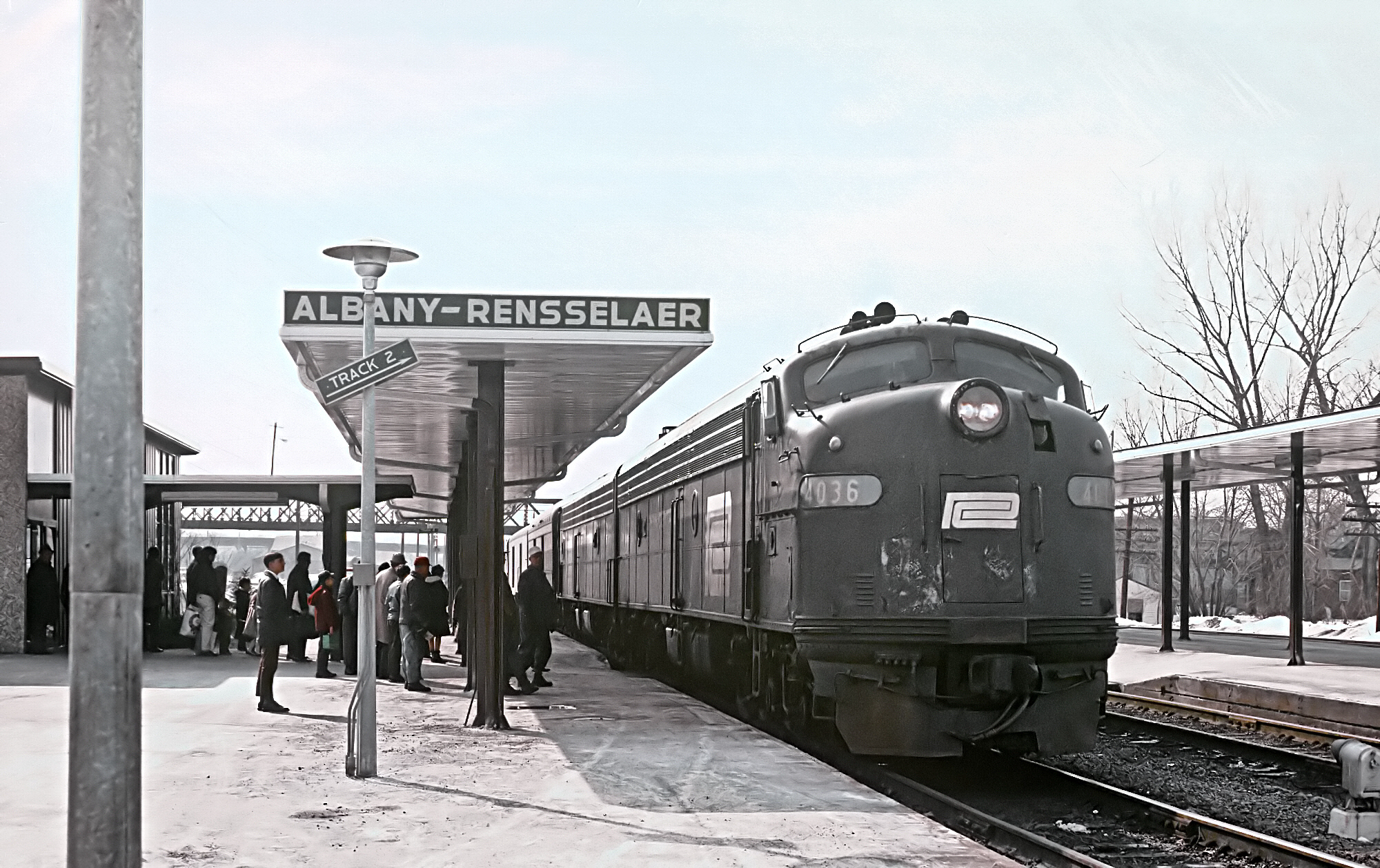
A Penn Central Empire Service train arriving at Albany-Rensselaer in 1970

=== Early years ===
The first station at Albany–Rensselaer was built by Penn Central in 1968 to replace Albany Union Station due to the construction of Interstate 787. It was replaced in 1980 at the same site. The 1968 building was torn down in order to expand the station's parking facility. The current structure was completed in September 2002 and opened on September 22. It was designed by the Schenectady architecture firm Stracher–Roth Gilmore and the New York firm Vollmer Associates, with Ryan-Biggs of Troy providing structural engineering, Sage/Engineering Associates providing MEP engineering services, Erdman Anthony of Troy providing facilities engineering, and constructed by U. W. Marx/Bovis joint venture.

=== 21st century ===
The station was originally intended to have four tracks, but was built with only three due to cost concerns, leaving the station with fewer than preferable tracks. In October 2008, it was announced that a fourth track would be built after the two previous terminal buildings were demolished; a contract for that work was assigned at the same time. Design work was proceeding on the fourth track as of February 2010, but actual construction was placed on hold pending resolution of funding issues and demolition of the two terminal buildings to the north. On October 27, 2010, demolition of the two other buildings began. In a December 4, 2012 press release, Amtrak indicated that installation of the fourth track would begin in 2013, and the project was completed in March 2016.

==== 2020s growth ====
By 2020, it was Amtrak's ninth-busiest station, as well as the busiest to serve a metro area with a population smaller than 2 million, a distinction it has held since at least 2010. This is primarily due to the large number of passengers who commute to and from New York City. In March 2020, Adirondack and Ethan Allen Express service was suspended north of Albany–Rensselaer as part of a round of service reductions in response to the ongoing coronavirus pandemic. Ethan Allen Express service was restored in July 2021, and Adirondack service was restored in April 2023.

The Berkshire Flyer began running on July 8, 2022, providing direct service to Pittsfield on summer weekends. The train reverses direction at Albany–Rensselaer. In October 2023, the station was formally renamed in honor of the late New York State Senate Majority Leader Joseph Bruno, who was instrumental in replacing the old station (which he once described as a "matchbox") with the current facility. It is one of two major public facilities in Rensselaer County named for Bruno, the other being Joseph L. Bruno Stadium in Troy.

In October 2025, the Metropolitan Transportation Authority announced that it planned to extend one daily Hudson Line round-trip northward to Albany–Rensselaer station beginning in early 2026, with two intermediate stops. In January 2026, Governor Kathy Hochul announced that Amtrak would be restoring full service between New York City and Albany in March. In her announcement she said, "with the full restoration of Empire Service, Amtrak has notified New York State and the MTA that it will no longer sanction temporary Metro-North service to Albany at this time."
