= Poughkeepsie station =

Train station in New York

Poughkeepsie
- Poughkeepsie station in 2006

General information
- Location: 41 Main Street; Poughkeepsie, New York; United States
- Coordinates: 41°42′26″N 73°56′18″W
- Owner: Metro-North Railroad
- Line: Hudson Line
- Platforms: 1 side platform, 1 island platform
- Tracks: 4
- Connections: Dutchess County Public Transit: A, B, C, D, E, Poughkeepsie RailLink; Leprechaun Lines: White Plains Bus; Short Line Bus: X32N; Ulster County Area Transit: Ulster-Poughkeepsie LINK

Construction
- Parking: 1,101 spaces
- Accessible: Yes

Other information
- Station code: Amtrak: POU; Via Rail: POUG
- Fare zone: 9 (Metro-North)

History
- Opened: January 4, 1850
- Rebuilt: 1916–February 17, 1918; 2009

Passengers
- FY 2025: 137,123 (Amtrak)
- 2018: 1,956 daily (Metro-North)
- Rank: 31 of 124 (Metro-North)

Services
Preceding station	Amtrak	Following station
Rhinecliff toward Montreal	Adirondack	Croton–Harmon toward New York
Rhinecliff toward Pittsfield	Berkshire Flyer (seasonal)	Croton–Harmon toward New York
Rhinecliff toward Niagara Falls, New York	Empire Service	Croton–Harmon toward New York
Rhinecliff toward Burlington	Ethan Allen Express	Croton–Harmon toward New York
Rhinecliff toward Chicago	Lake Shore Limited	Croton–Harmon toward New York
Rhinecliff toward Toronto	Maple Leaf	Croton–Harmon toward New York
Preceding station	Metro-North Railroad	Following station
Terminus	Hudson Line	New Hamburg toward Grand Central
Former services
Preceding station	Amtrak	Following station
Albany–Rensselaer toward Chicago	Lake Shore	Croton–Harmon toward New York (Grand Central)
Rhinecliff toward Detroit (Michigan Central)	Niagara Rainbow	Croton–Harmon toward New York (Grand Central)
Preceding station	New York Central Railroad	Following station
Hyde Park toward Chicago	Main Line	Camelot toward New York
- Poughkeepsie Railroad Station
- U.S. National Register of Historic Places
- Area: 8.7 acres (3.5 ha)
- Architect: Warren & Wetmore
- Architectural style: Beaux Arts
- NRHP reference No.: 76001214
- Added to NRHP: November 21, 1976
Location

Poughkeepsie station is a Metro-North Railroad and Amtrak stop serving the city of Poughkeepsie, New York. The station is the northern terminus of Metro-North's Hudson Line, and an intermediate stop for Amtrak's several Empire Corridor trains.

Built in 1918, the main station building is meant to be a much smaller version of Grand Central Terminal. It was a source of civic pride when it opened. In 1976 it was added to the National Register of Historic Places as Poughkeepsie Railroad Station; it and Philipse Manor are the only Hudson Line stations outside Manhattan to be so recognized.

== Station layout ==
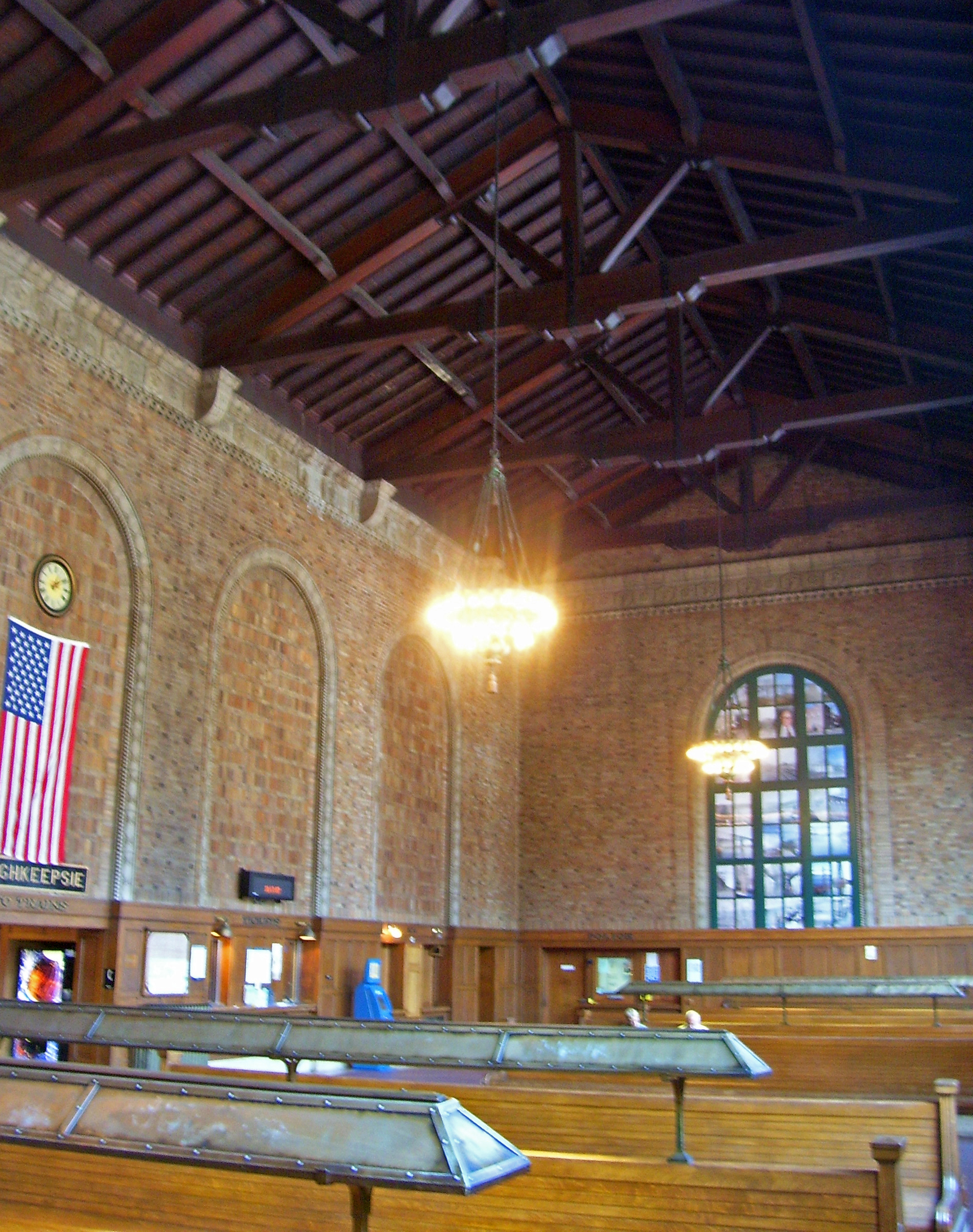
Waiting room

The station is a four-story building built into a rockface, with the bottom two levels given over to the tracks and the top two accounted for by the main waiting room, a two-story brick-faced building. Its five-bay facade features sculptured masonry designs over the five high arched windows. To the west, a 420x15-foot (128x5 m) steel-frame overhead walkway provides access to the tracks via stairs and elevators. Today it continues westward to provide access to the adjacent parking garage. At the time of the station's construction, it served the businesses along Main Street.

The waiting room, modeled on Grand Central Terminal, is a high gallery lit during daylight by the windows and the three original chandeliers. The 14 benches within are also original finished chestnut pieces. The walls are paneled in wood to eight feet (240 cm), after which the carved stone shows all the way to the cornice. More original woodwork, the stained walnut rafters, is present in the ceiling, possibly modeled after a similar design in San Miniato al Monte, an 11th-century church in Florence, Italy.

Amenities include bathrooms (also modernized), a concession stand, as well as a ticket counter selling Metro-North tickets alongside two vending machines which sold MetroCards prior to May 2025. There is no checked baggage service for Amtrak trains; Amtrak tickets are available only via a Quik-Trak kiosk. The northernmost MTA Police substation is adjacent to the station as well. In the late 1960s the North-South Arterial (US 9) was built and elevated immediately to the station's east, somewhat isolating it from the rest of the city.

There are four tracks at the platform level, enough to accommodate Amtrak and Metro-North stops simultaneously, and from west to east numbered 2, 1, 3, and 5. Only tracks 2, 1, and 3 are regularly used. Track 5, the easternmost, has a lower speed limit and is used mainly for non-revenue maintenance trains or those experiencing difficulties. The station has a high-level island platform, high level side platform, and a low level side platform, each six cars long and slightly offset from each other. Only the high level platforms are used in passenger service.

== History ==
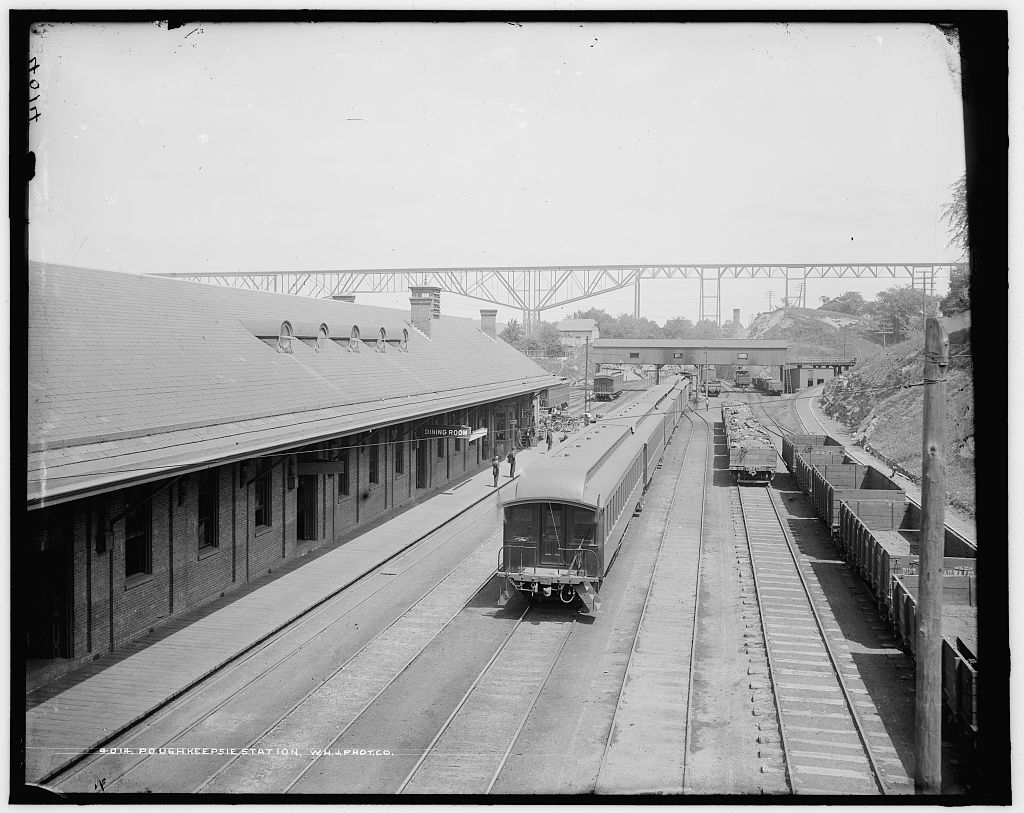
Poughkeepsie station around 1890

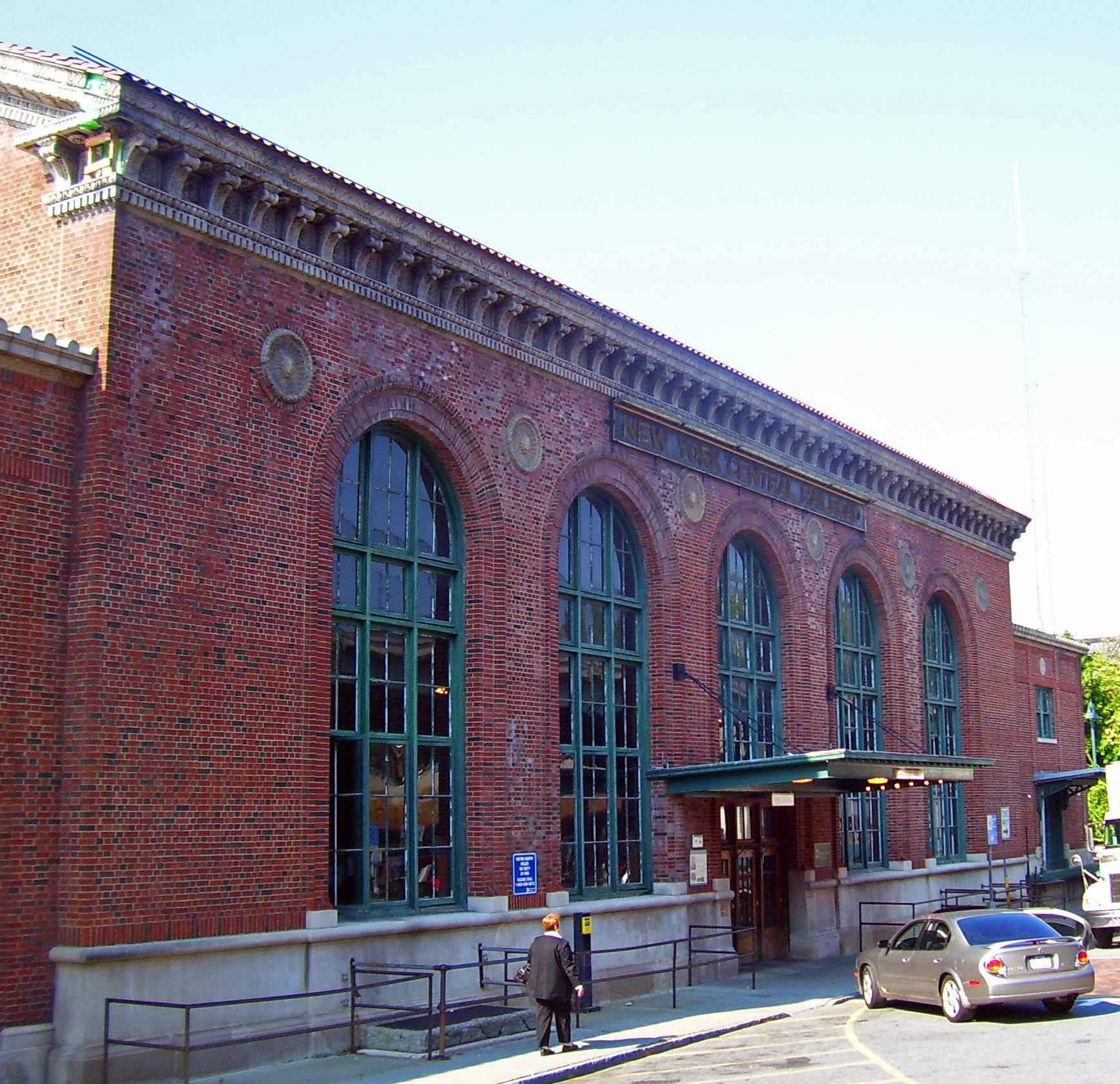
The station building in 2006

The first Poughkeepsie station was built in 1850 as what became the New York Central Railroad's Water Level Route worked its way up the Hudson River. For its first two years it was the end of the line, but even after it was completed all the way to Albany, it remained the most important intermediate stop. Many local industries, particularly the carpet mills and shoe factories in the city, used the rail facilities to get their products to market. The concentration of industry around a major rail stop also led to the rise of banking and finance within the city as well.

In 1889, with the completion of the nearby Poughkeepsie Railroad Bridge providing east–west rail service across the Hudson, Poughkeepsie became even more important to regional rail transportation. When it came time for a third station to be built on the site, the firm of Warren & Wetmore was hired to design a station that would impress travelers and communicate the city's confidence and cosmopolitan aspirations. They chose to model it on Grand Central, another successful design of theirs.

After five years of design and construction, the station was opened on February 18, 1918. The city's main newspaper, then the Poughkeepsie Eagle (now the Poughkeepsie Journal) was unstinting in its praise:

Poughkeepsie woke up Sunday and rubbed its eyes when it visited the new station of the New York Central Railroad, and gasped. Was this Poughkeepsie or a station in the Bronx? The new building certainly surpassed anything dreamed of by the present generation of Poughkeepsians and no more will travelers get a poor impression of the place by what they see when they alight from the railroad trains.

The building has remained largely intact since then, despite declines in passenger rail use and the demise of the New York Central. It has since transitioned, under the auspices of the Metropolitan Transportation Authority, from being a station for primarily intercity rail to the commuter services of Metro-North. It was added to the National Register of Historic Places in 1976. Until April 4, 2009, the southbound Lake Shore Limited (Train 48) stopped at the station, as well as at Hudson, and Rhinecliff stations. On November 8, 2010, Lake Shore Limited service to the station was restored in both directions, and later at Rhinecliff, but not at Hudson.

A massive restoration in the late 20th century included the reconstruction of the overpass from the station to Main Street and a large parking garage to serve commuters (many of whom come from points north and west). Since the 1990s, there have been rumors and plans to expand the Hudson Line north to Rhinecliff (or even further to Rensselaer). Local property owners have objected to the given plans to build stations in Hyde Park and Staatsburg though those who do commute via Poughkeepsie are in favor of the plan.

The Berkshire Flyer began running on July 8, 2022, providing direct service to Pittsfield on summer weekends.

== Bibliography ==
- Hasbrouck, Frank (1909). The History of Dutchess County, New York. Poughkeepsie, New York: S.A. Matthieu.
