= Hyde Park station (New York Central Railroad) =

Hyde Park
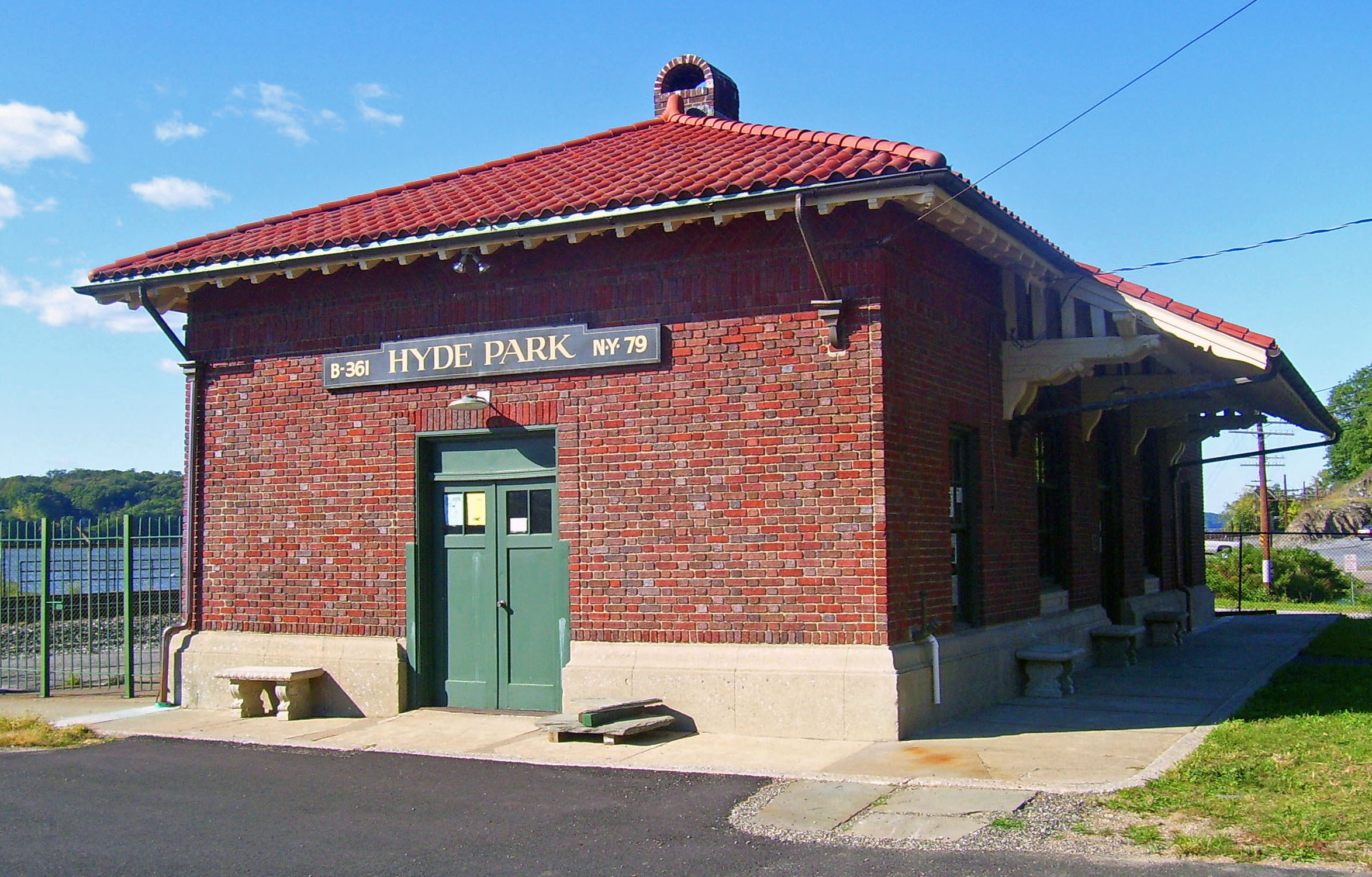
- Station building in 2007

General information
- Location: 34 River Road, Hyde Park, Dutchess County, New York 12538
- Platforms: 2 side
- Tracks: 4

History
- Closed: 1958

Former services
Preceding station	New York Central Railroad	Following station
Staatsburgh toward Chicago	Main Line	Poughkeepsie toward New York
- Hyde Park Railroad Station
- U.S. National Register of Historic Places
- Coordinates: 41°47′14″N 73°56′47″W
- Built: 1914
- Architect: Warren and Wetmore
- Architectural style: Mission/Spanish Revival
- NRHP reference No.: 81000403
- Added to NRHP: 1981
Location

Hyde Park is a former New York Central Railroad station located where Crum Elbow Creek flows into the Hudson River in Hyde Park, New York. A one-story wooden station was first established by the Central at the spot in 1851 by the Hudson River Railroad, connecting New York City and Albany. It was replaced by the existing building, built in a combination of the Mission and Spanish Revival styles by Warren and Wetmore, the railroad's preferred architects who had also designed Grand Central Terminal and the nearby Poughkeepsie station, in 1914.

The station saw heavy use throughout the early years of its existence, due to the proximity of estates such as the Vanderbilt Mansion and, later, President Franklin D. Roosevelt's frequent retreats to his home in Hyde Park. Roosevelt is known to have passed through the station twice during his presidency: in 1939 when he greeted King George VI and Queen Elizabeth of the United Kingdom on their 1939 visit, and posthumously in 1945, when his body was unloaded there in preparation for burial. However, even by Franklin D. Roosevelt's first term, it was only a local stop on local New York City–Albany trains, with the named trains bypassing the station.

When passenger rail transport in the U.S. declined as air and auto established themselves as alternatives in mid-century, the station began to see less traffic. Regular train service was suspended in 1953, after which it may have become a flag stop. It was listed by the Central as a station until 1958, after which the outer two of the line's four tracks were torn up and the tunnel to the southbound platforms closed off. Eventually the Central sold the station building to the Town of Hyde Park, one of many assets it divested itself of as it tried to stay afloat.

Local youths began fixing the station up for use as a teen center, but they failed to finish the project. By 1975 the abandoned building had fallen into disrepair and become heavily vandalized. It was one day away from demolition when the Hudson Valley Railroad Society (HVRS) took possession, renting the station from the town for a dollar per year for fifteen years. The HVRS completed the extensive interior and exterior renovations needed, including completely restoring the tiled roof, and began converting it into a regional rail museum, raising operating funds with an annual model train show.

The tracks, fenced off for safety reasons, remain in use by CSX and Amtrak's Empire Service. The station could possibly become part of an active passenger station again if the idea of extending Metro-North's Hudson Line commuter rail service northward from its current terminus at Poughkeepsie is ever realized.
