= Hudson station (New York) =

Train station in the State of New York

Hudson, NY
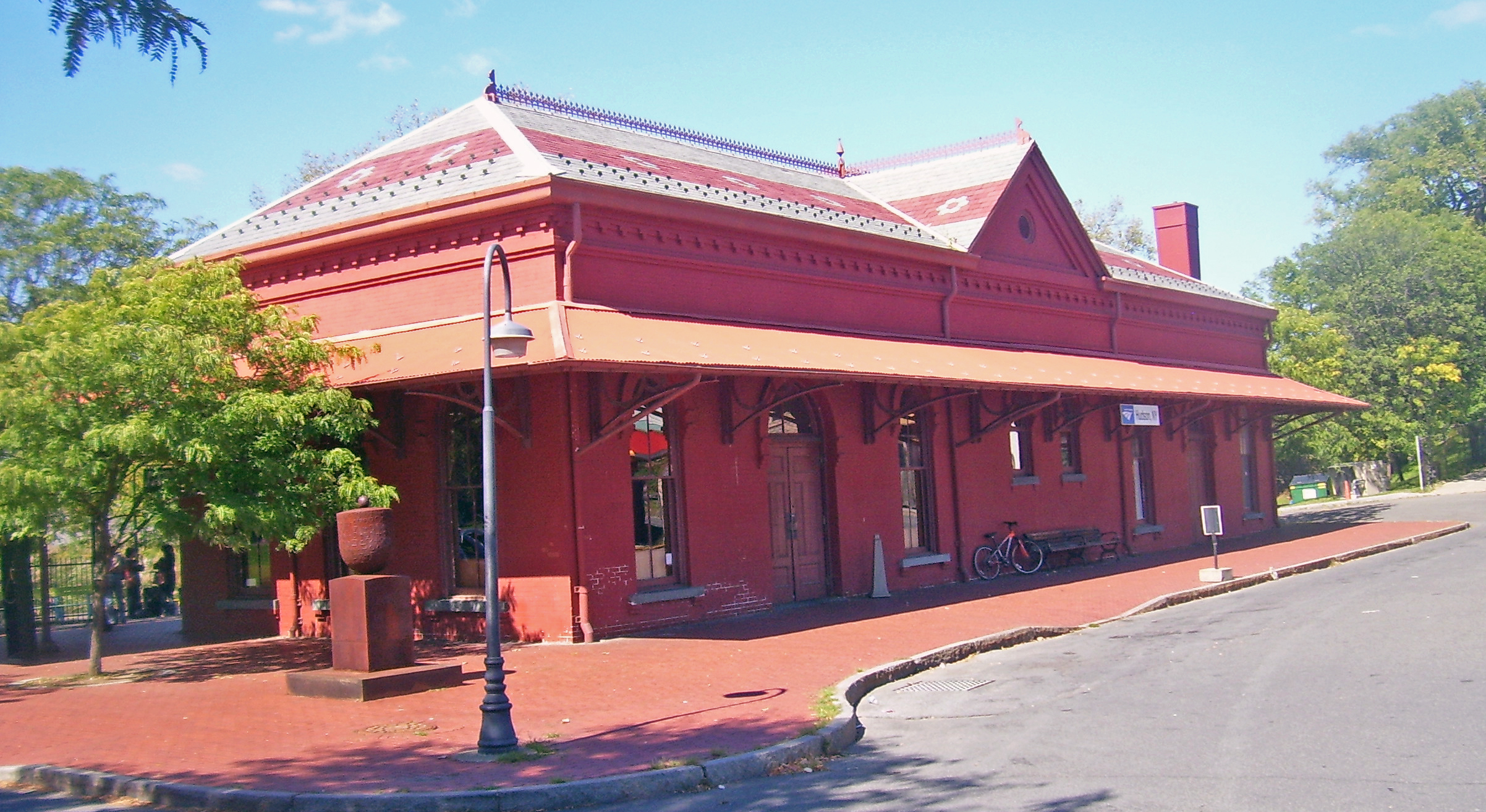
- East elevation and south profile of station, 2008

General information
- Location: 69 South Front Street; Hudson, New York; United States
- Coordinates: 42.2541°N 73.7977°W
- Owner: Amtrak (station house); City of Hudson (parking lot)
- Line: Empire Corridor (Hudson Subdivision)
- Platforms: 2 island platforms
- Tracks: 3
- Connections: Columbia County Public Transportation, Greene County Transit 711

Construction
- Parking: Yes
- Accessible: Yes

Other information
- Station code: Amtrak: HUD; Via Rail: HUDS

History
- Opened: 1874
- Rebuilt: 1992

Passengers
- FY 2025: 274,515 (Amtrak)

Services
Preceding station	Amtrak	Following station
Albany–Rensselaer toward Montreal	Adirondack	Rhinecliff toward New York
Albany–Rensselaer toward Pittsfield	Berkshire Flyer (seasonal)	Rhinecliff toward New York
Albany–Rensselaer toward Niagara Falls, New York	Empire Service	Rhinecliff toward New York
Albany–Rensselaer toward Burlington	Ethan Allen Express	Rhinecliff toward New York
Albany–Rensselaer toward Toronto	Maple Leaf	Rhinecliff toward New York
Lake Shore Limited does not stop here
Former services
Preceding station	Amtrak	Following station
Albany–Rensselaer toward Detroit (Michigan Central)	Niagara Rainbow	Rhinecliff toward New York (Grand Central)
Preceding station	New York Central Railroad	Following station
Stockport toward Chicago	Main Line	North Germantown toward New York
Terminus	Hudson Branch	Hudson Upper toward Chatham
Location

Hudson station is a train station in Hudson, New York. Hudson serves a total of four different Amtrak trains, all of which have a southern terminus at Pennsylvania Station in New York City. They consist of the Adirondack from Montreal, Quebec, Canada, the Empire Service from Niagara Falls, New York, the Ethan Allen Express from Burlington, VT, and the Maple Leaf from Toronto, Ontario, Canada. Lake Shore Limited trains from Chicago served Hudson until April 4, 2009.

== History ==
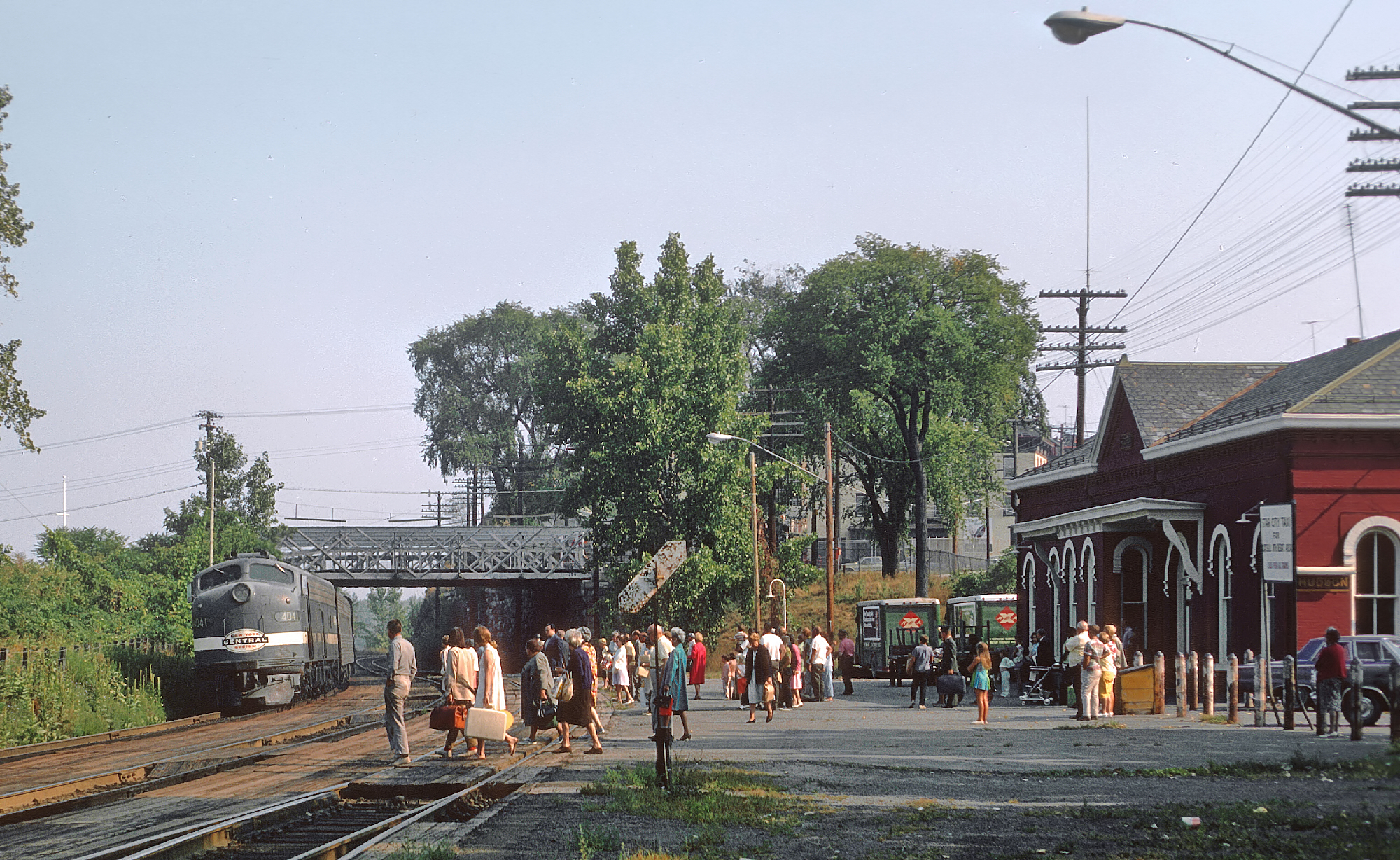
A New York Central train at Hudson, 1968

Originally built in 1874 by the New York Central Railroad, it is the oldest continuously operated station in the state. Besides the Water Level Route, Hudson was also the terminus of the former Boston and Albany Railroad Hudson Branch, on which passenger service ran until 1932.

Passenger service at the station as well as across the nation was assumed by Amtrak in 1971. In the late 1980s, the parking lots on either side of the station were repaved. The next renovation took place between 1991 and 1992 with funds from New York State, after the renovations, the station had a grand re-opening. In the late 1990s, ridership at the Hudson station grew to the point that the city opened up an additional parking lot across the street. In 2009, the city created metered parking on Front Street due to the continuing demand. A task force recently studied the feasibility of raising the platform, a difficult task since north end of the platform is curved and an active freight siding lies near that side of the station.

The Berkshire Flyer began running on July 8, 2022, providing direct service to Pittsfield on summer weekends.

In October 2025, the Metropolitan Transportation Authority announced that it planned to extend one daily Hudson Line round-trip northward to Albany–Rensselaer station beginning in early 2026; the extended trip would make intermediate stops at Rhinecliff and Hudson stations. Then in January 2026, Governor Kathy Hocul announced, "With the full restoration of Empire Service, Amtrak has notified New York State and the MTA that it will no longer sanction temporary Metro-North service to Albany at this time."

== Station layout ==
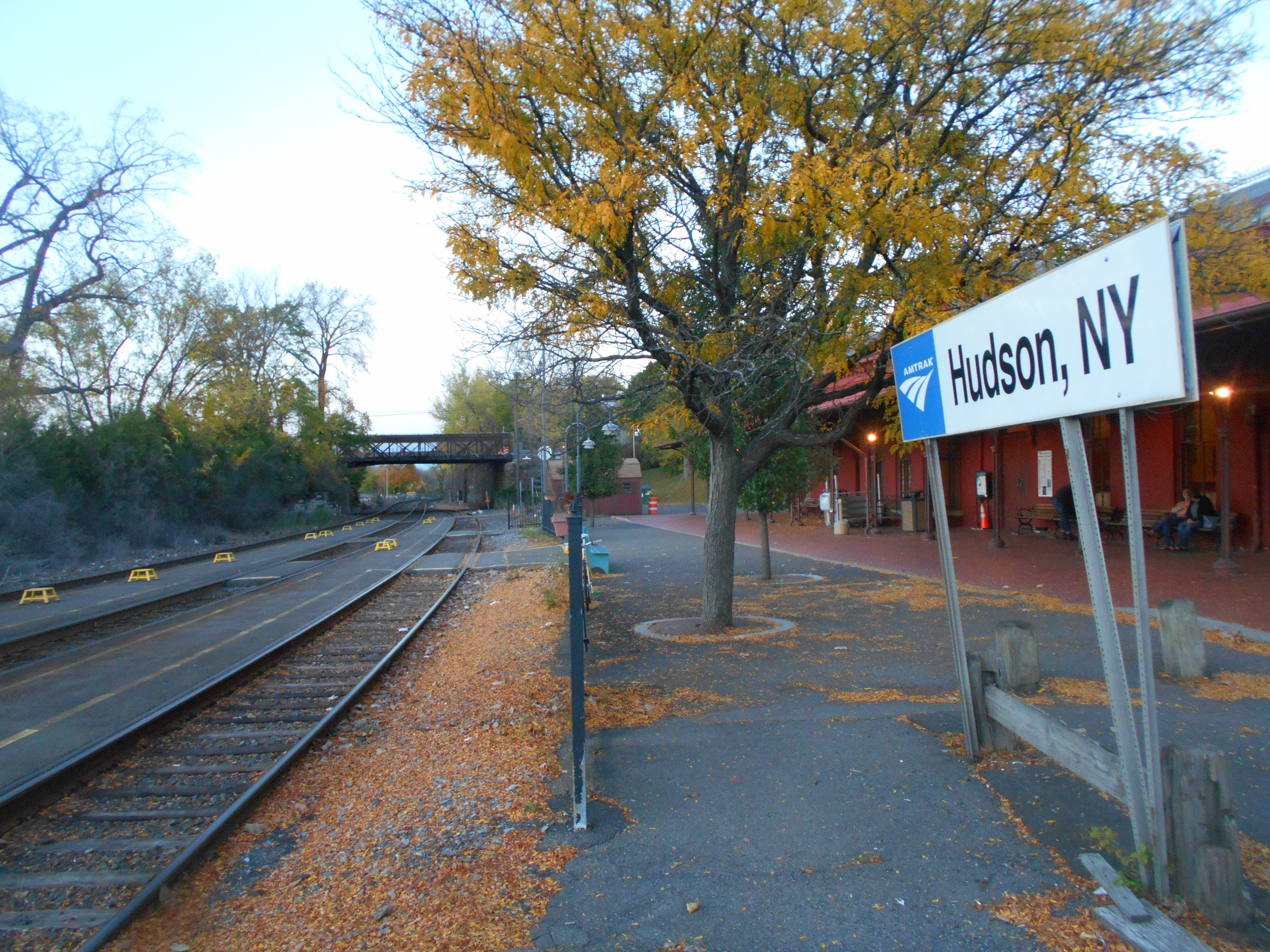
The platforms at Hudson station

The station has two low-level paved island platforms. Northbound trains generally use Track 1 while southbound trains generally use Track 2. with both trains opening doors on the eastern side. The third track is a passing loop that merges into Track 1 on either side of the station. Passengers are required to wait east of the passing loop until the train arrives in the station. The station is wheelchair-accessible, with passengers reaching the train via a portable wheelchair lift.
