= Empire Corridor =

Federally designated high-speed rail corridor in the U.S. state of New York

Coordinates: 43°9′47.6″N 77°36′28.9″W

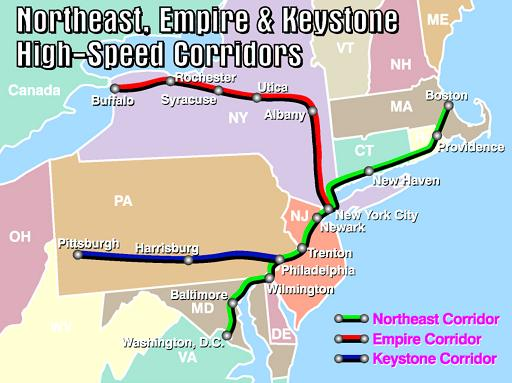
- Empire Corridor (red) as designated by the Federal Railroad Administration

Overview
- Owner: CSX (Niagara–Poughkeepsie); Metro-North (Poughkeepsie–Riverdale); Amtrak (Riverdale–New York)
- Termini: Niagara Falls; New York Penn Station
- Stations: 35 (12 Amtrak, 20 Metro North, 3 shared)

Service
- Type: Higher-speed rail, commuter rail
- System: Amtrak; CSX Transportation
- Services: Empire Service, Ethan Allen Express, Adirondack, Lake Shore Limited, Maple Leaf, Berkshire Flyer, Hudson Line
- Operator(s): CSX (Niagara–Schenectady); Amtrak (Schenectady–Poughkeepsie); Metro-North (Poughkeepsie–Yonkers); Amtrak (Yonkers–New York)

Technical
- Line length: 461 mi (742 km)
- Track gauge: 4 ft 8 1/2 in (1,435 mm) standard gauge

The Empire Corridor is a 461-mile (742 km) passenger rail corridor in New York State running between Penn Station in New York City and Niagara Falls, New York. Major cities on the route include Poughkeepsie, Albany, Schenectady, Amsterdam, Utica, Syracuse, Rochester, and Buffalo. Much of the corridor was once part of the New York Central Railroad's main line.

Amtrak's Empire Service and Maple Leaf serve the entire length of the Empire Corridor, with the Maple Leaf continuing northwest to Toronto. The Lake Shore Limited follows most of the corridor from New York City, diverging west to Chicago at the Buffalo–Depew station. The Berkshire Flyer takes the corridor to Albany–Rensselaer, before diverging east to Pittsfield, while the Adirondack and Ethan Allen Express travel one stop further to Schenectady, before diverging north to Montreal and Burlington, respectively. Metro-North Railroad's Hudson Line merges with the Empire Corridor in Spuyten Duyvil, Bronx, just south of Riverdale, providing commuter rail service between Poughkeepsie, New York and Grand Central Terminal in New York City.

The line is electrified by both overhead catenary and top-running third rail on the Amtrak-owned segment between Penn Station and 41st Street, as well as by under-running third rail on the Metro-North segment, from the merge with the Hudson Line to Croton–Harmon. The Amtrak-owned section between 41st Street and the merge with the Hudson Line is unpowered, and can only be served by diesel or dual-mode trains.

The corridor is also one of ten federally designated high-speed rail corridors in the United States. If the proposed high-speed service were to be built on the corridor, trains traveling between Buffalo and New York City could travel at speeds of up to 125 mph (201 km/h). In the 1890s, the Empire State Express between New York City and Buffalo was about 1 hour faster than Amtrak's service in 2013. On September 14, 1891, the Empire State Express covered the 436 miles (702 km) between New York City and Buffalo in 7 hours and 6 minutes (including stops), averaging 61.4 mph (98.8 km/h), with a top speed of 82 mph (132 km/h).

== Ownership ==
The Empire Corridor is largely owned by CSX Transportation (CSX), which owns most of the trackage between Niagara Falls and Poughkeepsie. Amtrak owns trackage rights for most of the Hudson line section north of Poughkeepsie to its rail yard in Albany. South of Poughkeepsie, the Empire Corridor is coextensive with Metro-North's trackage until it forks-off between Metro-North's Riverdale and Spuyten Duyvil stations in the Bronx, to cross the Harlem River over the Spuyten Duyvil Bridge and make the Empire Connection to Penn Station. Amtrak owns the trackage after that fork, the West Side Line.

The corridor had been part of the main line of the New York Central Railroad; it was the eastern leg of the NYC's famed "Water Level Route" to Chicago. The corridor passed to Penn Central in 1968 upon the NYC's merger with the Pennsylvania Railroad, and passed to Conrail in 1976. In a series of purchases in the 1980s and 1990s, Amtrak bought the Bronx–Manhattan segment, Metro-North acquired the Poughkeepsie–Bronx segment, and CSX acquired the remainder when it split Conrail's assets with Norfolk Southern, in 1999.

On October 18, 2011, Amtrak and CSX announced an agreement for Amtrak to lease, operate and maintain the CSX-owned trackage between Poughkeepsie and Schenectady. Amtrak officially assumed control of the line on December 1, 2012. Later, Amtrak bought the segment between Schenectady and Hoffmans to its west from CSX.

== Current services ==
The busiest segment of the Empire Corridor is between New York City and Albany with twelve trains per day.

=== Amtrak ===
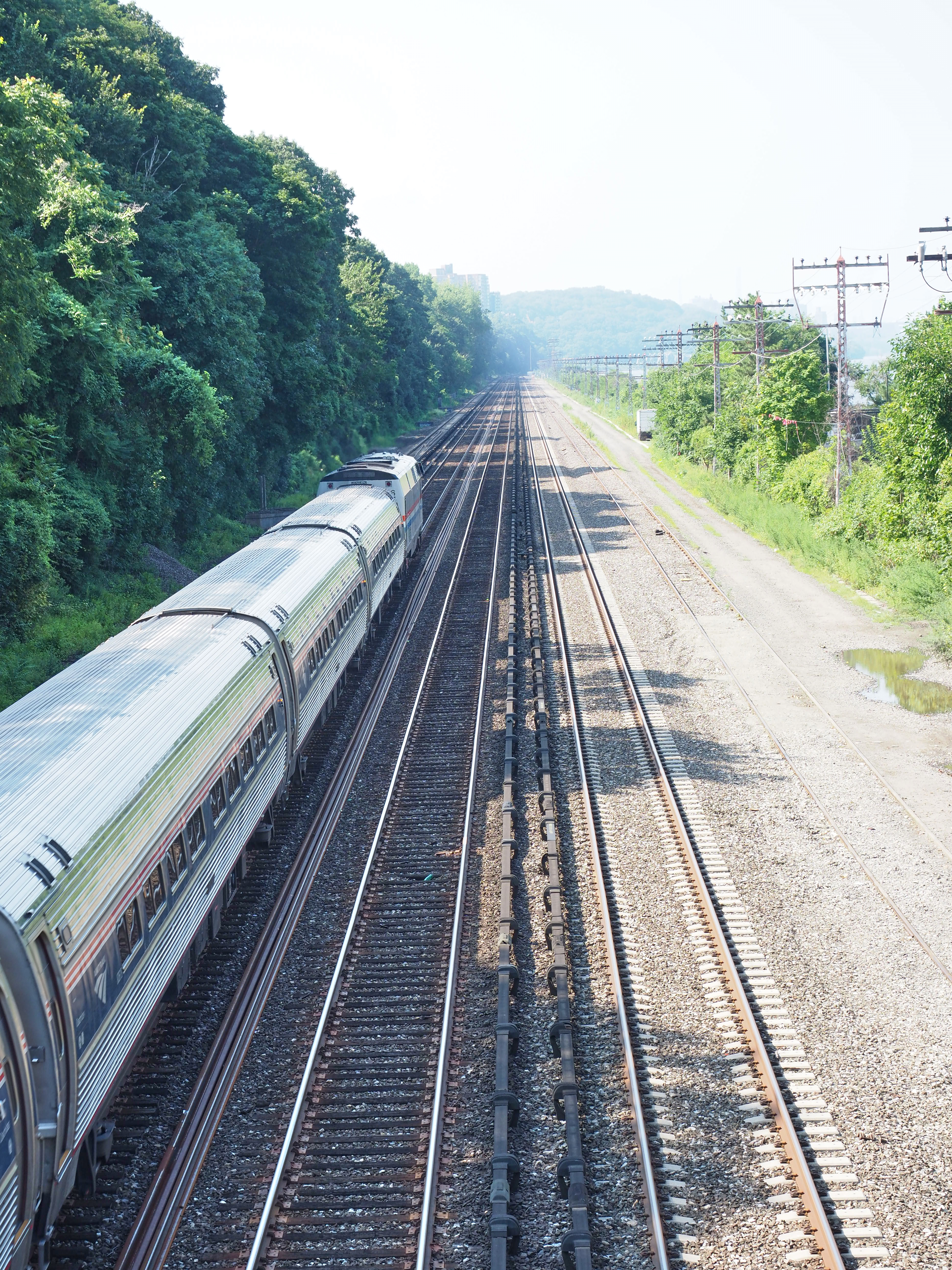
Southbound Amtrak train on Hudson line tracks, just south of Riverdale Station. Looking south from 254th street bridge, Riverdale, Bronx, NY

The following trains operate along the varied segments of the corridor:

- Empire Service: local service along the entire corridor from New York City to Niagara Falls, NY. Most trains operate along the southern segment between New York and Albany–Rensselaer, with three trains in each direction continuing west to Niagara Falls daily.
- Maple Leaf: daily service from New York City to Toronto, operating on the entire corridor.
- Lake Shore Limited: daily service from New York City to Chicago, splitting from the corridor at Buffalo–Depew. A section of this train splits-off at Albany–Rensselaer to serve Boston.
- Adirondack: daily service from New York City to Montreal, splitting from the corridor in Schenectady.
- Ethan Allen Express: daily service from New York City to Burlington, splitting from the corridor in Schenectady.
- Berkshire Flyer: weekly summer service between New York City and Pittsfield, reversing direction and splitting from the corridor at Albany–Rensselaer.

=== Commuter rail ===
- Metro-North Railroad's Hudson Line, from Poughkeepsie, New York to Grand Central Terminal, New York, comprises the corridor between Poughkeepsie to south of Riverdale.

=== Freight service ===
Freight service is provided by CSX Transportation.

== Stations ==
All stations are in the state of New York. Once a service leaves the corridor or terminates entirely along the way, its cells are filled in black.

| Location | Mile (km) | Station | Current station opened | Corridor services | | | | | | | Connections |
| Location | Mile (km) | Station | Current station opened | ES | ML | LS | AD | EA | BF | HD | Connections |
|---|---|---|---|---|---|---|---|---|---|---|---|
| Niagara Falls | 461 (742) | Niagara Falls | December 6, 2016 | ● | ● | | | | | | NFTA Bus: 52 |
| Buffalo | 437 (703) | Buffalo–Exchange Street | November 8, 2020 | ● | ● | | | | | | NFTA: Metro Rail (at Canalside station); NFTA Bus: 14, 16, 42, 74; Amtrak Thruway to Jamestown |
| Depew | 431 (694) | Buffalo–Depew | October 28, 1979 | ● | ● | ● | | | | | NFTA Bus: 46 |
| Rochester | 370 (600) | Louise M. Slaughter; Rochester Station | October 6, 2017 | ● | ● | ● | | | | | RTS: 37, 41 |
| Syracuse | | New York State Fair | August 22, 2002 | ● | ● | | | | | | (seasonal) |
| Syracuse | 291 (468) | William F. Walsh; Regional Transportation Center | August 1998 | ● | ● | ● | | | | | CENTRO: 16, 48, 50, 60, 62, 70, 82, 236, 246, 250 |
| Rome | 250 (400) | Rome | 1914 | ● | ● | | | | | | CENTRO of Oneida: 4, 7 |
| Utica | 237 (381) | Utica Union Station | May 24, 1914 | ● | ● | ● | | | | | Adirondack Scenic Railroad to Thendara; CENTRO of Oneida: 12; Birnie Bus Services, Adirondack Trailways, Chenango Valley Bus Company, Greyhound Lines |
| Amsterdam | 177 (285) | Amsterdam | 1973 | ● | ● | | | | | | |
| Schenectady | 159 (256) | Schenectady | October 17, 2018 | ● | ● | ● | ● | ● | | | CDTA: 353, 354, 355, 370, 602, 605, 763, 905 BusPlus |
| Rensselaer | 141 (227) | Albany–Rensselaer | September 22, 2002 | ● | ● | ● | ● | ● | ● | | CDTA: 114, 214; Vermont Translines |
| Hudson | 114 (183) | Hudson | 1874 | ● | ● | | ● | ● | ● | | Columbia County Public Transportation: Hudson–Albany Shuttle |
| Rhinecliff | 100 (160) | Rhinecliff | 1914 | ● | ● | ● | ● | ● | ● | | |
| Poughkeepsie | 80 (130) | Poughkeepsie | February 18, 1918 | ● | ● | ● | ● | ● | ● | ● | Dutchess County Public Transit: A, B, C, D, E, H, J, K, L, RailLink; UCAT: KPL, UPL |
| New Hamburg | 71.5 (115.1) | New Hamburg | October 17, 1981 | | | | | | | ● | Dutchess County Public Transit: RailLink |
| Beacon | 65.5 (105.4) | Beacon | 1915 | | | | | | | ● | Dutchess County Public Transit: B, G; Leprechaun Lines: Newburgh-Beacon Shuttle; Newburgh–Beacon Ferry |
| Cold Spring | 61.5 (99.0) | Breakneck Ridge | | | | | | | | ● | |
| Cold Spring | 59 (95) | Cold Spring | 1893 | | | | | | | ● | Putnam Transit: Cold Spring Trolley |
| Garrison | 56.4 (90.8) | Garrison | 1892 | | | | | | | ● | |
| Garrison | 52.5 (84.5) | Manitou | 1983 | | | | | | | ● | |
| Peekskill | 47.7 (76.8) | Peekskill | 1874 | | | | | | | ● | Bee-Line Bus: 16, 18, 31 |
| Montrose | 44.9 (72.3) | Cortlandt | 1996 | | | | | | | ● | Bee-Line Bus: 14 |
| Croton-on-Hudson | 39.7 (63.9) | Croton–Harmon | 1988 | ● | ● | ● | ● | ● | ● | ● | Bee-Line Bus: 10, 11, 14 |
| Ossining | 37.3 (60.0) | Ossining | 1914 | | | | | | | ● | Bee-Line Bus: 13, 13B, 19; Haverstraw–Ossining Ferry |
| Briarcliff Manor | 36 (58) | Scarborough | 1851 | | | | | | | ● | |
| Sleepy Hollow | 33 (53) | Philipse Manor | January 30, 1911 | | | | | | | ● | |
| Tarrytown | 31.7 (51.0) | Tarrytown | 1925 | | | | | | | ● | Hudson Link: H07, H07X; Bee-Line Bus: 1T, 13, T |
| Irvington | 29.2 (47.0) | Irvington | 1889 | | | | | | | ● | |
| Irvington | 28.2 (45.4) | Ardsley-on-Hudson | c. 1896 | | | | | | | ● | |
| Dobbs Ferry | 27.2 (43.8) | Dobbs Ferry | 1899 | | | | | | | ● | Bee-Line Bus: 1, 6 |
| Hastings-on-Hudson | 26 (42) | Hastings-on-Hudson | 1910 | | | | | | | ● | Bee-Line Bus: 6, 1C, 1T, & 1W |
| Yonkers | 24.3 (39.1) | Greystone | 1899 | | | | | | | ● | Bee-Line Bus: 6, 1C, 1T, & 1W |
| Yonkers | 22.7 (36.5) | Glenwood | | | | | | | | ● | Bee-Line Bus: 1C, 1T, & 1W |
| Yonkers | 21.6 (34.8) | Yonkers | 1911 | ● | ● | | ● | ● | ● | ● | Bee-Line Bus: 6, 9, 25, 32, 91 (seasonal) |
| Yonkers | 20.8 (33.5) | Ludlow | | | | | | | | ● | Bee-Line Bus: 32 |
| The Bronx | 19.5 (31.4) | Riverdale | | | | | | | | ● | Hudson Rail Link: A, B, C, D |
| New York | 0 (0) | Penn Station | 1968 | ● | ● | ● | ● | ● | ● | | Amtrak (long-distance): Cardinal, Crescent, Palmetto, Silver Meteor; Amtrak (intercity): Acela, Carolinian, Keystone Service, Maple Leaf, Northeast Regional, Pennsylvanian, Vermonter; LIRR: ■ Main Line, ■ Port Washington Branch; NJ Transit: ■ North Jersey Coast Line, ■ Northeast Corridor Line, ■ Gladstone Branch, ■ Montclair–Boonton Line, ■ Morristown Line; NYC Subway: PATH: HOB-33 JSQ-33 JSQ-33 (via HOB); NYC Transit buses: M7, M20, M34 SBS, M34A SBS, Q32, SIM23, SIM24 |

== See also ==
- New York high-speed rail
- High-speed rail in the United States
- West Side Line
