= Empire Service =

Amtrak service between New York City and upstate New York

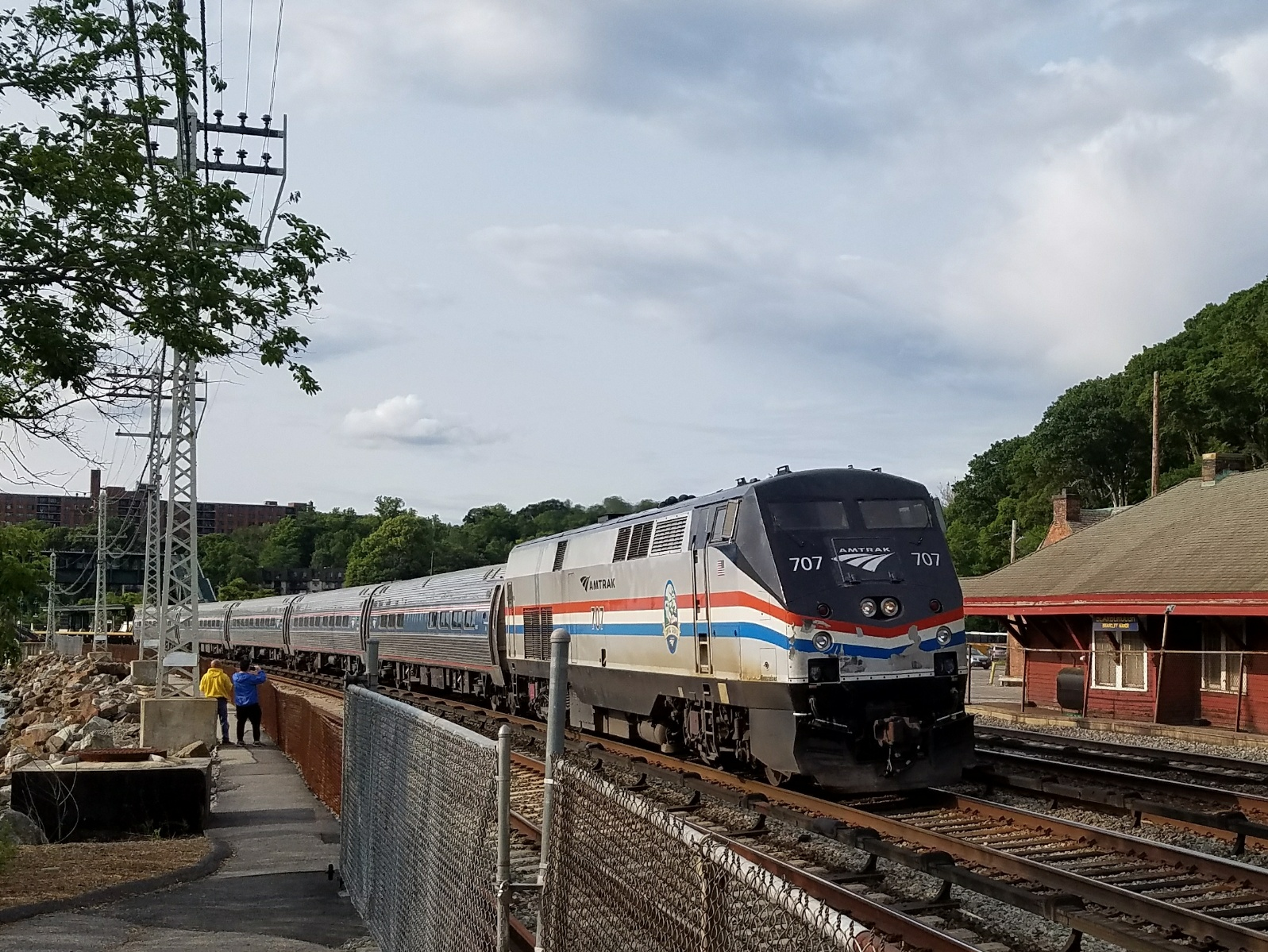
- An Empire Service train passing through Briarcliff Manor, New York in June 2023.

Overview
- Service type: Inter-city rail
- Locale: New York
- Predecessor: New York Central corridor trains
- First service: December 3, 1967
- Current operator: Amtrak in partnership with NYSDOT
- Former operators: New York Central Railroad (1967–1968); Penn Central (1968–1971)
- Annual ridership: 1,351,223 (Albany–NYC, FY 25) ▲0.5% (Note: Amtrak's Fiscal Year (FY) runs from October 1 of the prior year to September 30 of the named year.); 464,421 (Toronto–Albany, FY 25) ▼ -8.3% (Note: Toronto–Albany: combines Empire Service and Maple Leaf ridership.)

Route
- Termini: Niagara Falls, New York; New York City, New York
- Stops: 16
- Distance travelled: 460 miles (740 km)
- Average journey time: 8 hours, 51–58 minutes
- Service frequency: Twelve daily round trips (Albany–NYC); Three daily round trips (Niagara Falls–NYC)
- Train number: 230, 232–241, 243–245, 250, 252–253, 256–257, 259–261, 280–281, 283–284

On-board services
- Classes: Coach Class; Business Class
- Disabled access: All cars, all stations
- Catering facilities: Café car
- Baggage facilities: Overhead racks

Technical
- Rolling stock: Amfleet coaches
- Track gauge: 4 ft 8 1/2 in (1,435 mm) standard gauge
- Operating speed: 52 mph (84 km/h) (avg.); 110 mph (180 km/h) (top)
- Track owners: MNRR, Amtrak, CSX

The Empire Service is an inter-city rail service operated by Amtrak within the state of New York in the United States. The brand name originated with the New York Central Railroad in 1967. Trains on the line provide frequent daily service along the 460-mile (740 km) Empire Corridor between New York City and Niagara Falls via Albany, the state capital.

During fiscal year 2018, the Empire Service carried 1,150,498 passengers on the line between New York City and Albany, while services between Albany and points west, including the Maple Leaf and Lake Shore Limited, carried an additional 366,696. Ticket revenue on the New York City–Albany section in FY2016 was $49,361,545, an increase of 1.4% from FY2015, while revenue on the Albany–Toronto route was $22,143,803.

== Services ==
Approximately hourly weekday service is available on the southern portion of the line between New York Penn Station and Albany–Rensselaer. As of the April 2024 timetable, the route operates nine round trips on most days – seven between New York City and Albany, and two between New York City and Niagara Falls.

The corridor is served by four additional Amtrak trains each day:

- The Maple Leaf, which runs along the entire corridor before continuing across Central and Western New York and on to Toronto
- The Lake Shore Limited, which follows the corridor through central and western New York as far as Buffalo–Depew en route to Chicago, with one section breaking off at Albany to serve Massachusetts en route to Boston.
- The Adirondack to Montreal and Ethan Allen Express to Burlington supplement service on the southern portion of the line between New York City and Albany. Both follow the corridor as far as Schenectady.

Downstate, in the Hudson Valley, the portion of the route from Poughkeepsie southward is shared with the Metro-North Railroad's Hudson Line, and sees frequent commuter service, with connections to the Empire Service at Poughkeepsie, Croton-Harmon, and Yonkers.

The Empire Service is one of four New York-based train routes that Amtrak operates with funding from the New York State Department of Transportation with the other three routes being the Adirondack, Maple Leaf, and Ethan Allen Express.

== History ==
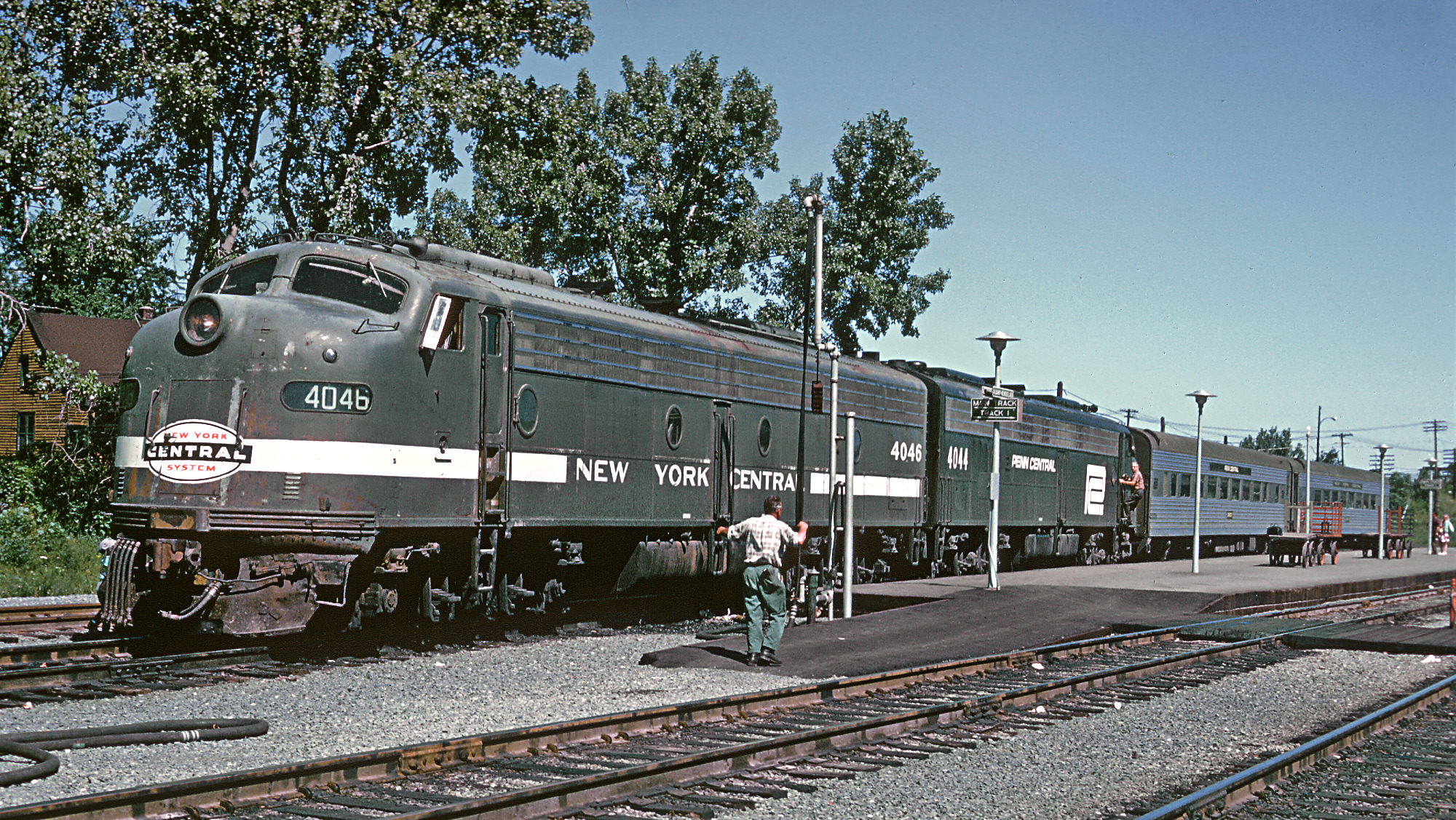
A battered Penn Central EMD E8 leads another E8 and two coaches at Albany-Rensselaer in 1969

Today's Empire Service is the descendant of numerous routes dating to 1869, when Cornelius Vanderbilt merged his Hudson River Railroad (forerunner of today's Metro-North Hudson Line) with the New York Central Railroad (NYC), thus linking New York City with Albany.

Its route is largely coextensive with what was once the NYC's main line, which was the eastern portion of the "Water Level Route" from New York City to Chicago. The Buffalo-Niagara Falls leg was formerly part of an NYC subsidiary, the Buffalo and Niagara Falls Railroad, but passenger service was dropped in 1961.

On December 3, 1967, just months before its merger with the Pennsylvania Railroad to become the Penn Central Transportation Company, the Central reorganized all its passenger routes. All trains along the New York City-Buffalo corridor were consolidated under the Empire Service brand. Marketing emphasized convenient service within the state, with a reduced emphasis on long-distance trains which continued west of Buffalo. This program continued after the Penn Central merger. The new scheduling produced mixed results; passengers were deterred by the poor quality of the passenger cars and the inconvenient locations of stations along the route.

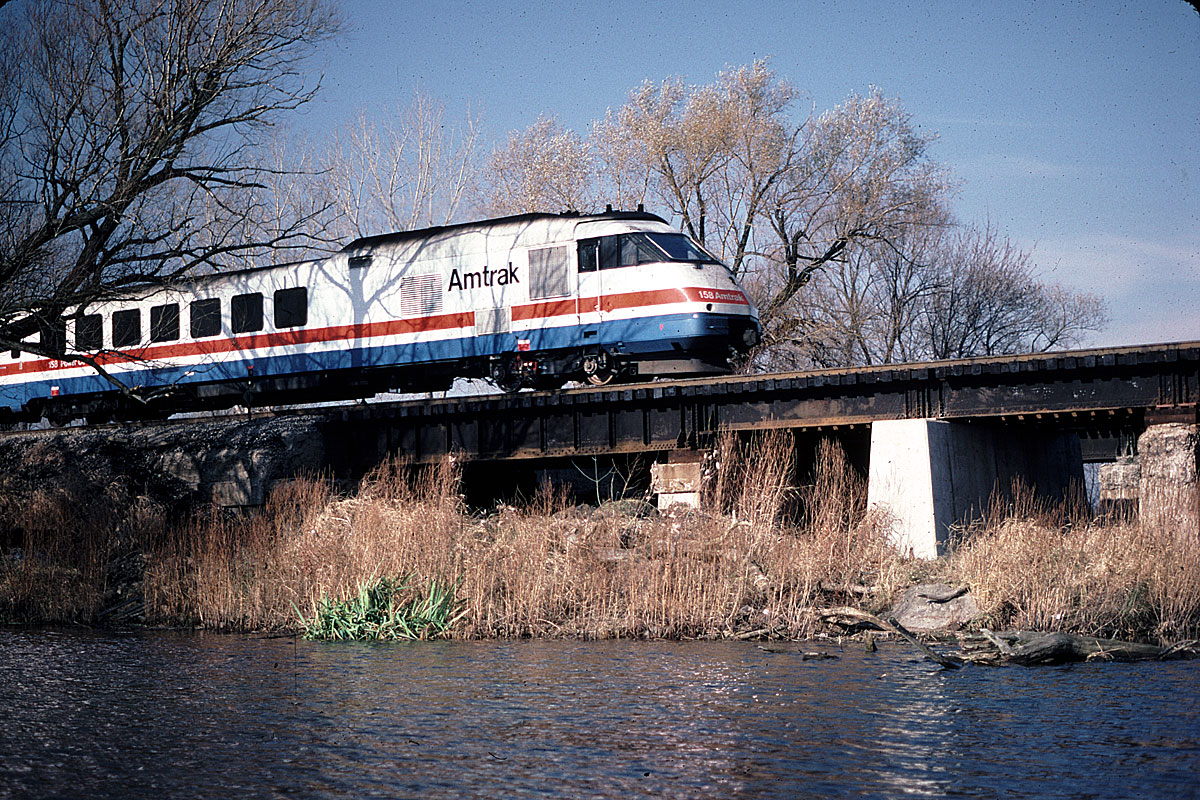
Amtrak once operated Turboliners on the Empire Corridor. Here the Mohawk crosses the Seneca River in 1984.

Penn Central handed the Empire Service, along with most of its other routes, to Amtrak on May 1, 1971. Initially, Amtrak retained seven daily trains on the New York City–Albany–Buffalo corridor: four operated from New York City to Albany, and three ran through to Buffalo. All service west of Buffalo was discontinued. All trains retained their ex-Penn Central numbers and were otherwise nameless. Westward service resumed briefly after May with the introduction of the Chicago–New York City Lake Shore, but this train was canceled on January 6, 1972.

The Empire Service name was restored on June 11, 1972, and individual names were added to the trains along the corridor on May 19, 1974.

Despite doubts about Amtrak's potential success, the company was key in reestablishing some discontinued services along the Empire Corridor. Service beyond Buffalo to Niagara Falls was reestablished with such trains as the Niagara Rainbow and the Maple Leaf. In addition Amtrak restored service to downtown Schenectady in 1978, a service which Penn Central had discontinued in 1968, for all Empire Service trains that continued beyond Albany. Service was restored permanently on the old Water Level Route with the reintroduction of the old New York Central train, the Lake Shore Limited, on October 31, 1975.

On April 7, 1991, all Amtrak Empire Service trains started using the new Empire Connection into New York Penn. Prior to that change, all passenger trains from Albany and beyond originated and terminated at Grand Central Terminal, forcing passengers traveling to the Northeast Corridor to transfer via shuttle bus, taxicab, or via the New York City Subway to reach Penn Station. The move also saved Amtrak the expense of operating two stations in New York City.

All service along the Empire Corridor was consolidated under the Empire brand on October 28, 1995. The names were restored just a year later, only to be dropped again in 1999.

In October 2011, CSX and Amtrak reached an agreement for Amtrak to lease the Hudson Subdivision between Poughkeepsie and Hoffmans, west of Schenectady. Since 2012, Amtrak has effectively had operational control over the Hudson Subdivision, handling all maintenance and capital responsibilities. CSX retained freight rights over the line, which hosts only five freights a day.

In the Capital District, Amtrak has used federal funds to double-track the line between Rensselaer and Schenectady (which once had four tracks under the New York Central), and add an additional station track at the Albany–Rensselaer station. Amtrak sees the lease as key to improving Empire Service speeds and frequencies. Amtrak officially assumed control on December 1, 2012, with trains in the section now dispatched by the Amtrak Control and Command Center in New York City.

From July 10 through September 1, 2017, six Empire Service trains (three round trips) used Grand Central Terminal as part of Amtrak's work to make repairs at Penn Station. All trains using the Empire Connection, excluding the Lake Shore Limited, again operated into Grand Central Terminal from May 26 to September 4, 2018, to allow work on the Empire Tunnel, the Spuyten Duyvil movable bridge, and Track 19 in New York City's Penn Station.

In May 2018, the Massachusetts Senate approved funds for a two-year pilot of the Berkshire Flyer, a seasonal extension of a weekend Empire Service round trip to Pittsfield. The service, modeled on the CapeFLYER, would extend one New York City–Albany train to Pittsfield on Friday afternoons, with a return trip on Sunday afternoons. The trial was scheduled to begin in June 2020, but was delayed due to the COVID-19 pandemic and outstanding questions around the program's legal sponsorship. After delays due to the COVID-19 pandemic in the United States, the pilot was rescheduled for summer 2022 and 2023, with the first trip on July 8, 2022.

Service along the southern portion was disrupted for several days in November 2023. Increased inspection and regulation that followed an April 2023 parking garage collapse resulted in the discovery of similar structural issues at another garage overlying the tracks in Manhattan. One round trip was resumed on March 4, 2024, restoring service to pre-COVID levels. Service was reduced to eight round trips on November 10, 2024, due to construction work in the East River Tunnels limiting capacity at Penn Station. One round trip was re-added from December 2, 2024, to April 28, 2025. As of October 2025, it is expected to resume on December 1, 2025.

== Operation ==
=== Equipment ===
==== Current ====
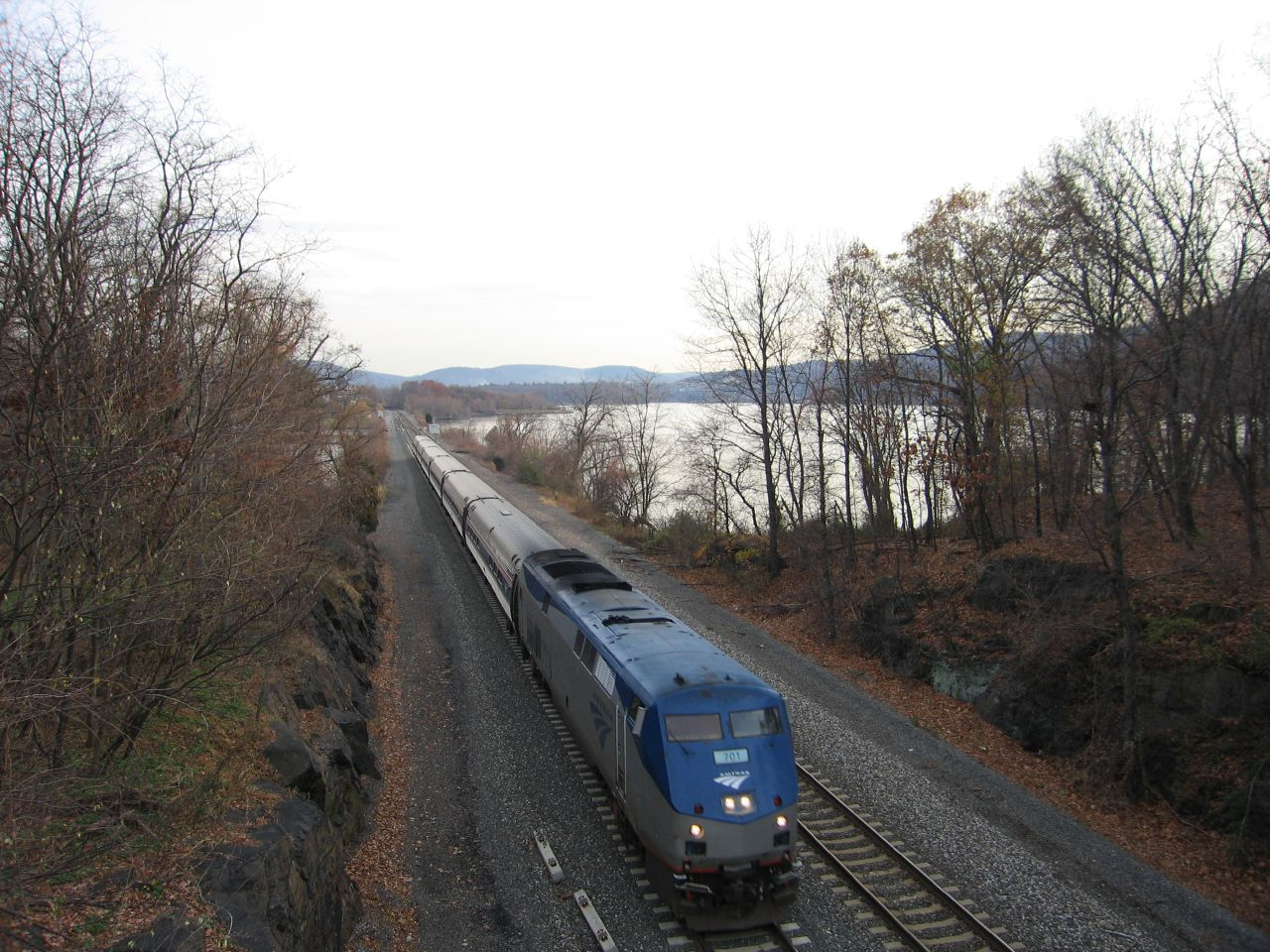
GE Genesis P32AC-DM No. 701 pulls an Empire Service through the Hudson Highlands along the Hudson River.

Most Empire Service trains consist of five unpowered coaches in various configurations of coach, café, and business class hauled by a single locomotive. The passenger cars are the Amfleet I series.. Most trains include an Amfleet club car which has a combination of Business Class seating with a Café (food service/lounge), plus four Coach Class cars. As of 2026, food service is only available on Empire Service trains that run the full route between Niagara Falls and New York City.

Between New York City and Albany–Rensselaer, trains are pulled by a GE Genesis P32AC-DM dual-mode diesel locomotive at speeds up to 110 mph (177 km/h). The locomotives operate on third rail electric power in Penn Station and the Empire Connection tunnel and on diesel power for the rest of the route. Between Albany–Rensselaer and Niagara Falls, traditional diesel-only GE Genesis locomotives are used.

==== Previous ====
The New York Central did not order new equipment for the Empire Service, preferring to rehabilitate existing equipment. 40 64-seat coaches, built by Pullman-Standard in 1946, were refurbished in 1967–1968. Another 21 coaches from the same pool were rebuilt as 50-seat "coach-buffet" cars. Amtrak acquired this equipment when it took over the Penn Central's passenger trains in 1971. The cars remained on the Empire Service under Amtrak into the mid-1970s. A typical train between New York City and Albany consisted of two coaches and the coach-buffet or "snack bar" coach. Trains which operated west of Albany had additional coaches.

==== Future ====
In the coming years, all equipment will be replaced with Amtrak Airo trainsets, the railroad's branding of its combination of Siemens Venture passenger cars and a Siemens Charger diesel-electric locomotive. The trainsets for the Empire Service will have six passenger cars, which will include a cab control car, food service area, and a mix of 2x2 Coach Class and 2x1 Business Class seating. The car closest to the locomotive will have batteries to supply electricity to traction motors in the locomotive when operating in Penn Station and the Empire Connection tunnel, eliminating the need for third rail propulsion. The arrangement will eliminate the time-consuming locomotive change at Albany–Rensselaer. Having cab controls at both ends of the train will also reduce turnaround time, as trainsets will no longer need to be looped or wyed to run the return trip.

=== Route ===
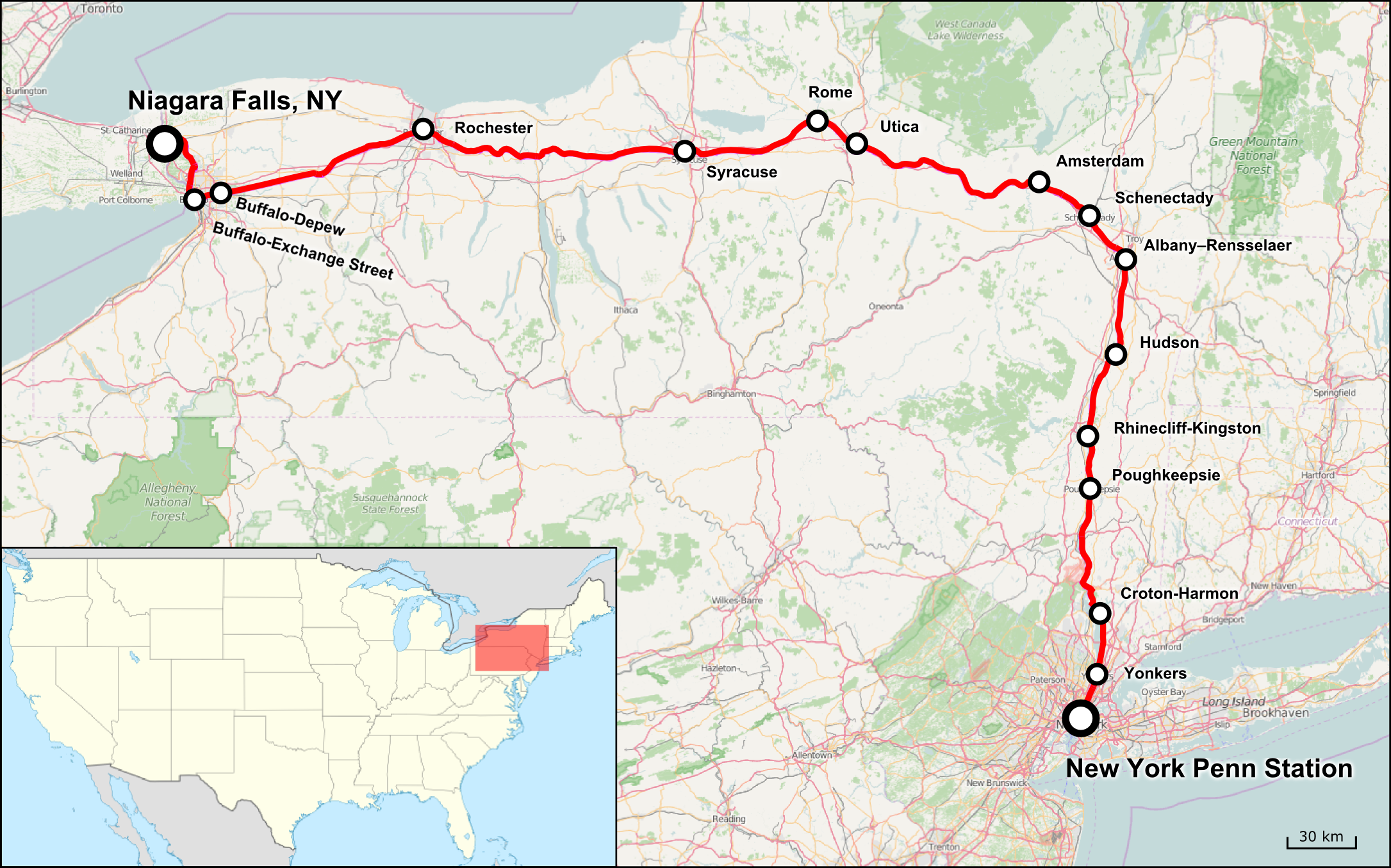
Empire Service map

The Empire Service operates over CSX Transportation, Metro-North Railroad, and Amtrak trackage:

- CSX trackage: Niagara Subdivision, Buffalo Terminal Subdivision, Rochester Subdivision, Mohawk Subdivision, Selkirk Subdivision, and Hudson Subdivision, Niagara Falls to Poughkeepsie (Amtrak-owned between Hoffmans and Schenectady, leased to Amtrak between Schenectady and Poughkeepsie)
- Metro-North Railroad: Hudson Line, Poughkeepsie to Spuyten Duyvil
- Amtrak: Empire Connection, Spuyten Duyvil to Penn Station

=== Stations ===
All stops are within the U.S. state of New York.

Location	Miles (km)	Station	Connections
Niagara Falls	461 (742)	Niagara Falls	Amtrak: Maple Leaf
Buffalo	437 (703)	Buffalo–Exchange Street	Amtrak: Maple Leaf, Amtrak Thruway to Jamestown; NFTA: Metro Rail
Depew	431 (694)	Buffalo–Depew	Amtrak: Maple Leaf, Lake Shore Limited
Rochester	370 (600)	Rochester	Amtrak: Maple Leaf, Lake Shore Limited
Syracuse		New York State Fair	(Train only stops during fair)
Syracuse	291 (468)	Syracuse	Amtrak: Maple Leaf, Lake Shore Limited; CENTRO
Rome	250 (400)	Rome	Amtrak: Maple Leaf
Utica	237 (381)	Utica Union Station	Amtrak: Maple Leaf, Lake Shore Limited; Adirondack Scenic Railroad; CENTRO: 15, 31
Amsterdam	177 (285)	Amsterdam	Amtrak: Maple Leaf
Schenectady	159 (256)	Schenectady	Amtrak: Adirondack, Ethan Allen Express, Maple Leaf, Lake Shore Limited; CDTA
Rensselaer	141 (227)	Albany–Rensselaer	Amtrak: Adirondack, Berkshire Flyer, Ethan Allen Express, Lake Shore Limited, Maple Leaf; CDTA
Hudson	114 (183)	Hudson	Amtrak: Adirondack, Berkshire Flyer, Ethan Allen Express, Maple Leaf
Rhinecliff	100 (160)	Rhinecliff	Amtrak: Adirondack, Berkshire Flyer, Ethan Allen Express, Lake Shore Limited, Maple Leaf
Poughkeepsie	80 (130)	Poughkeepsie	Amtrak: Adirondack, Berkshire Flyer, Ethan Allen Express, Lake Shore Limited, Maple Leaf; Metro-North Railroad: ■ Hudson Line; DCPT, UCAT
Croton-on-Hudson	40 (64)	Croton–Harmon	Amtrak: Adirondack, Berkshire Flyer, Ethan Allen Express, Lake Shore Limited, Maple Leaf; Metro-North Railroad: ■ Hudson Line; Bee-Line
Yonkers	18 (29)	Yonkers	Amtrak: Adirondack, Berkshire Flyer, Ethan Allen Express, Maple Leaf; Metro-North Railroad: ■ Hudson Line; Bee-Line
New York City	0	New York Penn Station	Amtrak (long-distance): Cardinal, Crescent, Lake Shore Limited, Palmetto, Silver Meteor; Amtrak (intercity): Acela, Adirondack, Berkshire Flyer, Carolinian, Ethan Allen Express, Keystone Service, Maple Leaf, Northeast Regional, Pennsylvanian, Vermonter; LIRR: ■ City Terminal Zone, ■ Port Washington Branch; NJ Transit: ■ North Jersey Coast Line, ■ Northeast Corridor Line, ■ Gladstone Branch, ■ Montclair–Boonton Line, ■ Morristown Line; NYC Subway: PATH: HOB-33 JSQ-33 JSQ-33 (via HOB); NYC Transit buses

== High-speed rail ==
The Empire Service has been a long-standing candidate for high-speed rail and electrification. The need for high-speed rail service has been addressed by former Governor George Pataki, former Senate Majority Leader Joseph Bruno, and members of the New York State Assembly who represent the upstate regions. Other politicians have asked that high-speed rail be introduced along the Empire Corridor, diminishing the time for New York City – Buffalo trains from seven hours to just three hours; train travel from New York City to Albany would take less than two hours to complete. This may introduce Acela trains to the Empire Corridor if high-speed rail is successful. Another reason, which politicians have noted, is that high-speed trains might help improve Upstate New York's economy, which had become stagnant.

Currently, trains attain a maximum speed of 110 mph (177 km/h) on the stretch of track just northwest of Albany. Areas east of Schenectady also see speeds above 79 mph (127 km/h). The overall average including stops is about 50 mph, taking nearly 9 hours to go 450 miles.
