= Rome railway station (disambiguation) =

Rome railway station or Rome station could refer to:

- Roma Termini railway station, the primary station in Rome, Italy
- Rome station (New York) in Rome, New York
- Rome station (Paris Metro), in Paris, France

== See also ==
- Category:Railway stations in Rome
