= Union Station (Utica, New York) =

Train station in New York, United States

Boehlert Transportation Center Utica, NY
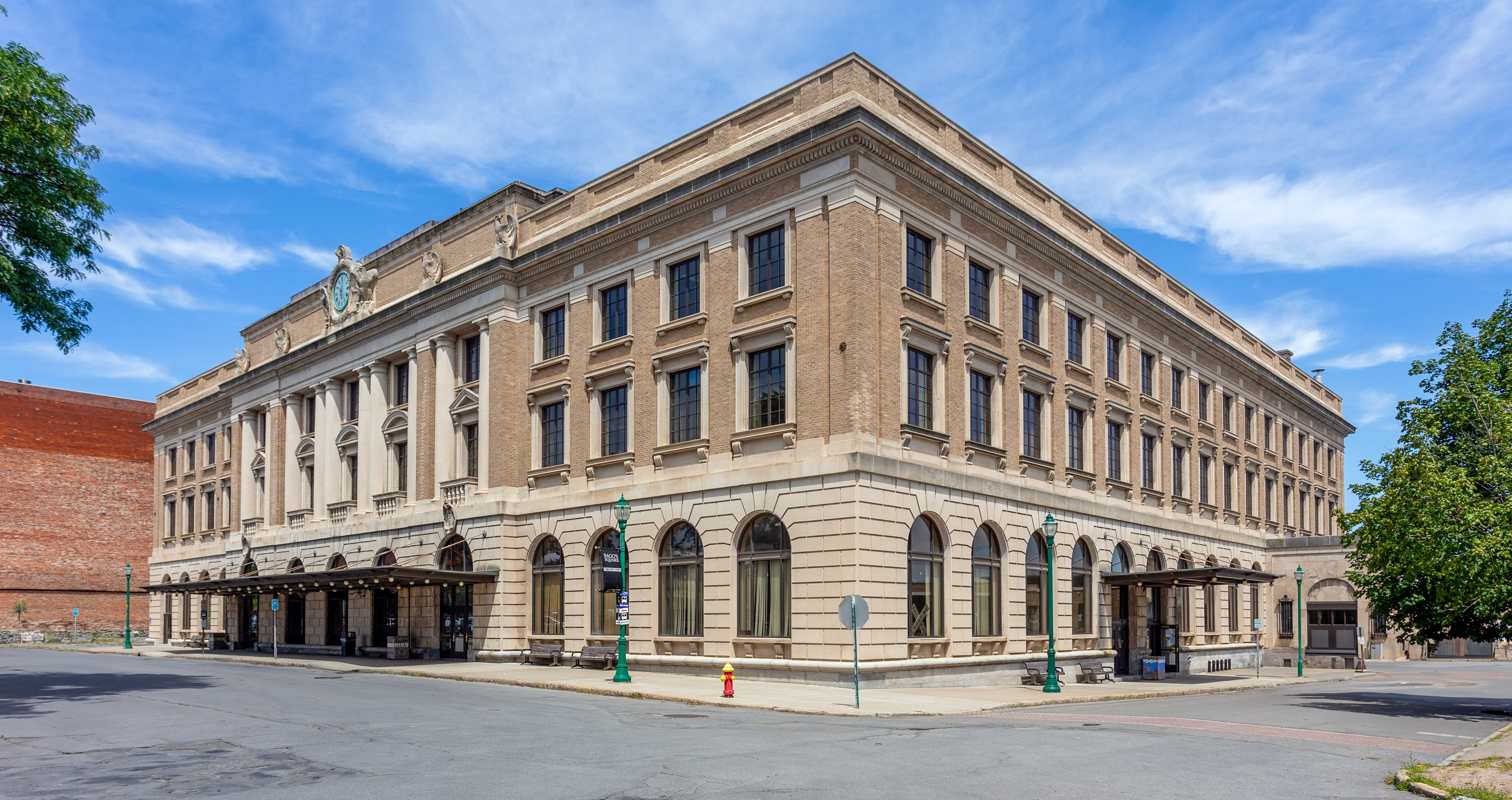
- Utica Union Station in 2021

General information
- Location: 321 Main Street; Utica, New York; United States
- Coordinates: 43.10416°N 75.22327°W
- Owner: Oneida County
- Lines: Empire Corridor (Mohawk Subdivision); Adirondack Railroad
- Platforms: 1 side platform, 1 island platform
- Tracks: 3
- Connections: CENTRO of Oneida: 12; Greyhound; Birnie Bus Service; Adirondack Trailways; Chenango Valley Bus Company

Construction
- Parking: Yes
- Accessible: Yes

Other information
- Station code: Amtrak: UCA; Via Rail: UTIC
- IATA code: ZUA

History
- Opened: April 1914
- Rebuilt: 1978

Passengers
- FY 2025: 83,975 (Amtrak)

Services
Preceding station	Amtrak	Following station
Rome toward Niagara Falls, New York	Empire Service	Amsterdam toward New York
Rome toward Toronto	Maple Leaf	Amsterdam toward New York
Syracuse toward Chicago	Lake Shore Limited	Schenectady toward New York or Boston South
Preceding station	Adirondack Railroad	Following station
Terminus	Main Line	Holland Patent toward Tupper Lake
Former services
Preceding station	Amtrak	Following station
Syracuse toward Chicago	Lake Shore	Colonie–Schenectady toward New York (Grand Central)
Rome toward Detroit (Michigan Central)	Niagara Rainbow	Amsterdam toward New York (Grand Central)
Preceding station	Delaware, Lackawanna and Western Railroad	Following station
Terminus	Utica Branch	New Hartford toward Binghamton
Preceding station	New York Central Railroad	Following station
Whitesboro toward Chicago	Main Line	North Frankfort toward New York
Terminus	Adirondack Division	Marcy toward Montreal
Terminus	St. Lawrence Division	Marcy toward Ogdensburg
Whitesboro after 1914 toward Buffalo–Exchange Street	River Division	South Utica toward Weehawken
Clark's Mills toward Buffalo–Exchange Street	River Division	South Utica toward Weehawken
- Union Station
- U.S. National Register of Historic Places
- Area: 1 acre (0.4 ha)
- Architect: Stem & Fellheimer
- Architectural style: Beaux Arts
- NRHP reference No.: 75001215
- Added to NRHP: April 28, 1975
Location

The Boehlert Transportation Center at Union Station is a train station served by Amtrak and the Adirondack Railroad in Utica, New York. It is owned by Oneida County, and named for retired U.S. Rep. Sherwood Boehlert (R-New Hartford).

The station was built in the Italianate style and includes a rusticated granite first story with buff brick above. Symmetrically rectangular in plan, there are thirteen bays across the façade and fifteen on the side elevations. A brick parapet crowns the building; over the main entrance is a large clock flanked by eagle sculptures. The Utica station was added to the National Register of Historic Places in 1975.

Inside is a restaurant and a barber shop, one of the few barber shops in a train station today. The 15,000-square-foot (1,400 m^{2}) waiting room's 47-foot-high (14 m) vaulted ceiling is supported by 34 marble columns. The station's blueprints called for the importing of columns that originally adorned Grand Central Terminal in New York City. Twelve large benches are heated by steam pipes and vents incorporated into the benches themselves.

A total of eight Amtrak trains use the station daily: two trains (one eastbound, one westbound) on the Lake Shore Limited, four trains (two in each direction) on the Empire Service, and two trains (one in each direction) on the Maple Leaf. In addition, the Adirondack Railroad operates a heritage railway from Utica to Holland Patent, Remsen and Thendara, New York, terminating in Tupper Lake on a seasonal basis.

== Station layout ==
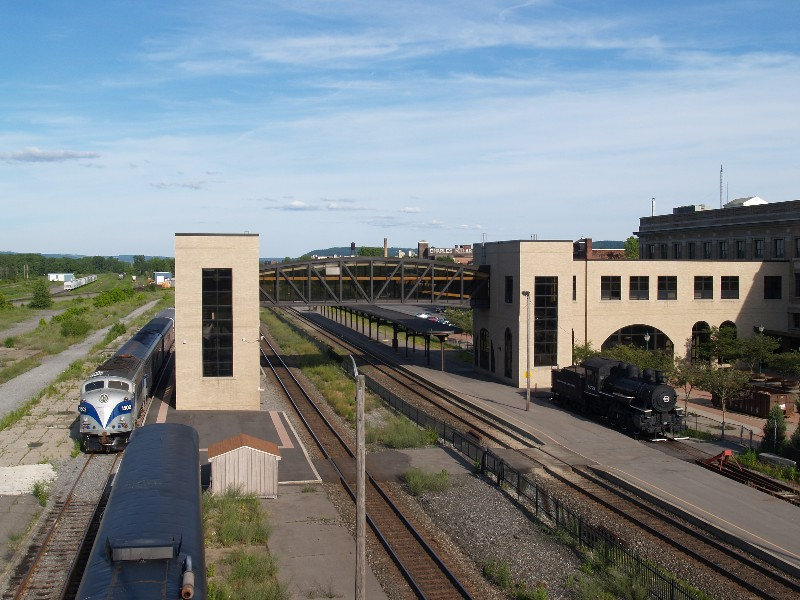
The rear of Union Station with an Adirondack Railroad train approaching

As it currently exists, Union Station has one side platform (originally the third island platform), accessible directly from the parking lot, serving eastbound Amtrak trains on Track 2 (the former Track 10); and one island platform (slightly widened from its original dimensions) serving westbound Amtrak trains on Track 1 (former Track 11) and Adirondack Railroad trains on the northern side (former Track 13). These are linked by an aerial walkway, constructed during station renovations at the turn of the 21st century.

== History ==
The station was built between 1912 and May 1914, replacing an older structure dating from 1869. The building was designed by New York architects Stem and Fellheimer. Construction involved the rerouting of the Mohawk River. The Mohawk River was relocated due to the risk of flooding and the proximity of the river to the railroad, which had become a problem for the expanding city. Built as a New York Central Railroad station, in 1915 it became tenanted by the Delaware, Lackawanna and Western Railroad and the New York, Ontario and Western Railway as well, those two companies abandoning their own stations.

At one time, the waiting room also contained three ticket windows, an information office, 15 pay telephones, a Western Union office, two shoeshine stands, and a bar and grill. The Western Union Office is no longer there.

As originally built, the station featured six island platforms with one alighting platform directly accessible from the station building, serving 12 tracks for New York Central Railroad trains; these were numbered 5 through 16 from south to north. (Tracks 1 and 2 were, respectively, the eastbound and westbound mainline for non-stop trains between Tracks 10 and 11, while Tracks 3 and 4 ran through the yards north of the station proper.) One additional dead-end island platform on the west side of the station building served the New York, Ontario and Western Railway (southern track) and Delaware, Lackawanna and Western Railroad (northern track), for a grand total of eight platforms serving 14 tracks. All platforms were linked by an underground passageway. The NYO&W ended its passenger service into Union Station between 1921 and 1932.

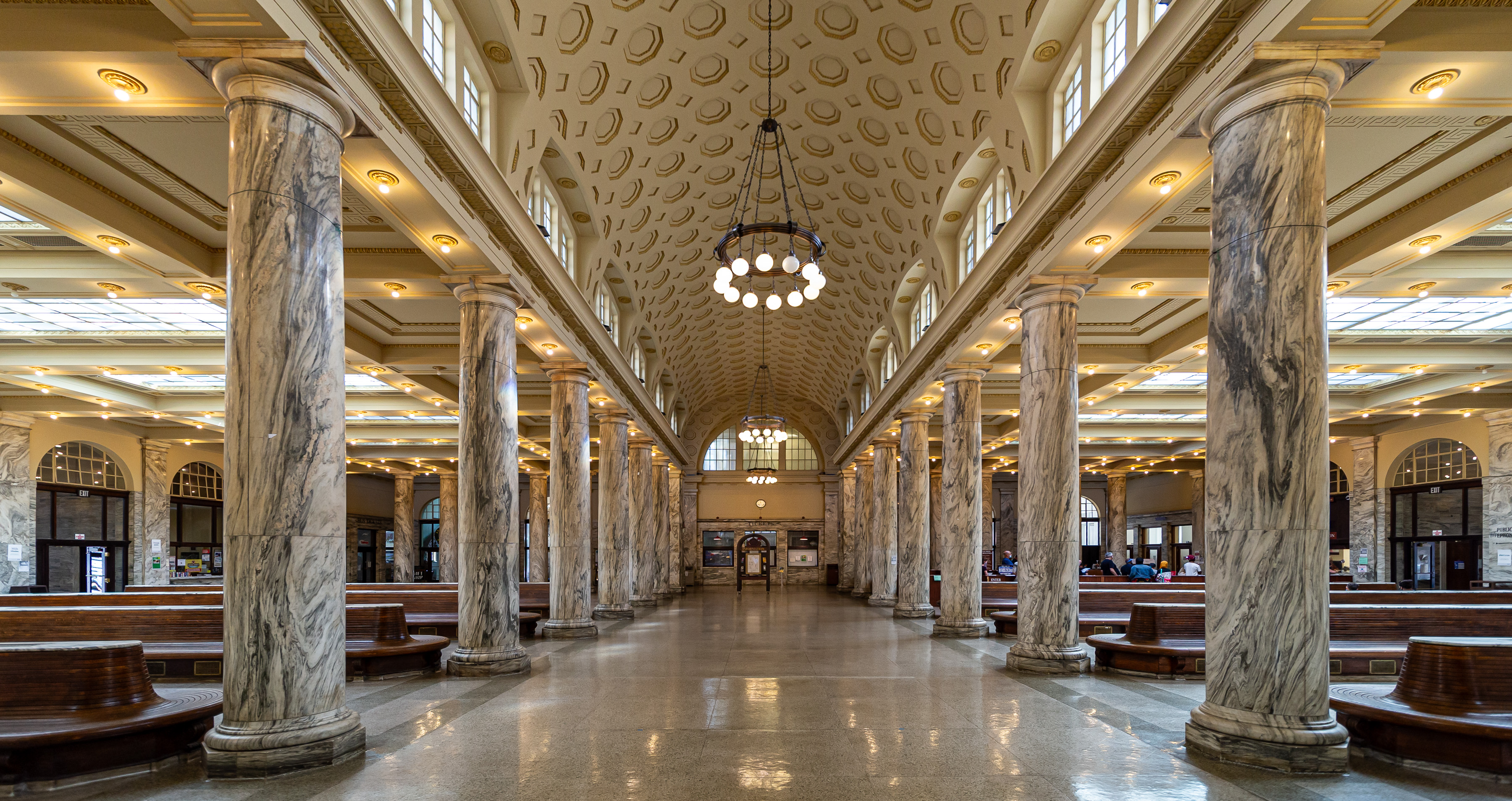
The restored interior in 2021

Post-WWII reductions in passenger traffic led to service cuts and the eventual bankruptcy of the remaining railroads, the Lackawanna and the New York Central. The last Lackawanna trains bound for Norwich and Binghamton left in 1950. Into the mid-1950s sleeper cars from the North Star and into the early 1960s the Iroquois went to Lake Placid from Union Station. The final NYC trains from Lake Placid on the Adirondack Division ran on April 24, 1965. By the late 1960s, only the mainline Water Level Route (the modern Amtrak Empire Corridor) continued to operate regular passenger service. Over time, all but the two centermost platforms were demolished, and the space originally occupied by the first seven station-side tracks was converted into passenger parking.

The interior of the large waiting room features extensive use of marble columns and revetments with terrazzo flooring throughout. The original waiting room benches, which incorporate steam pipes and vents, remain in use.

The station's restoration began in 1978, but refurbishing/restoration work continues to this day. The building is listed on the NRHP, both as a stand-alone item and as part of Bagg's Square East National Register Historic District.

== Popular culture ==
The station was featured in season 2, episode 9 of "Severance" on AppleTV+. The episode, which first aired in March 2025, had been filmed two years prior.

== Bus service ==
Bus companies serving the station, one of the first intermodal facilities in the state, include the following:

- CENTRO of Oneida
- Greyhound Lines
- Birnie Bus Services
- Adirondack Trailways
- Coach USA/Chenango Valley Bus Company
