= Amsterdam station (New York) =

Railway station in Amsterdam, New York

Amsterdam, NY
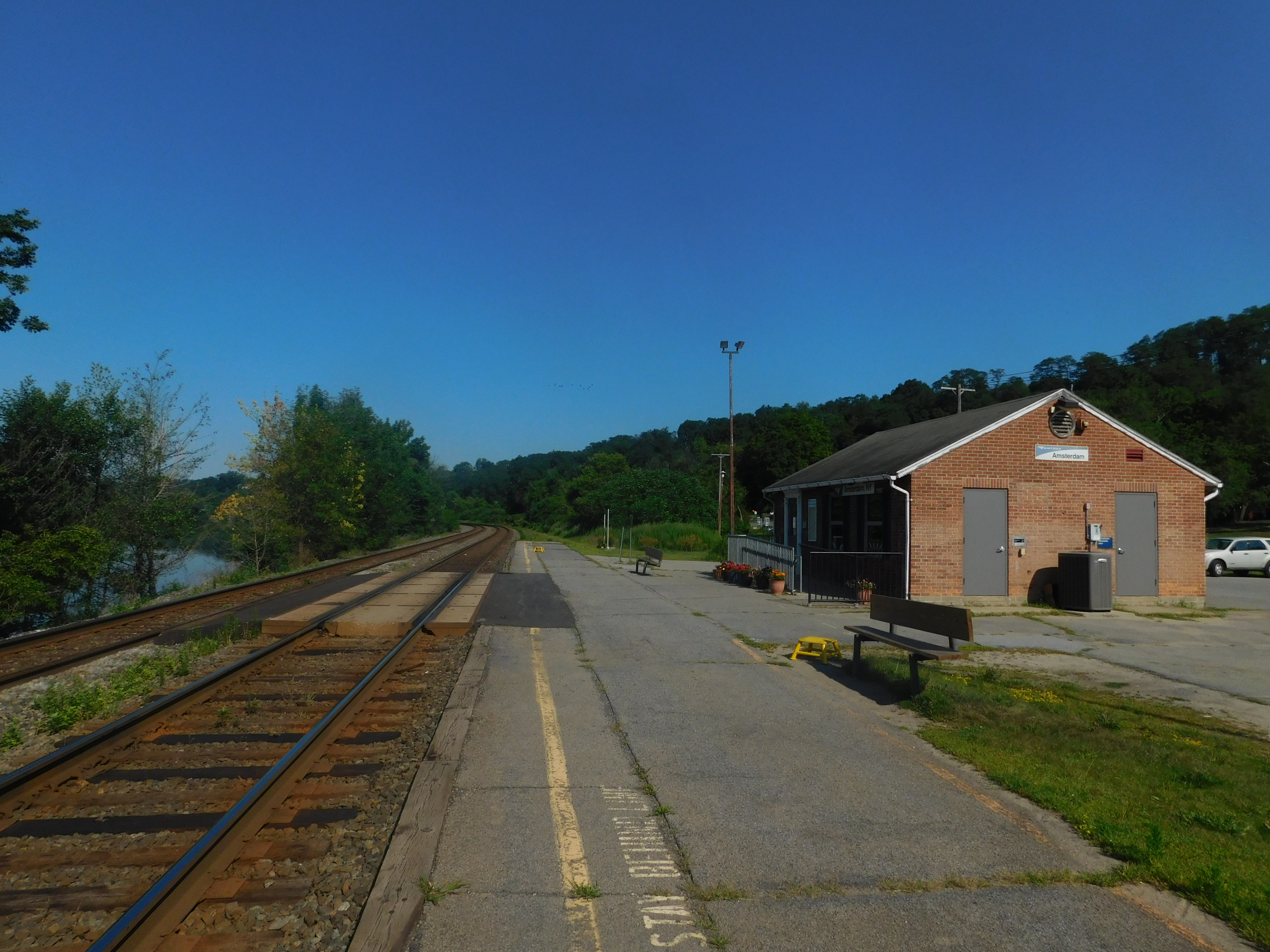
- Amsterdam station in August 2022

General information
- Location: 466 West Main Street (NY 5); Amsterdam, New York; United States
- Coordinates: 42°57′13″N 74°13′10″W
- Owner: Amtrak
- Line: Empire Corridor (Mohawk Subdivision)
- Platforms: 1 side platform
- Tracks: 2

Construction
- Parking: Yes; free
- Accessible: Yes

Other information
- Station code: Amtrak: AMS; Via Rail: AMST

History
- Opened: December 4, 1970

Passengers
- FY 2025: 13,737 (Amtrak)

Services
Preceding station	Amtrak	Following station
Utica toward Niagara Falls, New York	Empire Service	Schenectady toward New York
Utica toward Toronto	Maple Leaf	Schenectady toward New York
Lake Shore Limited does not stop here
Former services
Preceding station	Amtrak	Following station
Utica toward Detroit (Michigan Central)	Niagara Rainbow	Colonie–Schenectady toward New York (Grand Central)
Preceding station	Penn Central	Following station
Utica toward Buffalo	Buffalo–New York local	Colonie–Schenectady toward New York (Grand Central)
Location

Amsterdam station is an Amtrak train station in Amsterdam, New York. It is served by four daily Empire Service round trips plus the daily Maple Leaf; the Lake Shore Limited does not stop. In earlier eras, such as the postwar 1940s, no named trains from west of Syracuse stopped there.

Amsterdam station has a small unstaffed brick station building, with one low-level side platform on the north side of the two tracks.
