= Louise M. Slaughter Rochester Station =

Train station in Rochester, New York, U.S.

Rochester, NY
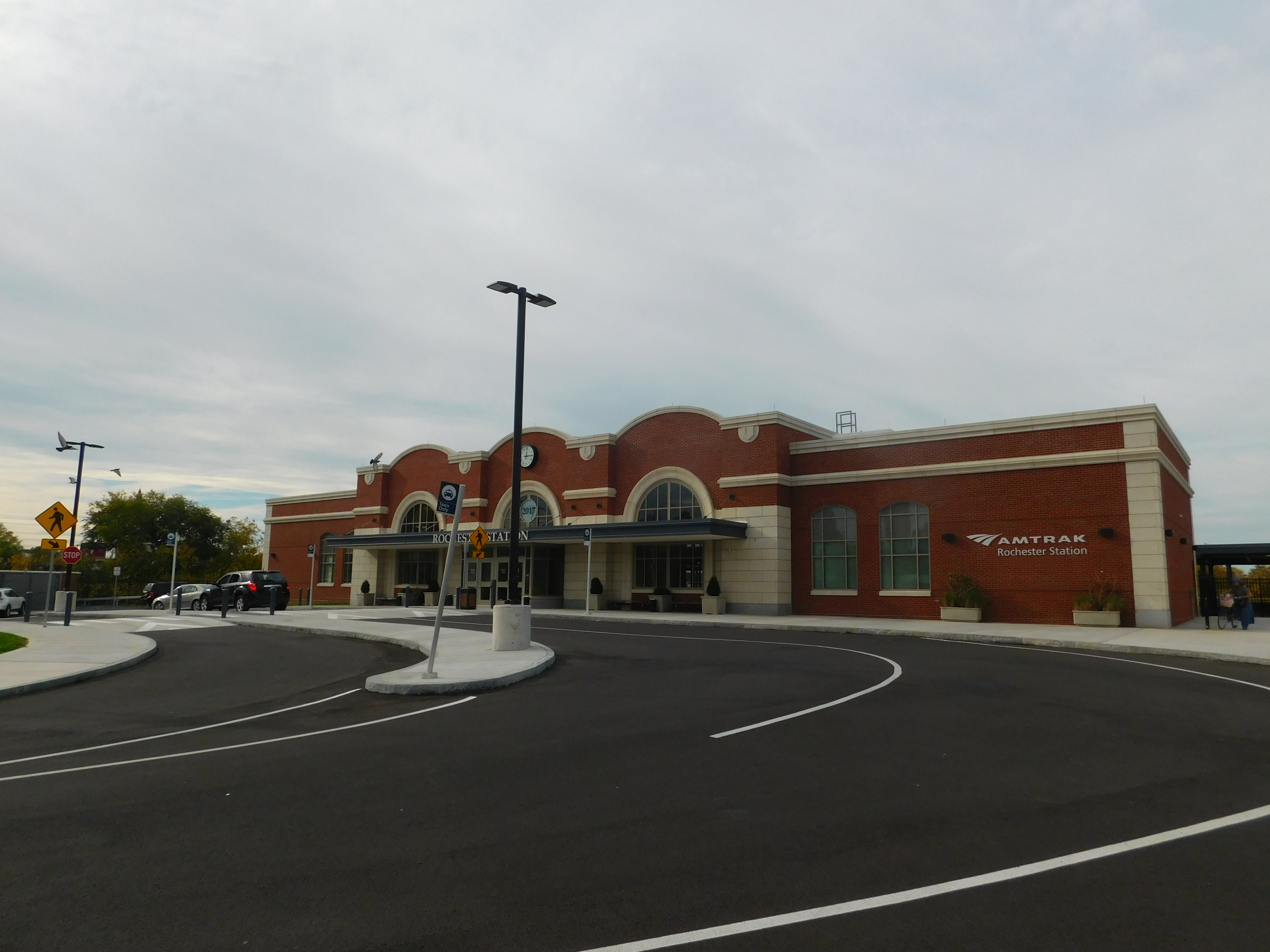
- The new Amtrak station in October 2017

General information
- Location: 320 Central Avenue; Rochester, New York; United States
- Coordinates: 43°09′49″N 77°36′30″W
- Owner: Amtrak
- Line: Empire Corridor (Rochester Subdivision)
- Platforms: 1 island platform (formerly 6 island platforms)
- Tracks: 4 (formerly 11)
- Connections: RTS: 2 North Clinton, 3 Joseph; Megabus; New York Trailways

Construction
- Parking: Yes
- Cycle facilities: Yes
- Accessible: Yes

Other information
- Station code: Amtrak: ROC; Via Rail: ROCH
- IATA code: ZTE

History
- Opened: Original depot: 1914; 112 years ago Amtrak facility: July 12, 1978
- Rebuilt: 2017

Passengers
- FY 2025: 153,125 (Amtrak)

Services
Preceding station	Amtrak	Following station
Buffalo–Depew toward Niagara Falls, New York	Empire Service	Syracuse toward New York
Buffalo–Depew toward Toronto	Maple Leaf	Syracuse toward New York
Buffalo–Depew toward Chicago	Lake Shore Limited	Syracuse toward New York or Boston South
New York State Fair services
Preceding station	Amtrak	Following station
Buffalo–Depew toward Niagara Falls, New York	Empire Service	New York State Fair toward New York
Buffalo–Depew toward Toronto	Maple Leaf	New York State Fair toward New York
Former services
Preceding station	Amtrak	Following station
Buffalo toward Chicago	Lake Shore	Syracuse toward New York (Grand Central)
Buffalo toward Detroit (Michigan Central)	Niagara Rainbow	Syracuse toward New York (Grand Central)
Preceding station	New York Central Railroad	Following station
Center Park toward Chicago	Main Line	Brighton toward New York
Center Park toward Niagara Falls, New York	Falls Road	Terminus
Terminus	Rochester – Oswego	Otis toward Oswego
Terminus	Auburn Road	Brighton toward Syracuse
Churchville Junction toward Buffalo–Exchange Street	River Division	Fairport toward Weehawken
Location

The Louise M. Slaughter Rochester Station is an Amtrak intermodal transit station in Rochester, New York. Local and regional bus transportation is provided by the Rochester-Genesee Regional Transportation Authority (branded RTS). Various taxi firms service the station, as well. The station is located on the north side of Rochester, just east of High Falls on the south side of the tracks.

Rochester is served by three Amtrak routes, totalling eight trains each day. The Lake Shore Limited operates one train in each direction daily between Chicago and Boston/New York City (via two sections east of Albany), while the Empire Service operates two trains in each direction between Niagara Falls and New York City, and the Maple Leaf serves the station with one train in each direction between Toronto and New York City. The station, opened in 2017, is the third train station to be built at the site.

== History ==
Rochester has a long history of train stations. The first major Rochester station was built in 1845 by the New York Central Railroad on Mill Street by High Falls.

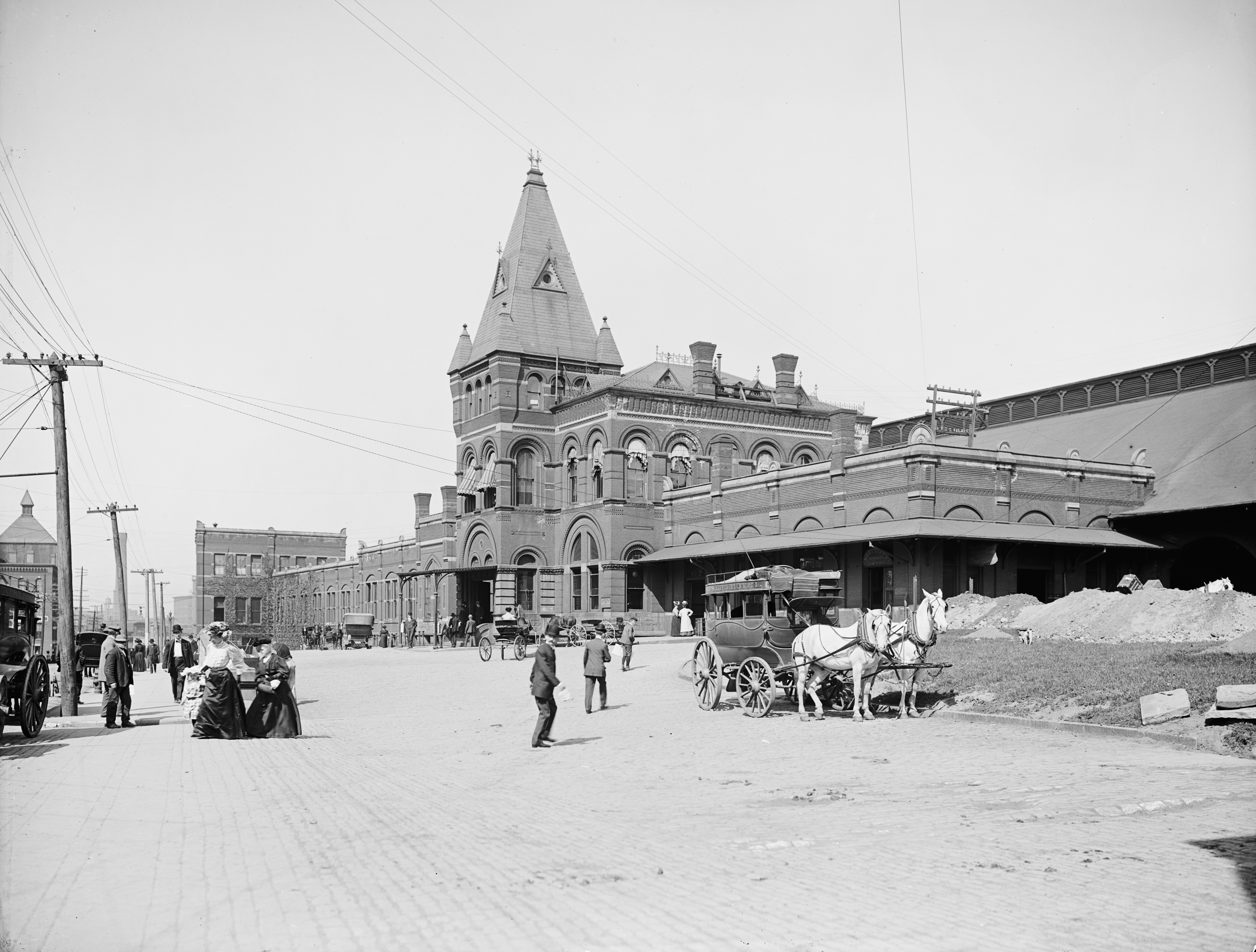
The 1882 New York Central Railroad station

In the 1880s, the railroad tracks were elevated (having previously been at grade) and in 1882 the station was relocated to the east side of the Genesee River, close to the modern station site on Central Avenue at St. Paul Street. This station was notable for its large train shed. Not long after the 1882 station was established, the city of Rochester had four major train stations: The New York Central station; the since demolished Erie Railroad Depot; the Lehigh Valley Railroad Station that houses Dinosaur Bar-B-Que; and the Rochester terminal of the Buffalo, Rochester, and Pittsburgh Railway that houses Nick Tahou Hots.

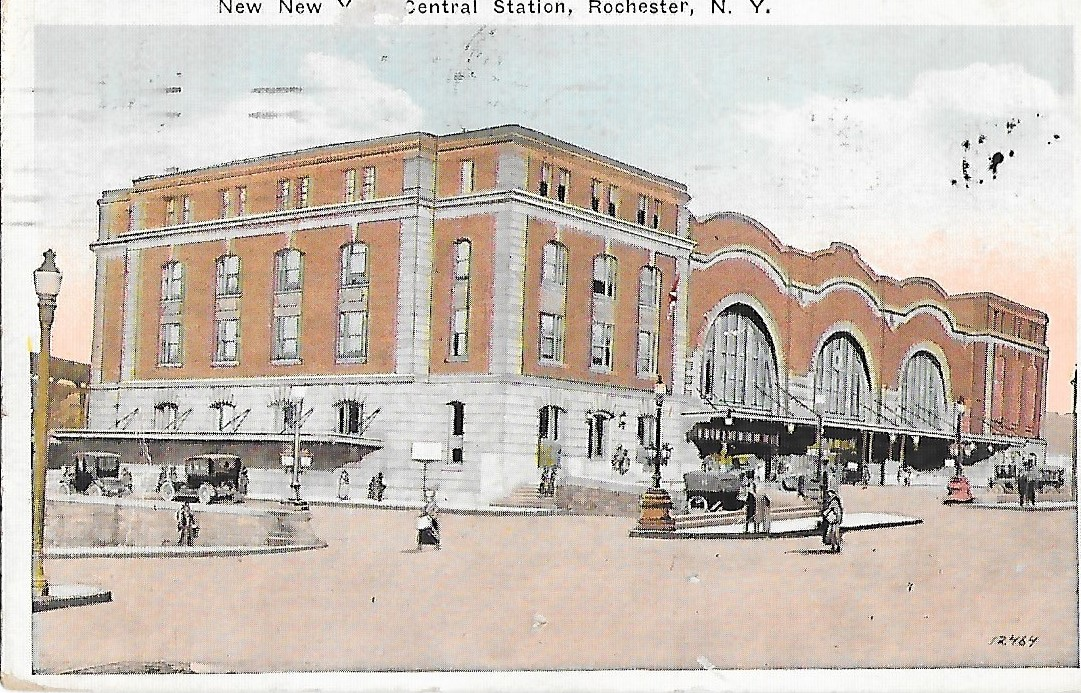
The 1914 New York Central Station known as Bragdon Station

The 1882 station would be demolished and replaced in 1914 at the modern site by the more famous New York Central station designed by Claude Fayette Bragdon. The station, often referred to as Bragdon Station, was four stories with three high arching windows reminiscent of train driving wheels and a main room that was reminiscent of New York's Grand Central Terminal complete with arched ceilings and a lunch counter. The station at its height had 6 island platforms connected to the main station building by two tunnels, one for passengers and one for baggage and mail that went all the way to the Cumberland St. Central Post Office. The station was seen as one of Bragdon's greatest architectural accomplishments. As was the case with several large stations of the era, with falling revenues and the high maintenance costs and taxes of such a large facility the station was sold by the New York Central Railroad in 1959 to a private owner.

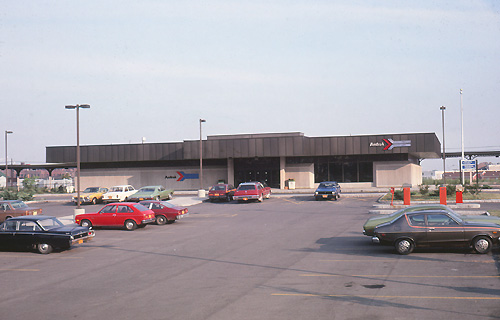
Station in 1978

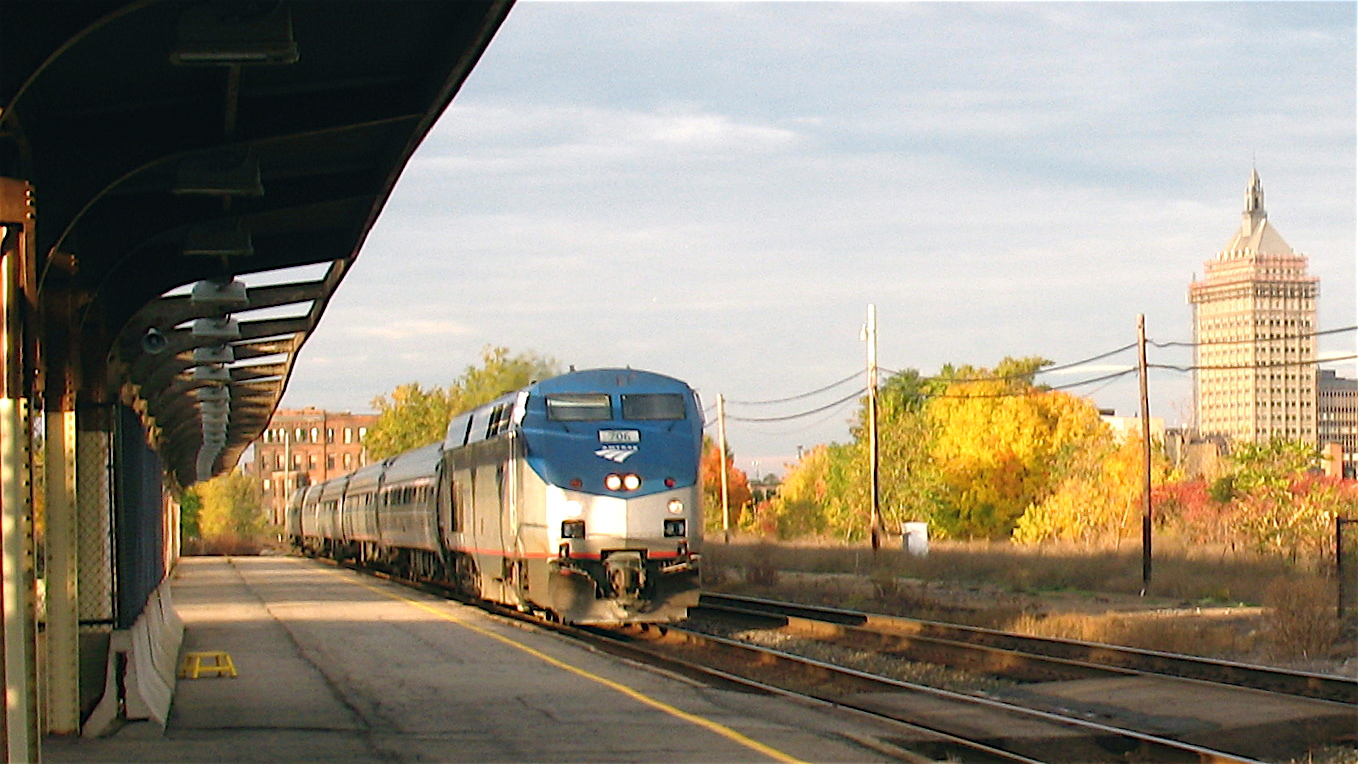
The 1978 "Amshack" style station in 2009. Note the low-level platform

In a move that is largely considered today to have been a mistake, the famed 1914 station was mostly demolished in 1965 after its sale to private owners except for the then run down western-most (one-third) portion which served as the station (with the ticket sales at the entrance to the passenger tunnel). That remaining section was demolished in 1977 to make way for a smaller Amtrak facility in 1978. The passenger, baggage tunnels and one of the platform canopies of the original 1914 building were the last remaining remnants of the previous 1914 station to survive. The tunnels were re-discovered during initial surveying work for the current station. During the construction of the station in 2015, the tunnels were filled in as part of the construction of a new tunnel for the station; the westernmost part of the canopy remains.

The 1978 structure was an Amshack style station similar to other stations Amtrak was building at the time as part of their Standard Stations Program. It opened on July 12, 1978. Its single track platform was shared by eastbound and westbound trains, which caused conflicts between passenger and freight trains and led to delays. In addition, its low-level platforms forced passengers to use steps when boarding and alighting. The 1978 station was intended to be temporary and was long outdated by the time it was demolished in late 2015 to make way for the current station.

Ground was broken for the current station and multimodal transit center on October 28, 2014. It opened on October 6, 2017, in a ceremony attended by Congresswoman Louise Slaughter, Mayor Lovely Warren and Governor Andrew Cuomo. The station's construction cost of $29.5 million (originally $26.5 million) was funded by the City of Rochester, State of New York, and Amtrak. Its construction occurred around the same time of two other Empire Corridor stations: Niagara Falls (2016) and Schenectady (2018).

On March 17, 2018, a day after Slaughter's death, Senators Chuck Schumer and Kirsten Gillibrand along with former Mayor and Lieutenant Governor Bob Duffy requested that Amtrak rename the station for Slaughter, who played a significant part in securing the funding for the rebuilt station. Four days later, Amtrak announced that it would rename the station, and officially unveiled the new name on March 25, 2019.

== Station layout ==
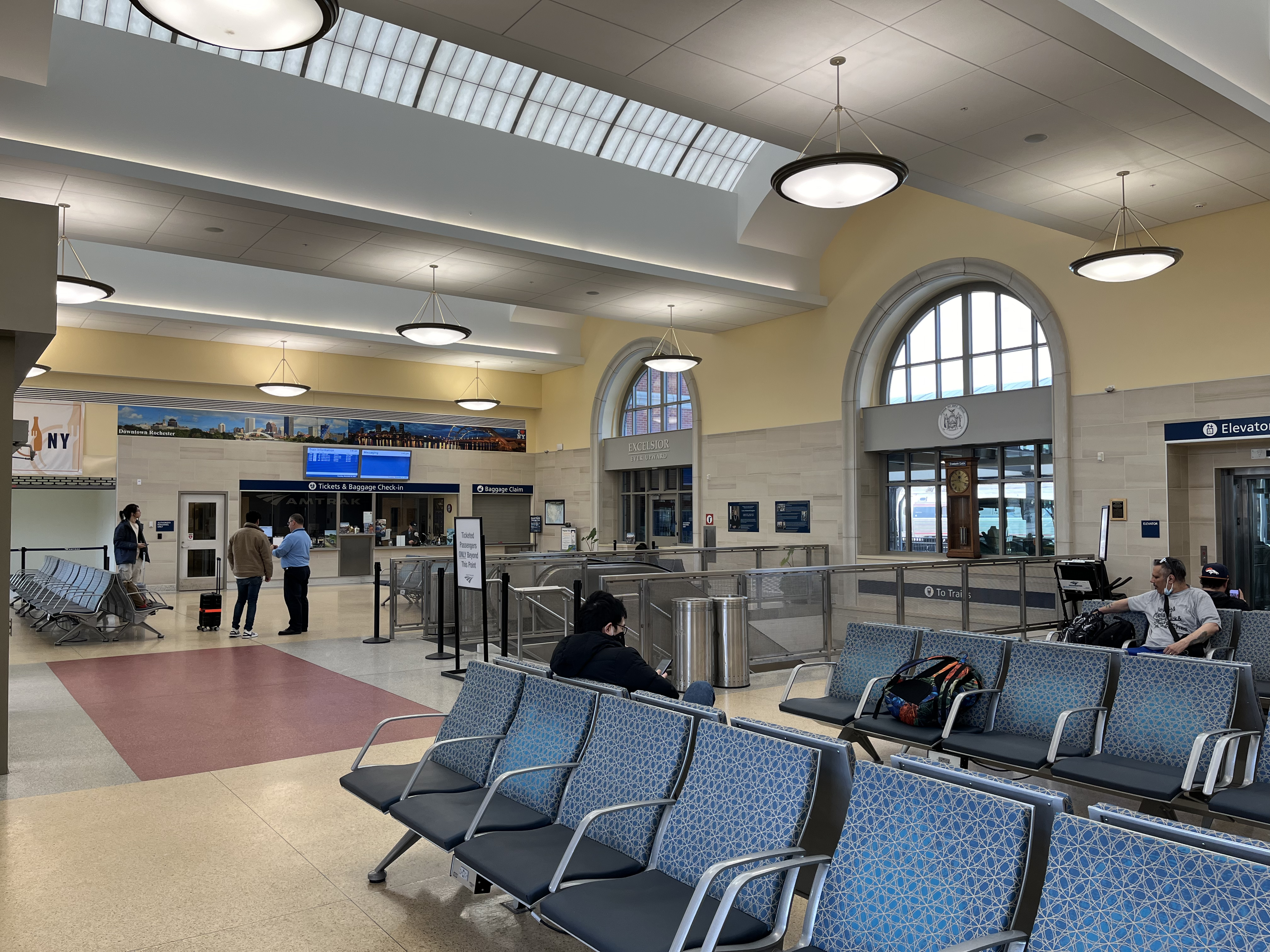
Station waiting room in 2023

The two floor station is 9,500 square feet (880 m^{2}). Designed to look like the original 1914 Bragdon station, it includes the 1914 station's original clock and plaques from both the 1914 station and 1882 station. Trains call at a single high-level center island platform serving one track in each direction for Amtrak, with two others on either side in each direction for freight traffic to pass by. The platform is connected to the station building via a tunnel underneath the tracks that is accessed by stairs, escalator and elevator. The station also contains two retail stands and many display boards.

To the side of the station is future parking allocation for Greyhound and Trailways buses, which currently stop at a temporary facility across the street as part of a phase 2 plan to directly incorporate buses into the station. It was also built to accommodate proposed high-speed rail service.

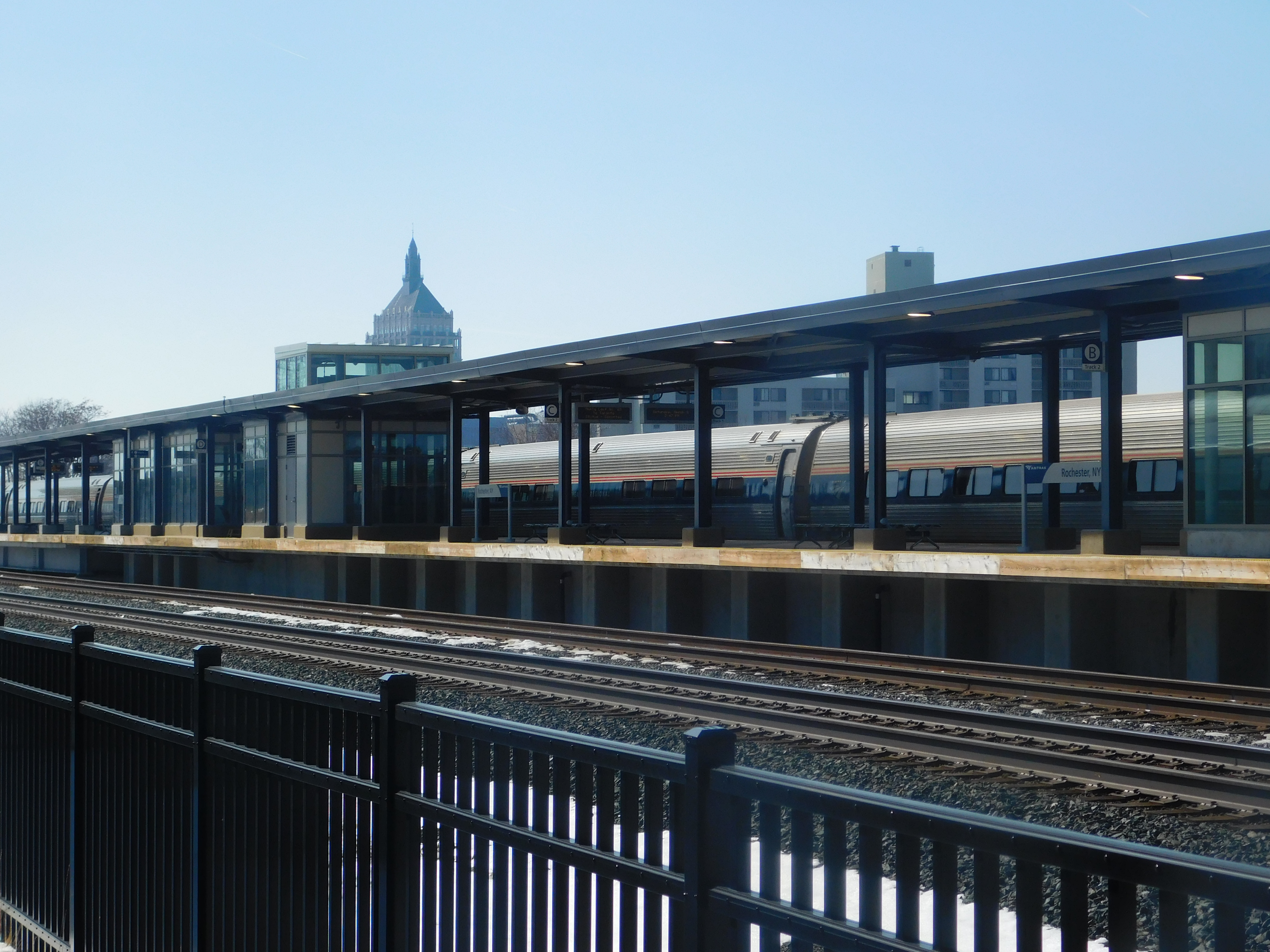
Rochester station platform

== Bus connections ==
The station is across the street from a temporary New York Trailways station. Phase 2 of the train station, which is awaiting funding, is to include a bus station for Trailways, Greyhound, FlixBus and Megabus.

RTS service includes the 2 North Clinton and the 3 Joseph, both of which go to the nearby RTS Transit Center, approximately .4 mile south on Clinton Avenue, where numerous additional bus connections are available.

== Immigration checkpoint ==
In 2010 U.S. Border Patrol agents boarded the trains at Rochester station and asked passengers for details of their citizenship. At that time passengers who were not able to suitably prove their right to be in the U.S. could have been removed from the train and taken into custody.
