= William F. Walsh Regional Transportation Center =

Rail and bus station in the United States

Syracuse, NY
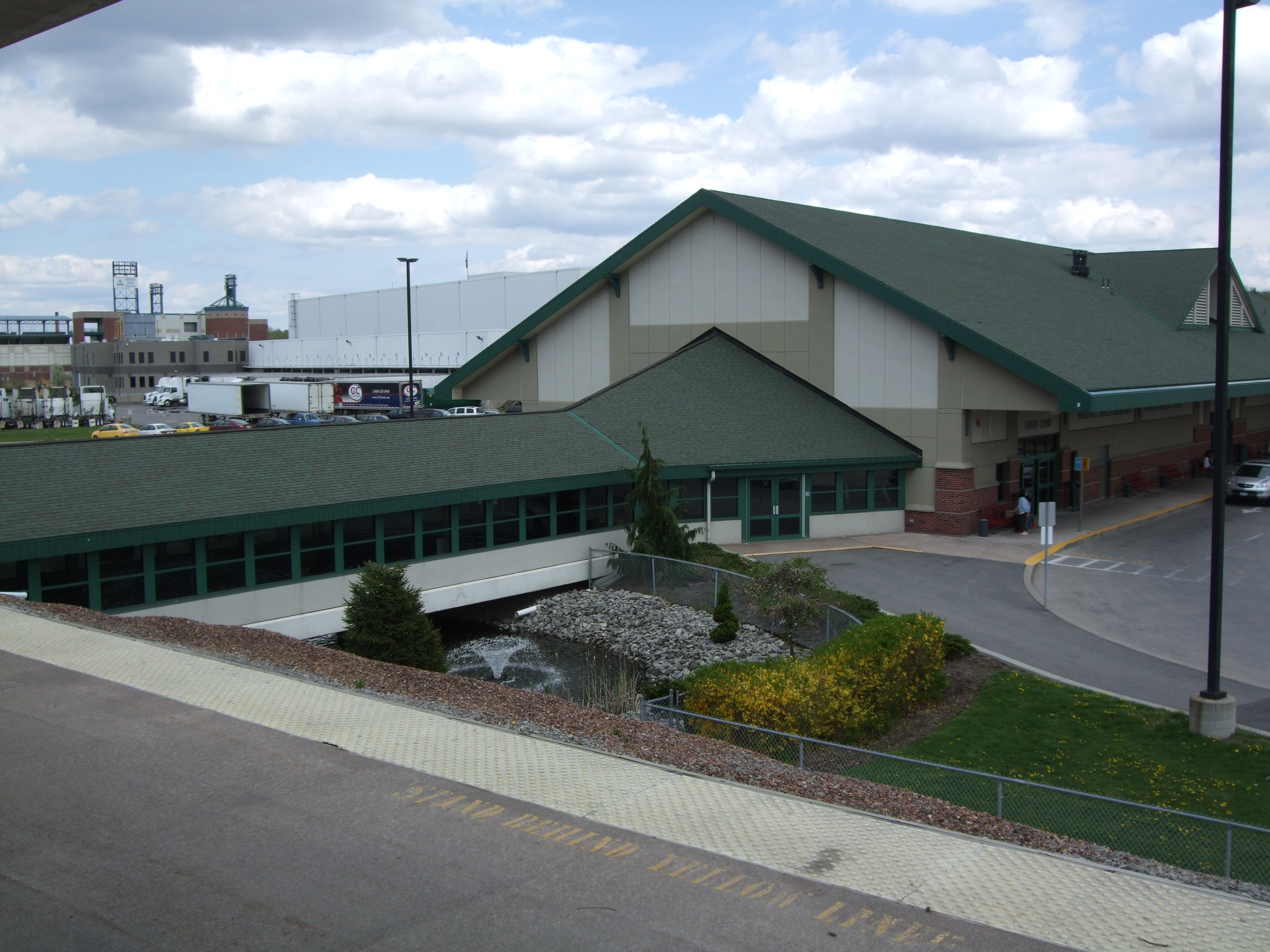
- Walsh Regional Transportation Center in May 2009

General information
- Location: 1 Walsh Circle; Syracuse, New York; United States
- Coordinates: 43°04′36″N 76°10′09″W
- Owner: Intermodal Transportation Center, Inc.
- Line: Empire Corridor (Syracuse Terminal Subdivision)
- Platforms: 1 side platform
- Tracks: 3
- Bus operators: Greyhound Lines; Megabus; Trailways
- Connections: Centro: 16, 40, 46, 50, 246

Construction
- Parking: Yes
- Cycle facilities: Yes
- Accessible: Yes

Other information
- Station code: Amtrak: SYR; Via Rail: SYRA
- IATA code: ZXS
- Website: Official website

History
- Opened: 1998

Passengers
- FY 2025: 161,900 (Amtrak)

Services
Preceding station	Amtrak	Following station
Rochester toward Niagara Falls, New York	Empire Service	Rome toward New York
Rochester toward Toronto	Maple Leaf	Rome toward New York
Rochester toward Chicago	Lake Shore Limited	Utica toward New York or Boston South
New York State Fair services
Preceding station	Amtrak	Following station
New York State Fair toward Niagara Falls, New York	Empire Service	Rome toward New York
New York State Fair toward Toronto	Maple Leaf	Rome toward New York
Former services
Preceding station	Amtrak	Following station
Rochester toward Chicago	Lake Shore	Utica toward New York (Grand Central)
Rochester toward Detroit (Michigan Central)	Niagara Rainbow	Rome toward New York (Grand Central)
Location

The William F. Walsh Regional Transportation Center (RTC) is an Amtrak intermodal transit station serving the Syracuse area. It is owned and operated by Intermodal Transportation Center, Inc, a subsidiary of Centro, and is also served by Greyhound Lines, Megabus, and Trailways. Local and regional bus transportation is provided by Centro. Various taxi firms provide service to the Center, as well.

The Regional Transportation Center is located at 1 Walsh Circle, near the Central New York Regional Market, NBT Bank Stadium and Destiny USA. The station is named for William F. Walsh, a former mayor of Syracuse and representative in the U.S. Congress.

Syracuse is served by the daily round trip of the Lake Shore Limited, two daily Empire Service round trips, and the daily Maple Leaf round trip.

== History ==
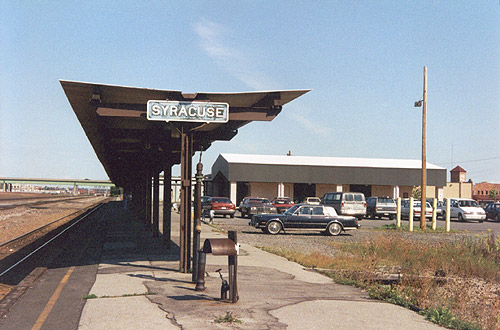
Former Syracuse station from platform, November 1994

When the financially desperate New York Central Railroad sold off its elevated right-of-way through downtown Syracuse to the State of New York in 1962, all rail service was re-routed onto a former freight bypass to the north of the city center. The elevated line and train station had been in service for less than 30 years, having replaced tracks that ran at-grade through the center of Washington Street.

With the former train route converted into Interstate 690, rail passengers were forced to use a "temporary" structure near the freight yards in East Syracuse, opened on August 29, 1962. The East Syracuse station remained in use well into the Amtrak era, long after the end of its useful life. Bus service remained at the former train station until a 1996 fire. Both options proved decidedly unpopular, with the train station in particular becoming synonymous with Amtrak's many woes.

Opened in 1998, the Regional Transportation Center replaced both venues, re-integrating bus and rail service for the first time since the early 1960s. There were provisions built for OnTrack, Syracuse's commuter train line built on the former Lackawanna right-of-way through Armory Square, to call at the station. However, a bridge that was intended to connect the two lines was never built after CSX claimed construction could destabilize its freight rail bridge, and the OnTrack program was axed due to low ridership.

== Station layout ==
The station is built at ground level, with bus loading/unloading areas in front of the main entrance, and stairs and an elevator leading up to the tracks, which are on an embankment. A central concourse with a Subway restaurant and a waiting room links the two areas. Trains call at a single high-level island platform serving one (nominally eastbound) track; provisions were made for cross-platform transfers with OnTrack on the other side, but the program was canceled before service ever reached the station.

== Bus service ==
Centro bus routes serve the Regional Transportation Center from Fulton, Liverpool, Oswego, Phoenix and Syracuse. The station is served by routes 16, 40, 46, 50, and 246.

It is also served by intercity bus service:

- Greyhound:
  - Syracuse – New York-Port Authority via Cortland, Binghamton, and Scranton
  - Syracuse – Cleveland via Rochester, Batavia, Buffalo, and Erie
  - Syracuse – Boston via Utica, Schenectady, Albany, Springfield, Worcester
- Megabus:
  - Syracuse – New York-33rd Street
  - Syracuse – Rochester
- Trailways of New York
  - Syracuse – New York-Port Authority via Cortland, Binghamton, and Scranton
  - Syracuse – Buffalo via Rochester
