= Maple Leaf (train) =

International passenger train operated by Amtrak and Via Rail

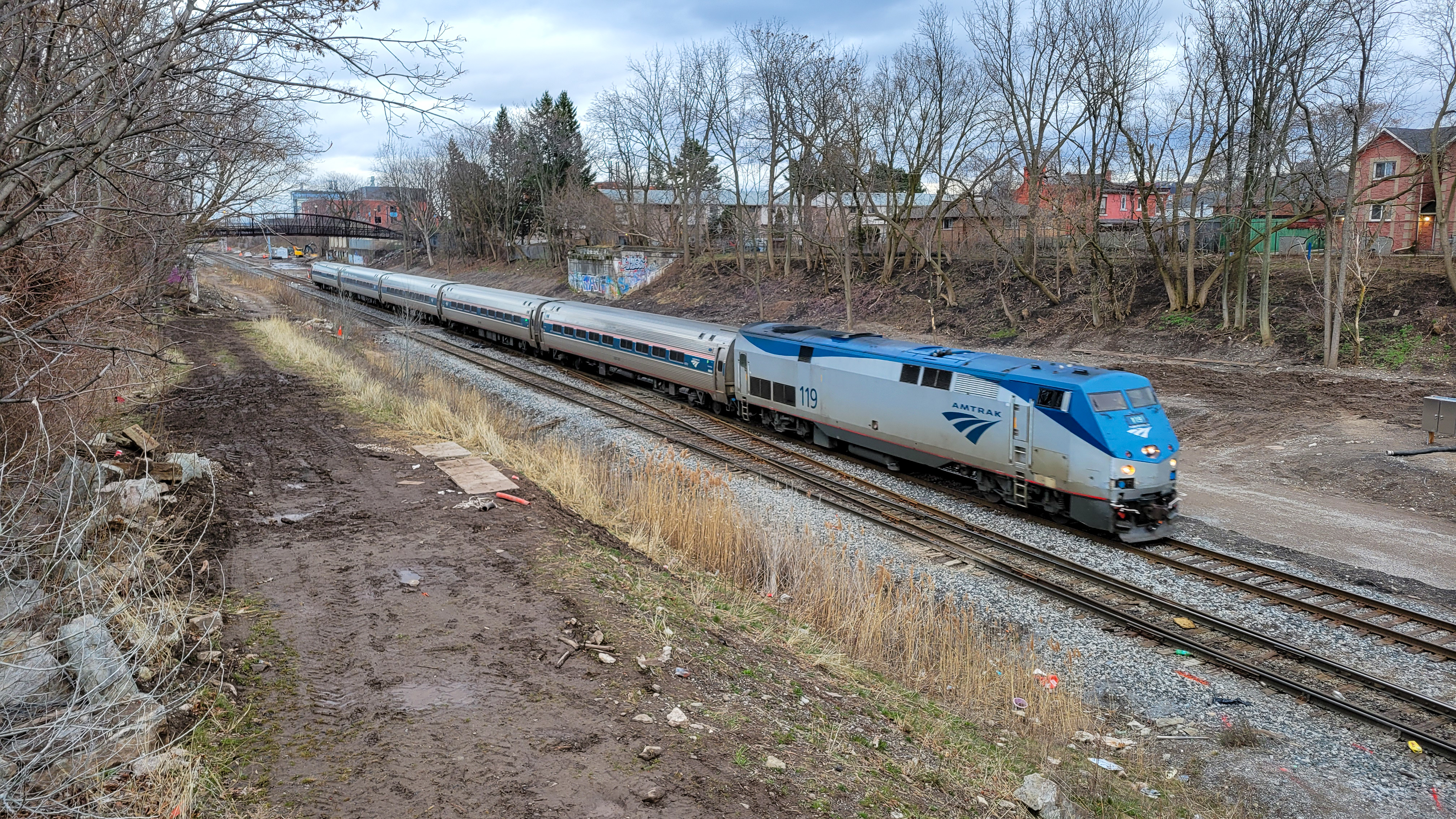
- The Maple Leaf passing through Hamilton, Ontario, in 2024

Overview
- Service type: Inter-city rail
- Locale: New York State/Golden Horseshoe region, Ontario
- Predecessor: The Ontarian
- First service: April 26, 1981
- Current operators: Amtrak (within US); Via Rail (within Canada)

Route
- Termini: Toronto, Ontario; New York City, New York
- Distance travelled: 544 miles (875 km)
- Average journey time: 12 1/2 hours (Note: Includes time at border control.)
- Service frequency: Daily
- Train numbers: 63, 64 (Amtrak); 97, 98 (Via)

On-board services
- Classes: Coach Class; Business Class
- Disabled access: All cars, all stations
- Catering facilities: Café car
- Baggage facilities: Overhead racks

Technical
- Rolling stock: Amfleet coaches
- Track gauge: 4 ft 8 1/2 in (1,435 mm) standard gauge
- Operating speed: 44 mph (71 km/h) (avg.); 110 mph (180 km/h) (top)
- Track owners: Amtrak, MNRR, CSX, CN, Metrolinx

The Maple Leaf is an international passenger train service operated by Amtrak and Via Rail between New York Penn Station in New York City and Union Station in Toronto via Amtrak's Empire Corridor, and the south western part of Via Rail's Quebec City–Windsor Corridor. Daily service is offered in both directions; the 544-mile (875 km) trip takes approximately 12 hours, including two hours for U.S. or Canadian customs and immigration inspection at either Niagara Falls, New York, or Niagara Falls, Ontario. Although the train uses Amtrak rolling stock exclusively, the train is operated by Via Rail crews while in Canada and by Amtrak crews in the United States. Service began in 1981.

== History ==
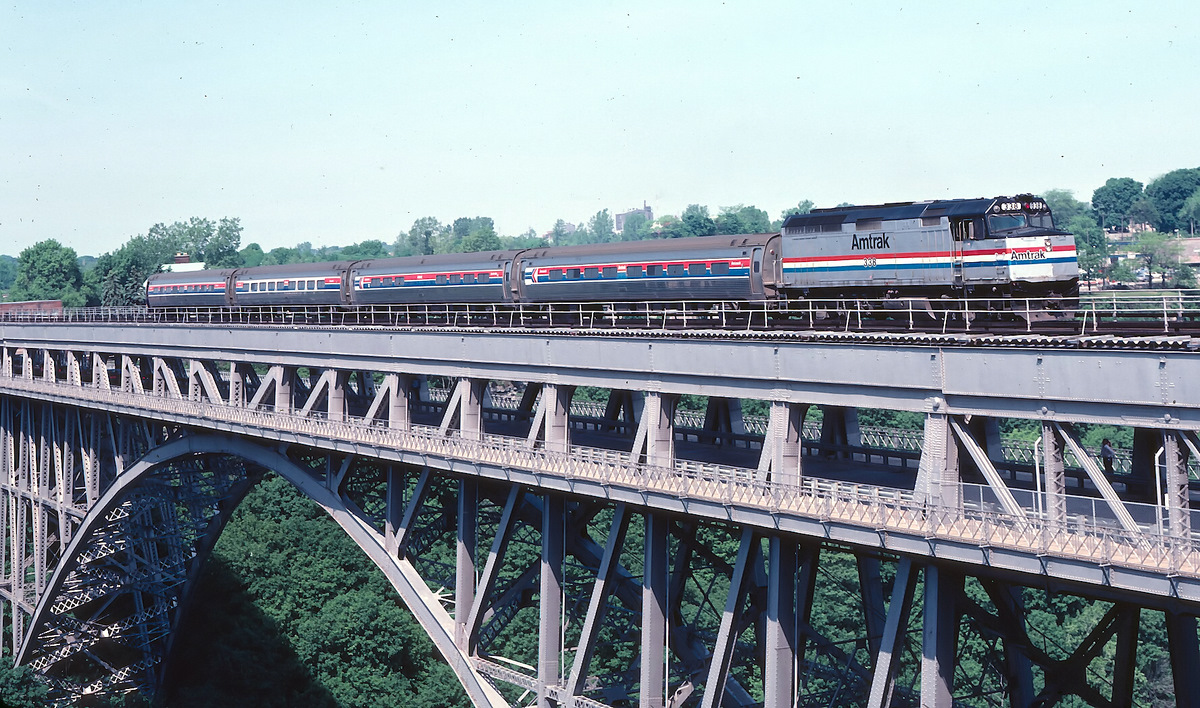
The Maple Leaf crosses the Whirlpool Rapids Bridge, in 1983.

Amtrak and Via Rail introduced the Maple Leaf along the Hudson River and Erie Canal on April 26, 1981. The Maple Leaf replaced Buffalo–Toronto connecting service operated by Via and the Toronto, Hamilton and Buffalo Railway, the latter of which discontinued passenger service that day. The new Maple Leaf was the first collaboration between the two companies and the first direct New York–Toronto passenger service in a decade, the last being an overnight TH&B, New York Central, and Canadian Pacific Railway train called The Ontarian (Buffalo–Toronto) that ended in 1967. That earlier train began as the Cleveland Limited westbound, with sleeper passengers having a continuous carriage ride (eastbound riders joined the Ohio State Limited for the Buffalo-New York City leg). By contrast, the modern Maple Leaf was a unified New York City–Toronto train. There was also a New York City–Toronto train named Maple Leaf operated by the Lehigh Valley Railroad from 1937 until 1961, a train that traveled through northern New Jersey, northeast Pennsylvania, and central New York.

The new train employed Amtrak's Amfleet coaches with a dinette car. A 1982 consist included a baggage car, two coaches and a dinette; time spent in customs ranged from thirty minutes to two hours. The new route goes through the two Niagara Falls towns on both sides of the border, before going to Aldershot in Burlington, then Toronto. The prior New York Central trains crossed from Buffalo to Ontario south of the Niagara Falls and made five stops in Ontario before reaching Toronto.

An Amtrak crew operates the train in the United States, while a Via Rail crew operates the train in Canada. The crew change takes place in Niagara Falls, Ontario. Because of this need for a crew exchange, the Maple Leaf was led by some of the last EMD F40PH locomotives in Amtrak revenue service. While most Amtrak routes outside the Northeast Corridor had switched to the GE Genesis by 2000, it had not been added to the Maple Leaf, owing to the Via Rail crews' unfamiliarity with the unit. The Maple Leaf retained the F40PH until Via received its own Genesis locomotives in 2002.

The Maple Leaf is one of four New York Amtrak routes that are primarily state-funded, with the others being the Adirondack, Empire Service, and Ethan Allen Express. Primary funding for these routes is from the New York State Department of Transportation rather than federal funding.

In 2013, the Maple Leaf was the target of a failed terror plot involving an attempt by two men, both permanent residents of Canada, who sought to derail the train as it crossed a bridge over the Twenty Mile Creek near Jordan, Ontario. The two men were allegedly affiliates of an Al-Qaeda group operating out of Iran.

In March 2020, the Maple Leaf was truncated to Niagara Falls, New York after all non-essential travel across the Canada–United States border was banned in response to the ongoing COVID-19 pandemic. Via did not provide alternate service on the Canadian side of the border. International service resumed on June 27, 2022. The Adirondack and Maple Leaf were combined between New York and Albany–Rensselaer beginning November 10, 2024, due to construction work in the East River Tunnels limiting capacity at Penn Station. This was reversed effective December 2, 2024, through at least March 2025.

== Operation ==
=== Equipment ===
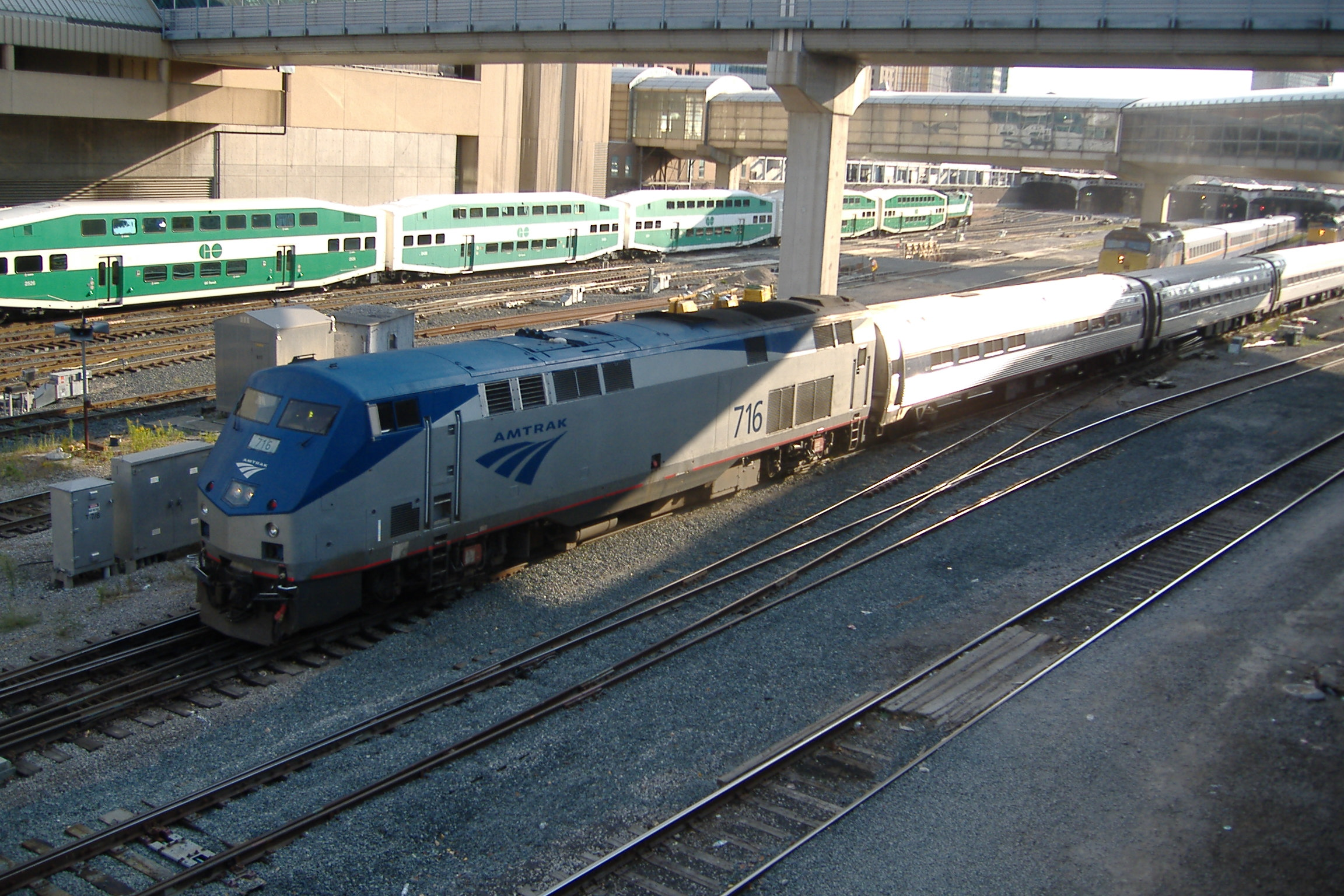
Amtrak locomotive #716 pulling its train out of Toronto's Union Station.

Most Maple Leaf trains consist of five or six cars hauled by a locomotive.

The passenger cars are the Amfleet I series built by the Budd Company in the mid-1970s to early-1980s. Most trains include an Amfleet club car, which has a combination of Business Class seating with a Café (food service/lounge) and four or five Coach Class cars.

Between New York City and Albany–Rensselaer, trains are pulled by a GE Genesis P32AC-DM dual-mode diesel locomotive at speeds up to 110 mph (177 km/h). The locomotives operate on third rail electric power in Penn Station and the Empire Connection tunnel and on diesel power for the rest of the route. Between Albany–Rensselaer and Toronto, diesel-only GE Genesis P42DC locomotives are used; however, the P32AC-DM locomotive may occasionally stay on the train all the way to Toronto.

In the coming years all equipment will be replaced with Amtrak Airo trainsets, the railroad's branding of its combination of Siemens Venture passenger cars and a Siemens Charger diesel-electric locomotive. The trainsets for the Maple Leaf will have six passenger cars, which will include a cab control car food service area and a mix of 2×2 Coach Class and 2×1 Business Class seating. The car closest to the locomotive will have batteries to supply electricity to traction motors in the locomotive when operating in Penn Station and the Empire Connection tunnel, eliminating the need for third rail propulsion. The arrangement will eliminate the time-consuming locomotive change at Albany–Rensselaer.

=== Classes of service ===
All classes of service include complimentary WiFi, an electric outlet (120 V, 60 Hz AC) at each seat, reading lamps, fold-out tray tables. Reservations are required on all trains, tickets may be purchased online, from an agent at some stations, a ticketing machine at most stations, or, at a higher cost, from the conductor on the train.

- Coach Class: 2×2 seating. Passengers self-select seats on a first-come, first-served basis.
- Business Class: 2×1 seating with more legroom than coach. Passengers receive complimentary soft drinks.

=== Route ===
Maple Leaf route map

In the United States, the Maple Leaf shares the route of the Empire Service, Amtrak's corridor service along the former main line of the New York Central Railroad. From New York City to Albany, it runs mostly parallel to the Hudson River (viewable on the left side northbound and the right side southbound). In Canada, the service shares the route of GO Transit's Lakeshore West commuter rail line.

Prior to the completion of the Empire Connection in 1991, the Maple Leaf originated at Grand Central Terminal in New York instead of Penn Station.

The Maple Leaf operates over Metrolinx and Canadian National Railway trackage in Canada, and CSX Transportation, Metro-North Railroad, and Amtrak trackage in the United States.

- Metrolinx Oakville Subdivision, Toronto to Burlington
- CN Oakville Subdivision and Grimsby Subdivision, Burlington to Niagara Falls
- CSX Niagara Subdivision, Buffalo Terminal Subdivision, Rochester Subdivision, Mohawk Subdivision, Selkirk Subdivision, and Hudson Subdivision, Niagara Falls to Schenectady (Amtrak leases the Hudson Subdivision between Schenectady and Poughkeepsie from CSX)
- MNRR Hudson Line, Poughkeepsie to Spuyten Duyvil
- Amtrak Empire Connection, Spuyten Duyvil to Penn Station.
- Amtrak Niagara connection, Niagara Falls, NY to CN Niagara Falls Yard (Grimsby Subdivision), Niagara Falls, ON

Amtrak numbers the train as 63 northbound and 64 southbound, while Via numbers it as 97 southbound and 98 northbound. Via bills the Canadian leg of the route as part of its Corridor services.

Northbound trains leave New York during the morning rush, arriving in Syracuse at noon, crossing into Canada during the afternoon rush and arriving in Toronto in early evening. Southbound trains leave Toronto during the morning rush, cross into the United States just after noon and arrive in New York in mid-evening. Trains stop for two hours for customs procedures in Niagara Falls, Ontario northbound and Niagara Falls, New York southbound.

== Stations ==
| State/ Province | Town/City | Mile (km) | Station | Connections |
|---|---|---|---|---|
| Ontario | Toronto | 544 (875) | Union Station | Via Rail: ■ The Canadian, ■ Québec City–Windsor Corridor; GO Transit Rail: Barrie, Kitchener, Milton, Lakeshore East, Lakeshore West, Richmond Hill, Stouffville; Union Pearson Express; TTC Rail:, 509 , 510; Local bus: GO Transit, TTC Bus |
| Ontario | Oakville | 523 (842) | Oakville | Via Rail: ■ Québec City–Windsor Corridor; GO Transit Rail: Lakeshore West; Local bus: GO Transit, Oakville Transit |
| Ontario | Burlington | 512 (824) | Aldershot | Via Rail: ■ Québec City–Windsor Corridor; GO Transit Rail: Lakeshore West; Local bus: GO Transit, Burlington Transit, Hamilton Street Railway |
| Ontario | Grimsby | 488 (785) | Grimsby | |
| Ontario | St. Catharines | 473 (761) | St. Catharines | GO Transit Rail: Lakeshore West; Niagara Region Transit |
| Ontario | Niagara Falls | 462 (744) | Niagara Falls, Ontario | GO Transit Rail: Lakeshore West; Local bus: GO Transit, Niagara Region Transit, WEGO |
Canada–United States border
| New York | Niagara Falls | 461 (742) | Niagara Falls, New York | Amtrak: Empire Service |
| New York | Buffalo | 437 (703) | Buffalo–Exchange Street | Amtrak: Empire Service, Thruway to Jamestown, NY; NFTA: Metro Rail |
| New York | Depew | 431 (694) | Buffalo–Depew | Amtrak: Empire Service, Lake Shore Limited |
| New York | Rochester | 370 (600) | Rochester | Amtrak: Empire Service, Lake Shore Limited |
| New York | Syracuse | | New York State Fair | Train only stops during the New York State Fair |
| New York | Syracuse | 291 (468) | Syracuse | Amtrak: Empire Service, Lake Shore Limited; CENTRO |
| New York | Rome | 250 (400) | Rome | Amtrak: Empire Service |
| New York | Utica | 237 (381) | Utica | Amtrak: Empire Service, Lake Shore Limited; Adirondack Railroad to Thendara, New York; CENTRO |
| New York | Amsterdam | 177 (285) | Amsterdam | Amtrak: Empire Service |
| New York | Schenectady | 159 (256) | Schenectady | Amtrak: Adirondack, Empire Service, Ethan Allen Express, Lake Shore Limited; Capital District Transportation Authority |
| New York | Rensselaer | 141 (227) | Albany–Rensselaer | Amtrak: Adirondack, Berkshire Flyer, Empire Service, Ethan Allen Express, Lake Shore Limited; Capital District Transportation Authority |
| New York | Hudson | 114 (183) | Hudson | Amtrak: Adirondack, Berkshire Flyer, Empire Service, Ethan Allen Express |
| New York | Rhinecliff | 88 (142) | Rhinecliff | Amtrak: Adirondack, Berkshire Flyer, Empire Service, Ethan Allen Express |
| New York | Poughkeepsie | 73 (117) | Poughkeepsie | Amtrak: Adirondack, Berkshire Flyer, Empire Service, Ethan Allen Express; Metro-North Railroad: ■ Hudson Line; Dutchess County Public Transit, Ulster County Area Transit |
| New York | Croton-on-Hudson | 32 (51) | Croton–Harmon | Amtrak: Adirondack, Berkshire Flyer, Empire Service, Ethan Allen Express, Lake Shore Limited; Metro-North Railroad: ■ Hudson Line; Bee-Line Bus System |
| New York | Yonkers | 14 (23) | Yonkers | Amtrak: Adirondack, Berkshire Flyer, Empire Service, Ethan Allen Express; Metro-North Railroad: ■ Hudson Line; Bee-Line Bus System |
| New York | New York City | 0 | Penn Station | Amtrak (long-distance): Cardinal, Crescent, Lake Shore Limited, Palmetto, Silver Meteor; Amtrak (intercity): Acela, Adirondack, Berkshire Flyer, Carolinian, Empire Service, Ethan Allen Express, Keystone Service, Northeast Regional, Pennsylvanian, Vermonter; Long Island Rail Road: ■ City Terminal Zone, ■ Port Washington Branch; NJ Transit: ■ North Jersey Coast Line, ■ Northeast Corridor Line, ■ Gladstone Branch, ■ Montclair–Boonton Line, ■ Morristown Line; NYC Subway: PATH: HOB-33 JSQ-33 JSQ-33 (via HOB); NYC Transit Bus |

== See also ==
- Cascades
- Montrealer
