= Ontarian (train) =

Former passenger train in the United States

Overview
- Service type: Inter-city rail
- Status: Discontinued
- First service: April, 1938
- Last service: December 2, 1967
- Former operators: New York Central Railroad, Canadian Pacific Railway, Toronto, Hamilton and Buffalo Railway

Route
- Termini: New York City; Toronto
- Service frequency: Daily
- Train number: 371/376

On-board services
- Seating arrangements: coaches
- Sleeping arrangements: roomettes, double bedrooms

The Ontarian was an overnight Pullman passenger train connecting New York City with Toronto via the New York Central’s Water Level Route and the Toronto, Hamilton and Buffalo line. Discontinued as a through service in 1967, Amtrak eventually began service on the same route as the Maple Leaf day train and even experimented with a weekend overnight service in the 1990’s.

== History ==
The train began service in April 1938, replacing the Toronto-New Yorker train. The train carried a lounge car between Toronto and Syracuse which it swapped for a diner between Syracuse and New York City. It carried a coach between Toronto and Buffalo, requiring all other passengers to purchase sleeper berths east of Buffalo. The Ontarian was discontinued when the New York Central dropped most of their overnight trains for day trains as indicated on period timetables.
