= New York State Fair station =

Train station in Syracuse, New York, U.S.

New York State Fair
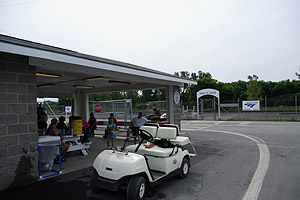
- Shelter and waiting area in August 2011

General information
- Location: 581 State Fair Boulevard, Gate 11; Syracuse, New York; United States
- Coordinates: 43°4′18.2″N 76°13′46.3″W
- Line: Water Level Route
- Platforms: 1 island platform
- Tracks: 4

Construction
- Accessible: Yes

Other information
- Station code: Amtrak: NYF

History
- Opened: August 22, 2002

Services
Preceding station	Amtrak	Following station
Rochester toward Niagara Falls, New York	Empire Service	Syracuse toward New York
Rochester toward Toronto	Maple Leaf	Syracuse toward New York
Lake Shore Limited does not stop here
Location

New York State Fair station serves the New York State Fairground in Syracuse, New York. It is served by Amtrak Empire Service and Maple Leaf trains while the fair is in operation. The station is located in the southwest corner of the fairgrounds, with a shuttle service to the central area. It consists of an unsheltered low island platform between two of the four tracks of the former New York Central Railroad Water Level Route four-track mainline, with a sheltered waiting area nearby. A mobile lift provides handicapped access.

== History ==
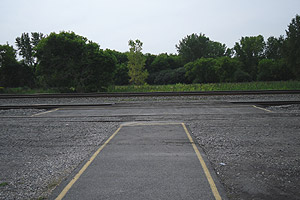
The 2002-constructed platform in 2011

New York Central trains stopped at the fair beginning in the 19th century, but service was eventually discontinued. In 2001, the Empire State Passengers Association brokered talks between Amtrak and the New York State Fair Director about adding the Fair as an Amtrak stop, with positive response from both parties. After an agreement was reached with CSX, the Fair constructed a platform and cinderblock shelter, and Amtrak stopped at the 2002 fair. Approximately 1000 riders — most from Rochester — used the stop in 2002, taking advantage of half-price admission to the fair when arriving by train.

Ridership has remained constant at around 1,000 passengers using the stop at each fair. Most are from Rochester and Buffalo, as Amtrak schedules do not allow riders from the east to spend a full day at the fair, and CENTRO runs buses from Syracuse with higher frequency and lower fares. In 2014, Governor Andrew Cuomo intervened when scheduling conflicts with CSX threatened service to the fair.
