= Rome station (New York) =

Amtrak rail station in Rome, New York, United States

Rome, NY
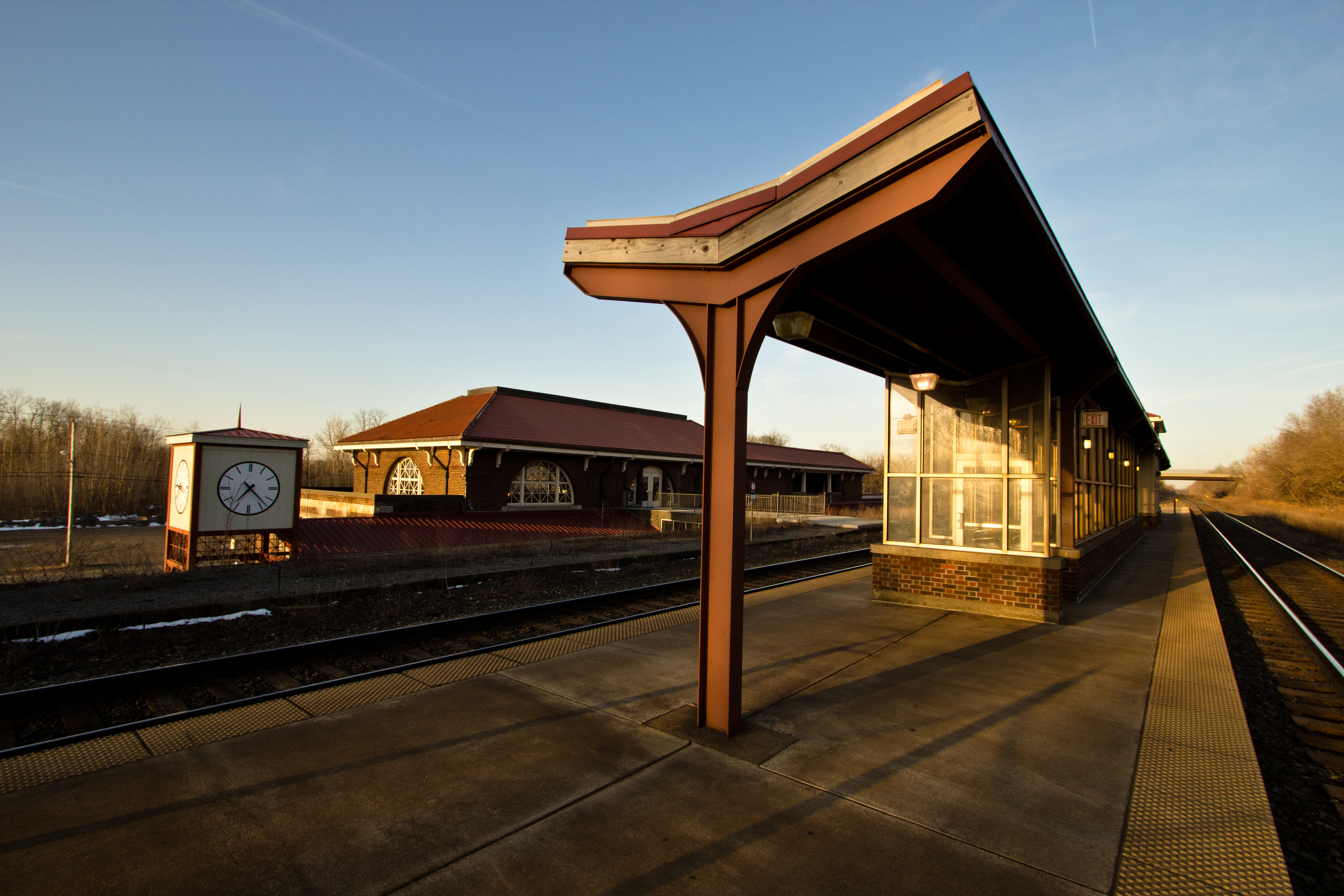
- Station building viewed from the platform

General information
- Location: 6599 Martin Street; Rome, New York; United States
- Coordinates: 43°11′58″N 75°27′00″W
- Owner: City of Rome
- Line: Empire Corridor (Mohawk Subdivision)
- Platforms: 1 island platform
- Tracks: 2
- Connections: CENTRO of Oneida: 4, 7

Construction
- Parking: Several free spaces
- Accessible: Yes

Other information
- Station code: Amtrak: ROM; Via Rail: ROME

History
- Opened: 1914

Passengers
- FY 2025: 12,486 (Amtrak)

Services
Preceding station	Amtrak	Following station
Syracuse toward Niagara Falls, New York	Empire Service	Utica toward New York
Syracuse toward Toronto	Maple Leaf	Utica toward New York
Lake Shore Limited does not stop here
Former services
Preceding station	Amtrak	Following station
Syracuse toward Detroit (Michigan Central)	Niagara Rainbow	Utica toward New York (Grand Central)
Preceding station	New York Central Railroad	Following station
Greenway toward Chicago	Main Line	Oriskany toward New York
Humaston toward Oswego	Oswego – Rome	Terminus
Greenway toward Buffalo–Exchange Street	River Division	Oriskany toward Weehawken
Location

Rome station is a Neoclassical train station served by Amtrak. It is located on 6599 Martin Street in Rome, New York between the NY 26-49-69 bridge and Mill Road south of the Erie Canal.

Four Empire Service trains (two westbound to Niagara Falls and two eastbound to Penn Station in New York City) stop at Rome, as do a pair of Maple Leaf trains (one eastbound, one westbound) between Penn Station and Toronto Union Station for a total of six daily departures. CENTRO of Oneida's Rome bus routes 4 and 7 also stop at the station.

== History ==
The current station was built between 1912 and 1914 by the New York Central Railroad south of the city proper to replace the former structure downtown. Such a move was necessitated by a track realignment.

The one-and-a-half-story brick building was constructed in a Neoclassical style and includes columns flanking the vestibules, decorative grillwork and large arched windows. The waiting room includes a bowed ticket window and a series of delicate triple-globed bronze chandeliers. At the rear of the waiting room are paired symmetrical staircases with ornate openwork iron railings up to the near platform.

In 1988, Amtrak conveyed the station to the city of Rome. Amtrak proposed to close the station in 1996, but the city resisted and instead found federal funds to renovate the station. The $4 million reconstruction was finished in 2004.

== Station layout ==
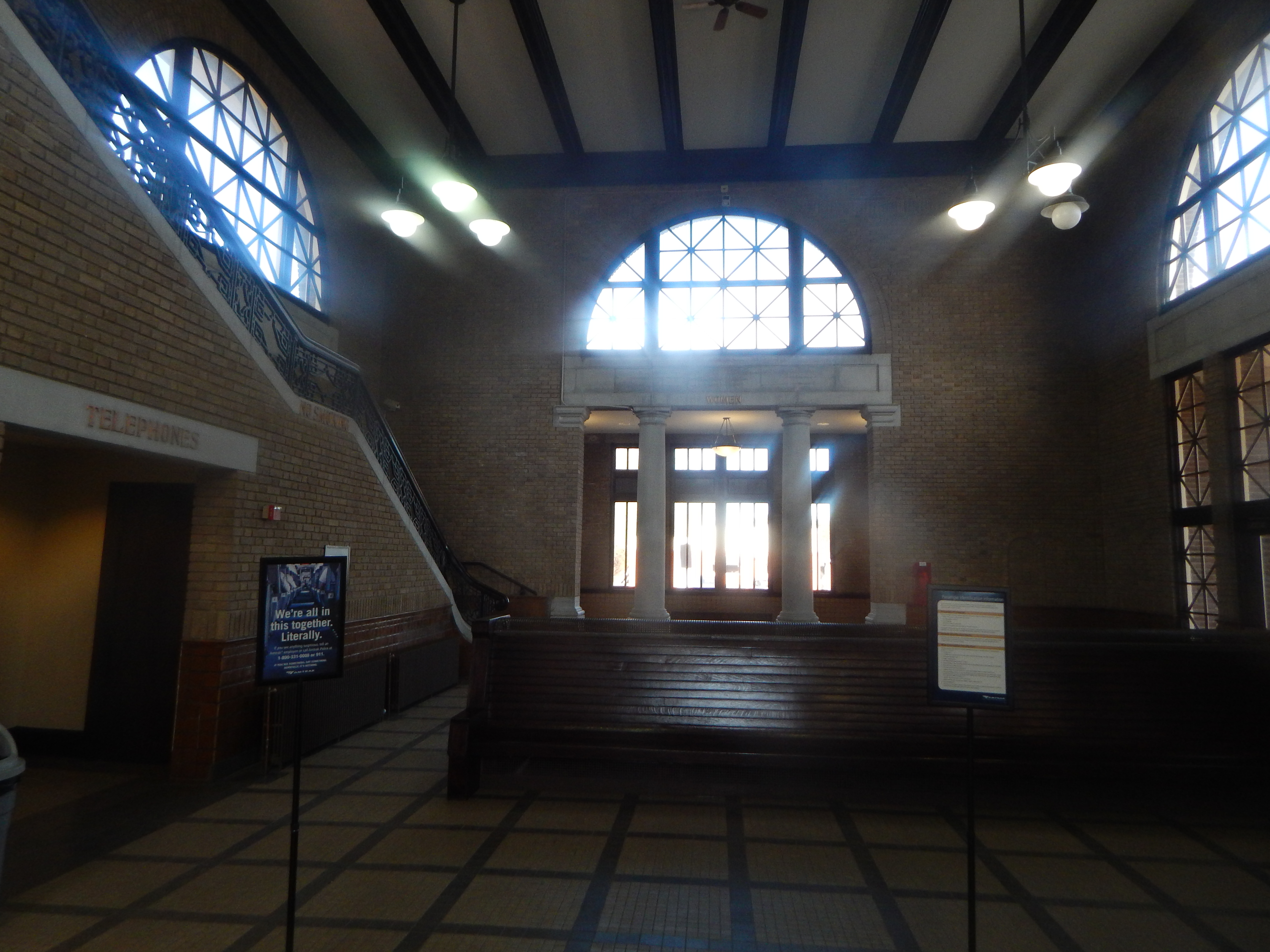
Interior of Rome station, May 2015

The station has an unusual configuration because the building is located at grade while the tracks are on a raised embankment. The low-level island platform is accessed by an under-track passage; both were constructed in 2002. A side platform, now abandoned, is accessed directly from the building's second story. The platform includes enclosed passenger shelters and is heated to make snow removal unnecessary.
