= Hoffmans, New York =

- Hamlet
- Location within New York Location within the United States
- Coordinates: 42°53′42″N 74°04′35″W
- Country: United States
- State: New York
- County: Schenectady
- Town: Glenville
- Elevation: 266 ft (81 m)
- Time zone: UTC-5 (Eastern (EST))
  - Summer (DST): UTC-4 (EDT)
- Area code: 518

Hoffmans is a hamlet located northwest of Rotterdam Junction in the town of Glenville in Schenectady County, New York, United States. NY-5 runs east-west through the hamlet. Hoffmans is located on the north bank of the Mohawk River.
