= Thendara station =

Train station in New York state

Thendara
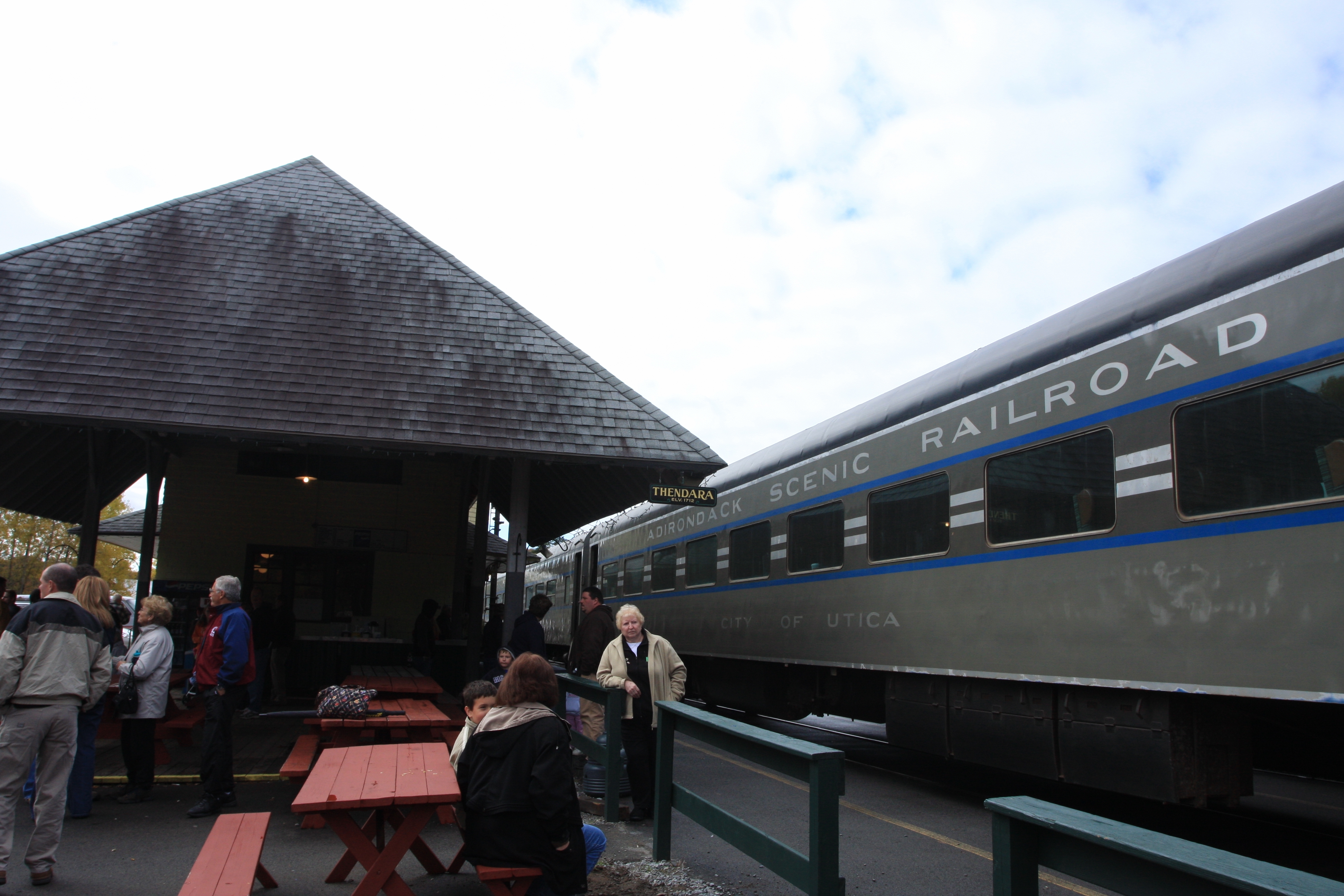

General information
- Location: Birch Street near NY 28; Thendara, New York
- Coordinates: 43°41′54″N 75°00′21″W
- System: Adirondack Scenic Railroad station
- Owner: New York State
- Platforms: 1 side platform
- Tracks: 2

Construction
- Structure type: at-grade
- Parking: 2 paved lots and gravel lot
- Accessible: 1

History
- Former names: Fulton Chain Station

Services
Preceding station	Adirondack Railroad	Following station
Otter Lake toward Utica	Main Line	Carter Station toward Tupper Lake
Former services
Preceding station	New York Central Railroad	Following station
Otter Lake toward Utica	Adirondack Division	Carter Station toward Montreal

U.S. Historic district – Contributing property
- Official name: Thendara Depot
- Designated: November 10, 2010
- Part of: Thendara Historic District
- Reference no.: 10000897
- Architectural style: None Specified
Location

Thendara station is the Adirondack Scenic Railroad's longest-duration northern terminus, and is near Thendara, New York. It is served by trains heading south to Utica beginning around the month of May each year. Trains continue along the 57-mile route along the Moose River in Adirondack Park. In the Winter, the right-of-way is used as a major snowmobile trail in the area after trains stop running in October. The resort village of Old Forge is 1.9 miles northeast of Thendara.

The station has been a contributing property of the "Thendara Historic District" since November 10, 2010.

== History ==
From early in the 20th century until the early 1940s, the New York Central Railroad (NYC) operated multiple passenger trains a day through the station, going beyond Adirondack Park to Malone, New York and on to Montreal. From the 1950s and to 1961 daily there was a day train and a night train in each direction to Lake Placid station. Additionally, the NYC operated sleeping cars direct from New York City to Thendara via the North Star until April 1959. The Iroquois continued direct sleeper service to Thendara to at least the fall 1964 timetable.

On April 24, 1965, year-round daily passenger trains ceased serving the station, with the closing of passenger traffic on the NYC's Adirondack Division.
