= Remsen station =

Remsen
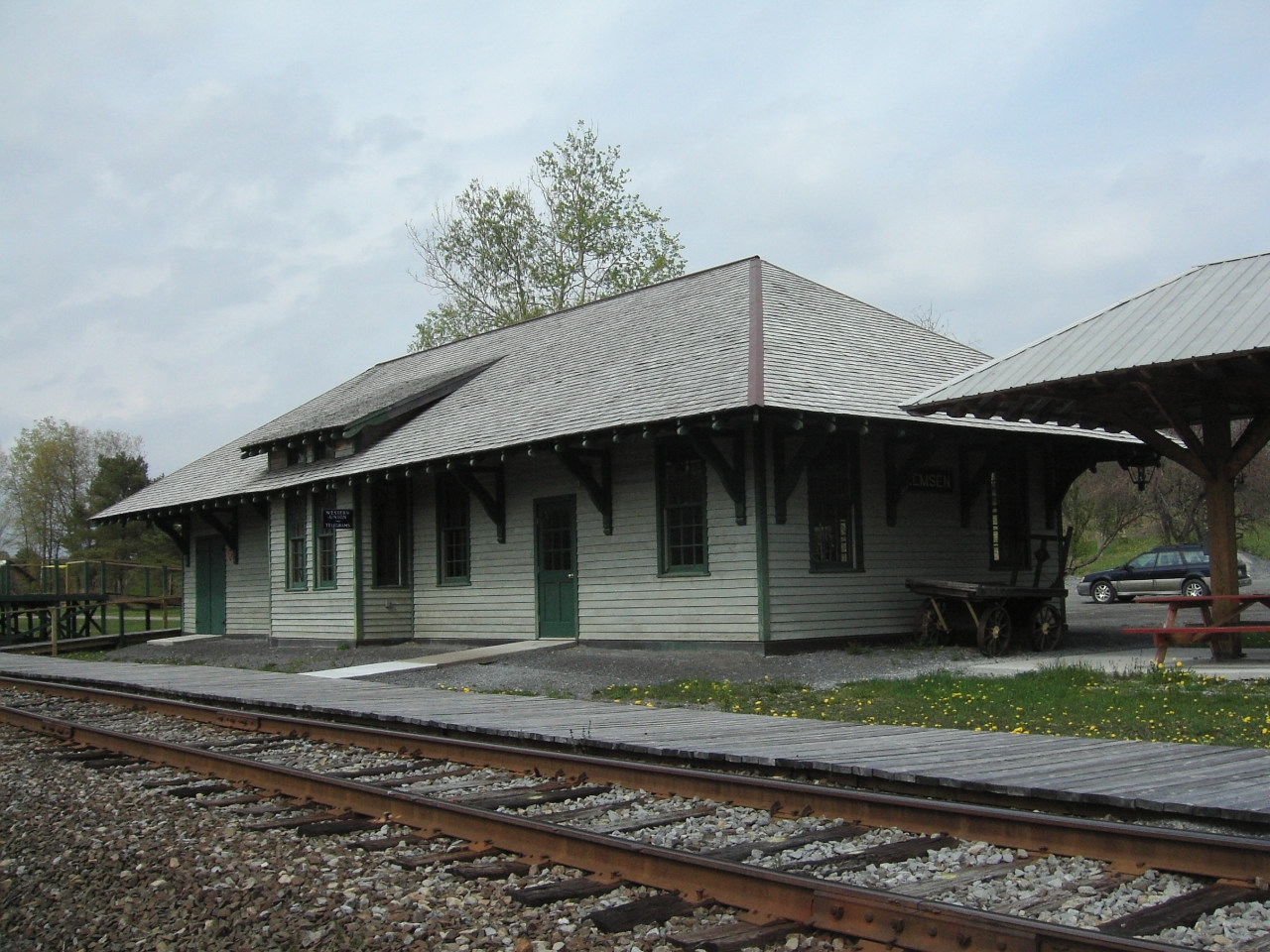
- Remsen depot in 2005

General information
- Location: 10613 Depot Street; Remsen, NY 13438
- Coordinates: 43°19′46″N 75°11′07″W
- System: Adirondack Scenic Railroad station
- Platforms: 1 side platform
- Tracks: 1

Construction
- Structure type: At-grade

History
- Opened: 1855
- Rebuilt: 1999

Services
| Preceding station | Adirondack Railroad | Following station |
|---|---|---|
| Holland Patent toward Utica | Main Line | Kayuta Trestle toward Tupper Lake |
Location

Remsen station is an historic train station in Remsen, New York. It serves as a flag stop on the Adirondack Scenic Railroad and has been serving trains since the 19th century.

== History ==
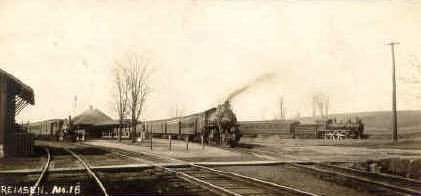
The station in the early 1900s

In December, 1855, the railway tracks from Utica to Boonville were built by the Black River & Utica Railroad. That railway underwent a foreclosure sale in 1958 and was reorganized as the Utica & Black River Railroad.

The New York Central Railroad (NYC) operated multiple trains daily through the station through the first half of the 20th century on its Adirondack Division. Additionally, the NYC operated sleeping cars direct from New York City to Remsen via the North Star until April 1959. Thereafter, the NYC's Iroquois carried sleeping cars that made stops at the station. The company's passenger trains stopped making stops there en route to Utica, New York's Utica Union Station between 1959 and 1960.

In 1999, the station was rebuilt on the same site and to the same plans as the original station. The station currently serves the Adirondack Scenic Railroad.

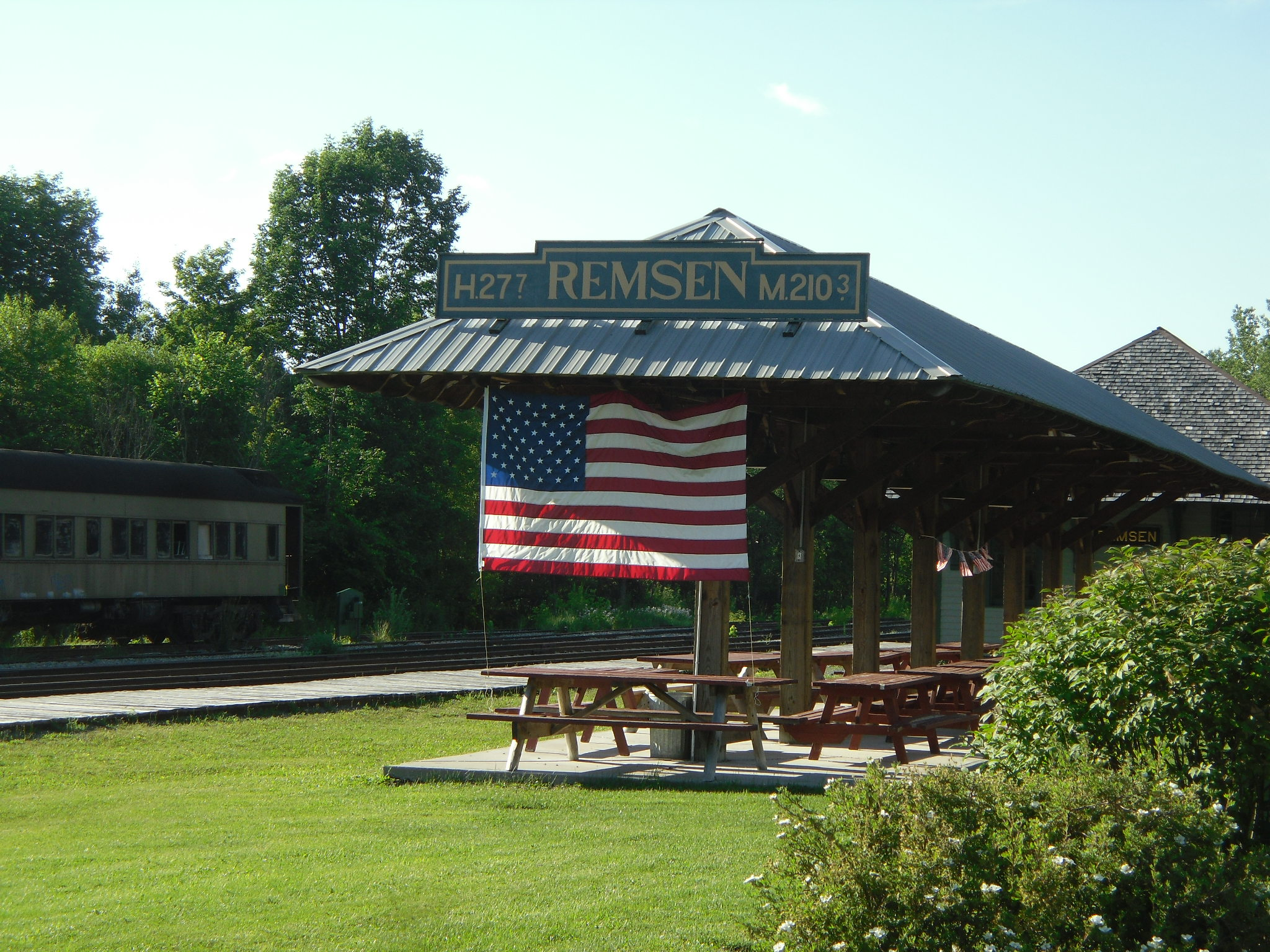
Remsen Depot in 2010
