= Thendara, New York =

- Thendara Historic District
- U.S. National Register of Historic Places
- U.S. Historic district
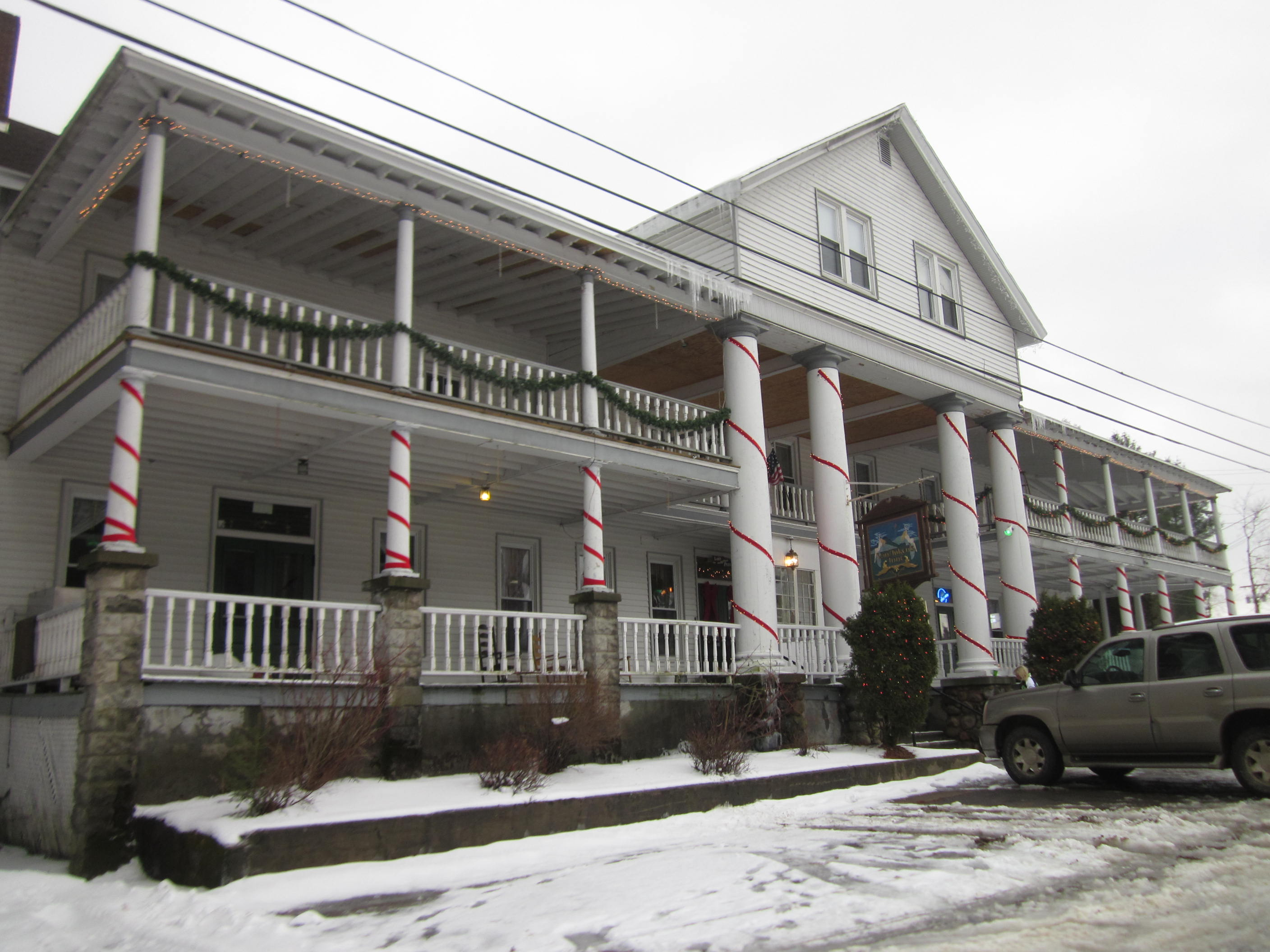
- Van Auken's Inne, January 2012

- Location within New York Location within the United States
- Nearest city: Roughly bounded by Birch St. and Forge St., Thendara, New York
- Coordinates: 43°42′02″N 74°59′42″W
- NRHP reference No.: 10000897
- Added to NRHP: November 10, 2010

Thendara is a hamlet and census-designated place (CDP) in Herkimer County, New York, United States. Thendara is located in the Adirondack Park, in the southern part of the town of Webb, west of Old Forge on Route 28. As of the 2020 census, Thendara had a population of 195.

Thendara station is a station on the Adirondack Railroad; it was formerly the northern terminus of most northbound trains from Utica, which was extended to Tupper Lake in late spring, 2023. It was formerly known as "Fulton Chain", and was the junction of the Fulton Chain Railway with the Mohawk and Malone Railway (the latter now used by the scenic railroad).

The New York Central Railroad Adirondack Division Historic District was added to the National Register of Historic Places in 1993. The Thendara Historic District was listed in 2010.

Thendara was the site of early efforts to settle the town of Webb in 1811, but the effort failed.

== Famous people ==
Writer and acamedician Camille Paglia spent summers at Girl Scouts camp in Thendara.

== Gallery ==
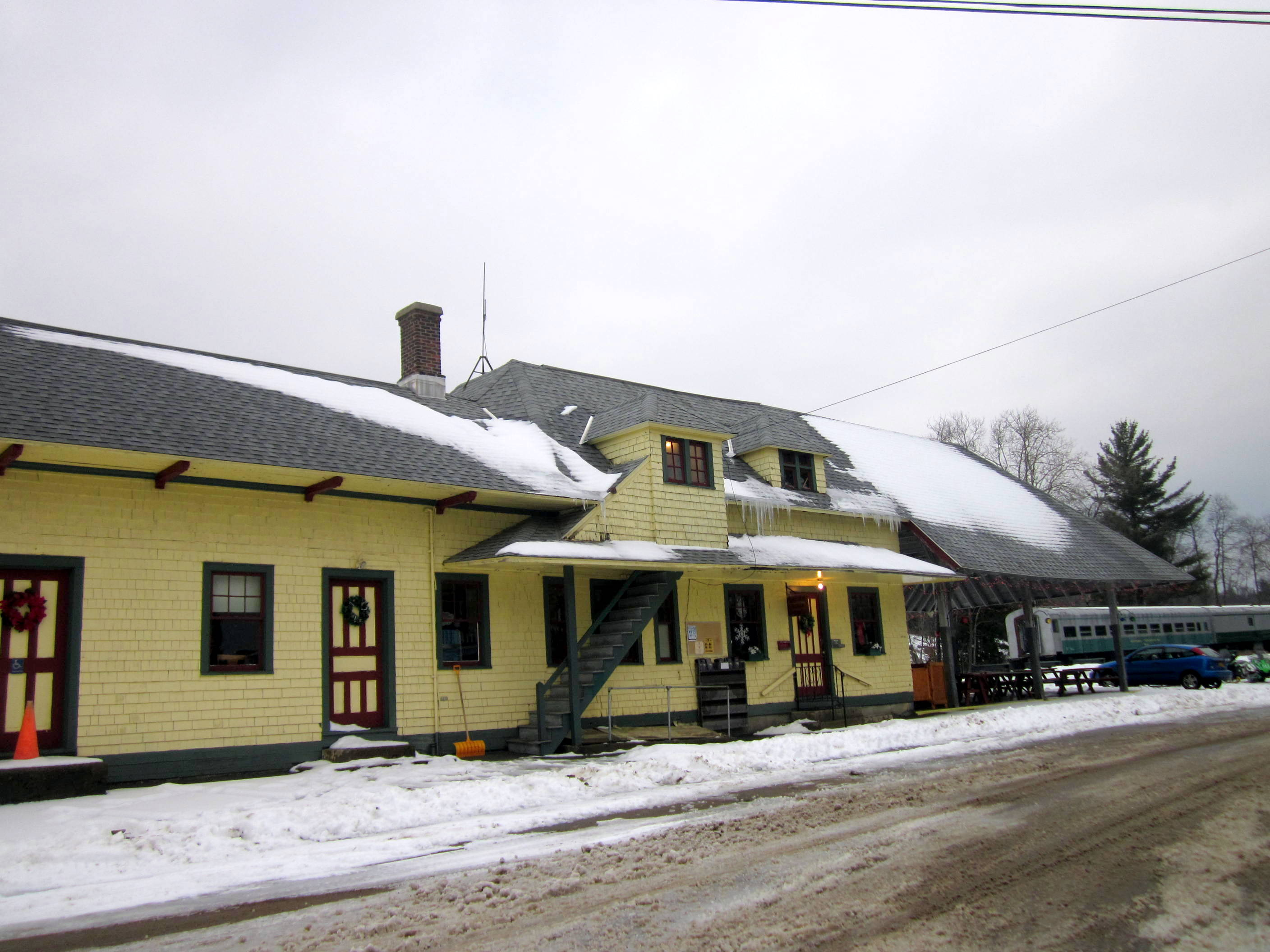
Thendara station in January 2012
