= Adirondack Railway (disambiguation) =

Adirondack Railway may refer to:

- Adirondack Railway, a predecessor of the Delaware and Hudson Canal Company
- Adirondack Railway (1976–1981), a heritage railroad which ran between Utica and Lake Placid, New York, during the 1980 Winter Olympics
- Adirondack Scenic Railroad, a modern successor to the Adirondack Railway between Utica and Lake Placid
