= Lowville and Beaver River Railroad =

Short-line railroad in New York, USA

- Industry: Rail Transport
- Founded: September 17, 1903
- Defunct: January 14, 2025
- Fate: Abandonment Approved by STB
- Headquarters: Batavia, New York
- Area served: Lewis County, New York

The Lowville and Beaver River Railroad (reporting mark LBR) was a short-line railroad that was owned by Genesee Valley Transportation (GVT) of Batavia, New York from 1993 to November 2025. Click here for an archived System Map.

The Lowville & Beaver River ran from an interchange, with GVT subsidiary Mohawk, Adirondack and Northern Railroad (MHWA) at Lowville, NY to Croghan, New York.

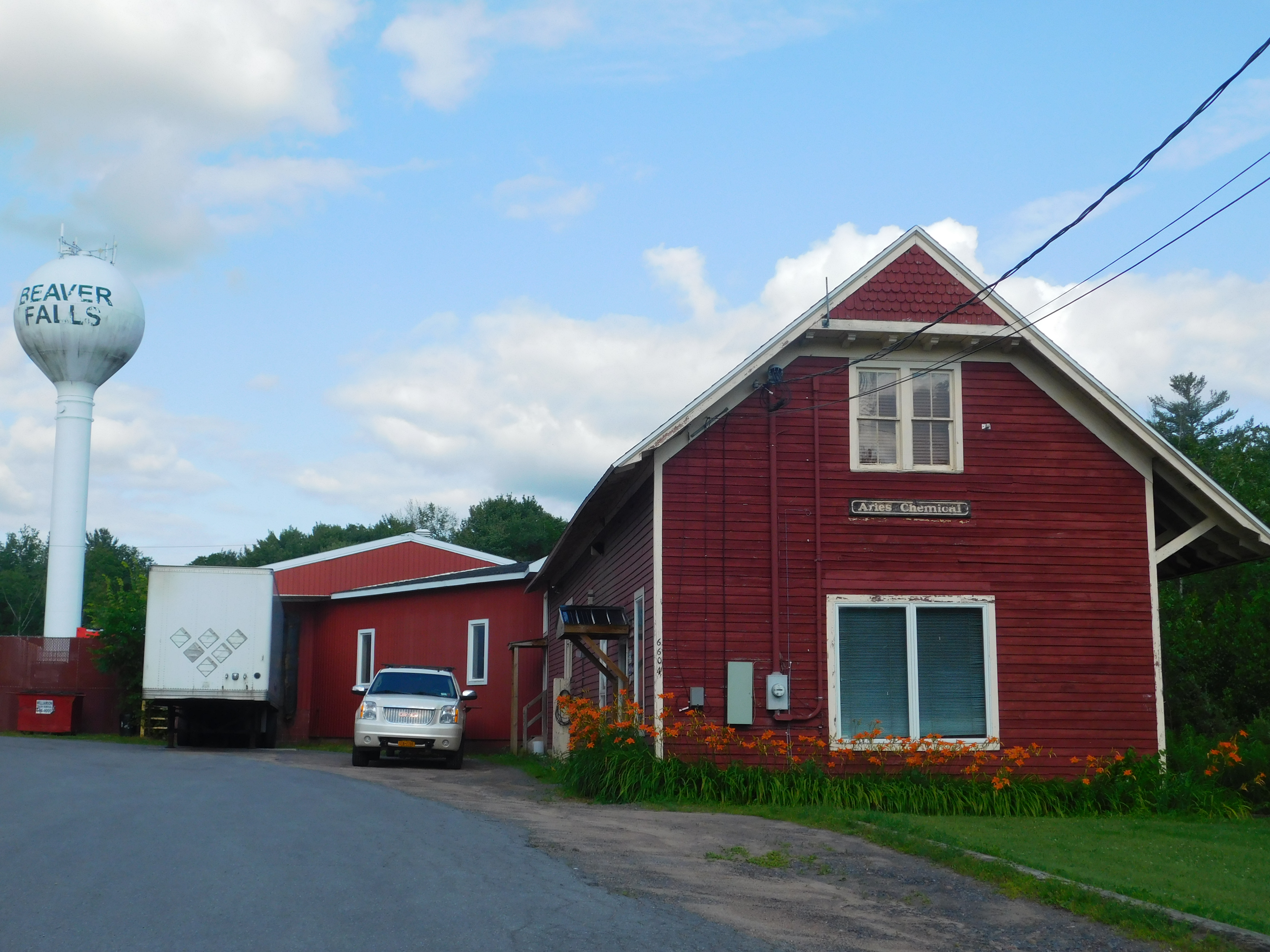
Beaver Falls station in Beaver Falls, New York. 14 July 2019

== History ==
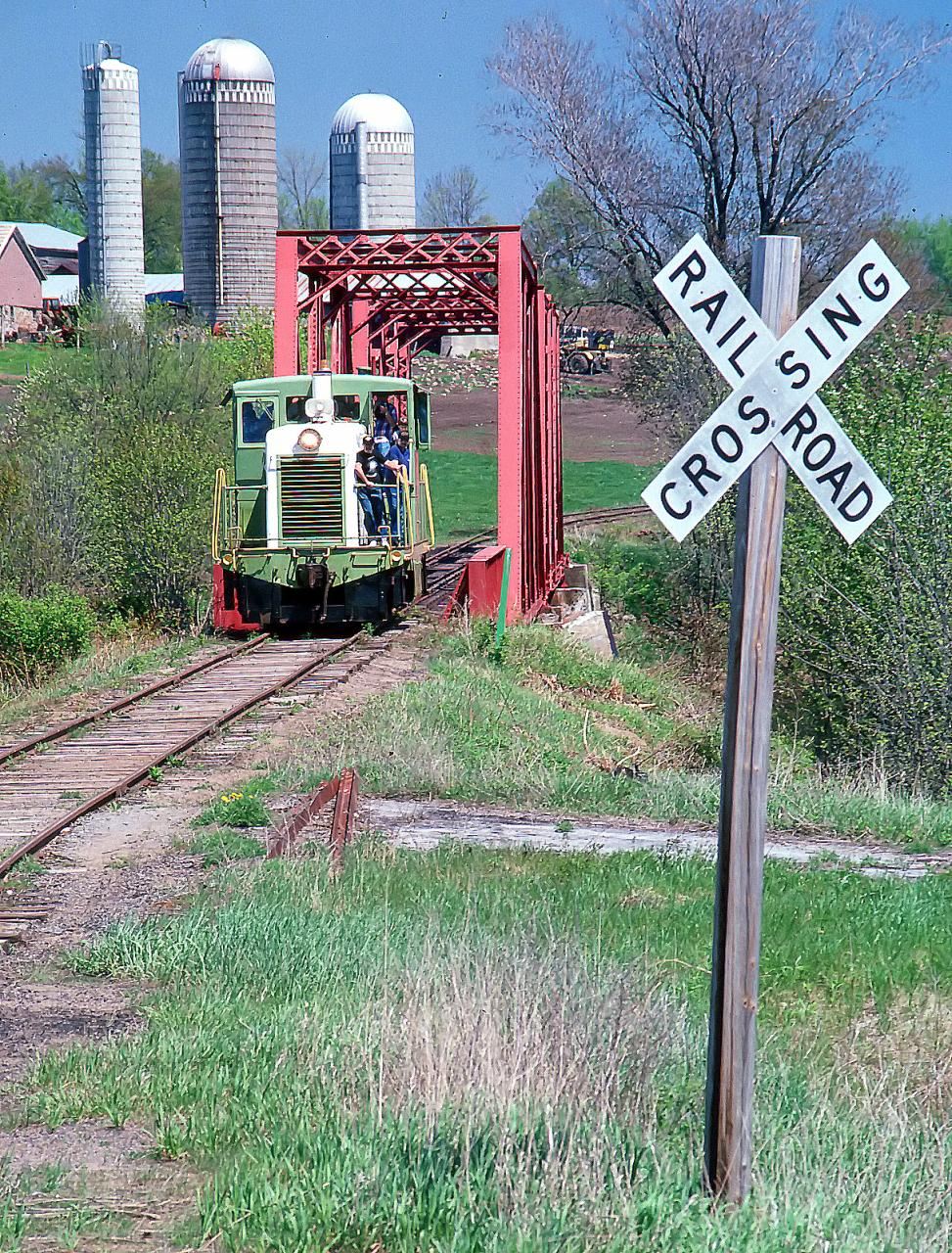
Lowville and Beaver River RR crossing the Black River near Lowville, NY May 1991.

The Lowville & Beaver River Railroad interchanged at Lowville with the Utica & Black River Railroad (U&BR). The U&BR reached Lowville in 1868 and Carthage in 1871. The L&BR was an 11-mile shortline from Lowville through Beaver Falls to Croghan planned in 1880 but it was not built.

In 1903 James P. Lewis backed the short line to serve his mills at Beaver Falls. The Lowville & Beaver River Railroad was open on January 13, 1906.

The L&BR was dieselized in 1947, while #1923, their remaining steam locomotive, was last used on standby service in case the diesel needed repairs. It last operated in January 1957. The L&BR likes to call 1912 "12" and 1923 "23". The locomotives of the L&BR were numbered 10 (4-4-0), 1912 (4-6-0), 1923 (2-8-0, Also a sister engine of A&A 18 and Minaz 1549, 1414, and 1824), 1947 (GE-44 Tonner Diesel), 1950 (GE-44 Tonner Diesel), 1951 (GE-44 Tonner Diesel) and 8, a Shay owned by the Railway Historical Society of Northern New York. All of the diesels are GE 44-tonners.

From 2010 to 2012, Lewis County and GVT negotiated the sale of the LBR infrastructure to the county. Plans called for the LBR route, which was offered for $425,000, to be used for a museum train operated by the Railroad Society of Northern New York, which had been based in Croghan in the mid-1990s. The MHWA route from Lowville to Carthage was also to be sold to the county and converted to a rail trail. On April 30, 2012, however, the county decided against purchasing the infrastructure.

River Marine Inc. of Cape Vincent, NY recently purchased the former Carthage train depot on Mechanic Street. River Marine also owns the railway yard in Lowville, NY. Ronald J. Trottier the owner of River Marine Inc. plans to lease the railroad between Cartage and Lowville. His plan is to run tourist trains and rail bikes, human-pedal-powered open air vehicles that ride the rails.

The #1923 steam locomotive, an Alco 2-8-0, has been preserved as part of the Steamtown, USA National Historic Site, Scranton, PA.

The L&BR was placed out-of-service after the paper mill in Beaver Falls closed on January 24, 2007.

The Lowville and Beaver River Railroad filed for abandonment on January 14, 2025 and entered into an agreement with Lewis County in November 2025 to be purchased for use as a recreational rail trail.

This is in addition to the abandonment of the West Carthage to Lowville segment of fellow with GVT subsidiary Mohawk, Adirondack and Northern Railroad at the same time. The Lowville-to-Carthage branch line had only seen occasional revenue car storage on its northernmost portion.

== Infrastructure ==
The 10.57-mile (17.01 km) long route of the LBR ran from Lowville through the valley of the Beaver River via New Bremen and Beaver Falls to Croghan. In Lowville, there was a connection to the MHWA route to Carthage, which was part of a connection formerly running from Utica to Clayton on the St. Lawrence River, but whose section from Lowville south to Lyons Falls was abandoned in 1964. The LBR had a small depot in Lowville.

The branch line crossed the Black River on a 1,100-foot (340 m) long Warren swing through truss bridge.
