= Holland Patent station =

Holland Patent
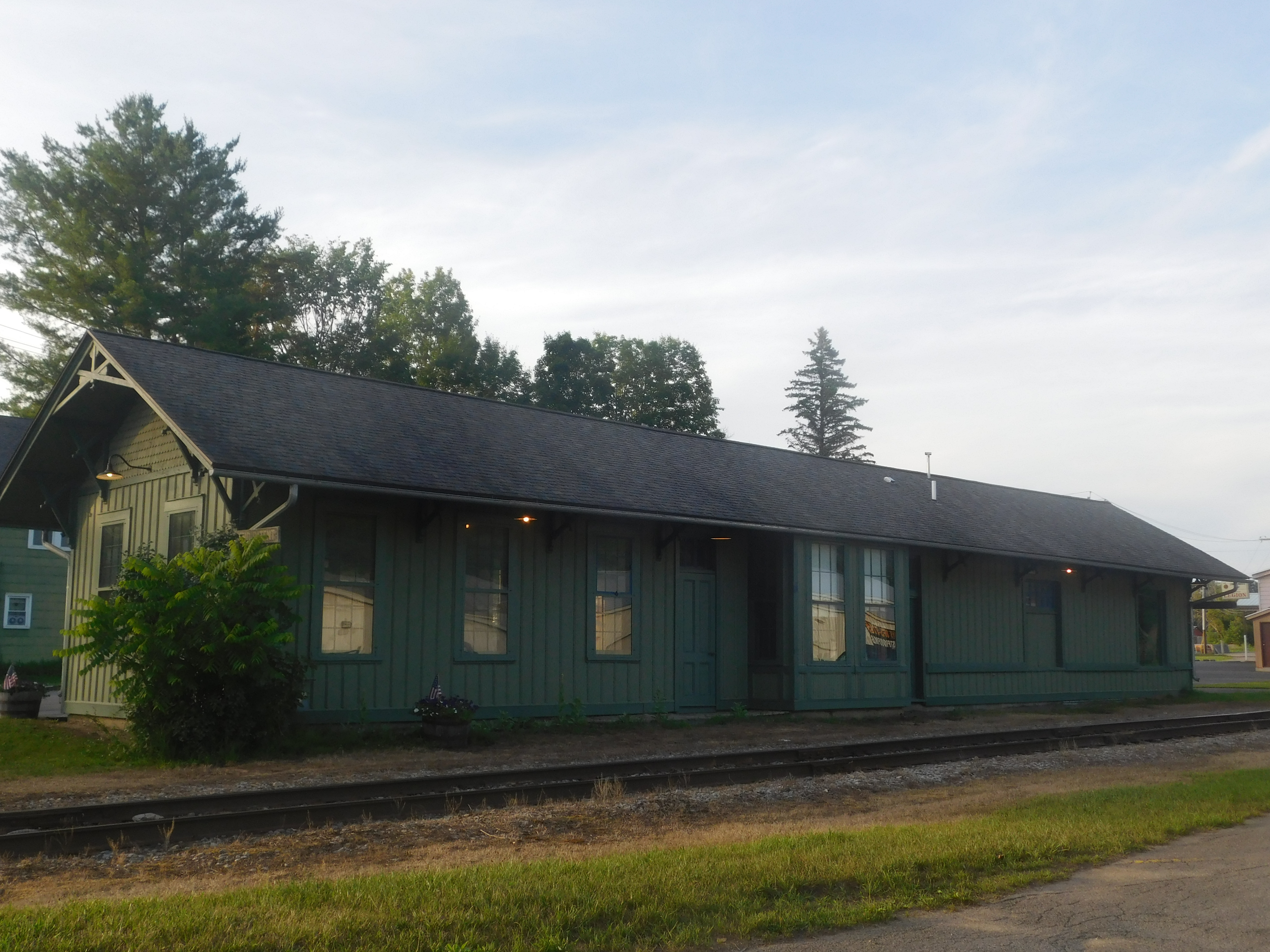
- Holland Patent station in July 2020.

General information
- Location: Park Avenue, Holland Patent, New York; United States
- Coordinates: 43°14′24″N 75°15′17″W
- System: Adirondack Scenic Railroad station
- Platforms: 1 side platform
- Tracks: 1

History
- Opened: 1890
- Rebuilt: 2003

Services
Preceding station	Adirondack Railroad	Following station
Utica Terminus	Main Line	Remsen toward Tupper Lake
Former services
Preceding station	New York Central Railroad	Following station
Stittville toward Utica	St. Lawrence Division	Barnevald toward Ogdensburg
Stittville toward Utica	Adirondack Division	Barnevald toward Montreal
- Holland Patent Railroad Station
- U.S. National Register of Historic Places
- Location within New York Location within the United States
- Location: Park Ave., Holland Patent, New York
- Area: less than one acre
- Built: 1890
- NRHP reference No.: 00000089
- Added to NRHP: February 25, 2000
Location

Holland Patent station is a historic train station located at Holland Patent in Oneida County, New York. It was built in 1890 and is a one-story, rectangular, wood-frame building sheathed in board-and-batten siding. It was built by the Utica and Black River Railroad, later acquired by New York Central. It was used until 1960 and now the line is used by the Adirondack Scenic Railroad.

The building was listed on the National Register of Historic Places in 2000 as Holland Patent Railroad Station, and according to a plaque on the building exterior, was renovated in 2003.

Views of Holland Patent Railroad Station
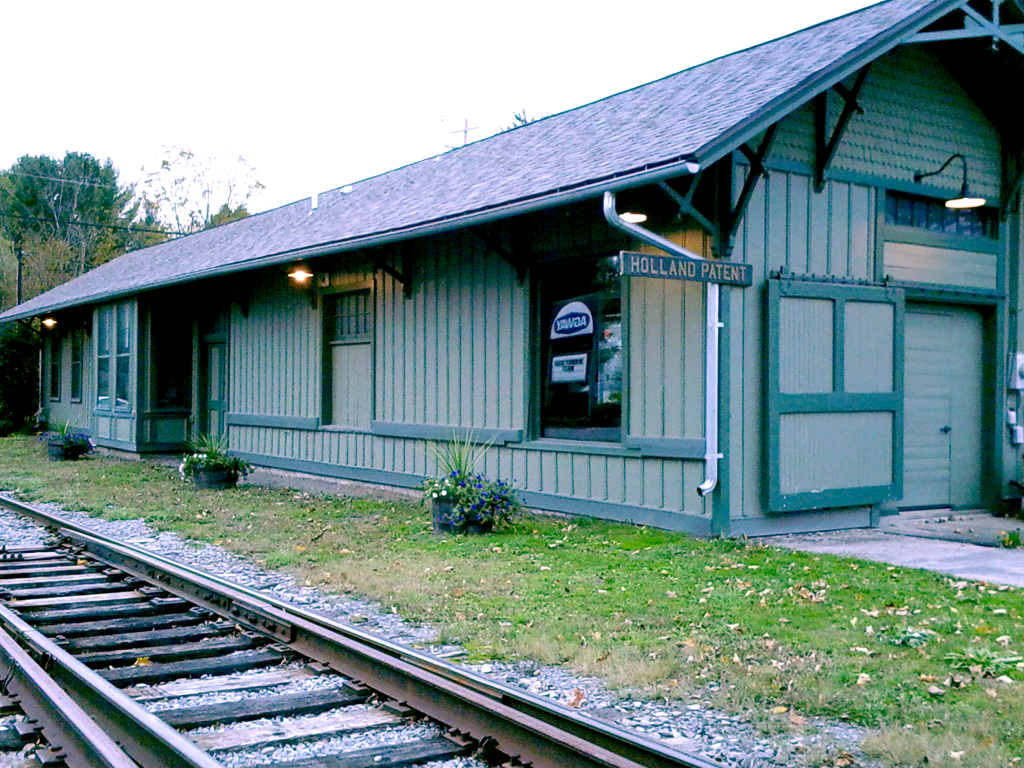
Rear view, showing train tracks.

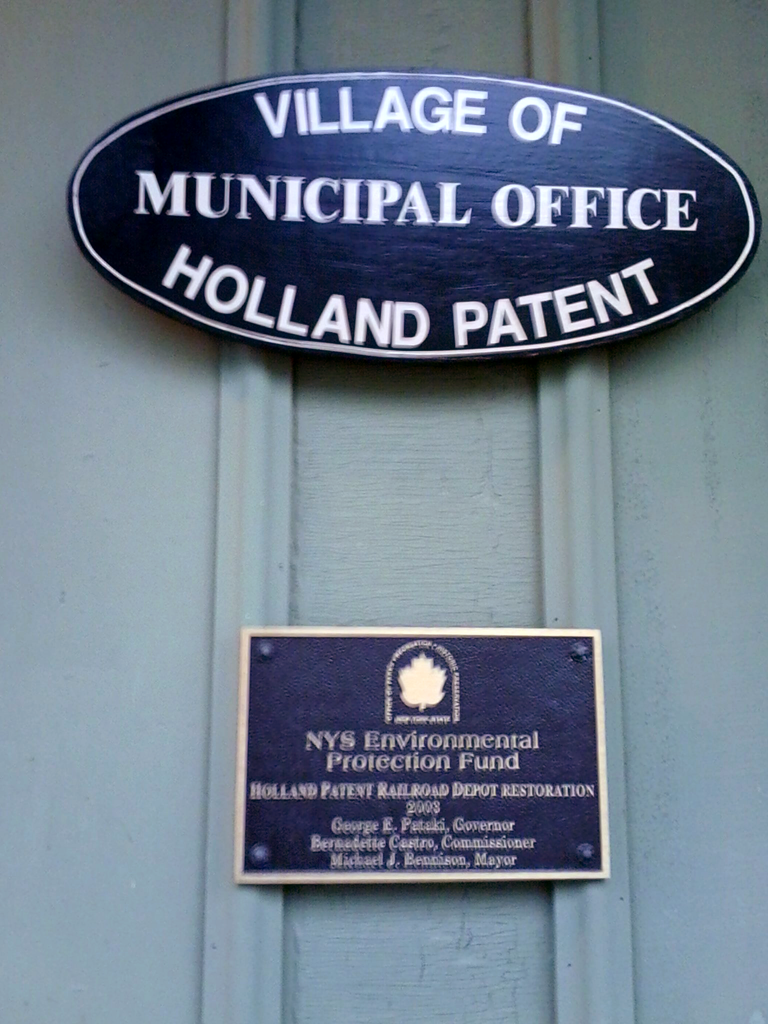
Plaques on Holland Patent Train Station
