= Mohawk, Adirondack and Northern Railroad =

Shortline railroad in New York state, U.S.

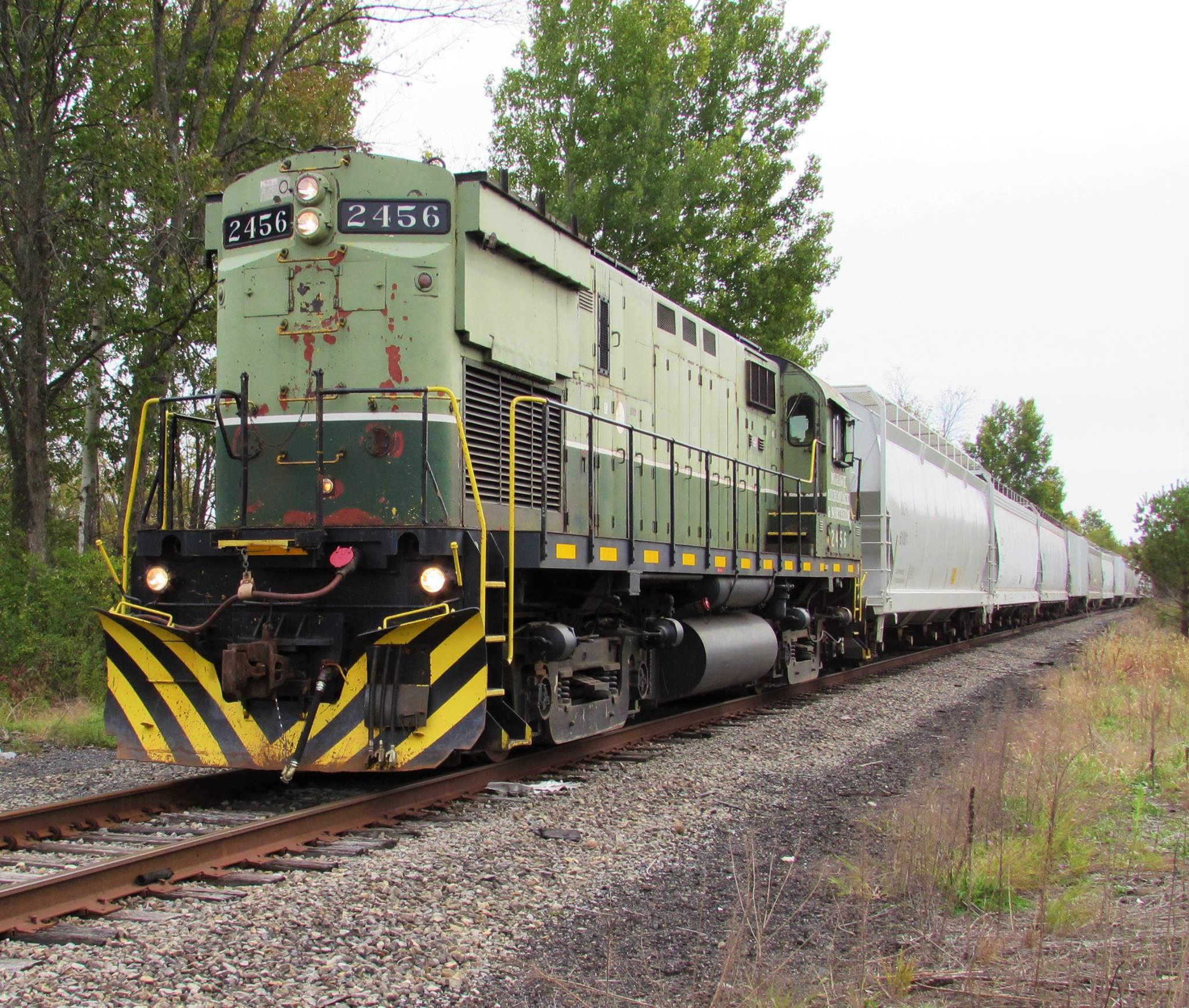
- Mohawk Adirondack & Northern engine pulling freight cars to Boonville

Overview
- Headquarters: Batavia, New York; Utica, New York (MHWA Shop)
- Reporting mark: MHWA
- Locale: New York
- Dates of operation: 1991–present

Technical
- Track gauge: 4 ft 8 1/2 in (1,435 mm) standard gauge

The Mohawk, Adirondack and Northern Railroad (MA&N) (reporting mark MHWA) is a class III railroad operating in Central and Northern New York. Specifically, it serves Oneida, Jefferson, and St. Lawrence counties. It operates over trackage of the former New York Central Railroad.

Class I and II regional railroad partners are CSX Transportation (interchanging in Utica and Carthage) and New York, Susquehanna & Western (interchanging in Utica).

The railroad is a subsidiary of Genesee Valley Transportation Company.

== Southern Division ==
This division operates 45-mile (72 km) of track from Utica, through Holland Patent, Remsen, Boonville, and terminating in Lyons Falls.

The Adirondack Scenic Railroad has trackage rights over the line from Utica to Remsen for a tourist railroad operation.

The southern division also operates a 7-mile (11 km) spur into the city of Rome off the CSX mainline. The spur is accessed with trackage rights for 13-mile (21 km) over the CSX track from the Utica interchange to the Rome spur junction.

== Northern Division ==
The northern division operates a 46-mile (74 km) line running northeast and east from Carthage to Newton Falls.

The line fell into disuse after the closure of a paper mill in Newton Falls in 2000. From 2023 to 2025, a number of projects funded by the New York State Department of Transportation and the St. Lawrence County Industrial Development Agency were undertaken to rehabilitate the line. The first revenue train in 25 years operated from Carthage to Benson Mines on November 7, 2025.

The northern division also operated the West Carthage to Lowville segment, which was abandoned on January 14, 2025 after years of disuse. The Black River crossing's approaches were removed in recent years cutting it off from the rail network. The Lowville-to-Carthage branch line had only seen occasional revenue car storage on its northernmost portion since the LB&R was taken out of service in 2007.

This is in addition to the abandonment of fellow GVT subsidiary, the Lowville and Beaver River Railroad which also filed for abandonment on January 14, 2025. GVT entered into an agreement with Lewis County in November 2025 for both lines within Lewis County to be purchased for use as recreational rail trails.
