= Lake Placid station =

Lake Placid
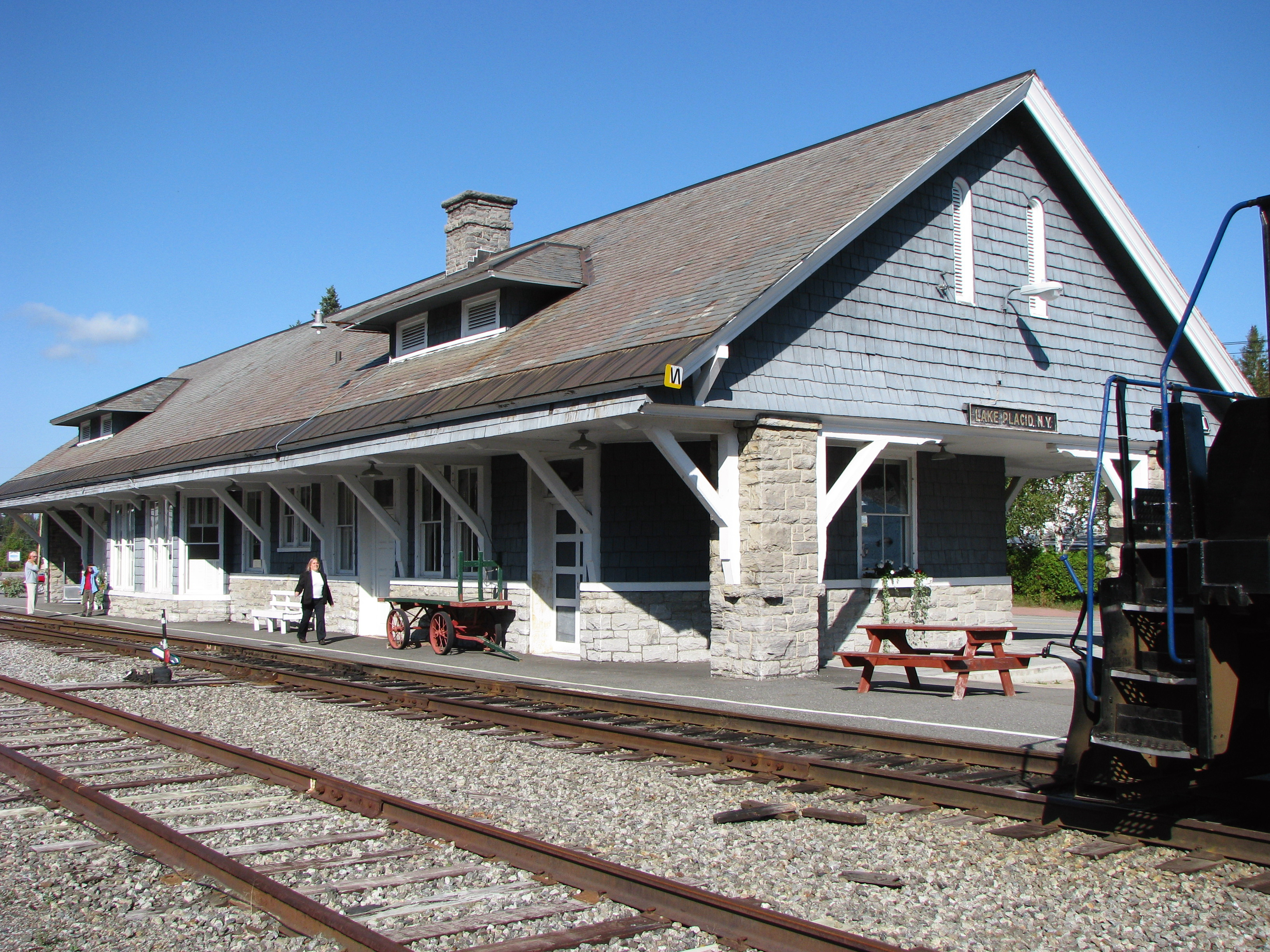

General information
- Location: 242 Station Street, Lake Placid, New York
- Coordinates: 44°16′34″N 73°59′10″W
- Platforms: 1 side platform
- Tracks: 2

History
- Opened: 1904
- Former names: New York Central

Former services
Preceding station	Delaware and Hudson Railway	Following station
Raybrook toward Champlain	Champlain – Lake Placid	Terminus
Preceding station	New York Central Railroad	Following station
Raybrook toward Lake Clear Junction	Saranac Branch	Terminus
Preceding station	Adirondack Railroad	Following station
Saranac Lake toward Utica	Main Line	Terminus
Location

The Lake Placid Station is a former railroad station, built by the Delaware and Hudson Railway in Lake Placid, New York.

In the post-World War II period, the NYC's North Star train, and later, the Iroquois, provided direct sleeping car service from New York City's Grand Central Terminal to Lake Placid. During summers the NYC's Interstate Express ran sleeping cars direct from Chicago to Lake Placid via Utica. On April 24, 1965 the NYC ran its final train on the route.

== See also ==
- New York Central Railroad Adirondack Division Historic District
