= Saranac Lake Union Depot =

Saranac Lake
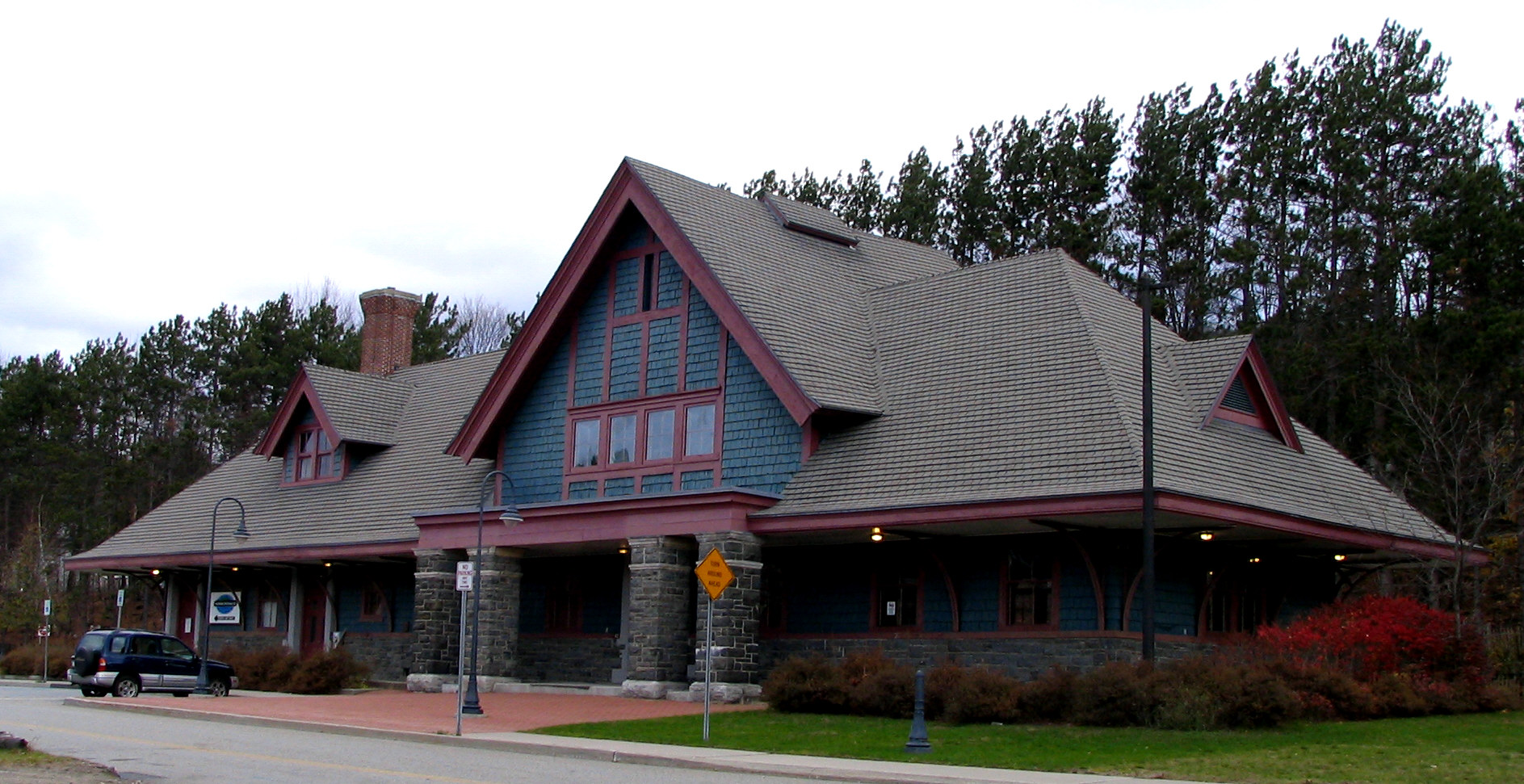

General information
- Location: 42 Depot Street, Saranac Lake, New York 12983
- Coordinates: 44°19′51″N 74°07′57″W
- Owner: New York State Department of Transportation

History
- Opened: 1904
- Closed: 1965 (passenger service); 1972 (freight service)
- Rebuilt: 1997–98
- Former names: New York Central

Former services
Preceding station	Delaware and Hudson Railway	Following station
Ray Brook toward Lake Placid	Champlain – Lake Placid	Bloomingdale toward Champlain
Preceding station	Adirondack Railroad	Following station
Tupper Lake toward Utica	Main Line Truncated to Tupper Lake in 2016	Lake Placid Terminus
Location

Saranac Lake Union Depot is a former New York Central Railroad station in Saranac Lake, New York. It was built in 1904 by the Delaware and Hudson Railway. In its heyday, the station served several daily trains going north to Malone, New York, on to Montreal, Quebec, and south to Utica, New York and Grand Central Terminal in New York City. Passenger coaches went direct from New York City to Saranac Lake until late 1952 or early 1953. Direct sleeping cars from trains such as North Star and then Iroquois continued as late as 1964 to the station. Tourist trains were operated on the 8-mile sector between Saranac Lake and Lake Placid by the Adirondack Railroad between 2000 and 2016. The tracks were removed in 2022 to enable construction of a rail-trail between Lake Placid and Tupper Lake, to be completed in 2024.

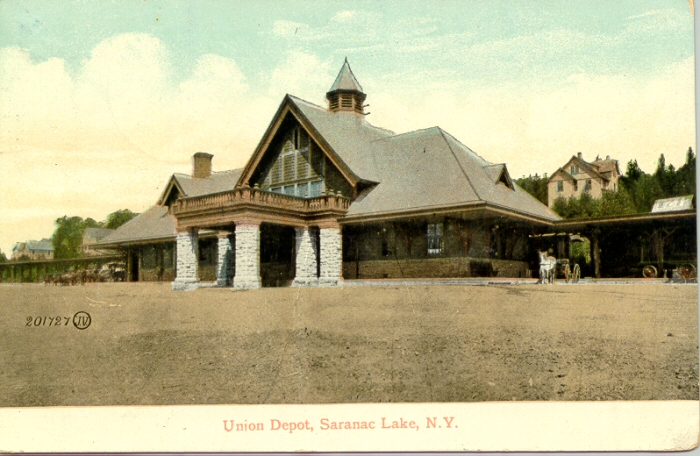
Station c. 1910

On April 24, 1965 the NYC ran its final train on the Adirondack Division route through Saranac Lake Union Depot to Utica Union Station. The station houses historic exhibits, a visitors center and gift shops, During its heyday, the station handled eighteen to twenty scheduled passenger trains per day.

== See also ==
- New York Central Railroad Adirondack Division Historic District
- Historic Saranac Lake
