= Adirondack and St. Lawrence Railroad =

Railroad in New York, United States

The Adirondack and St. Lawrence Railroad operated between DeKalb Junction and Hermon in St. Lawrence County, New York, over a four-mile standard gauge railroad. The Adirondack & St. Lawrence was owned by the St. Lawrence Pyrites Company and incorporated on April 19, 1906, and shortly thereafter the line was opened. A parallel railroad of the Clifton Iron Company, was abandoned in the early 1870s. Traffic was low and in 1925 the A.& St.L. line was abandoned and torn up. Still today the right-of-way can be observed near East DeKalb. In Hermon, the roadbed is now used by Water Street.

The timetable which took effect on September 26, 1909, included four trains Monday through Saturday and one train on Sundays. The trains usually made connections at DeKalb Junction to the Rome, Watertown and Ogdensburg Railroad. Sunday passenger traffic ended the following year and in 1912, one of the four trains was cancelled altogether. The February 1920 timetable provides only two trains.

== See also ==
- Mohawk and Malone Railway
