= Adirondack Railway (1976–1981) =

Railroad in New York, United States

Overview
- Headquarters: Old Forge, New York
- Reporting mark: ADIR
- Locale: New York
- Dates of operation: 1979–1981
- Successor: Adirondack Scenic Railroad

Technical
- Track gauge: 4 ft 8 1/2 in (1,435 mm)
- Length: 118 miles (190 km)

The Adirondack Railway (reporting mark ADIR) was a short-lived tourist railroad which operated in northeastern New York. The company was founded in 1976 to operate a disused railway line owned by New York State since 1974. It operated trains between 1979 and 1981, including from Utica to Lake Placid, New York, for the 1980 Winter Olympics, before multiple derailments led to the end of service. The route is now operated by the Adirondack Railroad from Utica to Thendara, Big Moose, and Tupper Lake.

== History ==
The company's route ran from Utica, New York, northeast to Lake Placid. This route was originally opened by the Mohawk and Malone Railway, a predecessor of the New York Central Railroad, in 1892. The New York Central and Hudson River Railroad purchased the line in 1894, and it was merged into the New York Central Railroad in 1913. The NYC maintained it as its Adirondack Division, with passenger service terminated on April 24, 1965. In 1972 the Penn Central Transportation Company, successor to the New York Central, discontinued its remaining freight operations between Remsen, New York, and Lake Placid. New York State purchased the line in 1974.

The Adirondack Railway was incorporated in 1976 to rehabilitate and operate passenger services on the line. Conrail, successor to Penn Central, still owned the Remsen–Utica portion but permitted the Adirondack to operate trains over it. The company spent $2.5 million rebuilding the section north of Remsen. Service began on October 9, 1979. In Utica the company used Union Station, with connections available to Amtrak's Empire Corridor services. The journey from Utica to Lake Placid required over five hours, with the maximum speed often 30 miles per hour (48 km/h). However, this was significantly hampered by no fewer than seven derailments. Service ended in August 1980, briefly resumed in September, and ended for good in February 1981.

== Rolling stock ==
The Adirondack Railway owned four diesel locomotives and 21 passenger cars. The passenger cars were steam heated and included coaches, a parlor car, a dining car, and a club car.
