= Holland Patent Stone Churches Historic District =

Historic church in New York, United States

- U.S. National Register of Historic Places
- U.S. Historic district
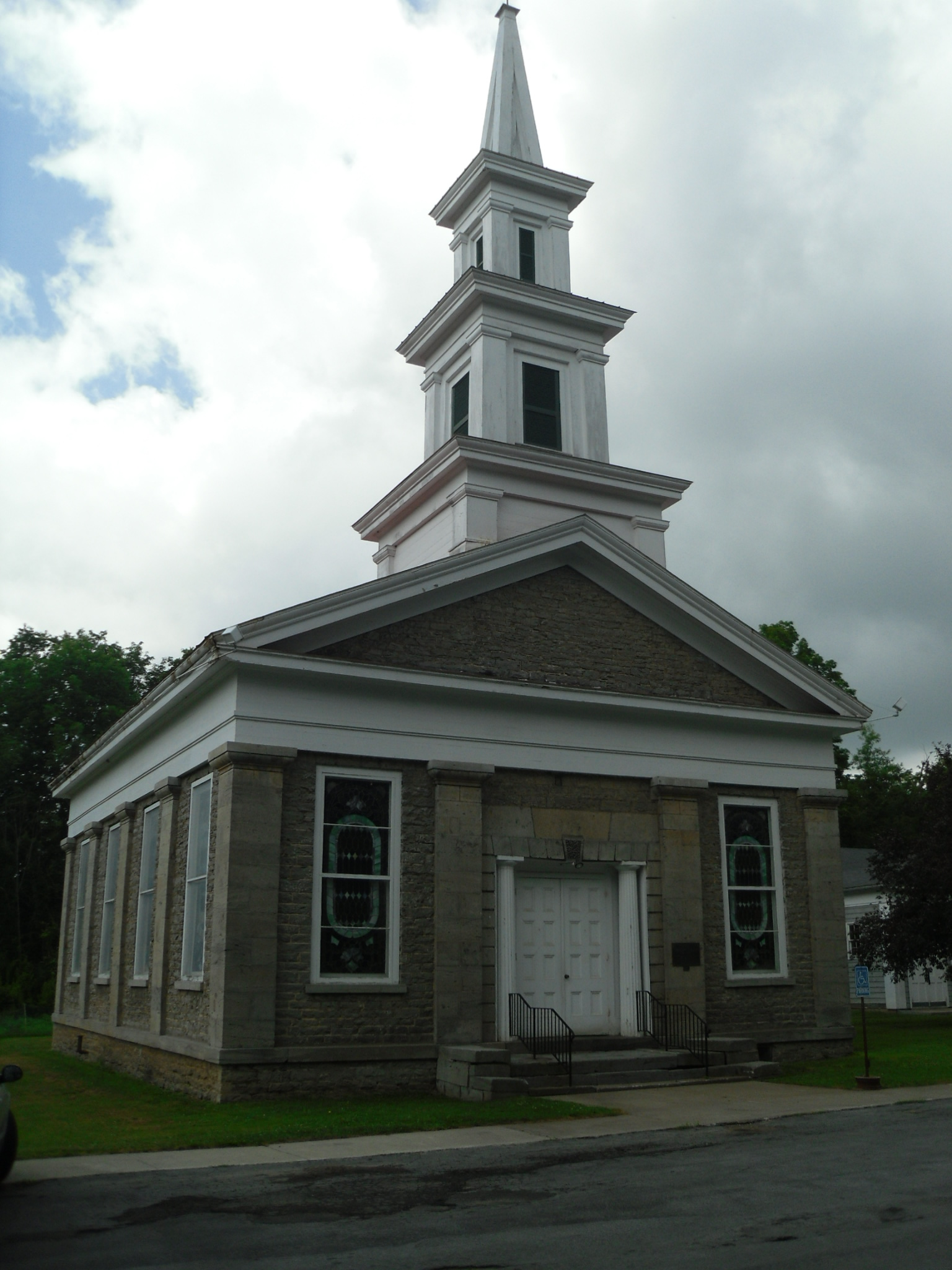
- Presbyterian Church, July 2010

- Location within New York Location within the United States
- Location: Roughly bounded by Main St., Park Ave., Park Pl. and Willow Cr., Holland Patent, New York
- Coordinates: 43°14′28″N 75°15′26″W
- Area: 5 acres (2.0 ha)
- Built: 1798
- Architect: Ackley, Charles; Rockwell, Andrew
- Architectural style: Greek Revival
- NRHP reference No.: 91001670
- Added to NRHP: November 21, 1991

Holland Patent Stone Churches Historic District is a national historic district located at Holland Patent in Oneida County, New York. The district includes four monumental Greek Revival churches, the village green, and an 1890s band stand / gazebo.

It was listed on the National Register of Historic Places in 1991.

== Gallery ==
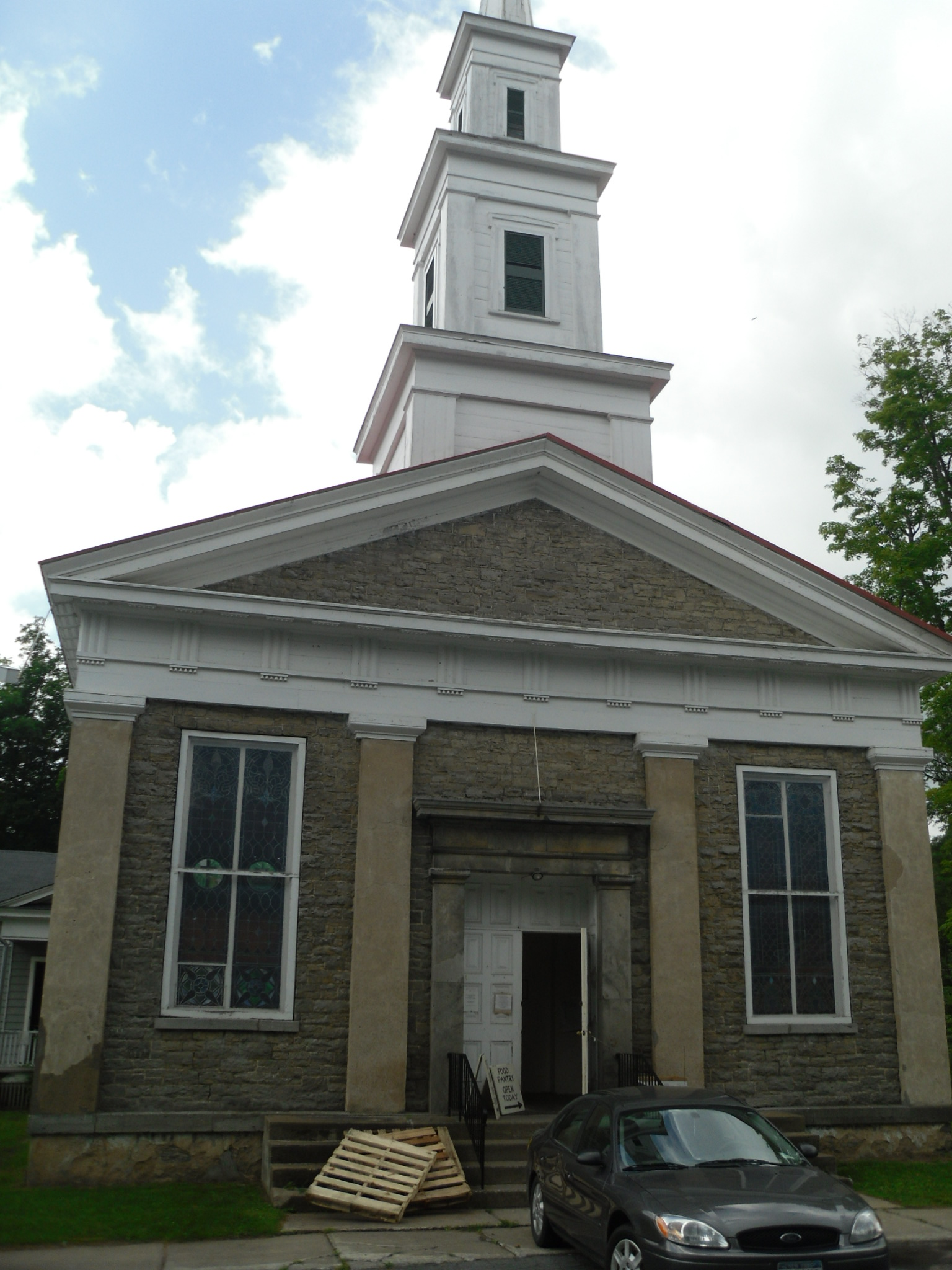
Former Baptist Church, July 2010

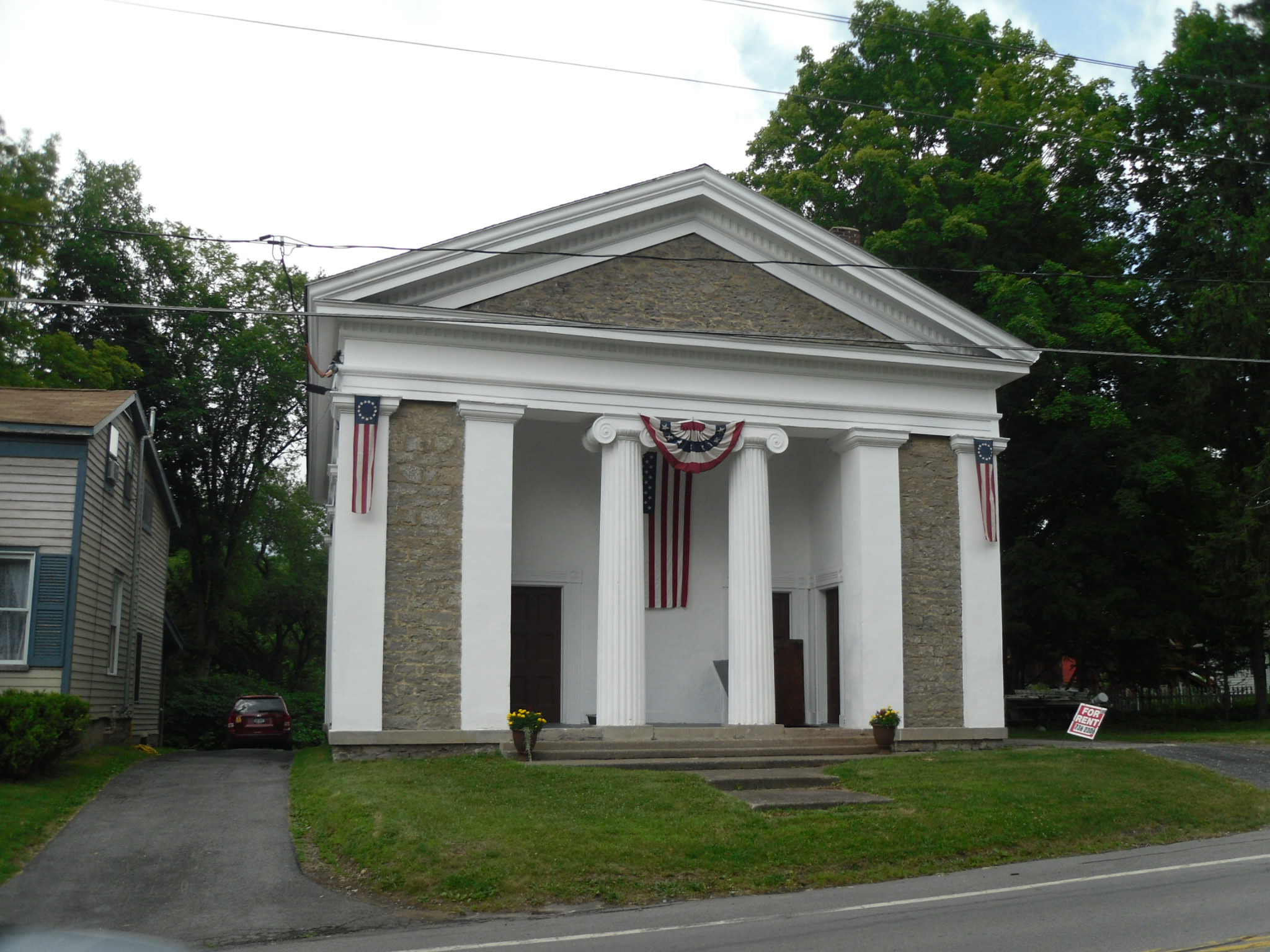
Former Unitarian Church, July 2010

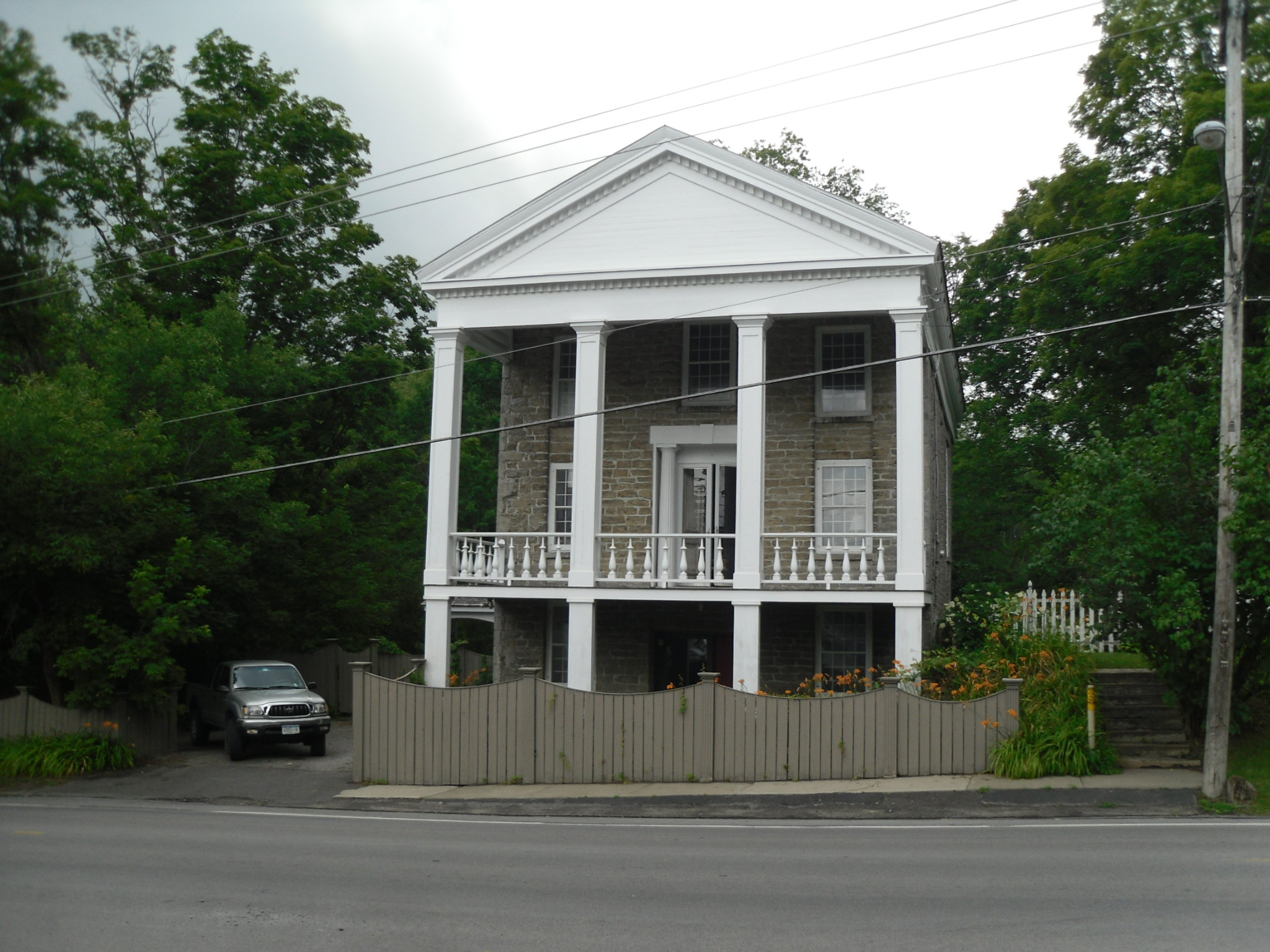
Former Congregational Church, July 2010

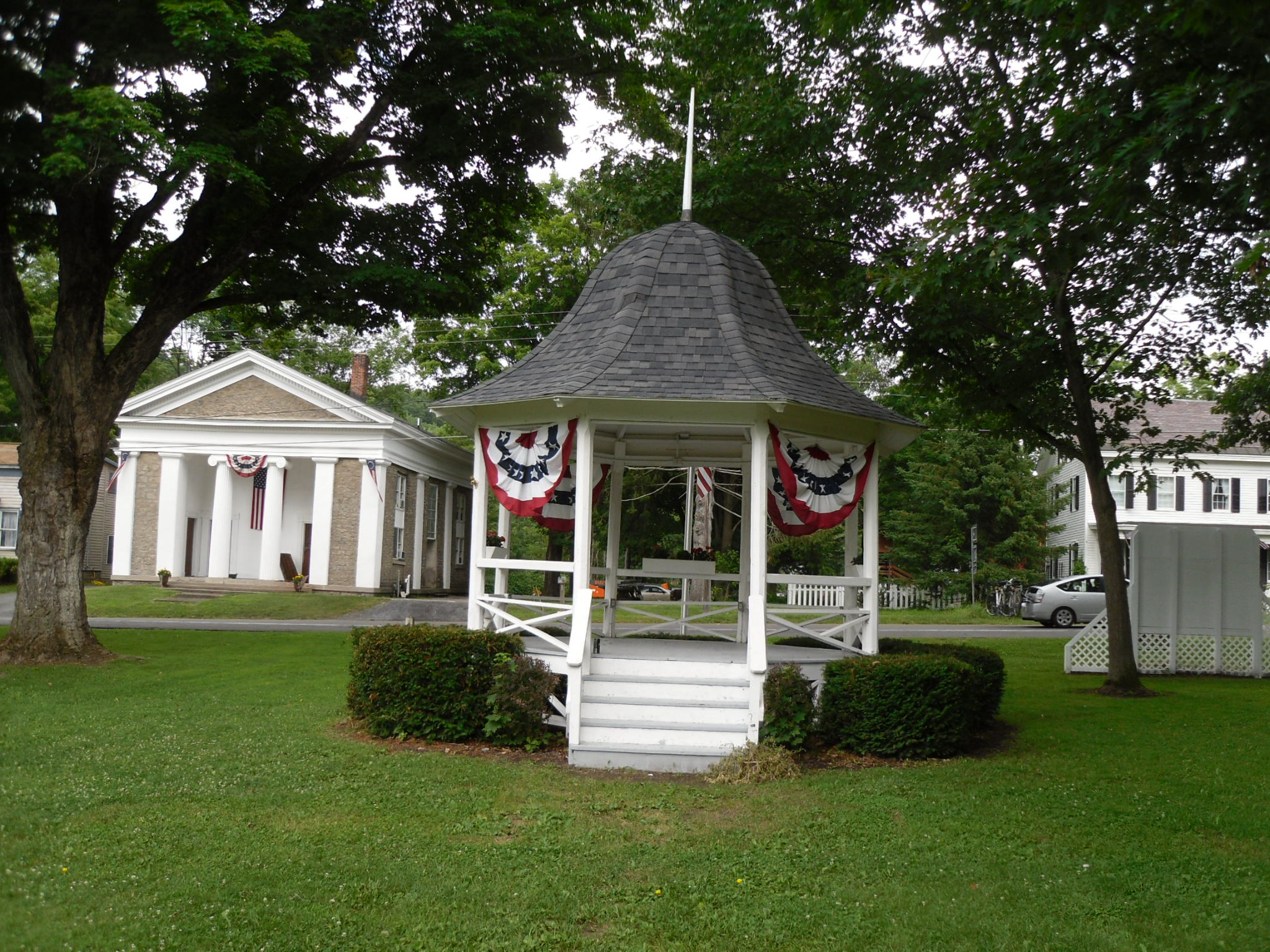
Bandstand, July 2010

== See also ==
- National Register of Historic Places listings in Oneida County, New York
