= Depew, Lancaster and Western Railroad =

Shortline Railway Operator

Overview
- Headquarters: Batavia, New York, U.S.
- Reporting mark: DLWR
- Locale: New York
- Dates of operation: 1989–

Technical
- Track gauge: 4 ft 8 1/2 in (1,435 mm) standard gauge

Other
- Website: Genesee Valley Transportation Co., Inc.

The Depew, Lancaster and Western Railroad (reporting mark DLWR) is a class III railroad operating in New York. It is a subsidiary of Genesee Valley Transportation (GVT). The DLWR is composed of two operations, one located between Depew, New York and Lancaster, New York and the other in Batavia, New York. Like other GVT subsidiaries, the railroad exclusively uses Alcos.

The Lancaster division runs from Depew to Lancaster and maintains trackage rights with the Norfolk Southern Railway to interchange at Bison Yard in Buffalo. The Batavia division runs in Batavia and interchanges with CSX Transportation.

The DLWR was formed in 1989 to purchase and operate former Delaware, Lackawanna and Western Railroad and Lehigh Valley Railroad trackage from Conrail. The DLWR owns two RS-11 locomotives and an RS-18 locomotive. The railroad also uses a GVT ALCO S-6 pooled with other GVT railroads. The RS-11s are numbered #1800 and #1804 while the RS-18 is numbered #1801. S6 is numbered 1044. Current work assignments have #1800 placed on the Lancaster division and #1044 placed on the Batavia division as well as the RS18 used as a "backup" engine. #1804 is currently assigned to another GVT subsidiary, the Delaware-Lackawanna Railroad.
