= Mohawk and Malone Railway =

Railway in New York and Quebec

Overview
- Locale: Northern Adirondacks at Tupper Lake Junction
- Dates of operation: 1892–1913
- Predecessor: Herkimer, Newport and Poland Railway
- Successor: New York Central

Technical
- Track gauge: 4 ft 8 1/2 in (1,435 mm) standard gauge
- Previous gauge: originally 3 ft (914 mm) gauge

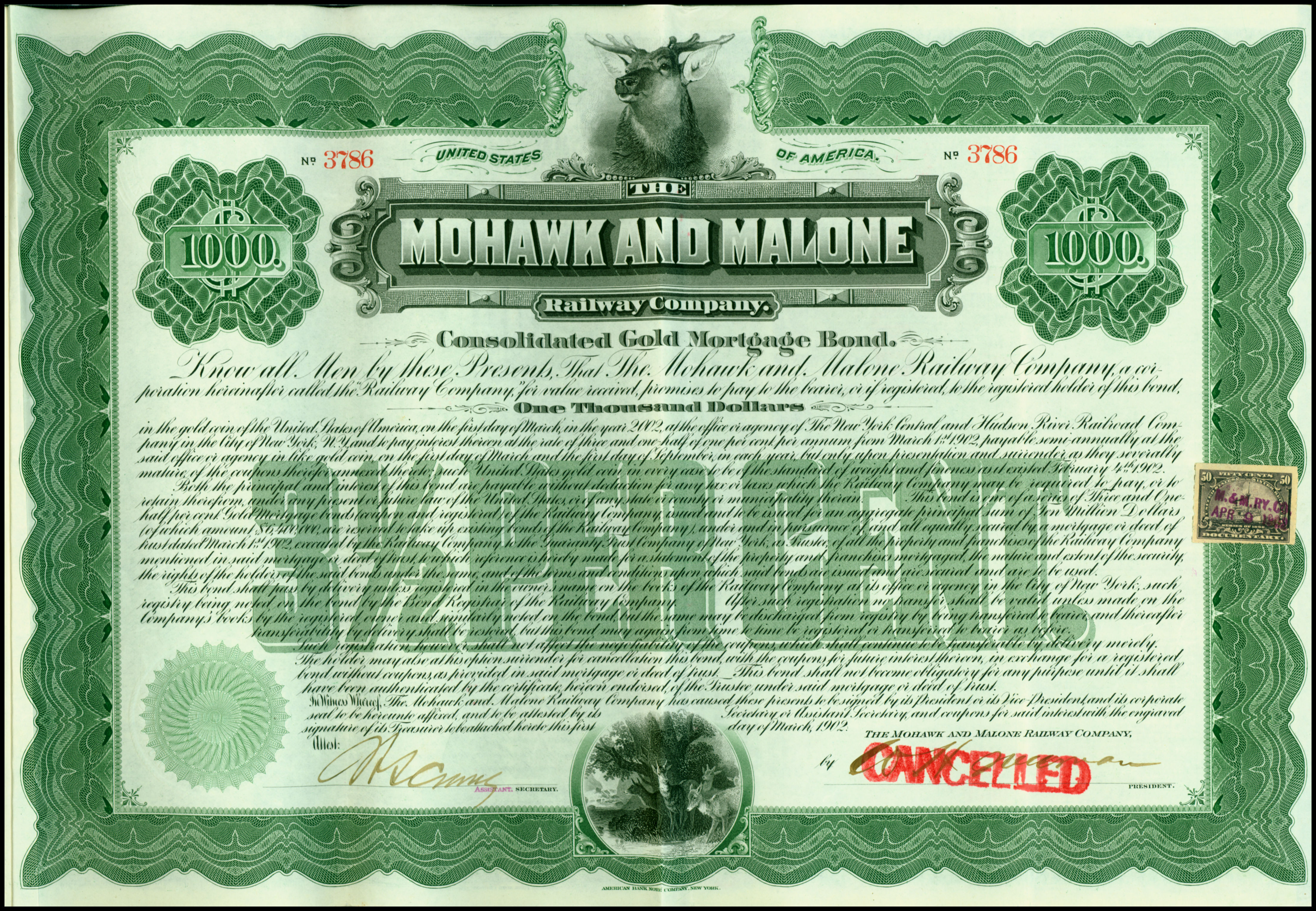
Gold bond of the Mohawk and Malone Railway Company, issued 1. March 1902

The Mohawk and Malone Railway was a railroad that ran from the New York Central Railroad's main line at Herkimer north to Malone, crossing the northern Adirondacks at Tupper Lake Junction, just north of Tupper Lake. The road's founder, Dr. William Seward Webb, was president of the Wagner Palace Car Company and a Vanderbilt in-law. He began by purchasing the 3 ft (914 mm) narrow gauge Herkimer, Newport and Poland Railway, which ran 16 miles (26 km) from Herkimer to Poland, converting its trackage to 4 ft 8 1/2 in (1,435 mm) standard gauge, and straightening it to avoid multiple crossings of the West Canada Creek. He then had track built from Tupper Lake to Moira and thence to Malone. A separate company, the St. Lawrence and Adirondack Railway (also controlled by Webb), completed the line to Montreal, Quebec.

The Mohawk and Malone opened in 1892 from Malone Junction to Childwold Station with a branch from Lake Clear Junction to Saranac Lake. The line was sometimes erroneously called the Adirondack and St. Lawrence Railroad (even though a separate company with this name also operated in this time). After 1893, it was controlled by the New York Central and Hudson River Railroad.

In 1913, it merged with the New York Central and Hudson River Railroad as the "Adirondack Division" of the New York Central.

== Use for regional New York Central passenger train service in the 20th century ==
Through the first half of the 20th century, the New York Central ran day and night trains on the route for service from Utica to Montreal via Lake Clear Junction and Malone. In the post-World War II period, the NYC's North Star train, and later, the Iroquois, provided direct sleeping car service from New York City's Grand Central Terminal to Lake Placid. In 1953, the NYC terminated service north of Malone toward Montreal. In mid-1957, the company cut mainline service back from Malone to Lake Clear Junction, with all service terminating on the Lake Placid branch that left the division's main route at Lake Clear Junction. On April 24, 1965, the NYC ran its final train on the route.

In the 1990s, service on the southern segment of the route between Utica and Thendara would return with tourist excursions run by the Adirondack Scenic Railroad. In the mid-2010s, the State of New York attempted to convert most of the Utica-Lake Placid segment to a rail trail. However, the Adirondack Railroad successfully won an effort in court to resist rail removal. The New York State Supreme Court ultimately sided with the railroad on September 26, 2017, annulling the rail trail plan in its entirety. In 2020, pro-trail advocates persuaded the New York State Legislature to amend the Adirondack Park Act to allow removal of former NYC tracks from Tupper Lake to Lake Placid (34 miles) and to build a new rail-trail there instead, thus negating the prior Court decisions. Track removal occurred between October, 2020 and November, 2021, with trail completion planned in 2024. New York State has completed renovation of the long-decayed tracks from Big Moose to Tupper Lake, and the Adirondack Railroad plans to expand passenger service from Utica beyond Thendara and Big Moose to Tupper Lake (108 miles) in Spring, 2023.

=== Stations ===
Stations served in final years of passenger service, 1957 to 1965

- Lake Placid station
- Ray Brook
- Saranac Lake Union Depot
- Lake Clear Junction
- Tupper Lake
- Childwold (service eliminated between 1959 and 1960)
- Sabattis
- Big Moose
- Thendara station (noted on NYC timetables as near Old Forge, a resort village, 1.9 miles to the northeast)
- Remsen station (service eliminated between 1959 and 1960)
- Utica Union Station

== See also ==
- Adirondack Scenic Railroad
- New York Central Railroad Adirondack Division Historic District
