= Genesee Valley Transportation Company =

Overview
- Headquarters: Batavia, New York
- Locale: New York and Pennsylvania
- Dates of operation: 1985–Present

Technical
- Track gauge: 4 ft 8 1/2 in (1,435 mm) standard gauge

Other
- Website: Genesee Valley Transportation Co., Inc.

The Genesee Valley Transportation Company (GVT Rail), based in Batavia, New York, is a holding company for several short-line railroads located in New York and Pennsylvania. Founded by Jeffrey Baxter, Charles Riedmiller, John Herbrand, Michael Thomas and David Monte Verde, GVT Rail has grown from a five-mile switching operation in Buffalo, New York, to a system network of greater than 300 miles.

== Subsidiaries ==
- Delaware-Lackawanna Railroad (1993)
- Depew, Lancaster and Western Railroad (1989)
- Falls Road Railroad (1996)
- Genesee and Mohawk Valley Railroad (1992), leased to DL&W and MA&N
- Mohawk, Adirondack and Northern Railroad (1991)
