= Adirondack Railroad =

Tourist railway in upstate New York

Coordinates: 44.35342°N 74.28885°W

Adirondack Scenic Railroad
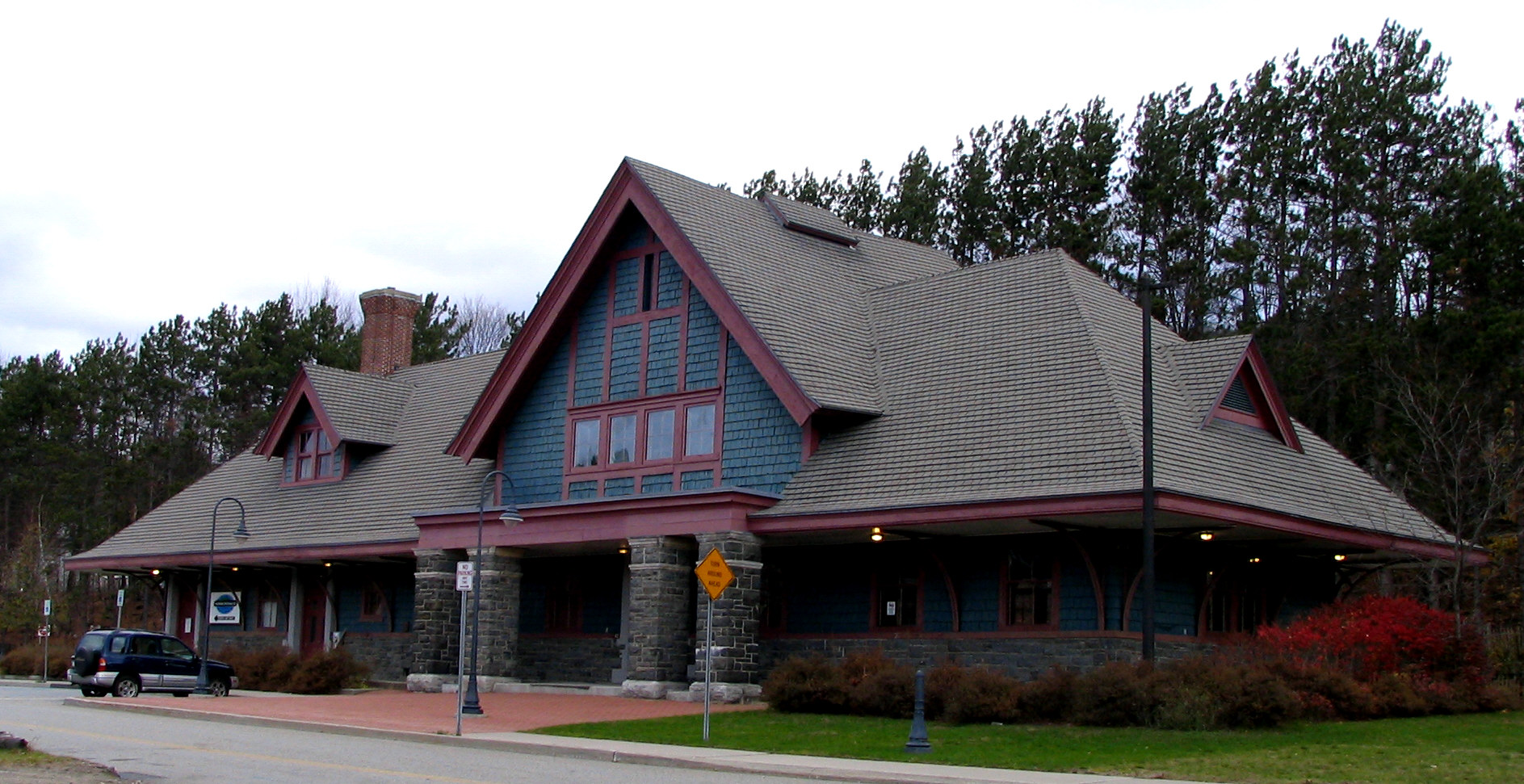
- Saranac Lake station
- Locale: New York

Commercial operations
- Built by: Mohawk and Malone Railway
- Original gauge: 4 ft 8 1/2 in (1,435 mm) standard gauge

Preserved operations
- Reporting mark: ADIX
- Preserved gauge: 4 ft 8 1/2 in (1,435 mm) standard gauge

Commercial history
- 1913: New York Central takes over
- Closed: 1980
- Preserved era: 1992 -

Preservation history
- 1992: Restoration starts
- Headquarters: Utica, NY

Website
- adirondackrr.com

The Adirondack Railroad (formerly the Adirondack Scenic Railroad) (reporting mark ADIX) is a heritage railway serving the Adirondack Park that operates over former New York Central Railroad trackage between Utica and Tupper Lake. The railroad is operated by the not-for-profit Adirondack Railroad Preservation Society, with train crews composed largely of volunteers.

ADIX operates between Utica and Remsen over trackage of the Mohawk, Adirondack and Northern Railroad, part of the Genesee Valley Transportation Company. The Remsen–Tupper Lake segment is owned by the State of New York and is designated as a multi-use corridor for rail traffic during the spring, summer, and fall seasons, and as a snowmobile trail during the winter months.

As of 2021, passenger trains operated between Utica and Thendara, with several trains continuing north to Big Moose. Historic stations have been restored in Holland Patent, Remsen, Saranac Lake and Lake Placid. The section of track between Utica and Lyons Falls is used for freight traffic operated by the Mohawk, Adirondack and Northern Railroad (MA&N).

== History ==
The line was built in 1892 by William Seward Webb, a Vanderbilt in-law, as the Mohawk & Malone Railway and was purchased from him in 1893 by the New York Central and Hudson River Railroad. Its successor from 1913, the New York Central Railroad, ran passenger trains on the route until April 24, 1965. It passed to the Penn Central Transportation Company on February 1, 1968, which abandoned freight operations north of Remsen in 1972. New York State bought the entire Utica-Lake Placid line from the bankrupt Penn Central in 1974, primarily to serve the 1980 Winter Olympics in Lake Placid. The Adirondack Railway then operated passenger services between Utica and Lake Placid from 1979 to 1981. Tracks were dormant from 1981 until 1992, when restoration began with a 4-mile (6.4 km) section from Thendara to Minnehaha, New York. The section was approved and demonstrated on July 4, 1992, and the line was given the name Adirondack Centennial Railroad. It was renamed Adirondack Scenic Railroad in 1994.

The railroad had formerly planned to restore passenger operations over the entire 142-mile (229 km) length of the Utica–Lake Placid corridor, and did operate from 2000 to 2016 on the 8-mile (13 km) segment between Saranac Lake and Lake Placid. Other advocates in the area called for replacing the Tupper Lake–Lake Placid section with a rail trail instead. Tracks were slated to be dismantled in late 2016, but their removal was delayed by legal battles between the railroad advocates, rail trail advocates, and the state. The New York Supreme Court ultimately sided with the railroad on September 26, 2017, annulling the rail trail plan. However, in the subsequent Adirondack Park Act, the term "travel corridor" was redefined to include a trail in place of a rail line, reviving the option of a rail trail. The tracks on the 34-mile (55 km) Tupper Lake-Lake Placid section were removed in 2020, and the Adirondack Rail Trail was opened in October 2025.

Concurrently, New York State renovated the tracks from Big Moose to Tupper Lake. The first train ran over the entire 108-mile (174 km) Utica–Tupper Lake corridor in September 2022, and regular scheduled tourist excursion service began in late spring, 2023. The name was changed again to the Adirondack Railroad in 2020.

In September 2026, the Metro-North Railroad donated locomotive 221, a GE P32AC-DM, to the Adirondack Railroad. The addition of an HEP-equipped locomotive would allow them to operate it alongside their MBB-built coaches.

== Gallery ==
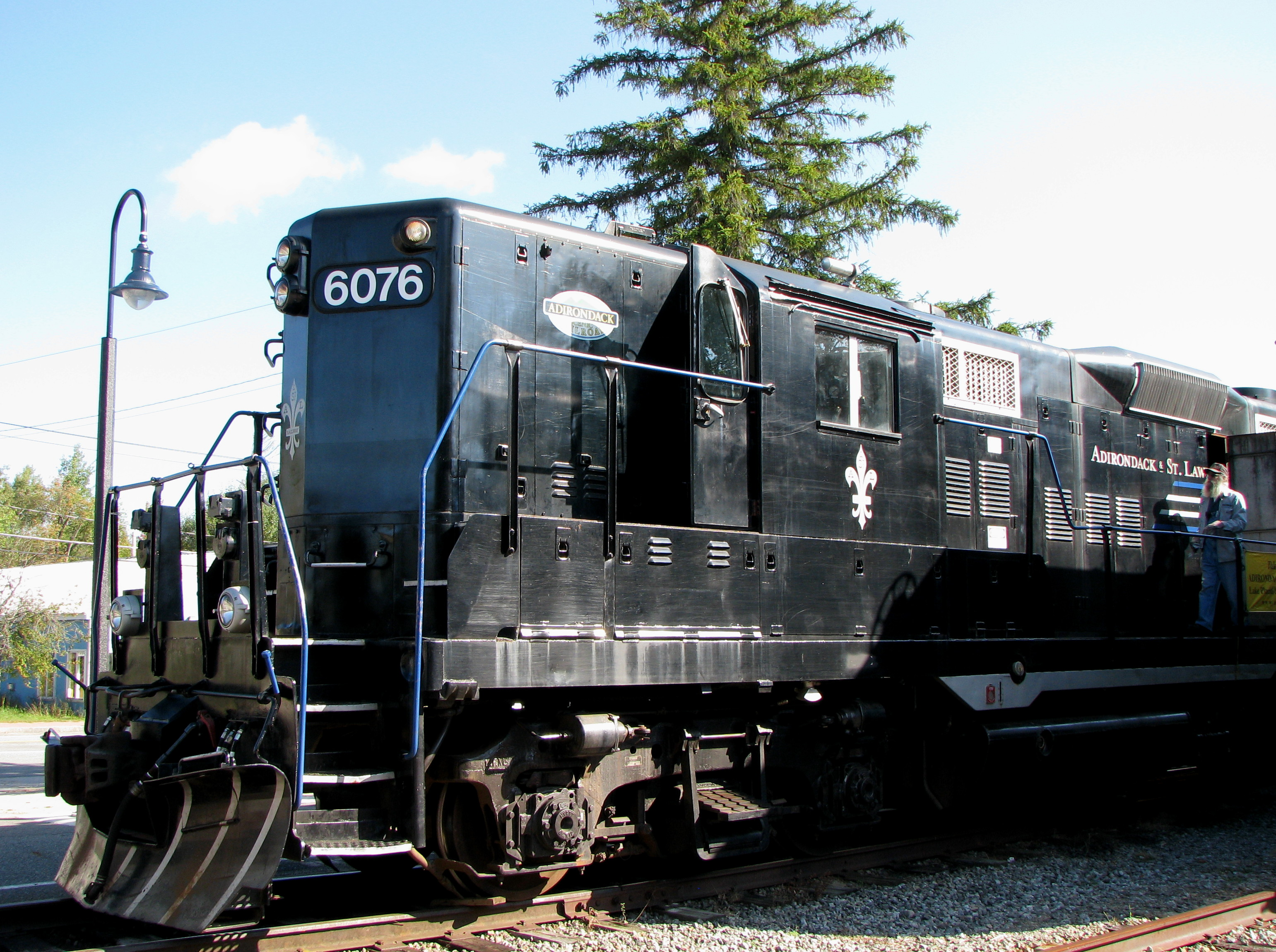
ASR No. 6076

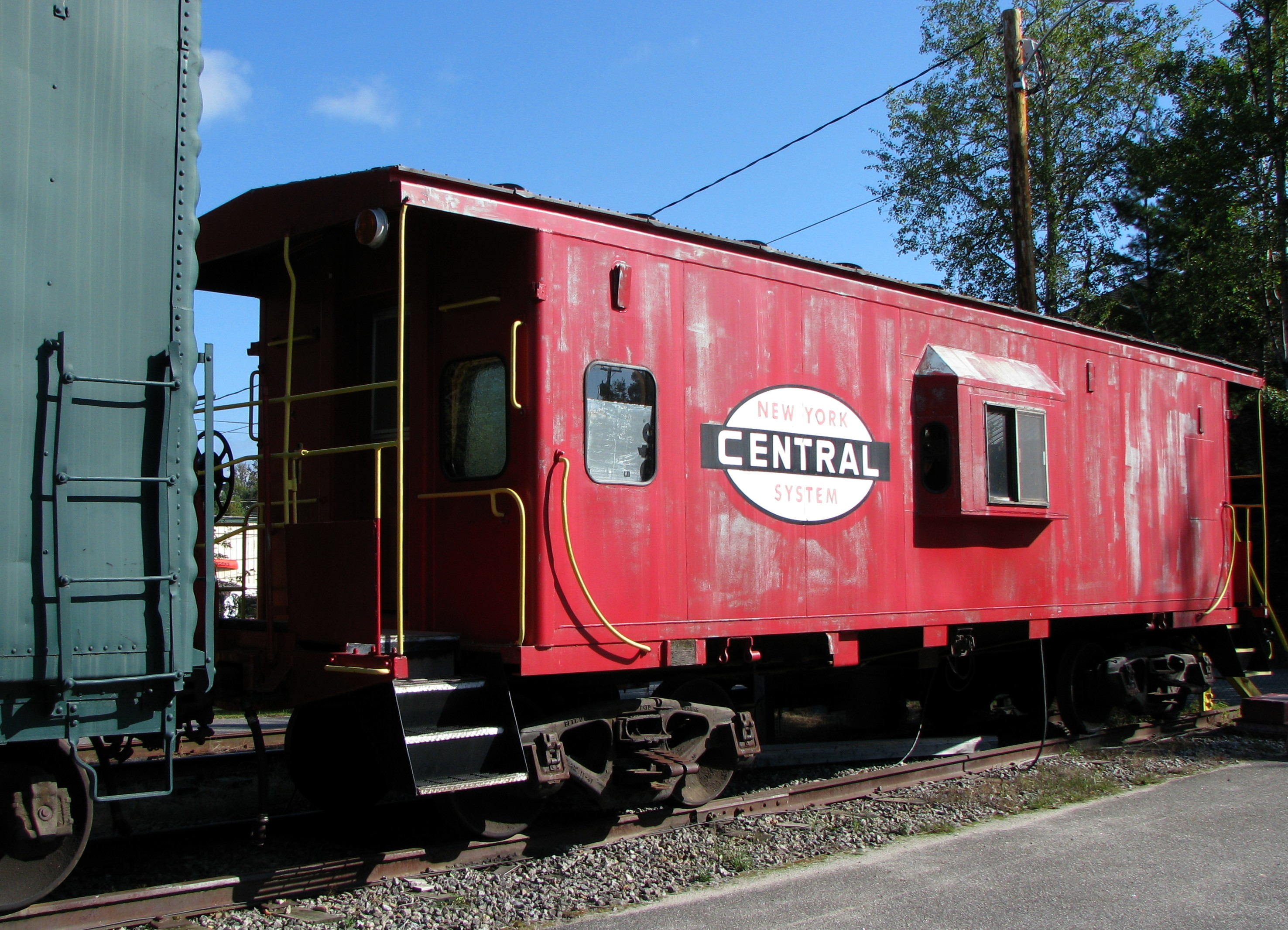
NYC caboose, Now in Utica, NY

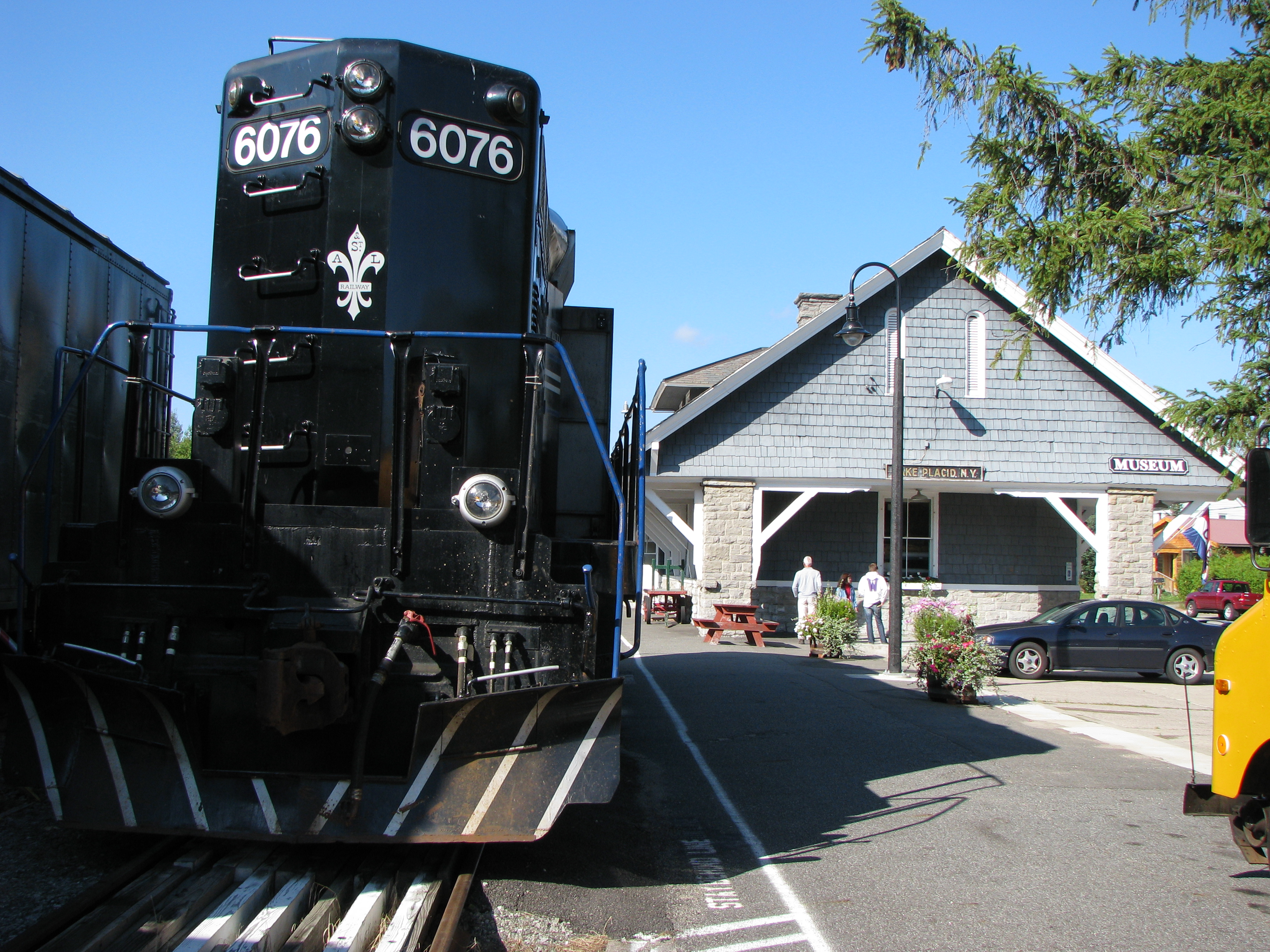
ASR No. 6076, Lake Placid

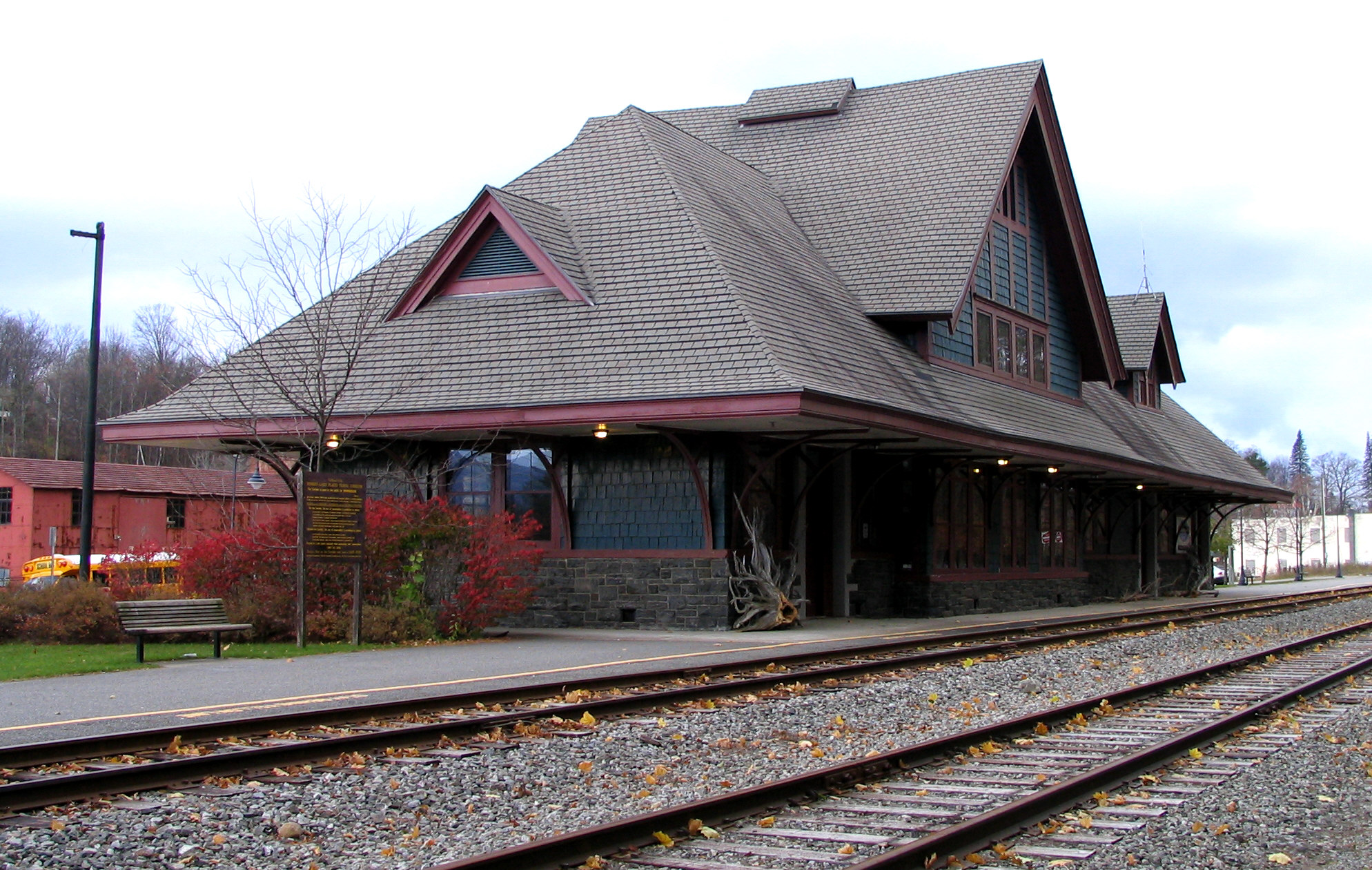
Saranac Lake Union Depot

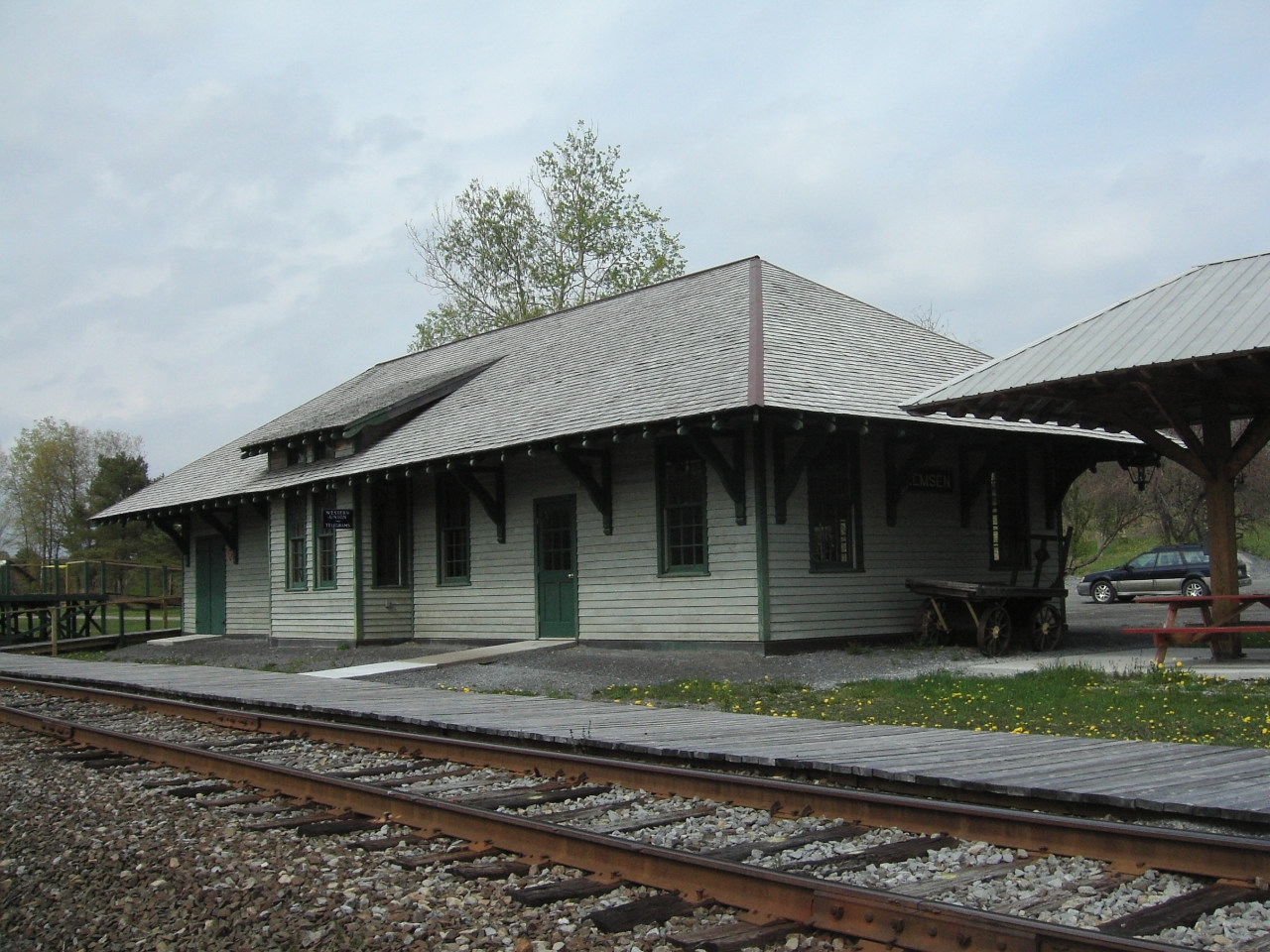
Remsen Depot. Rebuilt in 1999, on the same site and to the same plans as the original station.

== See also ==
- List of heritage railways
- New York Central Railroad Adirondack Division Historic District
