= Holland Patent, New York =

- Village
- Location in Oneida County and the state of New York
- Coordinates: 43°14′31″N 75°15′25″W
- Country: United States
- State: New York
- County: Oneida

Government
  - Mayor: Thomas C. Furlong
  - Deputy Mayor: A. Scott Rosenburgh

Area
  - Total: 0.51 sq mi (1.32 km^{2})
  - Land: 0.51 sq mi (1.31 km^{2})
  - Water: 0.0039 sq mi (0.01 km^{2})
- Elevation: 640 ft (195 m)

Population (2020)
  - Total: 416
  - Density: 822.9/sq mi (317.72/km^{2})
- Time zone: UTC-5 (Eastern (EST))
  - Summer (DST): UTC-4 (EDT)
- ZIP code: 13354
- Area code: 315
- FIPS code: 36-35144
- GNIS feature ID: 0952992
- Website: Village website

Holland Patent is a village in Oneida County, New York, United States. The population was 416 at the 2020 census. The village is named after a land grant, and is in the western part of the town Trenton at the junction of routes 274, 291, and 365.

== History ==
In 1797, the village of Holland Patent was established by Gerrit Boon, an agent of the Holland Land Company to help develop and sell land that had been purchased as investments.

The Holland Patent Stone Churches Historic District was listed on the National Register of Historic Places in 1991. The Holland Patent Railroad Station was listed in 2000.

== Geography ==
Holland Patent is located at 43°14′31″N 75°15′25″W (43.241819, -75.257057).

According to the United States Census Bureau, the village has a total area of 0.5 square miles (1.3 km^{2}), of which 0.5 square miles (1.3 km^{2}) is land and 2.04% is water.

== Demographics ==
Historical population
Census	Pop.	Note	%±
1870	320		—
1880	401		25.3%
1890	406		1.2%
1900	352		−13.3%
1910	337		−4.3%
1920	328		−2.7%
1930	337		2.7%
1940	388		15.1%
1950	400		3.1%
1960	538		34.5%
1970	556		3.3%
1980	534		−4.0%
1990	411		−23.0%
2000	461		12.2%
2010	458		−0.7%
2020	416		−9.2%
U.S. Decennial Census

As of the census of 2000, there were 461 people, 201 households, and 129 families residing in the village. The population density was 958.8 inhabitants per square mile (370.2/km^{2}). There were 227 housing units at an average density of 472.1 per square mile (182.3/km^{2}). The racial makeup of the village was 98.48% White, 0.22% Asian, 0.22% from other races, and 1.08% from two or more races. Hispanic or Latino people of any race were 0.65% of the population.

There were 201 households, out of which 31.8% had children under the age of 18 living with them, 49.8% were married couples living together, 10.9% had a female householder with no male present, and 35.8% were non-families. 31.3% of all households were made up of individuals, and 9.5% had someone living alone who was 65 years of age or older. The average household size was 2.29 and the average family size was 2.91.

In the village, the population was spread out, with 23.6% under the age of 18, 9.3% from 18 to 24, 27.5% from 25 to 44, 24.3% from 45 to 64, and 15.2% who were 65 years of age or older. The median age was 39 years. For every 100 females, there were 104.9 males. For every 100 females age 18 and over, there were 93.4 males.

The median income for a household in the village was $42,167, and the median income for a family was $51,667. Males had a median income of $30,000 versus $27,917 for females. The per capita income for the village was $21,864. About 3.2% of families and 4.1% of the population were below the poverty line, including 2.6% of those under age 18 and 3.8% of those age 65 or over.

== Education ==
It is in the Holland Patent Central School District.

== Notable person ==
First Lady Rose Cleveland grew up in Holland Patent.

== See also ==
- Holland Patent Railroad Station
