= North Star (NYC train) =

American-Canadian named passenger train (1947–1962)

Overview
- Service type: Inter-city rail
- Status: Discontinued
- Locale: Northeastern United States; Midwestern United States; Ontario, Canada
- First service: 1947
- Last service: 1962
- Former operator: New York Central Railroad

Route
- Termini: New York, New York; Cleveland, Toronto, Ontario, Lake Placid, New York
- Service frequency: Daily
- Train number: 21

On-board services
- Seating arrangements: Coaches
- Sleeping arrangements: to Toronto: Lounge Sleeping Car (Sections and Buffet), Roomettes, Double Bedrooms; to Cleveland: Roomettes and Double Bedrooms; to Montreal and Plattsburg on D&H line; to Lake Placid: up to six sleepers on Fridays, accommodations including Roomettes, Sections, Double Bedrooms, Drawing Rooms and Compartments; to Malone (Fridays only): Sections, Drawing Room, Compartments; to Thendara (Fridays only): Sections, Drawing Rooms, Compartment (summer, 1951)

The North Star was a named night train which operated between New York City, Cleveland, Toronto, and Lake Placid, from 1947 to 1962. It was distinctive in the history of the New York Central's history of service to New York's North Country, because it was the longest-lasting train in the Central's later decades that hosted sleeping cars that went continuously from New York City to Lake Placid in the Adirondacks. Predecessor trains in the pre-World War II period carrying direct sleeping cars to the Adirondacks included the Niagara (#29) and the Ontarian (#21 in 1941).

== History ==
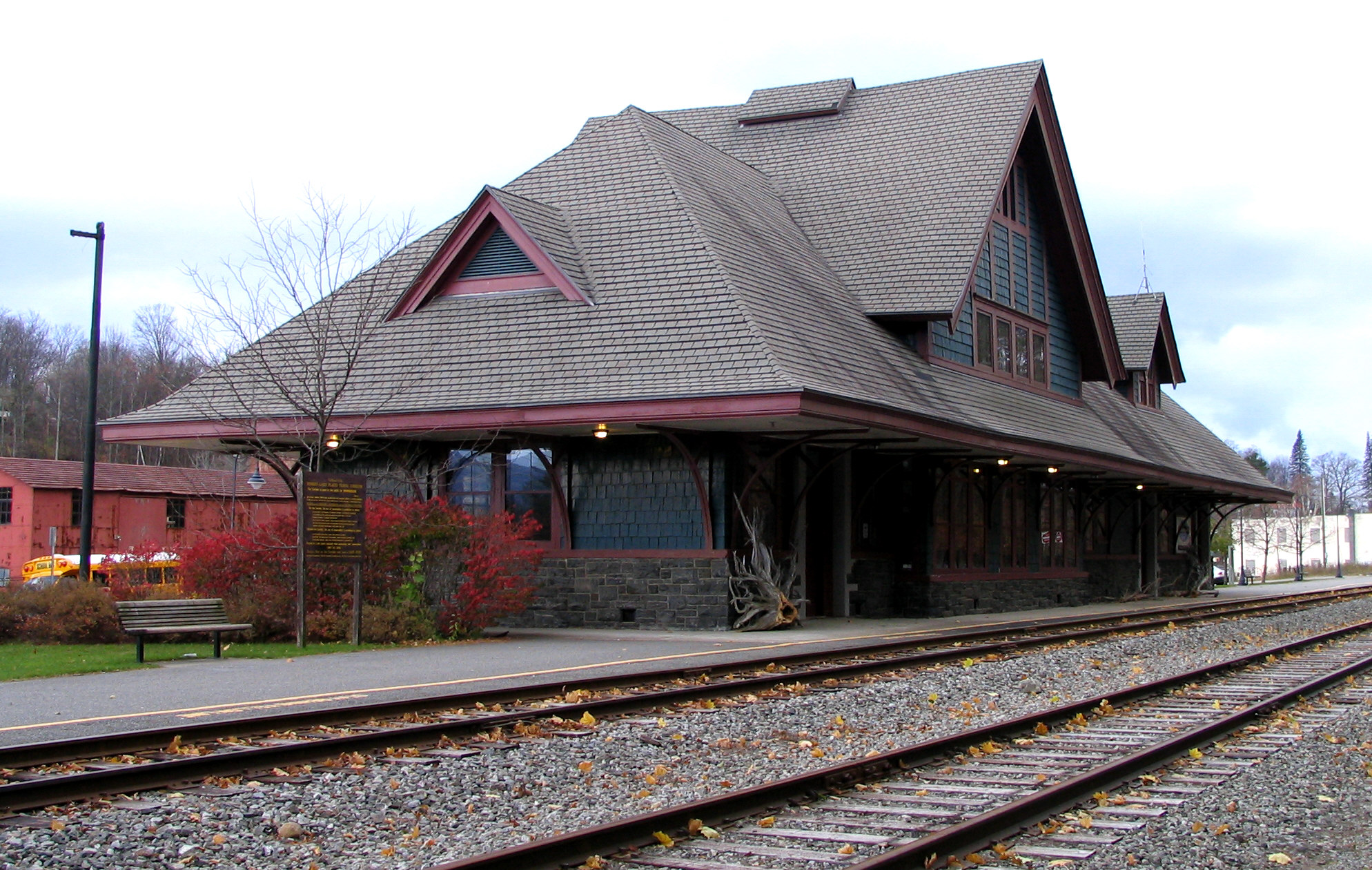
Saranac Lake Union Depot, the third to last station on the Lake Placid branch of the route

The North Star carried the train number 21, heading north from Grand Central Terminal. For most years of its service, the returning Lake Placid-to-New York City sleeper service would join the south-bound New York Special (#44) at Utica.

In its debut season in April 1947, it featured coaches that went daily from New York City separately to Cleveland, Toronto and Lake Placid, in addition to sleeper cars that went to each of these destinations. The train's cars to Cleveland and Toronto would split off at Buffalo Central Terminal, and the cars to Lake Placid would split off at Utica Union Station. In subsequent years, the main portion of the train would alternatively terminate at Cleveland or Buffalo, while the sleeper service continued to the three cities. Coach passengers would need to change to a connecting Adirondack Division train in Utica. At Albany Union Station, sleeper units would join the Delaware and Hudson Railway's unnamed #7 (a local train that left earlier in the evening than the D&H's Montreal Limited) on the D&H's line along the eastern edge of the Adirondacks to Plattsburg and Montreal.

In the train's summer seasons in its early years, a high proportion of the sleeping cars were Lake Placid-bound. In addition to Lake Placid-bound sleepers, the sleeper destinations included Malone, a destination further north in the North Country, along the NYC's traditional route towards Montreal. By April 1953, the NYC dropped the direct New York-to-Lake Placid coach service from the different coach destinations of the North Star.

=== Demise ===
By 1956, the train was cut to a single Saturday night departure. The Cleveland Limited (#57) handled the west and north-bound sleeper trains on the Adirondack route on other nights.

Beginning in 1959, the NYC would continue the tradition of sleeper service to Lake Placid on its Iroquois train (#35). The North Star would have its last appearance as a named train in summer, 1962; however, it continued briefly as unnamed #21.

The Iroquois continued direct sleeper service to Lake Placid to at least the fall 1964 timetable. The NYC ran its final passenger train on the Adirondack Division route on April 24, 1965.
