= New York Central Railroad Adirondack Division Historic District =

Historic district in New York, United States

- U.S. National Register of Historic Places
- U.S. Historic district
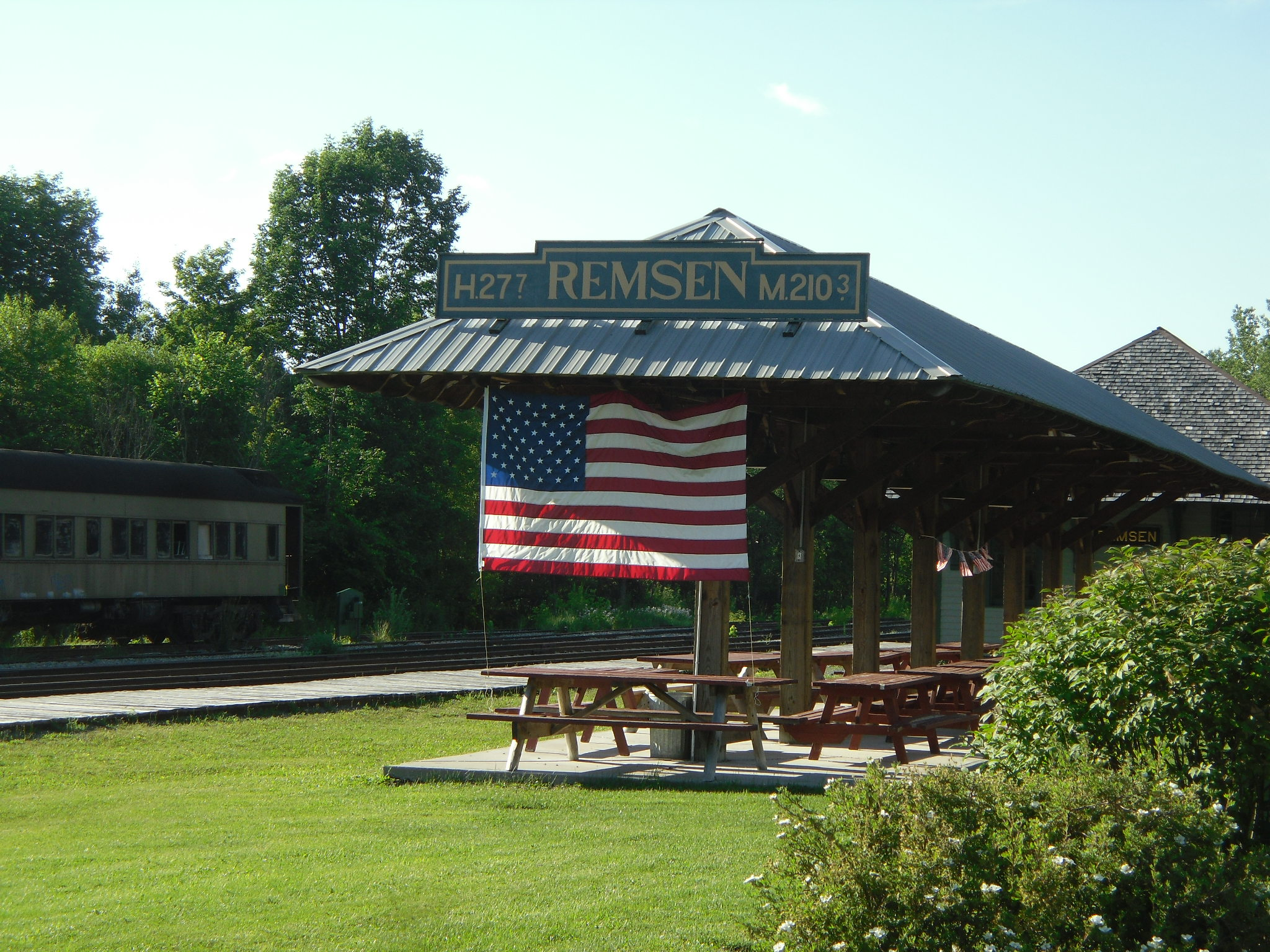
- Remsen NY Depot, July 2010

- Location within New York Location within the United States
- Nearest city: Lake Placid, New York, Remsen, New York, and Horseshoe, New York
- Coordinates: 43°53′40″N 74°26′26″W
- Area: 1,144 acres (463 ha)
- Architect: Roberts, W.N.; Roberts, Hershel
- NRHP reference No.: 93001451
- Added to NRHP: December 23, 1993

New York Central Railroad Adirondack Division Historic District is a national historic district located in Essex, Franklin, Hamilton, Herkimer, Oneida, and St. Lawrence County, New York. The district includes 23 contributing buildings and 18 contributing structures. It encompasses the former Mohawk and Malone Railway that eventually became the Adirondack Division of the New York Central Railroad in 1913.

It was listed on the National Register of Historic Places in 1993.
