= Syracuse station (Delaware, Lackawanna and Western Railroad) =

Coordinates: 43.04636°N 76.15478°W

Syracuse
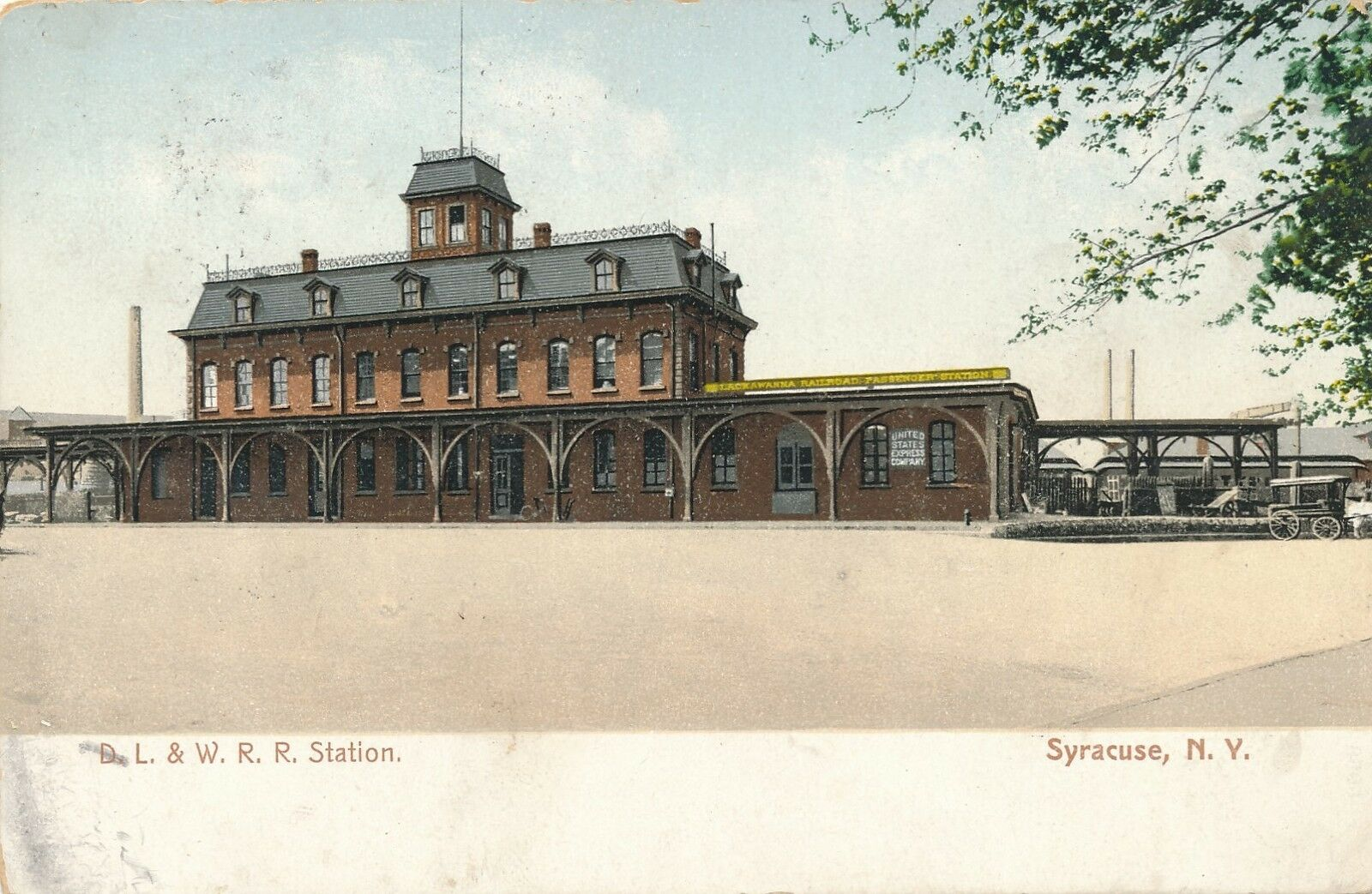
- An early postcard of the second DL&W Depot circa 1901-1907 before being replaced by the current structure

General information
- Location: 225 West Jefferson Street, Syracuse, New York 13202
- Line: Delaware, Lackawanna and Western Railroad
- Platforms: 1 island platform
- Tracks: 2

Construction
- Architectural style: Streamline Moderne

History
- Opened: 1877
- Closed: 1958
- Rebuilt: 1941

Former services
Preceding station	Delaware, Lackawanna and Western Railroad	Following station
Baldwinsville toward Oswego	Oswego Branch	Homer toward Binghamton
Location

Syracuse station was the Delaware, Lackawanna and Western's railroad station in Syracuse, New York. It was housed in different buildings in succession. It hosted trains going north to Oswego, New York on the Lake Ontario coast by way of the DLW's acquisition, the former Oswego and Syracuse Railroad; and it also hosted trains going south to Binghamton on the route of the former Syracuse and Binghamton Railroad, and further (via connection) to Hoboken, New Jersey.

== History ==
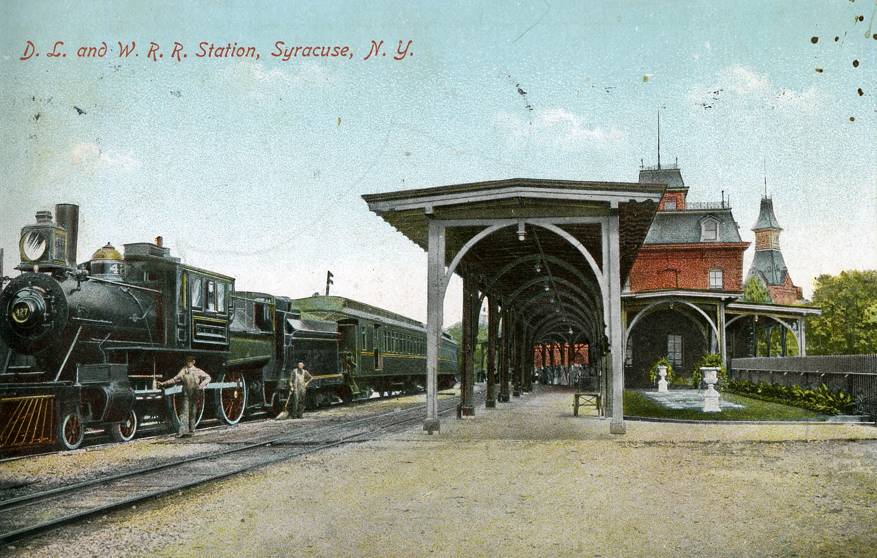
A DL&W train at the 1877 station, ca. 1910

The first station was located at Onondaga and Clinton Streets. The second station (225 West Jefferson Street in the Armory Square neighborhood) was built in 1877 and was used to 1940. During that earlier period trains ran on the street level through Syracuse. Per new city regulations, the DLW's tracks were raised to become elevated by 1940.

The third building, 500 South Clinton Street, also in Armory Square. Designed in the Streamline Moderne style, it was built in 1940-1941 and was used until 1958. It was designed by local architect Frederick B. O'Connor, and was "completely fireproof," and has a granite base, and the remaining exterior was built of buff brick and limestone. Until the mid-1940s, the station was staffed by both freight and passenger agents. The station for the New York Central Railroad, passing east–west through Syracuse, was about one mile away. By 1946, passenger train traffic to and from the south would decrease to two trains in each direction: a night train, the Interstate Express to Philadelphia and a day train to Hoboken. (Continuing south, the Interstate Express made a connection in Binghamton with the New York Mail for traveling to Hoboken.) Additionally, by 1949, trains north to Oswego had been discontinued.

In 1958, the DLW discontinued passenger trains to Syracuse, and the station became used as a bus station. An extension to the building was added in approximately 1961. The station site was reused again as a passenger station for the short-lived OnTrack commuter service starting in 1994 as Armory Square - Downtown Syracuse station, which came to life from a proposal to use the former DL&W track. However OnTrack was short-lived, and the station was closed again in 2008. As of 2022, the building has been used for several decades as an architectural firm's offices.

== See also ==
- Railroads in Syracuse, New York
- Syracuse station (New York Central Railroad)
- Syracuse station (Amtrak)
