= OnTrack =

Commuter rail line of Syracuse, New York (1994–2008)

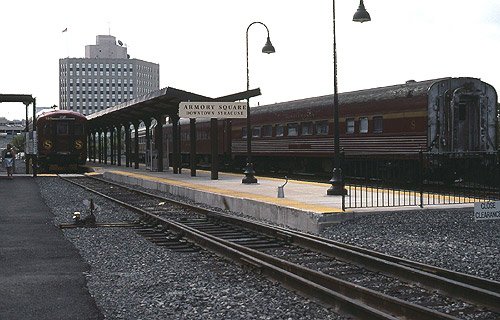
- OnTrack trains at Armory Square in July 1995

Overview
- Locale: Syracuse, New York
- Transit type: Suburban rail
- Number of lines: 1
- Number of stations: 3 (full time); 2 (flag stops); 3 (seasonal); 3 (proposed but never opened)

Operation
- Began operation: October 1994
- Ended operation: March 2008
- Operator: New York, Susquehanna and Western Railway
- Number of vehicles: 4

Technical
- Track gauge: 1,435 mm (4 ft 8 1/2 in)

OnTrack was a suburban rail line that operated in Syracuse, New York, from 1994 to 2008. The line ran from the Carousel Center (today's Destiny USA) on the city's north side via Armory Square and Syracuse University to Colvin Street, with summer weekend service south to Jamesville, mainly using 1950s-era diesel railcars.

The line was the result of a public-private partnership between the state of New York, Onondaga County and the New York, Susquehanna and Western Railway (NYSW), a Class II regional freight carrier. The NYSW received tax breaks and grants in exchange for operating passenger service on the Syracuse line. Although OnTrack was initially successful, ridership declined and was ultimately discontinued due to inadequate rush hour service, poor publicity and failure to connect to Syracuse's Amtrak and intercity bus routes.

In recent years, there have been proposals to complete the line and restart passenger service, potentially as a light rail system.

== History ==
Starting in the late 19th century, an extensive series of electric interurban railways served the Syracuse region, but by the 1930s local rail service ceased, and was replaced by buses and automobiles. In the 1990s, Syracuse University graduate Robert Colucci proposed converting for passenger service a roughly 10-mile (16 km) segment of the former Delaware, Lackawanna and Western Railroad Syracuse–Binghamton mainline between Syracuse University, Carousel Center (now Destiny USA), and Armory Square in the north, and Jamesville in the south. At the time, the little-used right of way was owned by Conrail, which considered it a financial burden, so it was sold for $1 to the Onondaga County Industrial Development Agency (IDA). The Onondaga IDA, in turn, leased the line to the New York, Susquehanna and Western Railway (NYSW) at a bargain rate, and allowed the railway to use it for freight service on the condition that a passenger rail service be run at least 250 days per year with 1,250 round trips. In addition, the NYSW received a $400,000 tax break from the state of New York to cover operating costs.

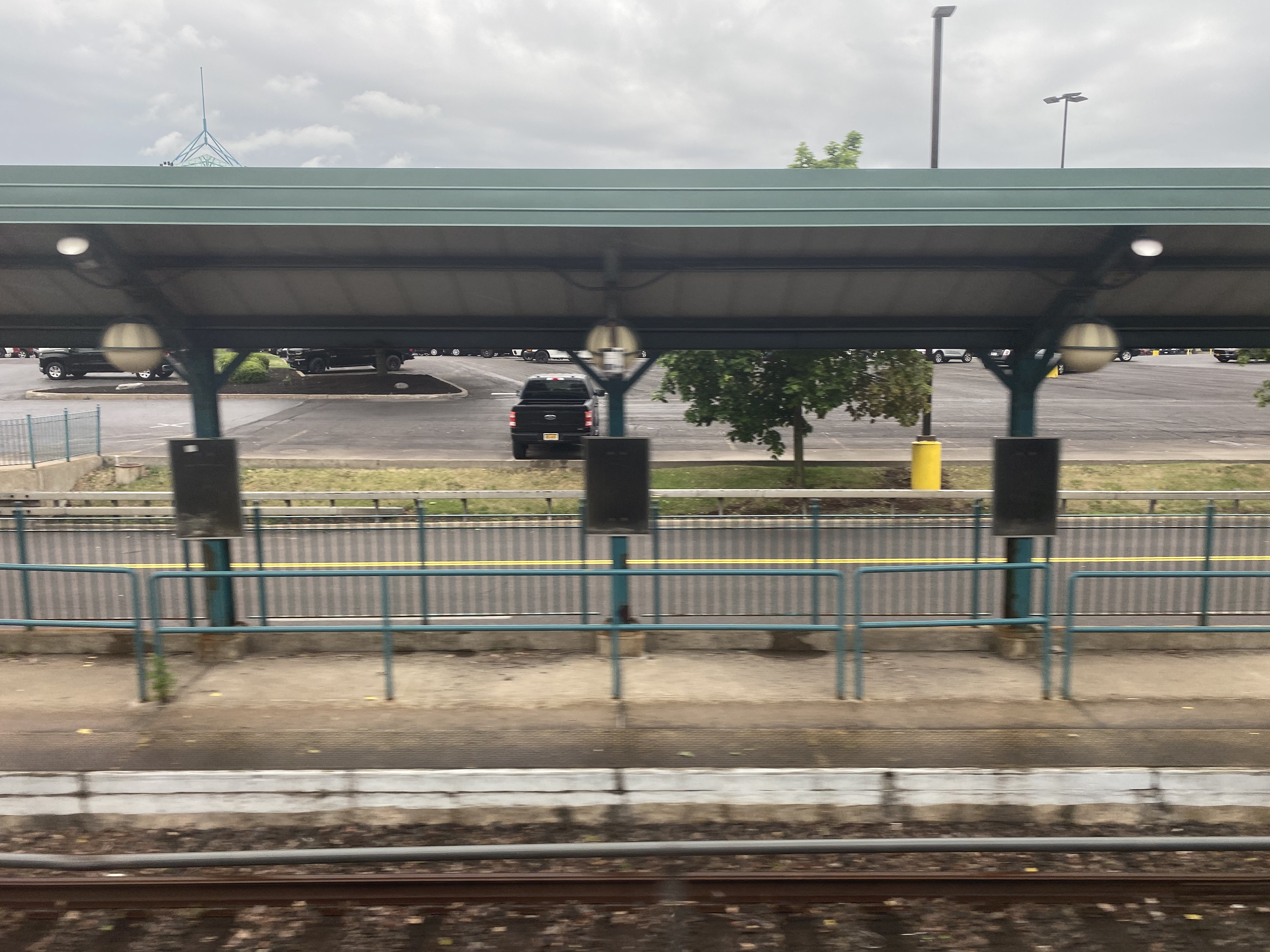
The disused Carousel Center (Destiny USA) station in 2021

Since the rail infrastructure was already in place, the state of New York provided a $4.5 million grant to purchase rolling stock (four Ex-New Haven Budd Rail Diesel Cars) and construct passenger stations along the former freight line. The NYSW also hosted their own fundraising excursion behind steam locomotive No. 142 in May 1993 for a $1.2 million track rehabilitation, which would boost the line's speed restriction. OnTrack was incorporated on September 24, 1994 and the primary service (known as the City Express) began in October between Syracuse University and Carousel Center, ten times a day and seven days a week. The NYSW hosted another excursion behind No. 142 to promote OnTrack. OnTrack initially exceeded expectations, carrying 45,757 passengers in its first three months of service. However, the line never turned a profit, and it relied on state subsidies and volunteers to keep it running.

With the initial success of the line, NYSW proposed expansions to the service, including a 2002 proposal for intercity service from Syracuse to Binghamton, stopping at several OnTrack stations as well as Cortland. However, the schedule was not optimized for commuter usage. Rather, the train was meant to shuttle visitors to popular destinations such as downtown museums and restaurants, weekend excursion trips to Jamesville Beach Park, the Santa Train, and the Orange Express special service for Carrier Dome events.

A high priority project was a connection to the William F. Walsh Regional Transportation Center, where it could link directly to Amtrak and local/intercity buses, and the adjacent new Alliance Bank Stadium (now known as NBT Bank Stadium) and CNY Regional Market, which would make the line much more useful for commuters. This would require the construction of a new bridge over Park Street (State Route 370), so that local trains would not interfere with operations on the CSX (former New York Central) main line. Centro, Syracuse's local transportation agency, began construction on the bridge in 1998, and also prepared a platform at the Walsh Transportation Center to allow direct transfer between OnTrack and Amtrak trains. Congressman Jim Walsh approved a $3 million grant for the project. However, CSX objected due to concerns that construction might destabilize the adjacent freight rail bridge across Park Avenue. The bridge project never came to fruition, and more than 300 tons of steel budgeted for construction were scrapped.

By the mid-2000s, ridership had dropped greatly due to the lack of continued publicity and marketing. Services were reduced, which led to further decrease in patronage. By 2003, OnTrack only ran four days per week. The NYSW was also found to have used large amounts of state grants and tax breaks to fund freight service and track repairs on their other routes, rather than for OnTrack as the money had been intended. Another reason for the lack of growth in ridership was the lack of stations in residential areas, limiting the line's use by commuters. In 2007, service had been cut to weekends only and ridership had declined to 50 passengers per day, far short of the 500 per day required to be profitable. That same year, NYSW chairman Walter Rich, one of OnTrack's major proponents, died, and the railway's interest in continuing OnTrack service diminished. Regular service was terminated indefinitely in July 2007. The Orange Express ran its last train in March 2008. The line continues to be used, infrequently, by freight trains.

== Route ==
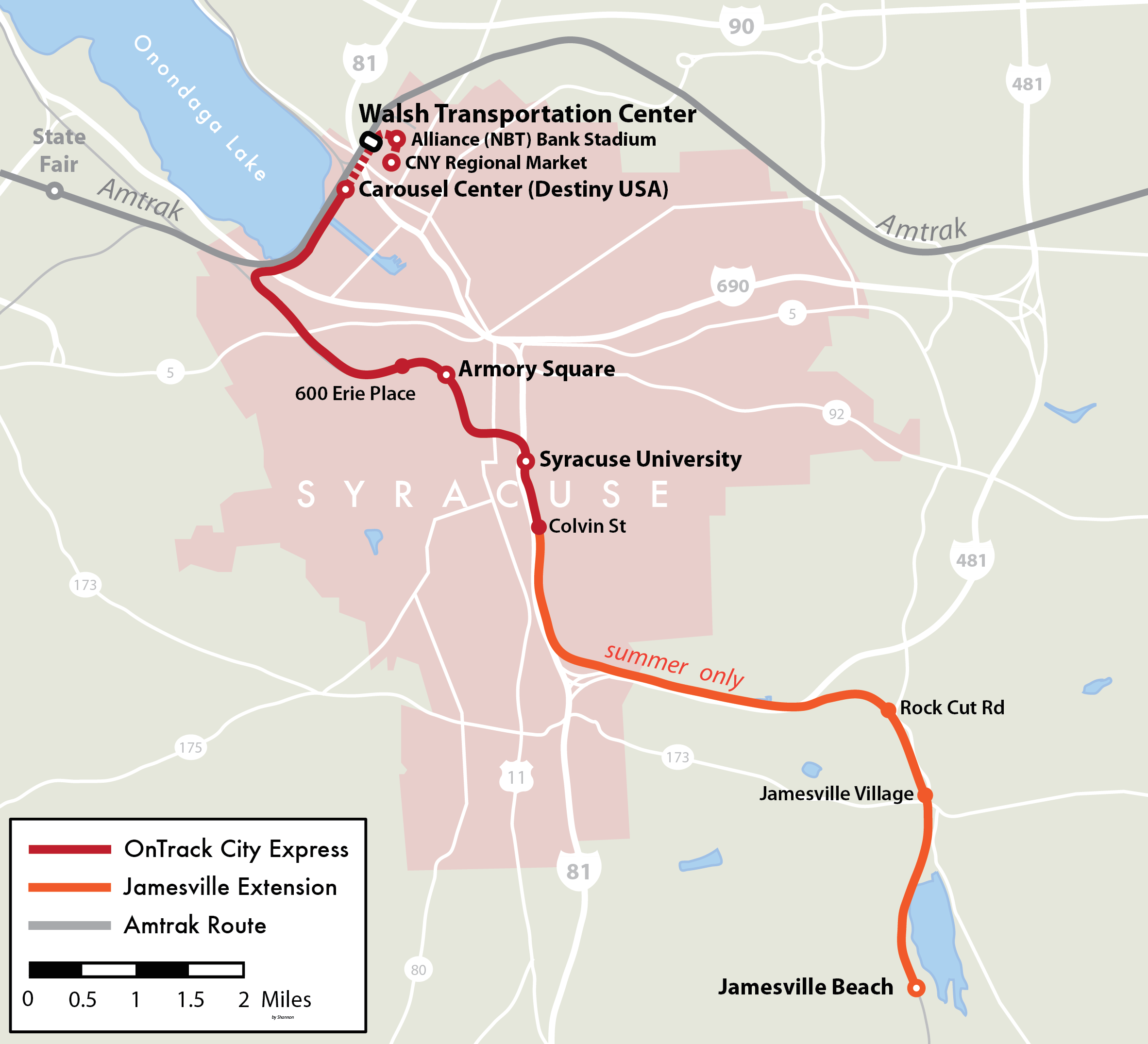
Map of OnTrack service, showing the unfinished extension to Walsh Transportation Center. Amtrak service shown in gray.

The OnTrack route starts at Destiny USA in the north, and runs along the south shore of Onondaga Lake and under I-690 before turning southeast through the Westside neighborhoods of Syracuse, roughly paralleling Erie Boulevard. It passes directly through downtown Syracuse near Armory Square, turning south along Onondaga Creek, then through the Southside and under I-81 where it skirts the west side of the Syracuse University campus and Oakwood Cemetery to Colvin Street. The line then turns east through rolling countryside along I-481, leaving the city of Syracuse, and then south again towards Jamesville and along the western shore of Jamesville Reservoir to Jamesville Beach Park. Within Syracuse, the line passes through a mix of residential, commercial, retail and light industrial areas; south of Brighton Avenue and the city limits it traverses mostly undeveloped rural land.

The entire line north of Jamesville is grade-separated, and in downtown Syracuse most of the line is elevated. The line is single-tracked with passing sidings at Armory Square (old Downtown station) and Jamesville. The section south of Syracuse University was only used by special excursion trains, although in 1999 when parts of Interstate 81 were temporarily closed for construction, the federal government briefly subsidized free commuter service between Jamesville and downtown. Only four of the stations (Carousel Center, Armory Square, Syracuse University and the unfinished station at Alliance Bank Stadium) had covered platforms. The regular fare was $1.50, and the fare for the Orange Express was $4 (from Armory Square) or $5 (from Carousel Center).

=== List of stations ===
Name	Miles (km) from RTC	Type	Description	Photo	Current owners
Central New York Regional Market	n/a	n/a	Regional farmer's market. Planned, but never built.		n/a
Alliance Bank Stadium (NBT Bank Stadium)	0.46 (0.74)	Covered platform	Home of the Syracuse Chiefs minor league baseball team. Built but never opened. Demolished in 2022.	Alliance Bank (now NBT) Stadium Station in 2017	Station demolished, property owned by NBT Bank
William F. Walsh Regional Transportation Center	0.00	Covered platform	Connections to Amtrak, Greyhound, Trailways and local Centro buses. A dedicated, fully covered platform and link to the transportation center was completed, but never connected to the rest of the system.	A section of incomplete track at the William F. Walsh Regional Transportation Center, which had been built for OnTrack trains but never connected to the line	Intermodal Transportation Center, Inc, a subsidiary of Centro
Carousel Center (Destiny USA)	0.59 (0.95)	Covered platform	New York's largest shopping mall.	Destiny USA Ontrack Station in 2018	Pyramid Group, owners of Destiny USA
600 Erie Place	3.30 (5.31)	Flag stop, no platform	For the Westside neighborhood.	600 Erie Place Flag Stop Station in 2016	
Armory Square - Downtown Syracuse	3.84 (6.18)	Covered platform	Elevated station on Armory Square, a major nightlife area with many small shops and restaurants, and close to downtown jobs.	Two trains servicing the armory square station, an express, and an orange	Platform is still owned by NYSW; the building is owned by a private company and was once the DL&W Depot.
Syracuse University - Carrier Dome	5.01 (8.07)	Covered platform	Serving the University Hill neighborhood, about a quarter-mile (0.4 km) from Carrier Dome. Final destination for the Orange Express.	Syracuse University - Carrier Dome station in 2013	NYSW
Colvin Street	5.66 (9.11)	Open platform	For the Brighton and Outer Comstock neighborhoods. City Express trains only served this stop if called.	The stairs to enter the Colvin Street platform. No physical platform is left.	Stairs are owned by the City of Syracuse; platform is owned by NYSW.
Rock Cut Road (seasonal)	9.88 (15.91)	Flag stop, no platform			
Jamesville Village (seasonal)	10.69 (17.21)	Flag stop, no platform			Track owned by NYSW; station that serviced the flag stop is owned by the town.
Jamesville Beach (seasonal)	12.39 (19.95)	Open platform	Popular swimming and boating area along Jamesville Reservoir.		

== Rolling stock ==
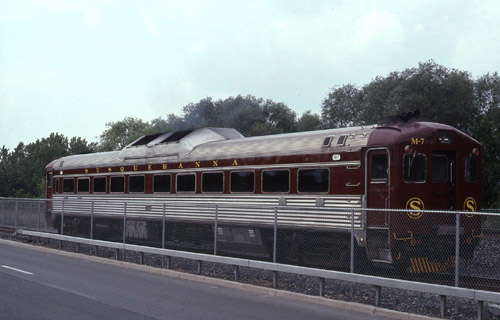
M-7 at Carousel Center in July 1995

OnTrack was operated with four Budd Rail Diesel Cars (RDC-1) "Buddliners" built in the 1950s. All OnTrack cars were owned by the New York, Susquehanna and Western Railway and returned to NYSW upon the demise of the commuter rail service. By 2008, the RDCs were either sold or out of service. The Orange Express required longer trains and used retired Metra passenger cars, pulled by various NYSW locomotives.

- M-5: Budd RDC-1 built for New Haven Railroad (NHRR) #23 built in 1952; later served with Penn Central Transportation Company (PC) as #68; Metro-North Railroad (MNR) as #18, Amtrak as #18; sold to Conway Scenic Railroad of New Hampshire in May 2008.
- M-6: Budd RDC-1 built in 1953 for NHRR as #37; later served with PC (#37); MNR (#11); Amtrak (#11); still owned by NYSWR
- M-7: Budd RDC-1 built in 1953 for NHRR as #43; later served with PC (#43); MNR (#43) and now with Southern Railroad of New Jersey since 2008. This specific car has been sitting abandoned in a lot owned by SRNJ since 2009.
- M-8: Budd RDC-1 built in 1953 for New York Central Railroad as #465; later served with PC (#65) and MNR (#65)

== Closure ==
The rolling stock has been scrapped or sold to other companies. Most stations are sitting abandoned. Many people agree that the only reason that OnTrack was not profitable was due to lack of service hours during rush hour, as well as there being no physical connection between the William J. Walsh Transportation Center and the rest of the line.

Although a connection was planned and was under construction, plans halted soon after construction began, as Conrail claimed that the construction to the bridge was weakening their bridge next to it. The metal to build the bridge was scrapped and sold in 2013, long after the rail lines' demise.

== Future ==
Local authorities have discussed the possibility of renewed OnTrack service, perhaps as a light rail system. Eric Ennis, an economic development specialist for the city of Syracuse, has cited new development in the University Hill neighborhood, a residential boom in downtown, and the expansion of Destiny USA as potential sources of increased ridership. New stations in the low-income neighborhoods the line passes through would increase mobility for carless residents. The Syracuse Regional Airport Authority, which operates Syracuse Hancock International Airport, has also considered the potential benefits of restarting OnTrack service with an extension to the airport.

In June of 2023, the tax break for NYSW ended. Onondaga County sent NYSW a bill of $290,000. There is a pending legal battle about the assessment of the property.

== See also ==
- Railroads in Syracuse, New York
- Syracuse and Binghamton Railroad
- Central New York Regional Transportation Authority

== Works cited ==
- LaBerge, Chris (Dec 2009). "Regional Rail in Syracuse, NY: A Case and Concept for Renewed Service" (PDF). Cornell University. Archived from the original (PDF) on July 30, 2010.
- Duke, Donald; Keilty, Edmund (1990). RDC: The Budd Rail Diesel Car. San Marino, California: Golden West Books. ISBN 978-0-87095-103-9.
