= Syracuse station (New York Central Railroad) =

Syracuse
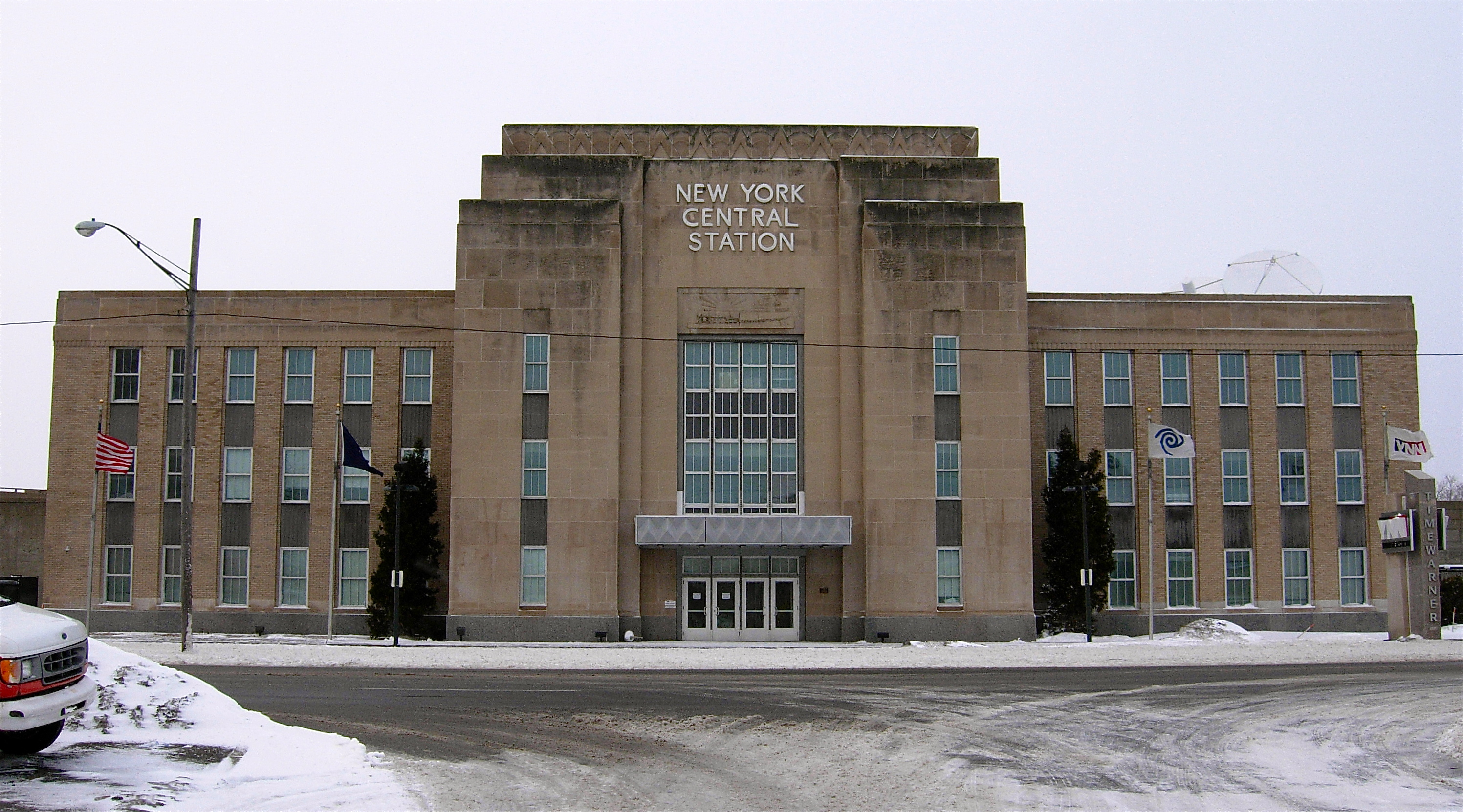
- The former headhouse of the Syracuse station

General information
- Location: 800 Erie Boulevard East and 400 Burnet Avenue, Syracuse, Onondaga County, New York
- Owner: Charter Communications

History
- Opened: September 24, 1936
- Closed: August 29, 1962

Former services
Preceding station	New York Central Railroad	Following station
Belle Isle toward Chicago	Main Line	East Syracuse toward New York
Woodard toward Oswego	Phoenix Line	Terminus
Solvay toward Rochester	Auburn Road	Terminus
Terminus	Syracuse – Massena	Liverpool toward Massena
- New York Central Railroad Passenger and Freight Station
- U.S. National Register of Historic Places
- Location within New York
- Location: 815 Erie Boulevard East and 400 Burnet Avenue, Syracuse, New York
- Coordinates: 43°3′3.7908″N 76°8′23.5896″W
- Area: 3.7 acres (1.5 ha)
- Built: 1936
- Architectural style: Art Deco
- NRHP reference No.: 09000701
- Added to NRHP: September 11, 2009
Location

New York Central Railroad Passenger Station is a former railroad station in Syracuse, New York. It was listed on the National Register of Historic Places on September 11, 2009. The former station currently is the home to Spectrum's Central New York operations.

== History ==
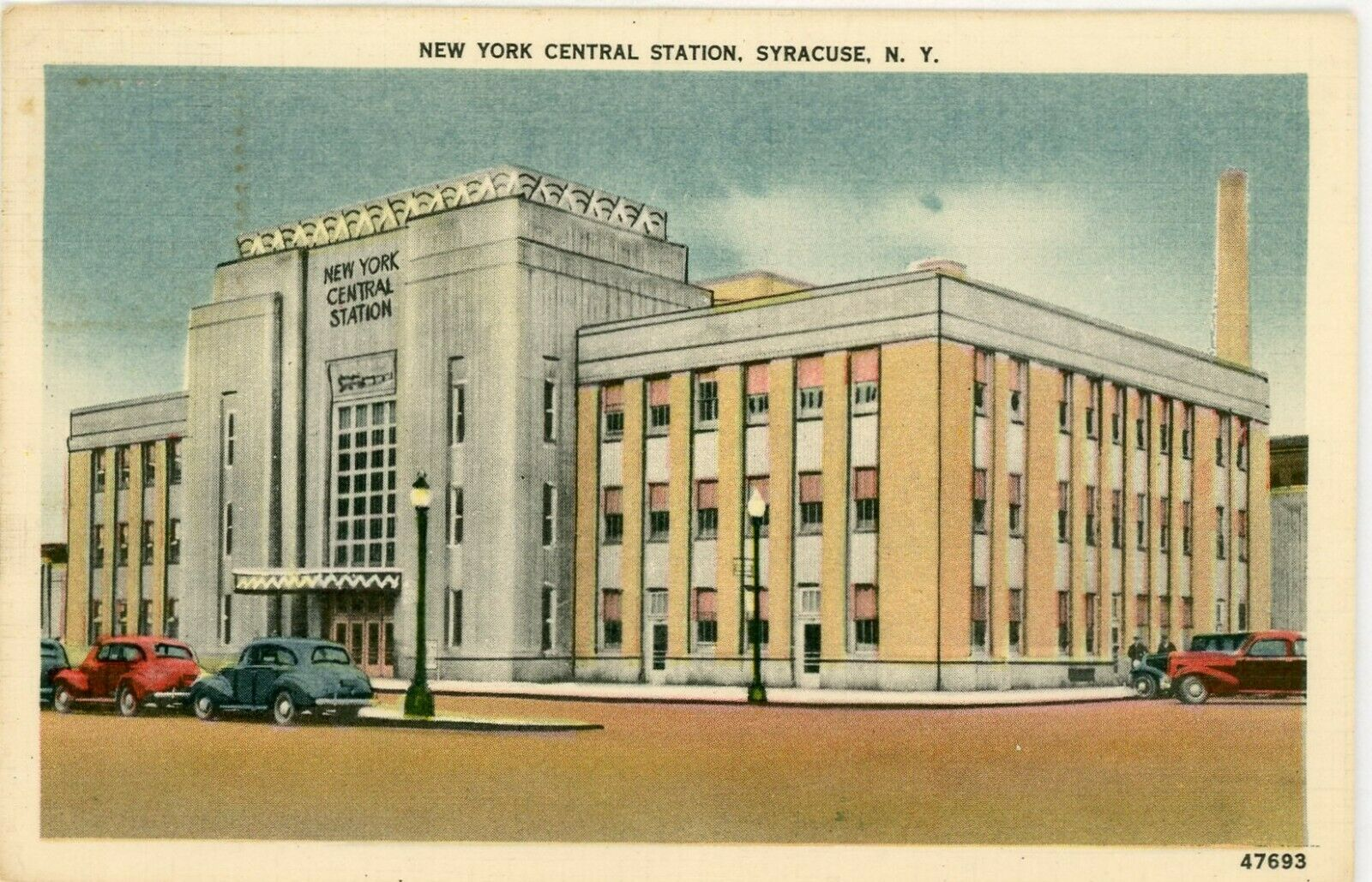
The station on a 1951 postcard

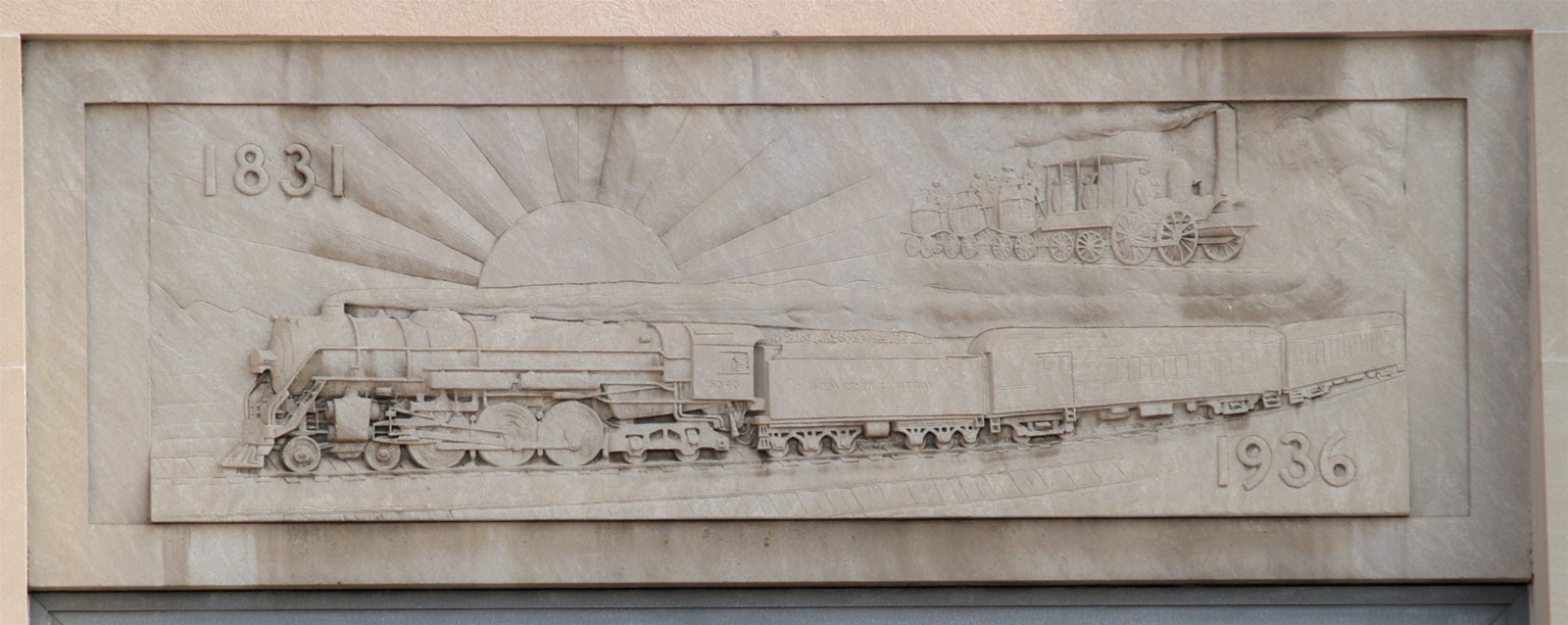
Bas Relief.

The passenger station, the third of ultimately four stations built by the New York Central Railroad to serve Syracuse, was built in 1936, when the railroad tracks that previously went through the city of Syracuse via Washington Street, at grade with pedestrians and automobiles, were elevated above city streets. It is of Art Deco design. Both the station and the new elevated route opened for business on September 24, 1936.

In 1962, after the purchase of the rail right-of-way near the 1936 passenger station by New York State for the construction of Interstate 690 necessitated usage of the old NYC freight bypass route for passenger trains through Syracuse, New York Central moved to a smaller "temporary" station near the freight yards in East Syracuse. The construction of the highway immediately behind the former station led to the demolition of all of its train platforms, with the exception of the one connected to the building and the one farthest from the building. The interior of the terminal was used as a Midtown Motors car dealership in the late 1950s to early 1960s. Greyhound continued to use it a bus terminal from 1964 until a fire in 1996. Meanwhile, train service remained at the "temporary" East Syracuse facility well into the Amtrak era. Bus and train service were reintegrated in 1998 at the William F. Walsh Regional Transportation Center near the Regional Market, on the north side of Syracuse.

The passenger building was renovated from 2001 to 2003 by Time Warner Cable (now part of Charter Spectrum), both to serve as their main office for their central New York operations, and as the Syracuse bureau and studios for News 10 Now (now Spectrum News Central New York). It serves both roles today. In 2016, New York State announced plans to restore the remaining station platform located across the highway from the station.

== See also ==
- List of RHPs in Syracuse
- Railroads in Syracuse, New York
- Syracuse station (Delaware, Lackawanna and Western Railroad)
