= Interstate Express =

Former American passenger train

Overview
- Service type: Inter-city rail
- Status: Discontinued
- Locale: Northeastern United States
- First service: 1929
- Last service: 1957
- Former operator(s): Delaware, Lackawanna and Western Railroad Central Railroad of New Jersey Reading Company Baltimore and Ohio

Route
- Termini: Syracuse, New York, U.S. Washington, D.C., U.S.
- Distance travelled: 376.2
- Average journey time: Southbound: 13 hrs 25 min Northbound: 15 hrs 35 min (1954)
- Service frequency: Daily
- Train number(s): Southbound: 1306; Northbound: 1301

On-board services
- Seating arrangements: No coach between Binghamton and Wilkes-Barre
- Sleeping arrangements: Sections and single bedrooms
- Catering facilities: Diner-Lounge

Technical
- Rolling stock: Streamlined passenger cars by Pullman Standard
- Track gauge: 4 ft 8 1/2 in (1,435 mm)

The Interstate Express was a long-distance passenger train operating between Syracuse, New York, and Philadelphia, jointly operated by the Reading Railroad, the Central Railroad of New Jersey and the Delaware, Lackawanna and Western Railroad. These lines offered a long distance overnight line in Train 1301 (north-bound)/ 1306 (south-bound). Connecting service by the Baltimore and Ohio Railroad offered continuing service south from Philadelphia to Washington, D.C.

== Service limitations ==
The train was presented as affording Washington to Syracuse travel. However, the trip required a change from riding a B&O train in metropolitan Philadelphia to a train originating from the Reading Terminal. The one-station transfer would be available at Wayne Junction in North Philadelphia. However, by 1949 the Interstate Express did not stop at Wayne Junction in the northbound direction; so, passengers would need to transfer at Lansdale station. Riders seeking to transfer in Philadelphia would need to disembark at the B&O's 24th & Chestnut Station in Philadelphia, take a cab or the Market Street subway to Reading Terminal for the originating northbound DLW train. Southbound, this transfer would be available. Indeed, by 1954, the Wayne Junction stop would be eliminated from the timetable, so a transfer at Lansdale station transfer would be needed in both directions in latter years of the train.

Originally, the entire trip was possible via coach. However, by mid-1949, there were no coaches between Wilkes-Barre, Pennsylvania, and the next stop, Binghamton, New York. Thus, full-length travel was only possible by sleeper car. The Binghamton to Syracuse segment was joined by cars from a direct DLW Railroad train from that company's Hoboken Terminal. However, the operators allowed for passengers to split their trip between part of the trip in sleeping cars or in parlor cars and other parts of the trip in coaches.

The train's service ended by 1957.

== The scheduled stops ==
Reading southbound as one reads down

- Syracuse (Lackawanna Station)
- Tully
- Homer (stopping north-bound only by the mid-1950s)
- Cortland
- Marathon
- Whitney Point (stopping north-bound only by the mid-1950s)
- Binghamton (Lackawanna Station)
- Wilkes-Barre (Central of New Jersey Station)
- Jim Thorpe (nee Mauch Chunk)
- Allentown (Allentown station (Central Railroad of New Jersey)) (eliminated by the mid-1950s)
- Bethlehem (Union Station) (stopping south-bound only by the mid-1950s)
- Lansdale (Lansdale station)
- North Philadelphia (Wayne Junction) (stopping south-bound only by the mid-1950s)
- Philadelphia (Reading Terminal)

=== Connecting spur from Buffalo to Binghamton ===
The train was timed to receive passengers from the Hoboken to Buffalo night train, the Owl (#15). Southbound, the connecting train was the New York Mail (#10).

Reading west-east as one reads down

- Buffalo (Lackawanna Station)
- Corning
- Elmira
- Binghamton (Lackawanna Station)

=== Connecting Baltimore & Ohio service from Philadelphia to Washington, D.C. ===
Reading north-south as one reads down

- Wilmington
- Baltimore (Mount Royal Station)
- Washington, D.C. (Union Station)

== Services ==
This overnight train offered sleeper car service from Philadelphia to Syracuse. The connecting Washington to Philadelphia service offered a dining car-parlor car.
