= Jefferson Clinton Hotel =

- U.S. Historic district – Contributing property
- Location within New York Location within the United States
- Location: 416 South Clinton Street, Syracuse, New York
- Coordinates: 43.0473°N 76.1539°W
- Built: 1927
- Architect: Gustavus A. Young
- Part of: Armory Square Historic District (ID84002816)
- Designated CP: September 7, 1984

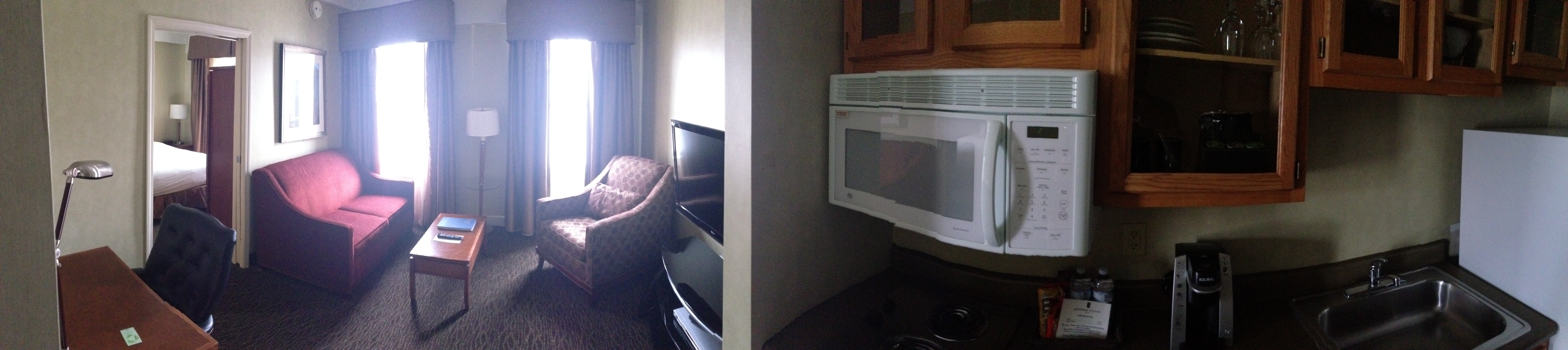
Jefferson Clinton Hotel, 2013

The Jefferson Clinton Hotel, formerly known as the Dome Hotel, in the Armory Square area of Syracuse, New York, United States, is a hotel dating from 1927.

It was designed by architect Gustavus A. Young, who also worked on the design for the Hotel Syracuse (1924).

It is a 10-story building designed in the commercial style, incorporating light-colored brick, carved stone, and terra cotta. It has "delicately carved stone lintels" above its second-floor windows. These are 25 single or double windows, around three sides of the building. It is a three-part commercial-style building.

It is a contributing building in the Armory Square Historic District, listed on the National Register of Historic Places in 1984. The hotel is identified as the "Dome Hotel" in the NRHP nomination. (Note: In the NRHP nomination, the Dome Hotel is listed with address given as 200-02 West Jefferson St. Google Maps suggests 200 West Jefferson is the Armory building in the center of the oval, while 202 West Jefferson is the Jefferson Clinton Hotel building.)

Out of surviving historic hotel buildings in the district, including the Kirk Block (c. 1869), the Crown Hotel (c. 1876), and the Stag Hotel (1869), the 1927-built Jefferson Clinton is the only one which has not been converted to other uses. It continues "as one of the city's largest hotels, distinguished by its Commercial style design with carved stone lintels and smooth stone facing on the lower two stories." (Note: The Hotel Syracuse (1924), which had 790 guest rooms, would have always been the largest, until it closed in 2004.)

== Name ==
It is located at the intersection of West Jefferson Street and South Clinton Street in downtown Syracuse. It was identified as the Dome Hotel in the 1984 listing of the historic district. Per a tourism website, "During the Great Depression, the hotel was taken over by the City of Syracuse and was renamed the Dome Hotel. This hotel closed in 1986 and remained vacant until 2001 when it reopened as Hawthorn Suites." (Note: What its original name was, and when it became the Jefferson Clinton, is not covered in sources immediately available. But after 1980 construction of the Carrier Dome (the indoor arena where Syracuse Orange basketball plays) the name "Dome Hotel" likely would have been confusing, suggesting a location close to that unrelated place, which is up a hill and about 1.4 miles (2.3 km) away.)
