= Central New York Regional Market =

Terminal food market complex

Coordinates: 43.07339°N 76.16854°W

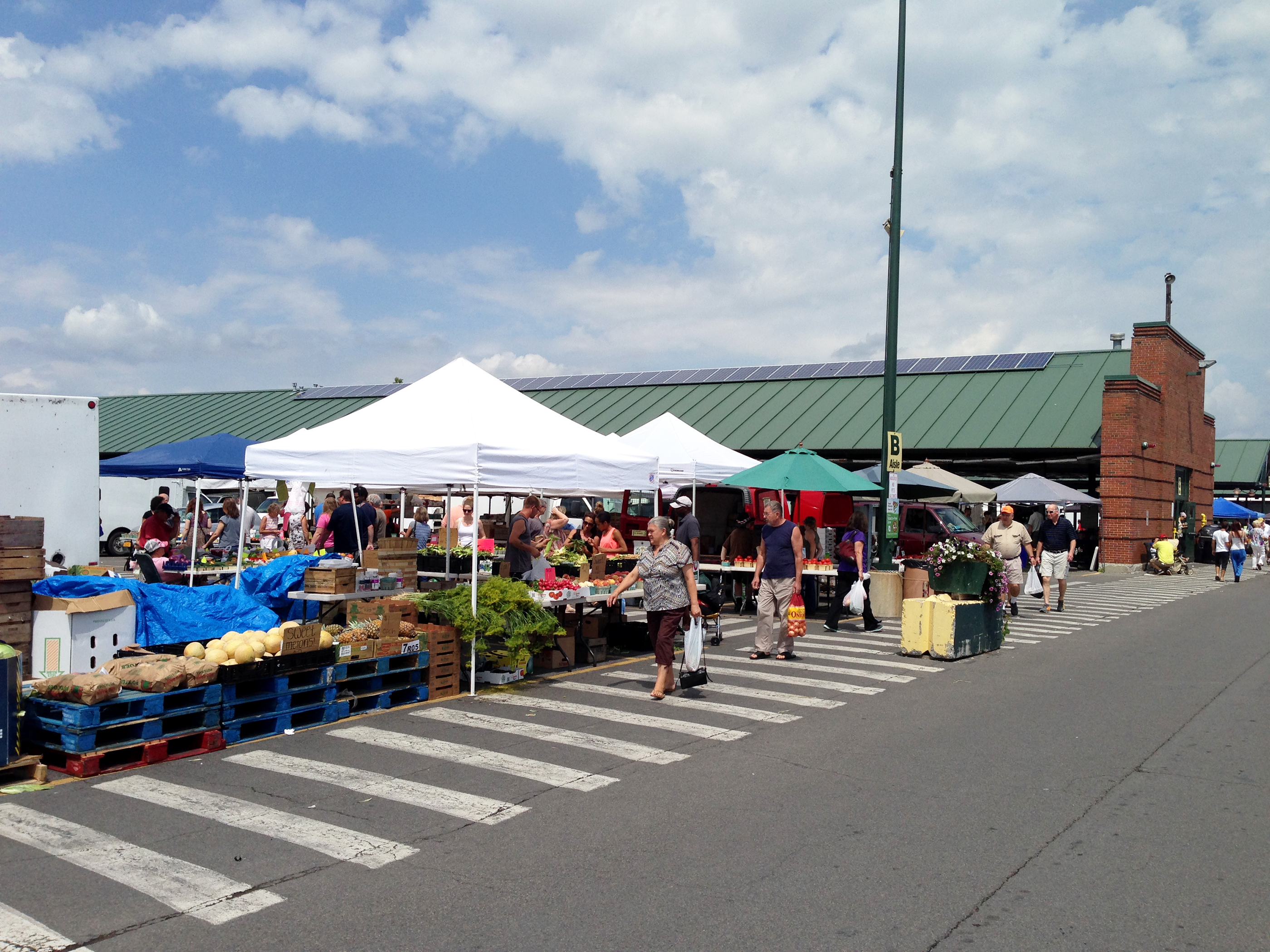
CNY Regional Market

The Central New York Regional Market (CNY Regional Market), located on the north side of Syracuse, New York, is a State Authority (public), retail-wholesale, terminal food market complex. Although a State Authority, the Market has not received any public funding for over 20 years. In 2010, the market estimated that it had a hand in hosting sales of nearly $70 million per year in farm products.

Operated by the state-established Central New York Regional Market Authority, the market has stayed at its current location since first opening for business under the government's umbrella in 1938. Its main entrance is a roadway that is today designated Farmers' Market Place, located at 2100 Park Street, immediately opposite the mouth of the Exit 23 ramp from Interstate Route 81 northbound. The market area can also be accessed via other curb cuts along Park Street, as well as via roadways NBT Bank Parkway and Tex Simone Drive which have been set up in modern times to serve both the market and its neighbors, the William F. Walsh Regional Transportation Center, and NBT Bank Stadium.

== Commercial Real Estate ==
The market authority's overall mandate includes acting as landlord to several full-time food- or service-related businesses fronting on (or generally situate close to) the Park Street side.

In 2005, around the corner at 301 Hiawatha Boulevard East, there is a warehouse parcel which the authority purchased out of the Peter's Groceries bankruptcy. In September 2020, further up the block, the authority took out a mortgage to buy the Fox Hollow Movers facility at 513 Hiawatha Blvd. East for $2.2 million; this is in connection with a proposal involving a centralized kitchen, storage, and processing facility for Syracuse City Schools. Lastly, the authority technically owns the Byrne Dairy-Syracuse Cold Storage "freezer plant" situated at 245 Tex Simone Drive, a construction dating from 1990 on the basis of a long-term lease inked in 1988 in a collaboration with state economic development officials. All of this land and all of the buildings situated thereon remain assessed to the public sector's Regional Market Authority, although some of the parcels have been developed in such a way that they do, in fact, pay local property taxes.

From the very beginning, another key part of the market's business meant acting as landlord to several full-time produce wholesalers who are set up on leases within the interior "commission houses," three of which run alongside Farmers' Market Place, and a fourth of newer construction situated behind. The market's website indicates it currently has three wholesaling tenants: G. & R. D'Agostino Quality Produce, Peter A. Guinta & Son Produce, and Russo Produce.

== Retail Markets ==
Syracuse's Regional Market is best known to the public for the part-time retail markets it hosts within the heart of its campus, 7 a.m. to 2 p.m., every Saturday and Sunday year-round, and Thursdays from May through to the Thursday before Thanksgiving. Thursday and Saturday are primarily about food buying for domestic consumption, plus nursery plants in season, but there may be some crafts, antiques, collectibles, and flea-market-type vendors on hand, along with sellers of prepared food. The Sunday market is primarily a crafts, antiques, collectibles, and flea market, but, again, there may be some produce, plants, and prepared food vendors here also. Over peak periods, and including all three retail markets, the Syracuse site was touted in 2010 as serving 40,000 individual shoppers per week.

=== Saturday Market ===
By far, the most storied and best attended market is the Saturday farmers' market, which cycles through shifting seasons which stall lease agreement drafters have broken down as the Growers' Season, May-Oct.; then the Holiday Season, Nov.-Dec.; and lastly the Winter Season, Jan.-Apr. Naturally, Saturday market attendance peaks over the May to October run, when attendance starts to pick up for early season crops (plus flower garden plants, and rooted vegetable "starts," both coming out of greenhouses), and then builds into harvest time for the widest range of fruits and vegetables that are actually field-grown in the immediate Central New York area.

In August 2008, the market's car count was reported to be 9,300 for a typical Saturday. In May 2013, Syracuse Dot Com food and drink maven Don Cazentre recorded the peak-season Saturday attendance to have then been about 26,000 shoppers. At that more recent time—in answer to complaints that the Saturday market may have gotten over-congested—the market was reported to have 1,000 parking spaces clearly painted on pavement within walking distance to its Retail Market area. Added to this, there was room on gravel for another 400 vehicles, northeast across the roadway (NBT Bank Parkway) next to the Byrne Dairy-Syracuse Cold Storage facility. Furthermore, on market Saturdays, when wholesalers are not busy moving or unloading trucks, there are another 800 parking spaces available in that area of the overall campus—to the left of, to the right of, and beyond the trio of so-called "commission houses."

When the Saturday market is seasonally running at full bustle, nearly all of the 450 maximum-capacity stall spaces are occupied. That's not an accurate gauge of the maximum-capacity number of vendors, however, as some do enough business to lease more than one adjoining stall. The market's web site currently touts the Saturday market vendor population as more than 300. Another source, a Saturday vendor list printed to PDF in October 2019, shows 194 sellers from 19 Upstate New York counties, ranging from as far west as Monroe, Ontario, and Yates; as far south as Tioga, Cortland, and Chenango; and as far east as Montgomery and Otsego. At the coldest times of year, on the other hand, the entire Saturday market can nearly be squeezed into just the A Shed.

=== Thursday Market ===
Another answer to customer complaints that Saturday's market may have grown too difficult to navigate is to suggest that some shoppers could simply move their food-buying schedule to Thursdays. On that day, even in high season, the market consists of little more than a partially filled A Shed and adjoining open-air B Aisle. Naturally, not all of one's favorite vendors can be expected to be in attendance. Regardless, board meeting minutes from March 2019 noted then-Executive Director Ben Vitale's concern that Thursday's market remained in decline, and was without a turn-around plan on the horizon.

Historically, the Thursday market actually ran into the evening hours. One old-timer on the Facebook Group Nostalgic Syracuse recalled Summer Thursday nights in which her family brought home bushels of produce—so that they were ready to process it all for freezing or canning over the weekend. In 2010, Don Cazentre from the Syracuse newspaper reported Thursday market hours were 10 a.m. to 6 p.m., and, in 2011, that was trimmed to 10 a.m. to 5 p.m. By 2013 (and perhaps a year earlier), the Thursday market hours were shifted to match the same as what people were able to commit to memory for the weekends, 7 a.m. to 2 p.m.

=== Sunday Market ===
A Sunday vendor list printed to PDF in October 2019 shows 59 flea marketeers from 10 Upstate New York counties.

=== Market Tokens ===
The Welcome Center serves as the main office during retail market hours (the real, full-time main office is actually inside the Market Commons building). It is the small brick building located between A Shed and the Market Commons building. Among other pieces of business, the Welcome Center is where EBT and Debit/Credit tokens are dispensed. Here is how these tokens work:

EBT Silver Tokens are $1 each, and are intended to cut down on the red tape burdening transactions in which, typically, food stamp recipients wish to spend their "electronic benefit transfer" resources at the market among multiple vendors, many of whom are operating without swipe or scan technology. Instead, EBT cards from any state can be swiped beforehand at the Welcome Center, converting a specified amount into EBT Silver Tokens at $1 per. These tokens never expire, but, if desired, unspent tokens can be returned with the receipt, and the card re-loaded. Produce vendors aren’t giving any cash change, since the silver tokens are in one dollar increments, and pretty much everything can be purchased in whole dollar amounts.

Gold Tokens are $5 each, and they work similarly, but they are intended for use by shoppers who—for reasons of habit, or personal safety, or points-building—typically go around town without carrying significant cash, instead relying on credit or debit cards. Again, any Visa, MasterCard, or Discover card can be swiped beforehand at the Welcome Center, converting a specified amount into Gold Tokens at $5 per. No additional or ATM fee is charged. Again, these tokens never expire, and unspent ones can be returned with a receipt. In the case of the gold tokens, vendors will give change in cash.

=== Retail Market Layout ===
Physically, the official Retail Market is that fenced-in sequence of aligned, parallel structures or spaces commonly referenced as A Shed, B Aisle, C Shed, D Shed, E Shed, and F Shed, running southwest to northeast. B Aisle is simply an open-air area between two of the structures, with vendor stall boundaries painted on the pavement.

The layout from the frontmost Market Commons building, to the Welcome Center behind, and then further to the retail area's row of sheds running A to E is all of vintage design and footprint, appearing virtually unchanged on aerial and landscape photos going all the way back to the market's first year. A and C sheds hint at art deco styling in brick, featuring warehouse end wall parapets that mirror similar construction in the nearby wholesale-only commission houses. In A Shed, which is a wider structure, the parapets frame a raised embankment of windows running along the central spine, designed for cost-effective natural lighting within. D and E sheds, on the other hand, started out as little more than roofs over steel-framed barns, open at all four walls; in fact, these last two sheds were reportedly moved from the ancestral city market's location near the intersection of Pearl Street with North Salina.

These oldest sheds remain true to their spartan conception, in which low operating costs, quick business, traffic flow, and ventilation are viewed as paramount. They are also set up in strict deference to maximizing operating efficiency, wherein most vendors are able to unload early in the morning, and reload early in the afternoon, by simply backing a vehicle up to or through each stall's exterior entrance. Vendors turn to set up tables inside so as to face potential buyers milling about along the central axis of each building. Today, during the heating season, in A, E, and F sheds, overhead rolling doors are mandated for closure from 7 a.m. to 1 p.m., helping keep in some heat. For much of the year, however, most of the market is effectively an open air operation, with only roofs protecting against precipitation. Public restrooms are few, having been recently installed down on the end, in the newest F Shed and in the upgraded E Shed; at the other end, needy market attendees have customarily traversed to the Market Commons building, just southwest of the Welcome Center and A Shed.

F Shed is the retail market's newest permanent structure, debuting in April 2013. It replaced what was previously a sequence of tents deployed ad hoc over pavement during appropriate times of the year. Erected over a floating concrete slab, F Shed matches the same length of 273 feet which appears in the lineup of existing, older sheds, but it splays wider than some of them at 80 feet. During times before or after the COVID-19 crisis, this allows room for 75 rent-able retail stalls within a fully clear-spanned space, as provided for by the steel support structure. Legacy Building Solutions of South Haven, MN, handled the custom design, engineering, and erection. The roof is a translucent "tension fabric," and the heating system is capable of melting snow off of it, when necessary. F Shed was built for $1.5 million paid from the authority's reserves, without borrowing. For some younger attendees, F Shed is probably better known as the site of an occasional band concert, or a winter beer-tasting festival, rather than as the shed on the end within an old-school produce market.

=== Ongoing Controversies ===
There has long been tension between true farmer-producers versus dealers in foodstuffs that have been brought in on a wholesale basis, potentially from a great distance. In modern times, the authority takes the public stance that both types of vendors are, without question, needed in order to give consumers the widest possible set of choices over the entire year. What that means, in practice, is that consumers who wish to buy, as much as possible, directly and locally, must do their own work of getting to know their favorite vendors, and of honing their skills of observation. The market organizers are not going to arbitrate, in other words.

Past reporting, however, suggests the market knows exactly who's who with regard to its vendors. In August 2008, Jennifer Creighton of the Syracuse Post Standard did a fairly detailed institutional profile of the market. At that time, produce vendors were broken down three ways. The "Farmers" category meant 100 percent of what they were selling was homegrown; "New York State Dealers" meant their offerings were 100 percent from in-state; and "Out-of-State Dealers" would be the category if any portion came from outside New York. As for rental fees, out-of-state dealers paid the most, up to four times the amount a farmer would have paid for equivalent space at equivalent times of year. At the time, the market was at full capacity, and reported 260 out of the 350 stalls available, or 74 percent, were booked by vendors that qualified as actual farmers.

In April 2020, Don Cazentre of Syracuse Dot Com reported the continued existence of a similar sliding scale in rental fees, in which New York State growers generally pay less per stall than merchants in commercially transported food or in non-food items.

The pro-farmers favoritism only goes so far, however. In 2010, then-Executive Director Ben Vitale was interviewed by a blogger, and he described an old rule in Syracuse which tried to forbid wholesale sourcing for specified types of produce during times when those items should be locally in season. Unfortunately, Vitale reported, that wound up creating occasions when nobody could buy a decent tomato anywhere at the market, because a single local farmer had shown up with otherwise un-presentable fruit, harvested after a frost, and was claiming exclusive rights to sell them. "That's one of the reasons our market, a state authority, doesn’t limit trade," Vitale said.

== Organization ==
The market is run by a professional staff of seven, and governed by a board of directors of 13 in which farmer-producers have the greatest share of power, due to the authority's construction under state law. State law also specifies the numerical representation from each of the counties falling within the market district (Onondaga, Oswego, Cayuga, Madison, Cortland, Oneida, and later the eastern part of Wayne), with the more populous counties having more seats on the board. Each county government uses its own process to name its own representative to fill any of its designated, open seats. The Commissioner of the New York State Department of Agriculture and Markets (or, actually in practice, his or her designated representative) also sits on the board.

The market endeavors to be self-sustaining in terms of operating costs. A 5-year budget committed to print in February 2021 shows the Syracuse-based authority proposing to both make and spend $1.910 million in its fiscal year running 2021-2022. This was 10 percent higher than the amounts listed for four fiscal years previously, 2017-2018 ($1.729 million in both income and expenses). The amounts proposed for five fiscal years later, 2026-2027 ($2.203 million in both income and expenses) show the authority is expecting to slowly grow about 15 percent over that stretch of time. None of the budget operating income lines show any evidence of ongoing government support. Income came mainly from commercial leases, land leases, and retail market rents, and the biggest expense, by far, is payroll.

Just as a point of comparison, the neighboring Genesee Valley RMA proposed for its 2021-2022 fiscal year to take in $3.971 million on $2.946 million in expenditures. The Rochester authority has evolved, since its creation in 1951, much more in the direction of real estate development, rather than emphasizing its roots as a regional farmers' market. In fact, the Rochester market web site, viewed as late as January 2022, was still reporting apologies for having no Summer 2021 farmers' market.

Back in Syracuse, an auditor's report valued the facility's property, plant and equipment, net, as $6,519,110 as of March 31, 2019.

== History ==
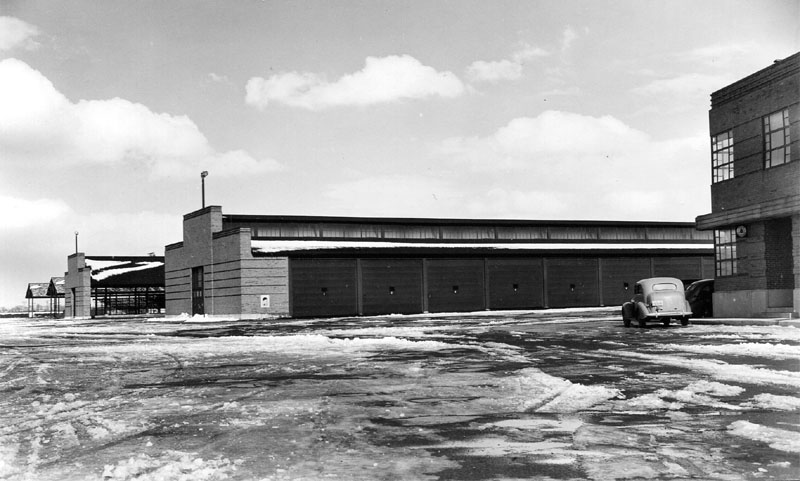
Circa 1938, the newly built Market Commons building (right) and the A, C, D, and E Sheds (background).

The publicly built facilities of the market were, in great part, a creation of The New Deal, designed by the federal Roosevelt Administration to help bring America out of the Great Depression after the Stock Market Crash of 1929.

=== Ancestral Markets ===
Previously, of course, Central New York farmers brought produce to Syracuse and sold to the public at so-called "string bean markets," or "city markets," which originated as rather less formal affairs. Noteworthy historical gathering places, for instance, were downtown in Clinton Square adjoining the Erie Canal, and, later, on the near north side during a period when elevated freight trains still served downtown Syracuse, including the movement of perishables in bulk. The north side market was originally close to the intersection of Pearl and North Salina streets, but—from 1924 into the Thirties—Syracuse tried expanding it nearby, up to 1,500 feet linearly, along several blocks of an active roadway known as Oswego Boulevard, which had been newly built atop the abandoned, city-side stretch of the original Oswego Canal. However, within a few years, this first-draft expansion attempt was deemed inadequate, if not unsafe, and city officials came around to welcoming a move for the whole market, under a regional umbrella, fixed by state law. Today, nearly the entire run of Oswego Boulevard has been obliterated under the path of Route 81 and its connections.

=== Regional Market Authority ===
New York State created the Central New York Regional Market Authority in 1933. In fact, starting in the Thirties, New York State also set up regional market authorities in Western New York (Buffalo), the Capital District (Menands), and the Lower Hudson Valley (Poughkeepsie and Newburgh). Today, however, only the Central New York (Syracuse) and the Genesee Valley (Greater Rochester area) markets remain in business under the regional market authority style of organization. The Southern Tier, the Leatherstocking Region, the Mohawk Valley, the North Country, and most of downstate never got their own market authorities, although enabling legislation did eventually pass in 1999 for Long Island, whose market remains in existence only on paper.

In May 1935, appointed market officials in Central New York confirmed their preferred headquarters location at Syracuse's Park Street near Hiawatha Boulevard East, formerly Free Street. News reports simplified the proposed purchase as being of the so-called Chapman site, which was said to cost $75,000; in truth, Chapman was just the largest of more than a dozen transactions necessary for consolidating splintered ownership over 56 acres adjoining what was then Municipal Stadium. Another source says altogether it was a $159,000 purchase. In either case, of course, these are dollars from the Thirties.

On September 19, 1935, opponents of the proposed Syracuse market site spoke at a hearing directly before Governor Herbert H. Lehman and his appointed Agriculture Department chief. Opposition was reported to be coming from commission merchants, an organization of vegetable growers, and the Onondaga County Pomona Grange. While the Park Street decision was endorsed by 12 of the 13 board members from the authority itself, opponents decried the location as too swampy, too expensive to buy and develop, and situate at the "dead end" of Syracuse. Nonetheless, Gov. Lehman announced the Park Street choice was a done deal within nine days of the hearing. In December 1935, deeds started going of record.

Old maps show the area was indeed a marshy lowland situate south of the main freight line of the New York Central Railroad and an Onondaga Lake tributary that is today universally recognized as Ley Creek. The land previously hosted lumber company facilities and, prior to that, to the northeast, rows of brine troughs with moveable rolling roofs, from which salt was slowly extracted using solar evaporation. Also, up until about 1918, canal boats were still being towed along the original path of the Oswego Canal, a waterway that ran across what would become the Regional Market site (as did adjoining side cuts attached to this canal and running northeasterly and southwesterly). Filling in this canal wasn't fully finished until the Onondaga Lake Parkway was opened to motor vehicles atop this part of the canal's historic route in 1931.

While building plans were still being drafted, grading of the site started in December 1935. The project later formalized previously promised heavy underwriting from the federal Public Works Administration (PWA), which was a separate agency from the better known Works Progress Administration (WPA). Again reporting in dollars from the Thirties, the PWA supplied a $450,000 loan and a $486,728 grant for the project, in which the final cost came in at $1,124,783, placing the federal investment at more than 83 percent of the initial project cost. Cortland architect Carl W. Clark was the designer, and Rochester firm A. Friederich and Sons Co. served as building contractor.

Another source, dated within days of the market's opening, differs as to the initial cost, pegging it at $750,000 in 1938 dollars. Yet another contemporaneous source called it a $1,045,000 produce center.

=== The Forties and The Fifties ===
The early decades of the 1940s and 1950s were a market heyday. But attendance began to stagnate during the rise of large chain grocery stores, from the 1960s onward.

=== The $8.4 Million Renovation ===
In August 1998, during a governor's race in New York, the market finally won a State Legislative grant for an $8.4 million renovation. Planning for the work actually originated 13 years earlier, in March 1985, when the market asked the U.S. Department of Agriculture to study the feasibility of spending $25 million to demolish all 18 buildings then on site, and to replace them with modern designs. At the time, market leaders openly bemoaned the age and the rundown state of their buildings, all in disrepair and outmoded. One headline described the market as "seedy" and "squeezed." On the one hand, there were not enough customers, with reportedly only enough parking spaces for 300 cars. On the other hand, there was also not enough room for all those who wanted to become vendors at the market, with hundreds stuck on a waiting list.

As the years wore on, the $25 million project shrunk to $24 million, then to $12 million, then to $3 million, and then finally the money came through at $8.4 million.

Meanwhile, in between 1985 and 1998, the nearby Carousel Center mall, later known as Destiny USA, was announced and built, with its initial opening in 1990; the neighboring Pioneer freezer plant, now Byrne Dairy-Syracuse Cold Storage, was announced and built on market lands with state assistance, opening in 1990; the neighboring MacArthur Stadium ball park was announced for demolition and rebuilding on a fresh footprint nearby, re-opening in 1997; and the William F. Walsh Regional Transportation Center, a combined train and bus station, was announced and built on market-sold acreage, opening in 1998. All of these developments also led to the creation or reconfiguration of the roadways in and through the area, forming what are known today as NBT Bank Parkway, Tex Simone Drive, and Farmers' Market Place.

Two different directors working to push through a renovation plan were effectively ousted in connection with tension brought about by the long wait for funding. In Feb. 1992, Larry Cimino was forced out after serving 10 years due to a corruption scandal in which he was accused of deriving low-level personal benefits from authority resources. Cimino's replacement, Janet "Jay" Sedlack, of Camillus was a former Wall Street bond analyst who served five years until April 1997, when she resigned in the face of board intentions to down-grade her position.

Ben Vitale of Auburn, NY, came in as a temporary replacement, but lasted the next 22 years. Vitale first got on the authority's Board of Directors four years earlier, in 1993, representing Cayuga County, and he additionally served as Vice President in 1994, and President in 1996. Around about the same time, the mantra of "local foods" started to take hold as something like a full-blown social movement, with interest in farmers markets on the upswing nationally. Meanwhile, however, the market complex in Syracuse was at "its lowest point... in shambles," according to Vitale.

One of the first upgrades came in late 1998, when a separate $600,000 state grant paid to construct Farmers' Market Place over the top of what was previously considered an access lane through the heart of the market.

As for the rest, the record discernible from aerial photos shows, sometime between 1996 and 2003, several run-down buildings (a former hot dog stand, and an ice house) were demolished along the market's northern perimeter, including what was once known as the poultry shed, situate where parking lots are placed currently, directly northwest of the B Aisle. Also taken out was the Russo Building, which was situate in an area that would later host the F Shed.

Over about the same time frame, under-utilized rail spurs which angled toward the southeast side of the commission houses were pulled up, creating room for what is today known as the "truck court." Also pulled up was most of the long half-circle of railroad track coming off of the main railroad line (CSX in the modern day), a spur that was necessary for getting box cars parked all the way over along that side of the market. Attending the market today, if you exit or enter from the back side, your car will inevitably bump over rails from this spur that are still embedded in what's now called Tex Simone Drive.

Renovations to the A Shed, the commission houses, and to the Market Commons building were also undertaken.
