= Oswego and Syracuse Railroad =

Overview
- Locale: Syracuse, New York to Oswego, New York
- Dates of operation: 1839–1872
- Successor: Delaware, Lackawanna and Western Railroad

Technical
- Track gauge: 4 ft 8 1/2 in (1,435 mm) standard gauge

The Oswego and Syracuse Railroad was formed on April 29, 1839, and the route was surveyed during the summer of that year. The Company was fully organized on March 25, 1847. The road was opened on May 14, 1848, and ran a total distance of 35.5 miles (57.1 km) from Syracuse, New York to Oswego, New York. In 1872 it passed under the management of the Delaware, Lackawanna and Western Railroad.

== History ==
One of the oldest surviving railroad structures in New York State is the 1848 freight house of the Oswego and Syracuse Railroad in Oswego, New York. It is situated along West Utica Street, approximately one block west of the site of the former Delaware, Lackawanna and Western Railroad (DL&WRR) depot.

For many years, the DL&WRR maintained offices in Old City Hall in village of Oswego built in 1836 to rival the Market House in Albany. It is a three-story brick structure. The third floor was wide open and used to provide drill space for the local militia during the winter months. The city built a new building a few blocks south in 1871.

By 1862, the passenger depot in Syracuse was located at the New York Central Railroad passenger depot where the baggage master was Arthur Hughes. The freight house was located West of New York Central Freight Houses in the 5th Ward. Freight agent was P. Bassett and tallyman was James Murray.

The railroad had stations in Syracuse, Baldwinsville, Lamsons, South Granby, Fulton, Minetto and Oswego.

=== Freight rail ===
An act was passed by the New York State Legislature during their assembly in 1847 which allowed the Oswego and Syracuse Railroad Company to carry freight provided they paid tolls to New York State.

=== Company management ===
In 1862, F. T. Carrington from Oswego was president and Allen Monroe from Syracuse was vice-president. Secretary was A. P. Grant and treasurer was Luther Wright, both from Oswego, along with George Skinner who was superintendent.

Directors of the company in 1862 included; F. T. Carrington, Luther Wright, A. P. Grant, J. Turrill, S. Doolittle, all of Oswego. Additionally, E. B. Judson, Allen Monroe, E. R. Wicks, T. T. Davis of Syracuse and R. H. King and H. H. Martin, both from Albany and M. Islam of New York City.

=== Syracuse, Binghamton and New York railroad ===
The Oswego and Syracuse Railroad consolidated with the Syracuse, Binghamton and New York Railroad in 1853 after the act was authorized by the New York State Legislature.

In 1860, the rail was authorized along with New York Central Railroad Company to build a station house in Geddes.

=== Delaware, Lackawanna and Western railroad ===
The DL&WRR bought the Syracuse, Binghamton and New York Railroad in 1869 and leased the Oswego and Syracuse Railroad on February 13, 1869. This gave them a branch from Binghamton north and northwest via Syracuse to Oswego, a port on Lake Ontario.

When the DL&WRR took over the Oswego and Syracuse Railroad in 1872, the road acquired the former hall for its shipping offices in the Great Lakes port. They held ownership until 1946.

Preceded by	Oswego and Syracuse Railroad chartered April 29, 1839 charter renewed May 14, 1845 merged December 20, 1945	Succeeded by Delaware, Lackawanna and Western Railroad
