= Railroad Terminal Historic District (Binghamton, New York) =

Historic district in New York, United States

Binghamton
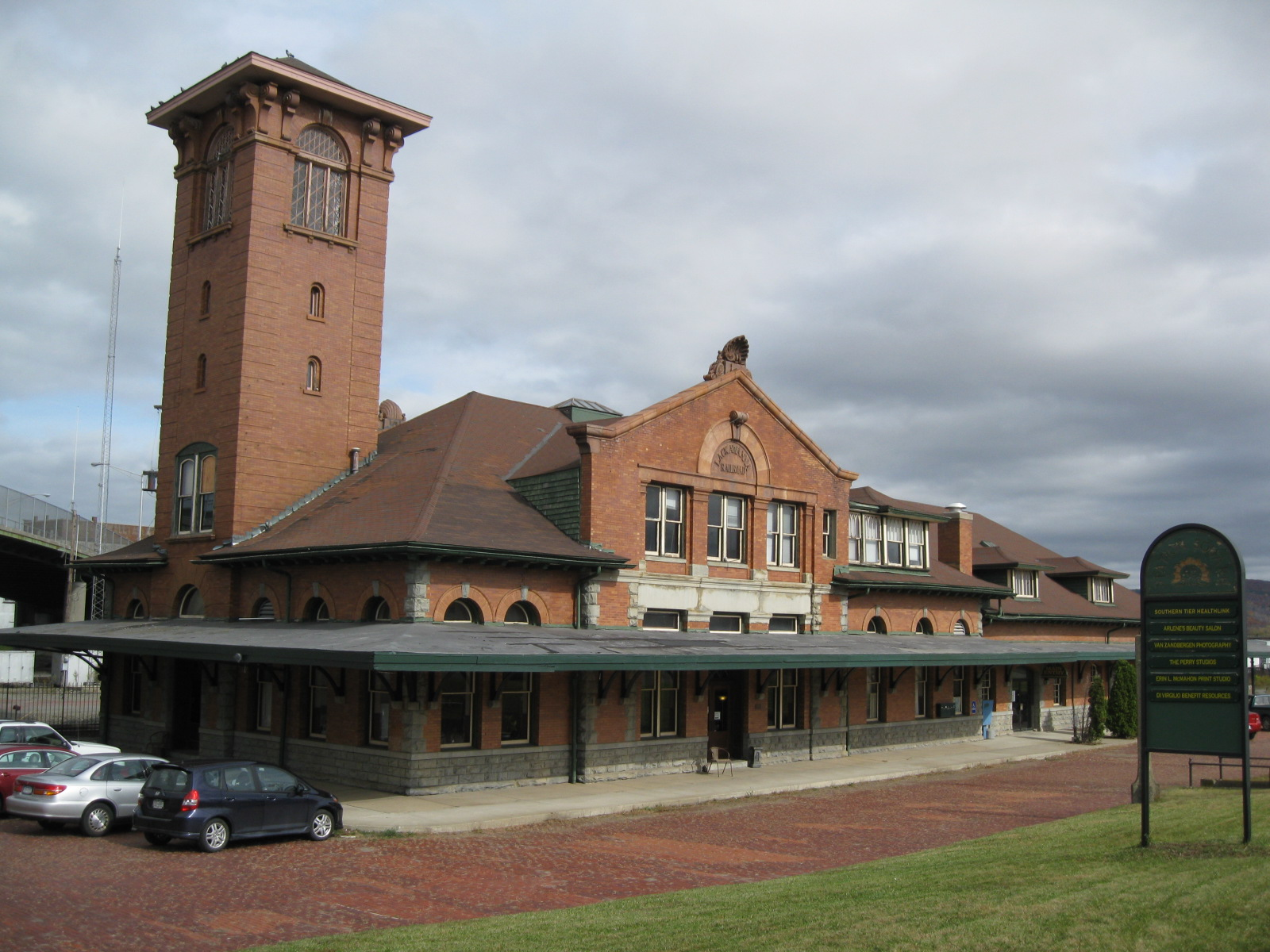
- The DL&W station on October 27, 2009

General information
- Location: 45 Lewis Street, Binghamton, New York 13901
- Tracks: 2

History
- Opened: 1901
- Closed: January 6, 1970

Former services
Preceding station	Delaware, Lackawanna and Western Railroad	Following station
Painted Post toward Buffalo	Main Line	Scranton toward Hoboken
Johnson City toward Buffalo	Main Line	Conklin Centre toward Hoboken
Chenango Bridge toward Utica	Utica Branch	Terminus
Chenango Bridge toward Oswego	Oswego Branch	Terminus
- Railroad Terminal Historic District
- U.S. National Register of Historic Places
- U.S. Historic district
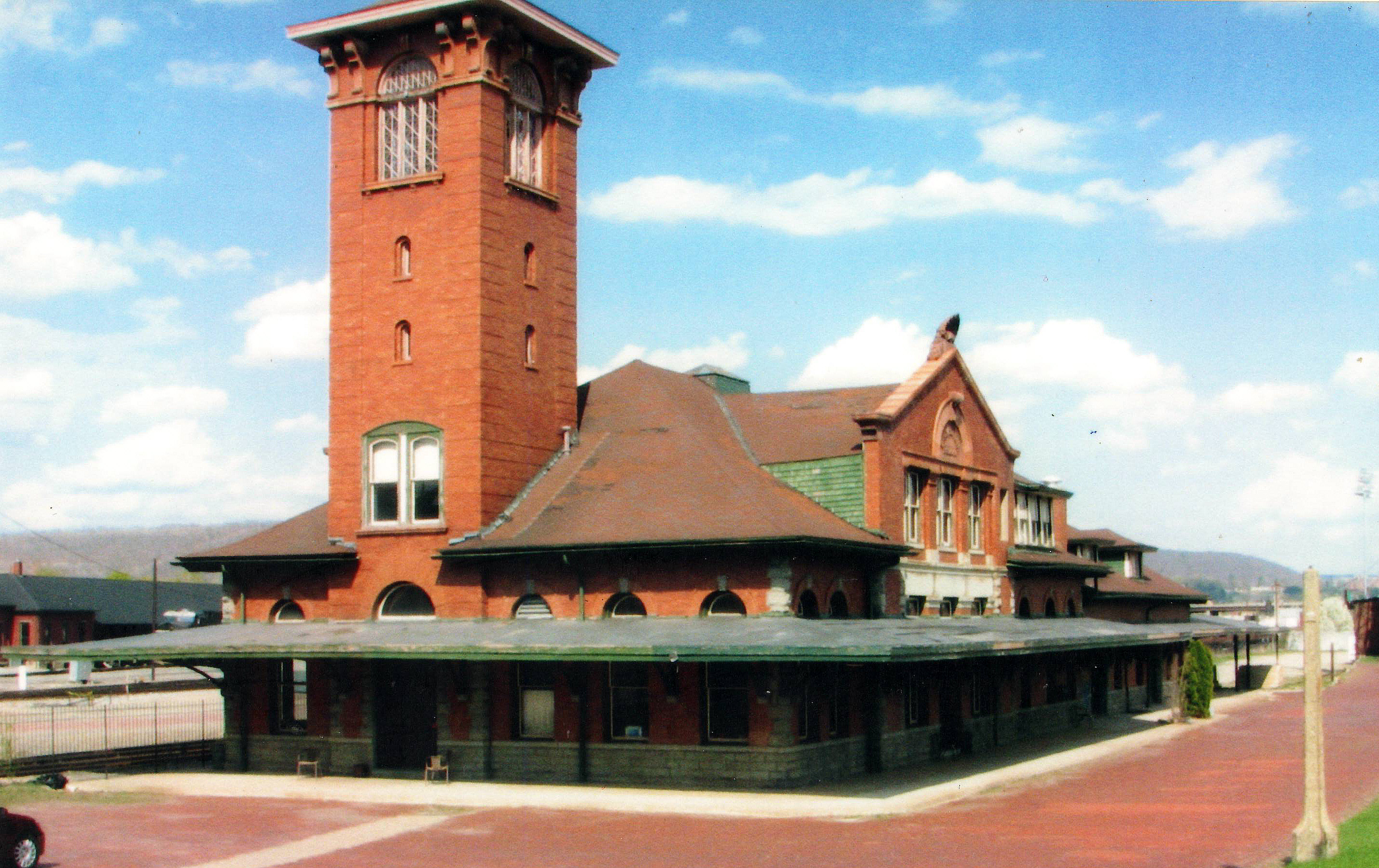
- The former Delaware, Lackawanna and Western Railroad passenger station, April, 2009

- Location within New York Location within the United States
- Location: Intersection of Chenango St. and Erie-Lackawanna RR tracks, Binghamton, New York
- Coordinates: 42°6′15″N 75°54′29″W
- Area: 18 acres (7.3 ha)
- Built: 1901
- Architectural style: Late 19th And 20th Century Revivals, Renaissance, Romanesque
- NRHP reference No.: 86000488
- Added to NRHP: March 20, 1986
Location

Railroad Terminal Historic District is a national historic district in Binghamton in Broome County, New York. The district includes 19 contributing buildings. Four of the buildings were directly related to Binghamton's rail passenger and freight operations, including the passenger station. Five buildings were built as warehouses, and ten were built to house retail activities with residential or office uses on the upper floors. The buildings were built between 1876 and 1910, with a major addition to one of them completed in 1932. This Delaware, Lackawanna and Western Railroad passenger station, with its Italian Renaissance campanile, was built in 1901. For most years of passenger service to Binghamton, Delaware and Hudson Railway and Erie Railroad trains used a different station 150 yards away.

It was listed on the National Register of Historic Places in 1986.

== Destinations when the station was in use ==
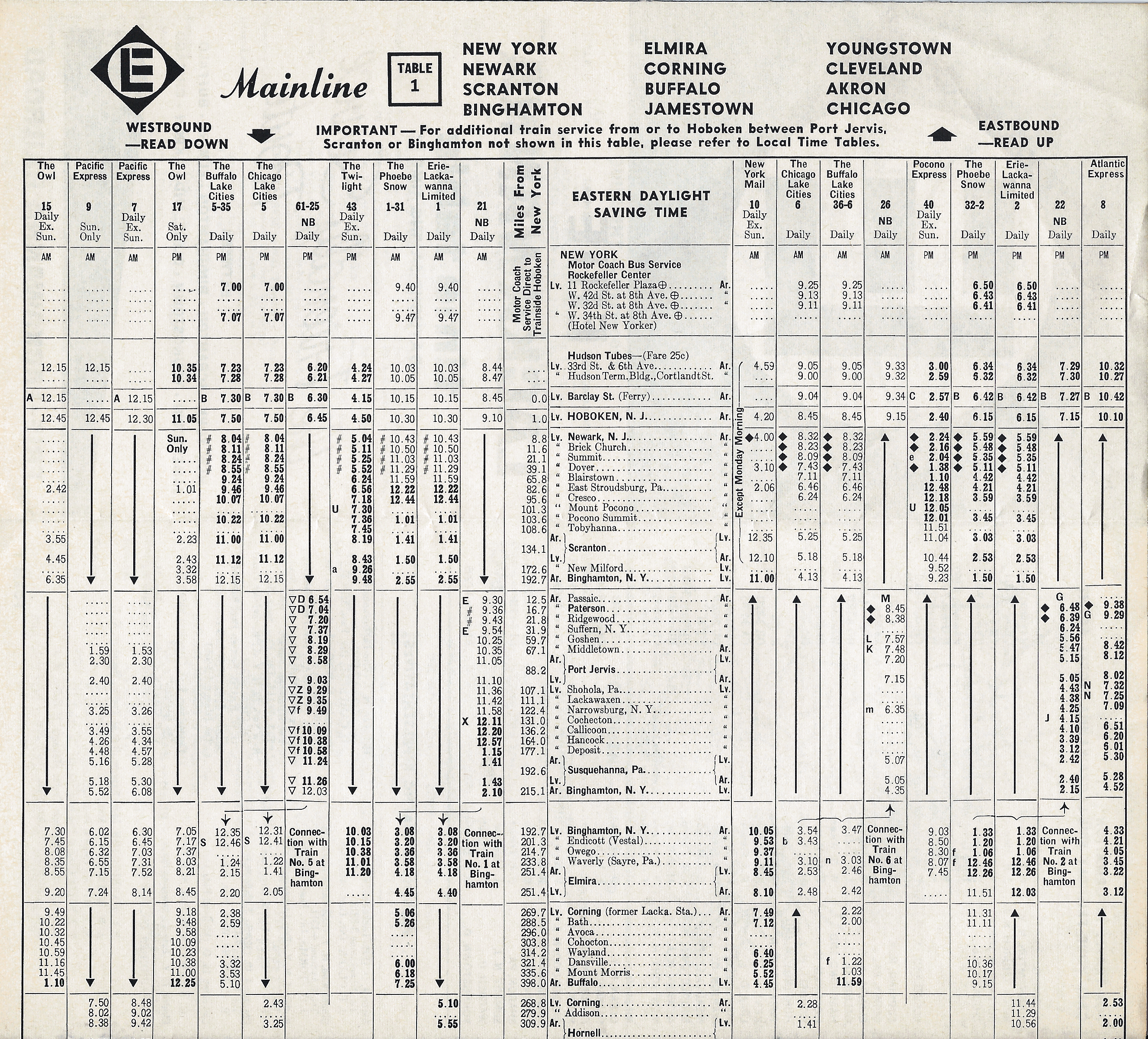
Erie Lackawanna Railroad Company Main Line 1961 Timetable documenting famous trains such as Phoebe Snow, Lake Cities, and Erie Lackawanna Limited making stops at Binghamton Station

From this location there were Lackawanna trains such as the Phoebe Snow and the overnight Owl to Buffalo, New York to the west and Hoboken to the east. The Interstate Express served Syracuse to the north and Allentown and Philadelphia to the south. Other Lackawanna trains also served Syracuse and Utica, New York to the north and Scranton, the Poconos and northern New Jersey to the south.

Erie Railroad trains joined the DL&W trains at the station in 1958. Trains such as the Lake Cities, the Erie Limited and the Atlantic Express/Pacific Express served Chicago to the west and Hoboken to the east. (Erie trains that year also stopped using the company's Pavonia Terminal in Jersey City.) The last long distance train was on January 6, 1970 when the Lake Cities stopped running.
