= Genesee Valley Regional Market Authority =

Coordinates: 43.0876°N 77.6133°W

Genesee Valley Regional Market Authority is a New York state Class C Public Authority created in 1950 to "avoid stressing the tax base". The Authority had a budget of $2.7 million in 2006-2007 with estimated surplus of $914K.

The Authority " ... serves as a centrally located food distribution center for a nine-county area in Western New York. The Market is located on 123 acres (0.50 km^{2}) in the Town of Henrietta, County of Monroe. There are 160 companies doing business on the property. The Market generates its revenue by renting buildings and land."

The Authority's website currently lists more than 50 companies and organizations leasing building space on Jefferson Avenue and Mushroom Boulevard locations. More than 50 also lease land controlled by the Authority, including major retail chains such as Office Depot, Holiday Inn, and Munro Muffler. The land leases are for locations on Clay Road, East Henrietta Road, Jefferson Road, and Mushroom Boulevard.

In accordance with the Authority By-Laws, the Directors of the Authority are selected from each of the covered counties and serve voluntarily, receiving nominal compensation for attendance at meetings.
