= Railroads in Syracuse, New York =

The Railroad industry in Syracuse, New York got its start in October 1831 when a convention held in the city marked one of the earliest moves to stimulate the era of railroad building which ultimately brought steam railroad service to New York State.

At the time of the convention, the oldest railroad in Onondaga County was in operation for two years. Out of the convention came the impetus which gave birth to the roads which consolidated in 1853 to form the New York Central Railroad.

== History ==
At the time of the first railroad convention in Syracuse in October 1831, the oldest railroad in the State, the pioneer Mohawk & Hudson Railroad had not reached the age of three. This was followed by the incorporation of the Auburn & Syracuse Railroad. At that time, Auburn, New York was a larger village than Syracuse therefore its name was mentioned first in the company title.

=== Auburn & Syracuse railroad ===
Syracuse railroad "subscribers" contributed $31,000 to the $400,000 stock authorized in the incorporation articles received on May 1, 1834. Among the 20 investors was Vivus W. Smith, who later was one of the founders of the Syracuse Journal.

The Auburn & Syracuse Railroad was opened on January 8, 1838, with horse-drawn trains. On June 4, 1839, the first locomotive owned by the line, the "Syracuse," traveled the wooden rails and pulled the first train by steam. By 1839, one of the trains achieved the 26 miles (42 km) run in 58 minutes. A year later, in 1840, the event was reported in the Western State Journal. Known as the Auburn road the company erected a new depot between Salina and Clinton streets in late 1838.

The depot was replaced that next summer in 1839 when the depot of the Syracuse and Utica Railroad was ready for use. The depot of the Auburn road was not known for either beauty or finish, presenting a "striking contrast to its majestic neighbor across the street."

Only after the advent of the steam railroad did the train finally arrive in Syracuse. Originally, a mill pond on the site of the present State Armory in West Jefferson Street, blocked the right of way. It was not until a trestle was built across the pond, that passengers were no longer "forced to find other means of getting into the village of Syracuse from a temporary station at Geddes. Work on the trestle was completed in early 1839 as well as construction of a new railroad station.

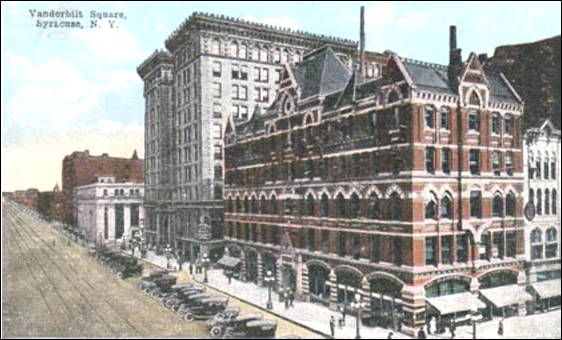
Vanderbilt Square in Syracuse, New York about 1920

=== Vanderbilt square ===
Vanderbilt was the first railroad station in Syracuse, opening in early 1839 Railroads were such a dominant form of transportation in those days, the square was perpetually coated with soot from the locomotives running down tracks in the middle of the street. The new station had doors at either end which were closed after the arrival and departure of the trains.

From 1839 on, Syracuse life for many years revolved around Vanderbilt Square, the magnet was the railroad station, and the hostelries that grew up around it. In the old station Henry Clay was welcomed on his visit to the New York State Fair in 1849. Daniel Webster, General Winfield Scott, Louis Kossuth, John Brown, Stephen A. Douglas, and other notables were greeted there.

=== Syracuse & Utica railroad ===
A second railroad was organized along a route from Syracuse to Utica. The route went through Oneida and Rome, a distance of 53 miles (85 km). On July 1, 1837, the village of Syracuse gave consent to a right of way along Washington Street for the railroad. The station in Vanderbilt Square was used by this railroad as well as the Auburn & Syracuse Railroad.

John Wilkinson, first postmaster of the village of Syracuse, who had given the village its name from the title of a poem, was president of the Syracuse & Utica Railroad. Vivus Smith served as the first secretary. As a result of their efforts, the railroad was headquartered in Syracuse instead of Utica, providing the village with an important industry.

Daniel Elliott was the architect and builder of the Syracuse and Utica Railroad depot which was a "striking exhibition of architectural skill and beauty." The depot was occasionally used for political or village meetings and public addresses. Noted characters were frequently received there including Martin Van Buren, Henry Clay and Gerrit Smith. At first, the building served its purpose very well, but soon became too cramped for convenience and the offices were "one by one removed to other quarters near by," where they remained until a new depot was constructed on Franklin Street.

Wilkinson, as president, ordered the construction of the first flat car for the line after passengers complained they needed a car in which they could carry purchases made in Syracuse back to Utica. This was the first "so-called" freight car in the nation, the forerunner of the modern freight business.

The railroad celebrated its first public run on July 4, 1839. The company installed their tracks along Washington Street where the New York Central Railroad retained the right-of-way.

=== Syracuse & Utica Direct railroad ===
In 1852, a rival company to the Syracuse & Utica Railroad, called the Syracuse & Utica Direct Railroad, threatened to build a line from Syracuse to Utica by a more direct route, by way of Vernon, New York. This reduced the total travel time from four hours to three and one-half hours.

It was at this time that the Syracuse & Utica Railroad decided to "double track its line through Washington Street."

=== Syracuse Stone railroad ===
The Syracuse Stone Railroad Company connected the city with the Onondaga stone quarries. The small railroad connected the Auburn & Syracuse Railroad from Geddes into the city proper and the depot at Vanderbilt Square.

=== Railroad competition ===
The Oswego & Syracuse began business in 1848.

=== Syracuse & Binghamton railroad ===
The Syracuse & Binghamton Railroad, opened in 1854, a year after original New York Central Railroad consolidation. It linked to the earlier Syracuse & Oswego Railroad line shortly after both came under control of the Delaware, Lackawanna and Western Railroad in 1870. This was accomplished despite difficulties caused by the use of wide gauge rails by one railroad and standard gauge by the other.

=== Direct railway ===
The Direct Railway Company was incorporated in 1848 and was designed as a direct route between Syracuse and Rochester and reduced the total trip by 23 miles (37 km) as opposed to the Auburn & Rochester Railroad which was designed to provide local service to villages along the way, therefore a less direct route.

=== Rochester & Syracuse railroad ===
The Rochester & Syracuse Railroad Company was formed in 1853 and were granted authorization to construct a direct route line and acquire all rights of the Direct Railway Company. The railroad opened for business in June 1853, two months before the formation of the New York Central Railroad.

=== Salina street ===
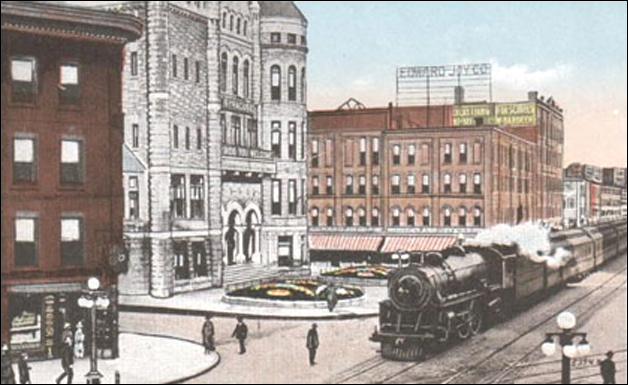
Empire State Express about 1900

The first street railway was built in Salina street in 1859, exposing Syracuse to tourists. Travelers caught "intimate glimpses" of Syracuse, its people, stores and houses as the trains slowed on their way through town.

On February 18, 1861, Abraham Lincoln, on the way to his inauguration, bowed from a coach platform and on April 26, 1865, his funeral train stopped for 30 minutes.

The Oakwood and Geddes horse car lines were built in 1863.

=== New York central ===
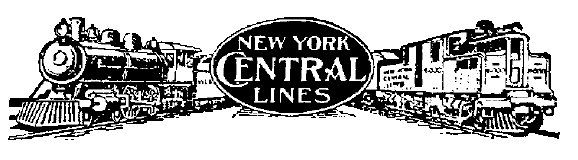
New York Central Railroad – 1908

The merger of seven railroads in Central New York was foreshadowed as early as 1842 when completion of a line between Buffalo and Attica made it possible to travel between Buffalo and Albany, with a change necessary only at Rochester.

On January 31, 1843, the seven railroad companies operating along the route met in Albany and agreed to run two "through" trains daily between the Hudson River and Lake Erie terminals. The trip took 25 hours and cost $11.50 for first class. Average speed on the 326 miles (525 km) run was 13 miles per hour (21 km/h).

Some consolidation of these roads had been effected by April 2, 1853, when the New York State Legislature passed an act authorizing the merger of any or all the ten railroads organized on routes between the Hudson River region and the Great Lakes. By July 7, 1853, an agreement had been reached by the "ready" railroad directors. This was the beginning of the growth of the New York Central Railroad which eventually spread westward from Buffalo and moved to New York City by the Hudson River Line.

The old New York Central Railroad station was demolished on Sunday in February, 1870 and a new New York Central Railroad depot was built on Franklin and West Fayette streets at the edge of Armory Square which was in use until 1895 when a third station was constructed. The third depot was demolished in 1936.

=== Additional lines ===
During the 1870s, two new railroads were established including the Syracuse, Chenango & New York Railroad, through the Chenango Valley, and the Syracuse & Northern, to Watertown, New York. Both railroads later merged with the New York Central Railroad.

=== West Shore railroad ===
The West Shore Railroad opened a route to New York City in 1848. A "rate war" led to the demise of the road, which was leased to the New York Central Railroad.

West Shore secured its franchise in Syracuse in 1881, and was opened on October 1, 1883

The Syracuse & Utica Railroad made its first arrival in 1889. The locomotive named Syracuse "drew the first train out of the old station on June 4, 1889, over the Auburn road."

== See also ==
- OnTrack
