= Armory Square =

- Armory Square Historic District
- U.S. National Register of Historic Places
- U.S. Historic district
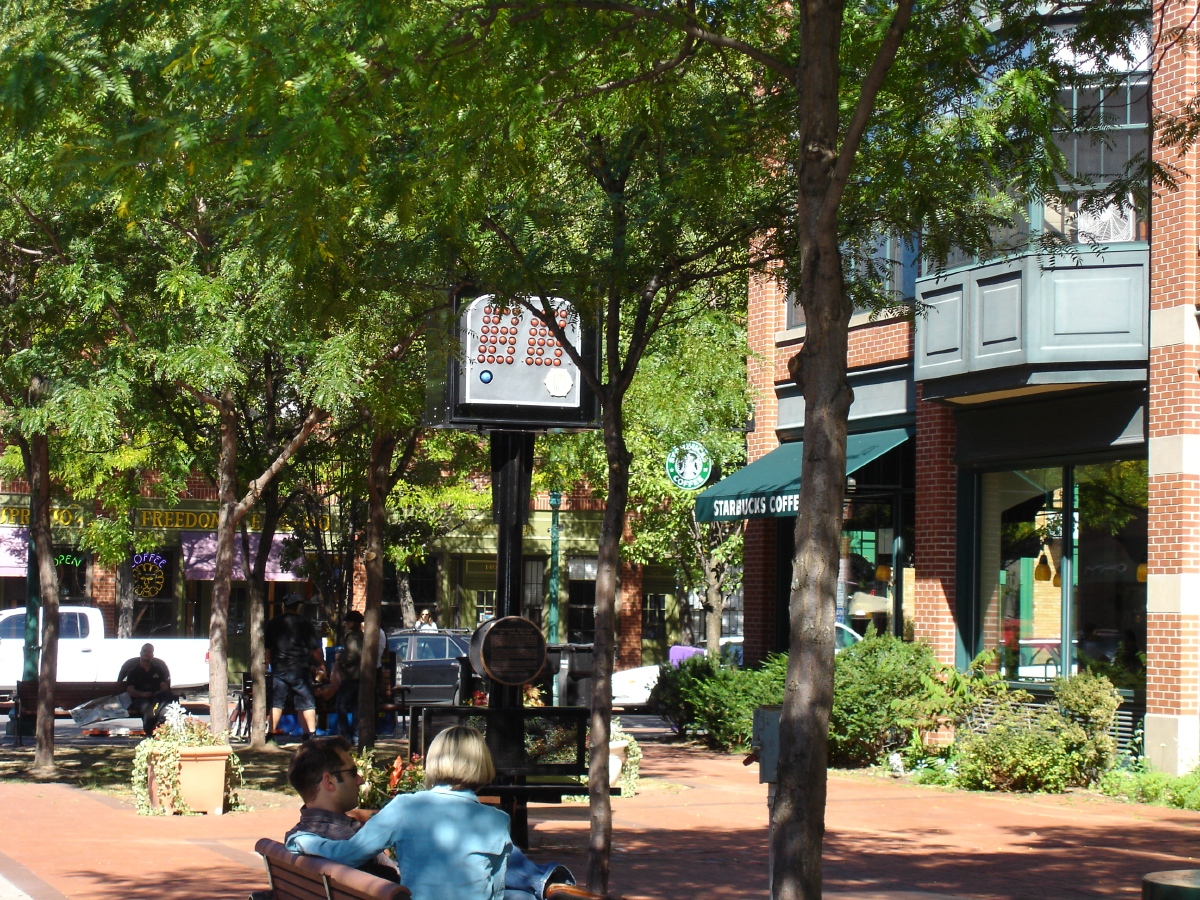
- The Shot Clock Monument at Armory Square

- Location within New York Location within the United States
- Location: S. Clinton, S. Franklin, Walton, W. Fayette, and W. Jefferson Sts., Syracuse, New York
- Coordinates: 43°2′49″N 76°9′18″W
- Built: 1870
- Architectural style: Moderne, Late Victorian
- NRHP reference No.: 84002816
- Added to NRHP: September 7, 1984

Armory Square is a small neighborhood on the west side of Downtown Syracuse, New York. It began life as a busy commercial and industrial area just to the west of the central city. After World War II, Syracuse's central city became less and less populated as more housing and business facilities were built in the suburbs. In the 1980s, plans were first made to transform the languishing district into a small shopping/arts/nightlife district surrounding the former Syracuse Armory. These plans came to fruition during the 1990s, when new stores and restaurants opened, and several new buildings were constructed in a compatible style to the middle and late 1800s and early 1900s architecture dominating the district.

== Current day ==
Today, Armory Square is the home of some of Syracuse's best restaurants, multiple coffeehouses, a radio station company, and dozens of small shops selling everything from musical instruments to used records to women's clothing. It is also the location of several bars and nightclubs, Armory Massage Therapy, a newly restored upscale hotel and two tattoo parlors. A number of professional firms are also located in Armory Square, including Eric Mower and Associates, O'Brien & Gere, and the Sugarman Law Firm. The area is popular with students from Syracuse University and Le Moyne College.

Its borders are generally considered to be the circular road around the armory (Jefferson Street) to the south, Onondaga Creek to the west, Washington Street to the north, and Clinton Street to the east.

Armory Square is also home to the Shot Clock Monument, which includes a 24-second shot clock whose invention, here, was crucial to the successful development of basketball as a major sport.

A paved multi-use trail, the Onondaga Creekwalk, connects the neighborhood with Onondaga Lake.

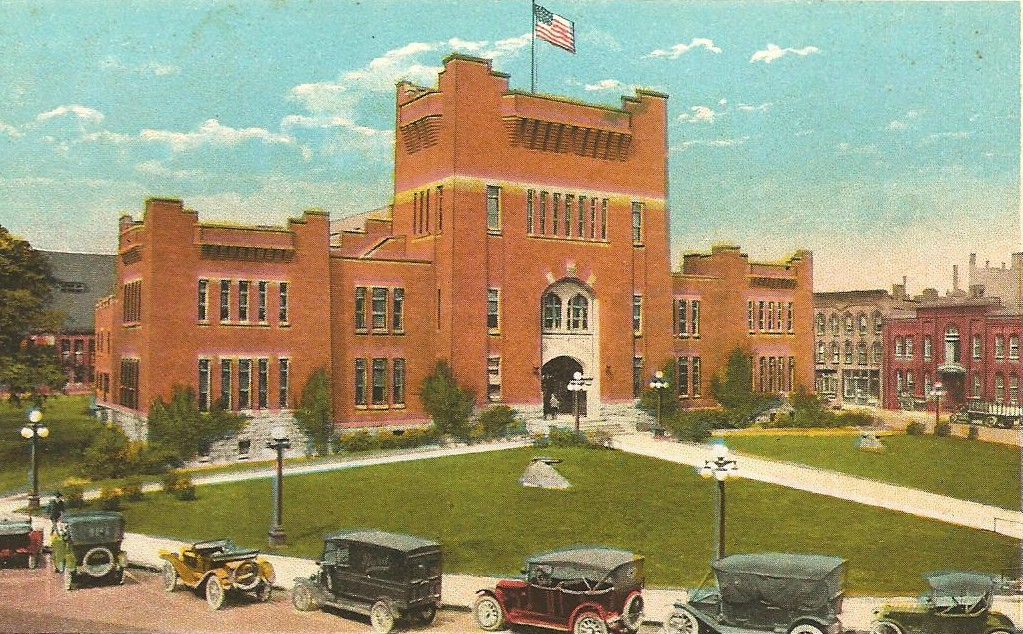
Vintage postcard of the Armory

== Armory Square Historic District ==
Forty-six industrial and commercial buildings make up the Armory Square Historic District. West Fayette Street is the northern boundary of the district, the rear property lines of the buildings on South Clinton Street the eastern boundary. The southern boundary is a raised railroad track, while the western boundary includes the buildings on Walton Street. The buildings in the district include the Armory, a former Lackawanna Railroad passenger station (1941), hotels, warehouses and commercial buildings. The district was added to the National Register of Historic Places in 1984.

=== Contributing properties ===
| | Landmark name | Image | Date Built | Style | Location | Description |
|---|---|---|---|---|---|---|
| 1 | | | 1874 | | 307-09 South Clinton Street | 5 stories; brick commercial building; segmental window arches; fifth story added 1885 |
| 2 | | | 1874 | | 311-13 South Clinton Street | 4 stories; brick commercial building; recessed windows; fancy cornice |
| 3 | Donohue Building (portion) | | c. 1885 | Queen Anne | 312-16 South Clinton Street | 4 stories; red brick; decorative sandstone, granite and terra cotta elements |
| 4 | Butler Block | | 1893 | Romanesque | 317-21 South Clinton Street | 5 stories; red brick; broad arches; cast-iron columns |
| 5 | Neal and Hyde Block (portion) | | c. 1887 | Queen Anne-Romanesque | 318-22 South Clinton Street | 5 stories; brick warehouse; limestone trim; architect Asa Merrick |
| 6 | Clinton Building | | 1876 | | 400-08 South Clinton Street | 3 stories; brick; 1920s alterations |
| 7 | Onondaga Music Building | | 1914 | | 410-416 South Clinton Street | 4 stories; buff brick commercial building |
| 8 | | | 1874 | | 415-17 South Clinton Street | 4 stories; patterned brick commercial building; |
| 9 | Loew Building | South Salina Street entrance | 1928 | | 423-31 South Clinton Street | 2 stories on S. Clinton St.; 8 stories on S. Salina St.; large theater, also known as Loews State Theater or the Landmark Theatre; individually listed on the National Register of Historic Places in 1977 |
| 10 | Delaware, Lackawanna, and Western Passenger Station | | 1941 | Art Moderne | 500 South Clinton Street | 2 stories; buff brick; arched windows |
| 11 | | | c. 1874 | | 306 South Franklin Street | 2 stories; brick; arched windows |
| 12 | | | c. 1880s | | 308-10 South Franklin Street | 3 stories; brick; original storefront |
| 13 | | | c. 1887 | | 309-15 South Franklin Street | 4 stories; brick; granite piers |
| 14 | | | c. 1900 | | 317-21 South Franklin Street | 2 stories; brick; originally carriage makers; 1940 became garage; 1983 offices |
| 15 | Hall & McChesney Building | | c. 1892/1906 | | 402-10 South Franklin Street | 4 stories; brick; warehouse |
| 16 | Bentley & Settle Warehouse | | c. 1894-5 | | 120-24 Walton Street | 6 stories; brick; intact loading dock |
| 17 | | | c. 1885 | | 128 Walton Street | 2 stories; yellow brick; second floor loading door |
| 18 | | | c. 1890s | | 134 Walton Street | 2 stories; brick; plate glass windows |
| 19 | | | c. 1890s | | 136 Walton Street | 2 stories; brick; paired windows |
| 20 | Gray Brothers Shoe Factory | | 1873 | | 200-02 Walton Street | 4 stories; brick walls and window hoods |
| 21 | | | c. 1930 | | 204-10 Walton Street | 2 stories; factory; brick |
| 22 | | | c. 1872 | | 215-19 Walton Street | 3 stories; brick; arched windows |
| 23 | | | c. 1870s-1880s | | 216 Walton Street | 2 stories; ornamental brick |
| 24 | | | c. 1902 | | 221-23 Walton Street | 3 stories; commercial building; brick piers |
| 25 | | | c. 1910 | Renaissance | 113-17 West Fayette Street | 5 stories; brick |
| 26 | Kirk Block | | c. 1869 | | 127-29 West Fayette Street | 4 stories; brick; commercial building |
| 27 | | | c. 1871 | | 215-17 West Fayette Street | 4 stories; brick; commercial building; 1930s modern facade |
| 28 | Tallman Block | | c. 1871 | Italianate | 219-25 West Fayette Street | 3 stories; brick; commercial building; rear entrance on Walton Street; architect Archimedes Russell |
| 29 | Piper-Phillips Block | | c. 1872 | Italianate | 227-37 West Fayette Street | 3 stories; brick; commercial building; original storefronts |
| 30 | Seubert & Warner Building | | c. 1875 | Romanesque | 239-41 West Fayette Street | 3 stories; brick; commercial building; rear entrance on Walton Street; architect Charles Colton |
| 31 | | | c. 1895 | Italianate | 227-37 West Fayette Street | 3 stories; brick with stone trim; commercial building; prism glass in storefronts |
| 32 | Hogan Block | | c. 1892 | Romanesque | 247-59 West Fayette Street | 5 stories; brick with limestone trim; factory building; prism panels in storefronts |
| 33 | Crown Hotel | | c. 1876 | Italianate | 301-27 West Fayette Street | 3 stories; brick; commercial building |
| 34 | | | c. 1872 | | 309-11 West Fayette Street | 3 stories; brick; commercial building |
| 35 | | | c. 1873 | | 313-17 West Fayette Street | 2 stories; brick; commercial building; molded keystones |
| 36 | Stag Hotel | | 1869 | | 321 West Fayette Street | 3 stories; brick; intact storefront |
| 37 | | | 1875 | | 329-31 West Fayette Street | 4 stories; brick; warehouse; rear entrance on Walton Street |
| 38 | Jefferson Clinton Hotel | | 1927 | | 227-37 West Jefferson Street | 10 stories; brick; stone facade first two floors; architect Gustavas A. Young |
| 39 | New York State Armory | | 1907/1932 | | West Jefferson Street | Housed Army National Guard; brick and limestone; central drill hall added in 1932; Currently houses the Milton J. Rubenstein Museum of Science and Technology |
