= Syracuse and Binghamton Railroad =

Railroad in New York, US (1851–1869)

Overview
- Headquarters: New York, New York
- Locale: Geddes to Binghamton, New York
- Dates of operation: 1851–1869
- Successor: Delaware, Lackawanna and Western Railroad

Technical
- Track gauge: 4 ft 8 1/2 in (1,435 mm) standard gauge

The Syracuse and Binghamton Railroad was established on August 18, 1851, and opened for business on October 18, 1854. The road merged in 1856 into Syracuse and Southern Railroad which was renamed to Syracuse, Binghamton and New York Railroad when the company reorganized after foreclosure in 1857.

The road linked to the earlier Oswego and Syracuse Railroad line shortly after both came under control of the Delaware, Lackawanna and Western Railroad (DL&WRR) in 1869. This was accomplished despite difficulties caused by the use of wide gauge rails by one railroad and standard gauge by the other.

== History ==
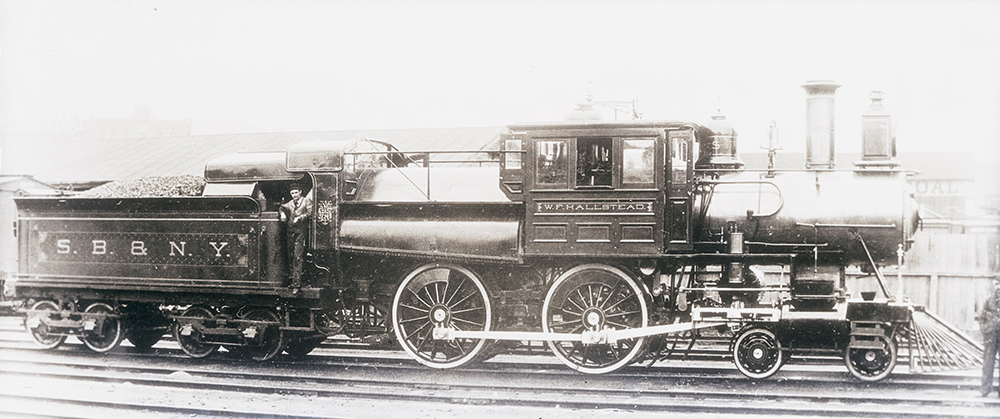
Syracuse, Binghamton and New York, Engine 5, date unknown

The Syracuse and Binghamton Railroad ran from Geddes to Binghamton for a total distance of 81 miles (130 km). The company was chartered as the Syracuse and Binghamton Railroad Company on August 18, 1851, to bring coal from Pennsylvania so it could be used as fuel for Syracuse, New York's salt industry. In 1853, the company was consolidated with the Oswego and Syracuse Railroad after the act was authorized by the New York State Legislature. The full length was opened for business on October 18, 1854. The company foreclosed, and the Syracuse and Binghamton's original line was sold to a new company, the Syracuse and Southern Railroad, in 1856, which was renamed to Syracuse, Binghamton and New York Railroad on April 30, 1857. When the Oswego and Syracuse was restored as an independent railroad is unclear.

In 1862, the general offices were located in Washington Block on South Salina Street and the passenger depot was on the corner of West Onondaga and Clinton streets. The company had a machine shop West of Clinton Street near the "Regimental" Armory.

By 1879, the Syracuse passenger depot for the railroad was located on West Jefferson Street opposite Armory Park and the freight office was on Clinton Street near West Onondaga Street. The superintendent of the Syracuse operation was W. K. Niver and the freight agent was A. H. Schwarz and ticket agent was J. H. Schwarz.

=== Delaware, Lackawanna and Western railroad ===
The company was taken over by Delaware, Lackawanna and Western Railroad in 1869.

By December 1888, the company's rolling stock consisted of 20 locomotive engines, 9 passenger, baggage and mail cars, 594 freight, including box and platform, 75 service cars and 9 cabooses. The company had capital stock outstanding of $2,500,000 and funded debt of $1,966,000 due in 1906.

As a result of the DL&WR buying the Syracuse, Binghamton and New York Railroad in 1869, and leasing the Oswego and Syracuse Railroad on February 13, 1869, the company gained a branch from Binghamton north and northwest via Syracuse to Oswego, a port on Lake Ontario.

=== Company management ===
By December 1888, directors of the company included Samuel Sloan, Percy R. Pyne, George Bliss, Uriel A. Murdock, Frederick H. Gibbens, Fred F. Chambers, Benjamin G. Clark, Moses Taylor Pyne, Edgar S. Auchinclose, E. R. Holden and W. S. Sloan, all of New York City. Additionally, E. F. Holden of Syracuse and Arthur D. Chambers of Orange, New Jersey. Samuel Sloan was president of the company, Fred F. Chambers was secretary and Frederick H. Gibbens was treasurer. The company was headquartered at 26 Exchange Place in New York City.

=== Financial ===
In June 1920, the total value of the Syracuse, Binghamton and New York Railway franchise in Syracuse as determined by the New York State Tax Commission was $99,040, up from $98,106 in 1919.
