= List of named passenger trains of the United States (N–R) =

This article contains a list of named passenger trains in the United States, with names beginning N through R.

== N ==
Train Name	Railroad	Train Endpoints in a typical [year]	Operated
Namakagon	Omaha Road	Minneapolis, Minnesota–Ashland, Wisconsin	1939–1950
Nancy Hanks II	Central of Georgia	Atlanta, Georgia–Savannah, Georgia [1953]	1947–1971
Napa Valley Wine Train	Napa Valley Railroad	Napa, California–St. Helena, California [2016]	1989–present
Narragansett	Pennsylvania Railroad; New Haven Railroad	Philadelphia–Boston [1948]	1925–1957
Narragansett	Amtrak	New York, New York–Boston, Massachusetts [1972]	1971–1972; 1976; 1984–1994; 1997–1998
Nashville-Chicago Limited	Chicago and Eastern Illinois Railroad, Louisville and Nashville Railroad	Chicago, Illinois–Nashville, Tennessee–Jacksonville, Florida [1924]	1892–1903 (called Nashville and Chicago Limited); 1907–1913; 1919–1925
Nathan Hale	New Haven	New York, New York–Springfield, Massachusetts [1970]	1942–1971
Nathan Hale	Amtrak	Washington, DC–Springfield, Massachusetts [1985]	1984–1987
National Limited	Baltimore & Ohio	Jersey City, New Jersey–St. Louis, Missouri [1948]	1925–1971
National Limited	Amtrak	New York, New York–Kansas City, Missouri [1973]	1971–1979
National Limited	West Shore Railroad, Wabash Railroad	New York, New York–St. Louis, Missouri–Boston, Massachusetts–Chicago, Illinois [1904]	1904–1910
National Parks Special	Chicago & Northwestern, Union Pacific Railroad	Chicago, Illinois–Minneapolis–Saint Paul–Denver, Colorado–West Yellowstone, Montana [1940]	1940–1941; 1950–1955
Naugatuk	New York, New Haven, & Hartford	New York, New York–Winsted, Connecticut [1949]	1947–1953
Navajo	Santa Fe	Chicago, Illinois–Los Angeles, California [1934]	1915–1939
Nebraska Limited	Chicago Great Western	Minneapolis–Saint Paul–Omaha, Nebraska [1921]	1916–1952
Nebraska Limited	Chicago, Burlington & Quincy	Chicago, Illinois–Lincoln, Nebraska [1923]	1917; 1923–1928
Nebraska Zephyr	Chicago, Burlington & Quincy	Chicago, Illinois–Lincoln, Nebraska [1955]	1947–1971
Nebraska-Chicago Limited	Chicago, Burlington & Quincy	Chicago, Illinois–Omaha, Nebraska [1910]	1910–1916
Nellie Bly	Pennsylvania–Pennsylvania–Reading Seashore Lines	New York City–Atlantic City, New Jersey–Washington, D.C.–Atlantic City, New Jersey [1928]	1926–1942; 1950–1961
Neptune	New Haven	New York City–Woods Hole, Massachusetts [1940]	1937–1942; 1946–1958; 1960–1964
New England Express	New York Central and its affiliates	New York City–Boston–Chicago [1904]	1901–1909; 1921–1928
New England Express	Pennsylvania Railroad–New Haven Railroad	Pittsburgh–Boston [1925]	1920–1930
New England Express	Amtrak	New York City–Boston [1991]	1991–1995
New England Express	Boston and Maine, Canadian Pacific Railway	Boston, Massachusetts–Montreal, Quebec [1903]	1903–1910
New England Special	New York Central and its affiliates	Chicago, Illinois–Boston, Massachusetts [1913]	1901–1925
New England States	New York Central; Penn Central	Chicago, Illinois–Boston, Massachusetts [1942]	1938–1967
New England States Limited	Central Vermont Railway, Boston and Maine, New York, New Haven and Hartford Railroad	New York, New York–Montreal, Quebec–Boston, Massachusetts [1916]	1906–1917
New England Wolverine	New York Central	Chicago, Illinois–Boston, Massachusetts (endpoints varied by year) [1952]	1911–1933; 1942–1956
New England Zip	Amtrak	Boston–Washington, D.C. [1982]	1982–1983
New Englander	Central Vermont Railway, Boston and Maine, Canadian National Railway	Boston–Montreal, Quebec [1948]	1927–1953
New Englander	Pennsylvania Railroad; New Haven Railroad	Pittsburgh–Boston [1930]	1929–1961
New Englander	Amtrak	Boston–Philadelphia [1974]	1974–1975
New Mexico, Utah and California Express	Denver and Rio Grande Railroad	Denver, Colorado–Ogden, Utah [1901]	1901–1905
New Orleans and Chicago Limited	Illinois Central	Chicago, Illinois–New Orleans, Louisiana [1906]	1897–1910
New Orleans and Memphis Express	Illinois Central	St. Louis, Missouri–New Orleans, Louisiana [1914]	1912–1917
New Orleans and St. Louis Limited	Illinois Central	St. Louis, Missouri–New Orleans, Louisiana [1904]	1897–1910
New Orleans Limited	Queen and Crescent Route (Southern Railway from 1917)	Cincinnati, Ohio–New Orleans, Louisiana [1925]	1895; 1911–1919; 1923–1926
New Orleans Limited	Louisville and Nashville Railroad	Cincinnati, Ohio–New Orleans, Louisiana [1930]	1917–1936
New Orleans Limited	Illinois Central	Chicago, Illinois–St. Louis, Missouri–New Orleans, Louisiana [1922]	1913; 1917–1930
New Orleans Limited	Southern Pacific	Houston, Texas–New Orleans, Louisiana [1925]	1923–1934
New Orleans Special	Illinois Central	Chicago, Illinois–St. Louis, Missouri–New Orleans, Louisiana [1922]	1900–1930
New Orleans Special	Southern Railway	Cincinnati, Ohio–New Orleans, Louisiana (with through cars to other points) [1928]	1925–1930
New Orleans Special	Chicago and Eastern Illinois Railroad, Louisville and Nashville Railroad	Chicago, Illinois–New Orleans, Louisiana (with through cars to other points) [1916]	1902–1903; 1906–1931
New Orleans-Florida Express	Louisville and Nashville Railroad, Seaboard Air Line Railroad	New Orleans, Louisiana–Jacksonville, Florida [1948]	ca. 1930s–1949
New Orleans-Florida Limited	Louisville and Nashville Railroad, Seaboard Air Line Railroad	New Orleans, Louisiana–Jacksonville, Florida [1926]	1925–1931; 1937–1949
New Royal Palm	Southern Railway; Florida East Coast Railway, New York Central Railroad	Chicago, Illinois–Miami, Florida [1952]	1949–1955
New York and Atlanta Express	Pennsylvania Railroad, Southern Railway	New York, New York–Atlanta, Georgia [1903]	1901–1908
New York and Boston Express	New York Central and its affiliates	New York, New York–St. Louis, Missouri–Boston, Massachusetts–Chicago, Illinois [1904]	1899–1913
New York and Boston Special	Michigan Central and its affiliates	Chicago, Illinois–Boston, Massachusetts–New York, New York [1909]	1898–1910; 1918–1932
New York and Chicago Express	Lehigh Valley Railroad, Grand Trunk Western Railroad	New York City–Philadelphia–Chicago [1916]	1908–1916
New York and Florida Special	Pennsylvania Railroad, Richmond, Fredericksburg and Potomac Railroad, Atlantic Coast Line Railroad, Florida East Coast Railway	New York, New York–Key West, Florida	1888–1920
New York and Memphis Limited	Pennsylvania Railroad, Southern Railway	New York, New York–Memphis, Tennessee [1906]	1902–1909
New York and New England Express	New York Central and its affiliates	New York, New York–St. Louis, Missouri–Boston, Massachusetts–Chicago, Illinois [1904]	1901–1925
New York and New England Special	New York Central and its affiliates	New York, New York–St. Louis, Missouri–Boston, Massachusetts–Cincinnati, Ohio [1912]	1910–1930
New York and New Orleans Limited	Pennsylvania Railroad, Southern Railway, Atlanta and West Point Railroad	New York, New York–New Orleans, Louisiana [1910]	1907–1925
New York and Norfolk Express	Pennsylvania	New York, New York–Cape Charles, Virginia [1913]	1894–1917
New York and Philadelphia Day Express	Lehigh Valley Railroad, Reading Railroad	New York City–Philadelphia [1908]	1908–1916
New York and Philadelphia Express	Lehigh Valley Railroad, Grand Trunk Western Railroad	New York City–Philadelphia–Chicago, Illinois [1903]	1894–1916
New York and Washington Express	Pennsylvania	New York, New York–Washington, DC [1930]	1974-1905; 1909; 1913–1949
New York Central Limited	New York Central and its affiliates	New York, New York–Boston, Massachusetts–Chicago, Illinois [1913]	1896; 1910–1924
New York Clocker (group of trains)	Central Railroad of New Jersey	Allentown, Pennsylvania–Jersey City, New Jersey [1955]	1954–1963
New York Day Express	Pennsylvania	New York, New York–Pittsburgh, Pennsylvania [1915]	1906–1927
New York Day Express	Boston and Albany Railroad, New Haven Railroad	New York, New York–Boston, Massachusetts [1922]	1910; 1919–1931
New York Day Express	Delaware, Lackawanna and Western Railroad	New York, New York–Scranton, Pennsylvania	1919–1927; 1934
New York Executive	Amtrak	New York, New York–Washington, DC [1984]	1984–1986
New York Express	New York Central and its affiliates	New York, New York–Chicago, Illinois [1926]	1877–1894; 1901–1918; 1926–1928; 1933–1941
New York Express	Erie Railroad	Jersey City, New Jersey–Chicago, Illinois [1930]	1929–1933
New York Express	Boston and Albany Railroad, New Haven Railroad	New York, New York–Boston, Massachusetts [1940]	1882–1886; 1926–1946
New York Express	Pennsylvania	New York, New York–St. Louis, Missouri [1915]	1903–1928
New York Express	New York Central, Rutland Railroad	New York, New York–Montreal, Quebec [1916]	1913–1918
New York Express	Delaware, Lackawanna and Western Railroad	New York, New York–Buffalo, New York (with through cars to other New York destinations) [1920]	1919–1924; 1933–1936
New York Express	New York Central	North Adams, Massachusetts--New York, New York [1922]	1919–1932
New York Express	Long Island Rail Road	New York, New York–Montauk, New York [1940]	1929–1941; 1947–1949
New York Limited	Pennsylvania	New York, New York–Cincinnati, Ohio–St. Louis, Missouri [1904]	1904–1910
New York Limited	New York Central and its affiliates	New York, New York–Cleveland, Ohio–Chicago, Illinois–Cincinnati, Ohio [1924]	1910; 1921–1941
New York Limited	Delaware, Lackawanna and Western Railroad	New York, New York–Buffalo, New York [1920]	1919–1924
New York Limited	Pennsylvania	New York, New York–Atlantic City, New Jersey [1925]	1923–1931
New York Limited Express	Pennsylvania	New York, New York–Washington, D.C. [1901]	1874–1904
New York Mail	Delaware, Lackawanna and Western Railroad, New York, Chicago and St. Louis Railroad	Chicago, Illinois-New York City [1938]; Buffalo, New York-Hoboken, New Jersey [1958]	1937–1968
New York Mail	Pennsylvania	New York, New York–Pittsburgh, Pennsylvania [1915]	1913–1920
New York Night Express	Baltimore & Ohio Railroad; Central Railroad of New Jersey; Reading Railroad	Jersey City, New Jersey–Washington, D.C. [1940]	1938–1952
New York Scenic Express	Erie Railroad	Jersey City, New Jersey–Chicago, Illinois [1925]	1922–1928
New York Special	New York Central	New York, New York–Chicago, Illinois [1952]	1910–1967
New York Special	Erie Railroad	Jersey City, New Jersey–Akron, Ohio [1903]	1897–1915
New York State Express	New York Central and its affiliates	Boston, Massachusetts–Buffalo, New York [1930]	1927–1941
New York-Berkshire Express	New York Central	New York, New York–Boston, Massachusetts–Albany, New York [1943]	1942–1952
New York-Boston Express	Boston and Albany Railroad, New Haven Railroad	New York, New York–Boston, Massachusetts [1940]	1923–1952
New York-Chicago Special	Baltimore and Ohio Railroad	Jersey City, New Jersey–Chicago, Illinois [1925]	1919–1934
New York-Cincinnati-St. Louis Express	Baltimore and Ohio Railroad	Jersey City, New Jersey–St. Louis, Missouri [1915]	1913–1936
New York-Cincinnati-St. Louis Limited	Baltimore and Ohio Railroad	Jersey City, New Jersey–St. Louis, Missouri [1915]	1913–1936
New York-Cincinnati-St. Louis Special	Baltimore and Ohio Railroad	Jersey City, New Jersey–St. Louis, Missouri [1928]	1925–1930
New York-Cleveland Express	Erie Railroad	Jersey City, New Jersey–Cleveland, Missouri [1925]	1922–1927
New York-Florida Limited	Pennsylvania Railroad, Richmond, Fredericksburg and Potomac Railroad, Seaboard Air Line Railroad	New York, New York–Miami, Florida–St. Petersburg, Florida [1930]	1927–1941
New York-Pittsburgh-Chicago Express	Baltimore and Ohio Railroad	Jersey City, New Jersey–Chicago, Illinois [1932]	1913–1914; 1931–1934; 1939–1944
New York-Richmond Express	Pennsylvania Railroad, Richmond, Fredericksburg and Potomac Railroad	New York, New York–Richmond, Virginia [1914]	1912–1918
New York-Washington-Atlanta-New Orleans Express	Pennsylvania, Southern Railway, Atlanta and West Point Railroad, Louisville and Nashville Railroad	New York, New York–New Orleans, Louisiana [1934]	1920–1943
New York-Washington-New Orleans Express	Pennsylvania, Southern Railway	New York, New York–New Orleans, Louisiana [1934]	1931–1935
New York, Atlanta and New Orleans Limited	Pennsylvania, Southern Railway	New York, New York–New Orleans, Louisiana [1910]	1910–1915
New York, Boston and Chicago Special	New York Central and its affiliates	New York, New York–Boston, Massachusetts–Chicago, Illinois–Cincinnati, Ohio [1912]	1895–1900; 1912–1916
New York, Pittsburgh and Chicago Limited	Baltimore and Ohio Railroad	Jersey City, New Jersey–Chicago, Illinois [1911]	1911–1916
New Yorker	Amtrak	New York, New York–Washington, DC [1991]	1973–1976; 1980–1982; 1991–1998
New Yorker	Lackawanna Railroad; Nickel Plate	Chicago, Illinois–Hoboken, New Jersey [1938]	1936–1961
New Yorker	Pennsylvania	New York, New York–Chicago, Illinois (with sections to other cities) [1937]	1916–1927; 1930–1947
New Yorker	New York Central	New York, New York–Chicago, Illinois [1911]	1904–1928
New Yorker	Pennsylvania, Southern Railway	New York, New York–Atlanta, Georgia [1948]	1948–1953
New Yorker	New Haven	New York, New York–Boston, Massachusetts [1940]	1925–1971
New Yorker	Lehigh Valley Railroad, Grand Trunk Western Railroad	New York, New York–Chicago, Illinois [1928]	1925–1932
New Yorker	Detroit and Mackinac Railway	Detroit, Michigan–Alpena, Michigan [1938]	1936–1946
Newarker	Central Railroad of New Jersey	New York, New York–Bay Head, New Jersey [1942]	1942–1949
Newspaper Special	Pennsylvania	New York, New York–Williamsport, Pennsylvania [1920]	1919–1923
Niagara	New York Central	Chicago, Illinois–Buffalo, New York, via Detroit, Michigan [1948]	1926–1949
Niagara-Canadian	New York Central, Canadian Pacific Railway	Chicago, Illinois–Buffalo, New York and Toronto, Ontario, via Detroit, Michigan [1948]	1942–1946
Niagara	Pennsylvania	Philadelphia–Niagara Falls, New York [1922]	1920–1932
Niagara Falls and Eastern Express	Michigan Central	Chicago–Boston–New York City [1906]	1906–1934
Niagara Rainbow	Amtrak	New York, New York–Detroit, Michigan [1976] New York, New York–Albany, New York–Niagara Falls, Ontario–Toronto, Ontario [1994]	1974–1976 as the Empire State Express; 1976–1979; 1994–1995
Nickel Plate Limited	Delaware, Lackawanna and Western Railroad, New York, Chicago and St. Louis Railroad	New York, New York–Chicago, Illinois [1930]	1929–1954
Nicollete	Amtrak	Chicago, Illinois–Milwaukee, Wisconsin [1980]	1980–1989
Nieuw Amsterdam	Amtrak	New York, New York–Albany, New York [1991]	1991; 1995
Night Cap	Amtrak	New York, New York–Washington, DC [1971]	1971–1975
Night Cape Codder	New Haven	New York, New York–Woods Hole, Massachusetts [1940]	1937–1941; 1948–1958
Night Diamond	Illinois Central	Chicago, Illinois–St. Louis, Missouri [1950]	1947–1958
Night Express	Baltimore and Ohio Railroad; Chesapeake and Ohio Railway	Detroit, Michigan–Cincinnati, Ohio [1966]	1960–1967
Night Express	Central Vermont, Boston and Maine	Boston, Massachusetts–Montreal, Quebec [1916]	1911–1918
Night Express	Chicago, Indianapolis & Louisville	Chicago, Illinois–Cincinnati, Ohio [1921]	1921–1922
Night Express	Cleveland, Cincinnati, Chicago and St. Louis Railway	Peoria, Illinois–Indianapolis, Indiana [1918]	1915–1941
Night Express	Cleveland, Cincinnati, Chicago and St. Louis Railway	Chicago, Illinois–Cincinnati, Ohio [1923]	1923–1930
Night Express	Grand Rapids & Indiana	Chicago, Illinois–Grand Rapids, Michigan [1904]	1904–1918
Night Express	Lake Shore and Michigan Southern Railway	Chicago, Illinois–Cleveland, Ohio [1903]	1901–1914
Night Express	Milwaukee Road Railroad	Chicago, Illinois–Minneapolis–Saint Paul [1905]	1883–1886; 1904–1910
Night Express	New Haven	New York, New York–Boston, Massachusetts [1922]	1881–1909; 1919–1934
Night Express	New York Central, Rutland Railroad, Canadian Pacific Railway	New York, New York–Montreal, QC (with through cars to Ottawa, ON) [1903]	1900–1912
Night Express	Northern Pacific Railway	Minneapolis–Saint Paul–Duluth, Minnesota [1901]	1901–1905
Night Express	Pere Marquette	Chicago, Illinois–Traverse City, Michigan and Muskegon, Michigan [1930]	1920–1946
Night Express	Texas and Pacific Railway, Missouri Pacific Railroad	St. Louis, Missouri–Fort Worth, Texas (with through cars to other destinations) [1916]	1900–1918
Night Hawk	Chicago and Alton, Chicago, Burlington and Quincy Railroad; Gulf, Mobile and Ohio Railroad from 1947	St. Louis, Missouri–Kansas City, Missouri [1948]	1906–1949
Night Owl	Amtrak	Washington, DC–Boston, Massachusetts [1980]	1972; 1997
Night Special	New York Central	Cincinnati, Ohio-Cleveland, Ohio– [1955]	1953–1967
Night White Mountains	New Haven, Boston and Maine	New York, New York–Bretton Woods, New Hampshire [1952]	1926–1940; 1950–1955
Nightingale	Chicago and Alton	Chicago, Illinois–Kansas City, Missouri [1911]	1909–1918
Nightingale	Chicago & Northwestern	Omaha, Nebraska–Minneapolis–Saint Paul [1952]	1931–1956
Noon Daylight	Southern Pacific	Los Angeles, California–San Francisco, California [1941]	1940–1941; 1947–1949
Noon Flyer	Grand Rapids & Indiana	Chicago, Illinois–Grand Rapids, Michigan [1912]	1904–1918
North Adams and Pittsfield Express	New York Central	New York, New York–North Adams, Massachusetts [1915]	1914–1921
North Adams Express	New York Central	New York, New York–North Adams, Massachusetts [1908]	1907–1914
North Adams Special	New York Central	New York, New York–North Adams, Massachusetts [1908]	1902–1914
North American	Chicago & Northwestern	Chicago, Illinois–Minneapolis–Saint Paul (several different endpoints over the years) [1916]	1916–1959
North Coast Hiawatha	Amtrak	Chicago, Illinois–Seattle, Washington [1973]	1971–1979
North Coast Limited	Northern Pacific, Chicago, Burlington and Quincy Railroad	Chicago, Illinois–Seattle, Washington–Tacoma, Washington [1948]	1900–1971
North Michigan Special	Michigan Central Railroad, Pennsylvania Railroad	Chicago, Illinois–Mackinaw City, Michigan [1922]	1918–1930
North Penn	Reading Railroad	Philadelphia–Bethlehem, Pennsylvania [1963]	1961–1968
North Shore Limited	New York Central	New York City–Chicago; Toronto, Ontario-Chicago [1948]	1884–1897; 1902–1905; 1921–1963
North Star	Amtrak	Chicago–Duluth, Minnesota [1978]	1978–1986
North Star	New York Central	New York, New York–Toronto, Ontario-Cleveland, Ohio–Lake Placid, New York [1952]	1947–1962
North Star	Pennsylvania, Michigan Central Railroad	Chicago, Illinois–Mackinaw City, Michigan [1930]	1930–1932
North Star Limited	Illinois Central Railroad, Minneapolis and St. Louis Railway	Chicago, Illinois–Minneapolis–Saint Paul [1912]	1903–1918
North Star Limited	Wabash Railroad, Minneapolis and St. Louis Railway	St. Louis, Missouri–Minneapolis–Saint Paul [1912]	1907–1918
North Texas Limited	Texas and Pacific Railway, Missouri Pacific Railroad	St. Louis, Missouri–Fort Worth, Texas (with though cars to other destinations) [1916]	1914–1918
North Texas Mail	Santa Fe	Dallas, Texas–Cleburne, Texas [1906]	1906–1910
North Western Fast Mail	Chicago & Northwestern	Chicago, Illinois–Minneapolis–Saint Paul [1932]	1932–1937
North Western Limited	Chicago & Northwestern	Chicago, Illinois–Minneapolis–Saint Paul [1914]	1914–1958
North Western Mail	Chicago & Northwestern	Chicago, Illinois–Minneapolis–Saint Paul [1914]	1909–1933
North Wind	Boston and Maine, New Haven, Central Vermont Railway, Canadian National Railway	New York, New York–Montreal, Quebec [1955]	1950–1955
North Woods Fisherman	Chicago & Northwestern	Chicago, Illinois–Ashland, Wisconsin [1960]	1958–1963
North Woods Hiawatha	Milwaukee Road	Chicago, Illinois–Minocqua, Wisconsin	?
Northeast Regional (group of trains)	Amtrak	various destinations in the Northeast	-present
Northeastern Limited	Illinois Central	Shreveport, Louisiana–Meridian, Mississippi [1935]	1934–1967; westbound counterpart is the Southwestern Limited
Northern and Western Express	New York Central	New York, New York–Ogdensburg, New York–Watertown, New York [1910]	1908–1912
Northern Arrow	Pennsylvania	Cincinnati, Ohio–Mackinaw City, Michigan [1935]	1935–1942; 1946–1961
Northern Express	New York Central, Delaware and Hudson Railway, Central Vermont Railway	New York, New York–Montreal, Quebec [1892]	1890–1901
Northern Express	Pennsylvania	Washington, DC–Philadelphia–Erie, Pennsylvania (several different endpoints over the years; terminus shifted from Erie to Buffalo, NY in latter years) [1952]	1892–1968
Northern Express	Illinois Central	New Orleans, Louisiana–Chicago, Illinois [1948]	1922–1931; 1943–1952
Northern Michigan Express	Detroit and Mackinac Railway	Detroit, Michigan–Cheboygan, Michigan [1933]	1919–1935
Northern Michigan Special	Milwaukee Road	Chicago, Illinois–Calumet, Michigan [1915]	1913–1921
Northern New York Express	New York Central	New York, New York–Ogdensburg, New York–Oswego, New York [1902]	1902–1907
Northern Pacific Express	Northern Pacific, Chicago, Burlington and Quincy Railroad	Chicago, Illinois–Seattle, Washington–Portland, Oregon [1911]	1910–1920
Northerner	New York Central	Detroit, Michigan–Mackinaw City, Michigan [1952]	1952–1962
Northland Express	Pennsylvania	Cincinnati, Ohio–Mackinaw City, Michigan (in some years just called 'Northland' [1924]	1901–1903; 1923–1935
Northwest Express	Union Pacific	Salt Lake City, Utah–Portland, Oregon [1935]	1919–1931; 1935–1946
Northwest Special	Union Pacific	Salt Lake City, Utah–Butte, Montana–Spokane, Washington [1952]	1947–1958
Northwestern Limited	Chicago & Northwestern	Chicago, Illinois–Minneapolis–Saint Paul [1910]	1892–1912
Number Eighteen	New York Central	Chicago, Illinois–Cincinnati, Ohio–Buffalo, New York–Pittsburgh, Pennsylvania [1935]	1936–1946
Number Fifty-Five	New York Central	New York, New York–Chicago, Illinois–Boston, Massachusetts [1937]	1937–1940
Number Forty-Five	New York Central	New York, New York–Utica, New York [1935]	1934–1945
Number Forty-Four	New York Central	New York, New York–Cleveland, Ohio [1935]	1933–1941
Number Forty-One	New York Central	New York, New York–Chicago, Illinois [1916]	1911–1934
Number Four	New York Central	New York, New York–Chicago, Illinois–St. Louis, Missouri [1918]	1916–1928
Number Seven	New York Central	New York, New York–Cleveland, Ohio–Toronto, Ontario [1935]	1932–1941
Number Six	New York Central	New York, New York–Chicago, Illinois–Cincinnati, Ohio [1911]	1911–1920
Number Thirty-One	New York Central	New York, New York–Plattsburgh, New York [1935]	1933–1937
Number Thirty-Two	Pennsylvania	New York, New York–Washington, DC [1925]	1922–1928
Number Twenty-Three	New York Central	New York, New York–Chicago, Illinois [1933]	1932–1936
Number Twenty-Three	New York Central	New York, New York–Chicago, Illinois [1933]	1932–1936
Nutmeg	New York, New Haven and Hartford	Boston–Waterbury, Connecticut [1955]	1950-1955
Nutmeg State	Amtrak	Washington, DC–Springfield, Massachusetts [1995]	1993–1998

== O ==
Train Name	Railroad	Train Endpoints in a typical [year]	Operated
Oakland Lark	Southern Pacific	Los Angeles, California–Oakland, California [1945]	1932–1960
Ohio Special	New York Central	Detroit, Michigan–Cincinnati, Ohio (in its earlier years the train had many other northern and southern endpoints) [1945]	1913–1933, 1942–1958
Ohio State Limited	New York Central	New York, New York–Cincinnati, Ohio [1948]	1924–1967
Ohioan	Pennsylvania	Chicago, Illinois–Columbus, Ohio [1936]	1935–1958
Oil City Express	Pennsylvania	Pittsburgh, Pennsylvania–Oil City, Pennsylvania [1945]	1938–1950
Oil Field Special	Texas and Pacific Railway	Dallas, Texas–Breckenridge, Texas [1921]	1921–1924
Oil Fields Special	Frisco Railroad	Kansas City, Missouri–Dallas, Texas [1930]	1921–1939
Oil Flyer	Santa Fe	Kansas City, Missouri–Tulsa, Oklahoma [1948]	1925–1968
Oil Special	Rock Island Lines	Chicago, Illinois–Amarillo, Texas [1927]	1927–1932
Oiler	Missouri Pacific	Little Rock, Arkansas–El Dorado, Arkansas [1923]	1921–1928
Oklahoma Express	Katy Railroad	Kansas City, Missouri–Muskogee, Oklahoma [1922]	1921–1926
Oklahoma Rocket	Rock Island Lines	Kansas City, Missouri–Oklahoma City, Oklahoma [1950]	1950–1952
Oklahoma Special	Frisco, Alton Railroad, Rock Island Rail Road	Chicago, Illinois–St. Louis, Missouri–Oklahoma City, Oklahoma–Amarillo, Texas [1930]	1925–1932
Oklahoman	Frisco	St. Louis, Missouri–Oklahoma City, Oklahoma [1965]	1933–1958; 1965–1967
Old Dominion	Richmond, Fredericksburg & Potomac	Washington, DC–Richmond, Virginia (with through cars to New York and Birmingham) [1948]	1947–1948
Old Dominion	Amtrak	New York, New York–Newport News, Virginia [1993]	1992–1998
Old Dominion Express	Chesapeake and Ohio Railway	Chicago, Illinois–Huntington, West Virginia [1911]	1911–1914
Old Dominion Limited	Chesapeake and Ohio Railway	Chicago, Illinois–Cincinnati, Ohio–Washington, DC–Newport News, Virginia [1923]	1923–1928
Olympian	Milwaukee Road	Chicago, Illinois–Seattle, Washington [1930]	1911–1947
Olympian Hiawatha	Milwaukee Road	Chicago, Illinois–Seattle, Washington [1952]	1947–1961
Omaha and Des Moines Daylight Express	Minneapolis and St. Louis Railway	Minneapolis–Saint Paul–Omaha, Nebraska [1900]	1900–1904
Omaha and Des Moines Limited	Minneapolis and St. Louis Railway	Minneapolis–Saint Paul–Omaha, Nebraska [1900]	1900–1904
Omaha Day Express	Chicago Great Western	Minneapolis–Saint Paul–Omaha, Nebraska [1914]	1911–1921
Omaha Express	Chicago Great Western	Minneapolis–Saint Paul–Omaha, Nebraska [1948]	1911–1932; 1948–1949
Omaha Express	Chicago & Northwestern	Minneapolis–Saint Paul–Omaha, Nebraska [1924]	1919–1930
Omaha Limited	Chicago Great Western	Minneapolis–Saint Paul–Omaha, Nebraska [1912]	1911–1915
Omaha Limited	Chicago & Northwestern	Minneapolis–Saint Paul–Omaha, Nebraska [1920]	1919–1928
Omaha Limited	Wabash Railroad	St. Louis, Missouri–Omaha, Nebraska [1948]	1939–1960
Omaha-Chicago Express	Illinois Central	Chicago, Illinois–Omaha, Nebraska [1915]	1900–1901; 1913–1917
Omaha-Chicago Limited	Illinois Central	Chicago, Illinois–Omaha, Nebraska [1900]	1900–1911
Omaha-Chicago Special	Chicago & Northwestern	Chicago, Illinois–Omaha, Nebraska [1922]	1897–1899; 1915–1927
Omaha-Kansas Express	Chicago & Northwestern	Minneapolis–Saint Paul–Omaha, Nebraska–Kansas City, Missouri [1915]	1913–1918
Omaha, Minneapolis and St. Paul Express	Minneapolis and St. Louis Railway, Illinois Central Railroad	Minneapolis–Saint Paul–Omaha, Nebraska [1904]	1900–1910
Omaha, Minneapolis and St. Paul Limited	Minneapolis and St. Louis Railway, Illinois Central Railroad	Minneapolis–Saint Paul–Omaha, Nebraska [1904]	1900–1910
Omahan	Chicago & Northwestern	Chicago, Illinois–Omaha, Nebraska [1956]	1956–1958
On Wisconsin	Milwaukee Road	Chicago, Illinois–Madison, Wisconsin [1930]	1929–1954
Oneida	Amtrak	New York, New York–Syracuse, New York [1997]	1997–1998
Onondaga	Delaware, Lackawanna and Western Railroad, Reading Railroad	Philadelphia–Syracuse, New York [1938]	1932–1943
Onondaga	New York Central	New York City–Syracuse, New York [1945]	1934–1936; 1945–1949
Ontarian	New York Central, Toronto, Hamilton and Buffalo Railway, Canadian Pacific Railway	New York City–Toronto [1966]	1938–1960; 1964–1967
Ontarian-Lake Erie	New York Central, Toronto, Hamilton and Buffalo Railway, Canadian Pacific Railway	New York, New York–Toronto, Ontario–Cleveland, Ohio [1942]	1942–1946
Orange Blossom Special	Seaboard Air Line Railroad	New York, New York–Miami, Florida–Fort Myers, Florida (different Florida endpoints in different years) [1948]	1925–1953
Oregon and California Express	Southern Pacific	San Francisco, California–Portland, Oregon [1911]	1900–1906; 1910–1918
Oregon Express	Southern Pacific	San Francisco, California–Portland, Oregon [1920]	1898–1899; 1907–1909; 1919–1927
Oregon Trail Express	Union Pacific	Portland, Oregon–Pocatello, Idaho [1927]	1927–1932
Oregon-Washington Express	Union Pacific	Portland, Oregon–Green River, Wyoming [1916]	1914–1920
Oregon-Washington Limited	Union Pacific, Chicago and North Western	Chicago, Illinois–Portland, Oregon [1916]	1910–1922
Oregonian	Oregon & California; Southern Pacific	San Francisco, California–Portland, Oregon [1930]	1918–1932; 1937–1946
Oregonian	Great Northern	Minneapolis–Saint Paul–Seattle, Washington–Portland, Oregon [1910]	1910–1915
Oriental Limited	Great Northern, Chicago, Burlington and Quincy Railroad	Chicago, Illinois–Seattle, Washington [1948]	1905–1931; 1947–1951
Orleanean	Missouri Pacific, Gulf Coast Lines	New Orleans, Louisiana–Houston, Texas [1948]	1923–1964
Over-Sea Limited	Florida East Coast Railway	Jacksonville, Florida–Key West, Florida [1916]	1910–1916
Overland Express	Chicago, Burlington & Quincy	Chicago, Illinois–Denver, Colorado (with through cars to Pacific endpoints) [1916]	1910–1918; 1922–1941
Overland Flyer	Union Pacific, Southern Pacific, Chicago and North Western	Chicago, Illinois–San Francisco, California [1887]	1887–1896
Overland Limited	Union Pacific, Southern Pacific, Chicago and North Western	Chicago, Illinois–San Francisco, California (aka San Francisco Overland Limited) [1938]	1896–1963
Overnighter	Maine Central, Boston and Maine, New Haven	New York, New York–Woodsville, New Hampshire–Berlin, New Hampshire [1952]	1947–1958
Overseas	New York Central, Canadian Pacific Railway	Montreal, Quebec–Detroit, Michigan [1952]	1929–1960
Owl	Lackawanna	Hoboken, New Jersey–Buffalo, New York [1940]	1919–1926; 1936–1968
Owl	New Haven	New York, New York–Boston, Massachusetts [1965]	1911–1913, 1919–1968
Owl	Southern Pacific	Dallas, Texas–Houston, Texas [1955]	1923–1958
Owl	Southern Pacific	San Francisco, California–Los Angeles, California [1955]	1900–1964
Owl	Great Northern	Vancouver, British Columbia–Portland, Oregon [1925]	1910–1930
Owl	Union Pacific	Denver, Colorado–San Francisco, California–Los Angeles, California [1923]	1912–1918; 1922–1933
Owl	Illinois Terminal Railroad	St. Louis, Missouri–Peoria, Illinois [1925]	1925–1940
Ozark Limited	Frisco	St. Louis, Missouri–Little Rock, Arkansas [1928]	1925–1931
Ozark State Zephyr	Chicago, Burlington and Quincy, Alton	St. Louis, Missouri–Kansas City, Missouri [1938]	1936–1939
Ozarker	Missouri Pacific	St. Louis, Missouri–Little Rock, Arkansas [1948]	1937–1955

== P ==
Train Name	Railroad	Train Endpoints in a typical [year]	Operated
Pacemaker	New York Central	New York, New York–Chicago, Illinois [1952]	1939–1966
Pacific	Chicago and North Western Railway, Union Pacific Railroad	Chicago, Illinois–Portland, Oregon–Los Angeles, California [1947]	1947–1952
Pacific Coast Express	Soo Line Railroad, Canadian Pacific Railway	Chicago, Illinois–Vancouver, British Columbia [1916]	1911–1916
Pacific Coast Limited	Denver and Rio Grande Railroad, Rock Island Rail Road, Southern Pacific	Chicago, Illinois–San Francisco, California [1903]	1892–1915
Pacific Express	Erie	Jersey City, New Jersey–Chicago, Illinois [1948]	1874–1879; 1892–1915; 1922–1964
Pacific Express	New York Central and its affiliates	New York, New York–Boston, Massachusetts–Chicago, Illinois [1925]	1870; 1879–1906; 1910–1926
Pacific Express	Pennsylvania	Philadelphia–Chicago (the train had many different endpoints over the years) [1915]	1870–1934
Pacific Express	Chicago, Burlington & Quincy, Northern Pacific Railway	Minneapolis–Saint Paul–Portland, Oregon [1924]	1902–1905; 1921–1930
Pacific Express	Michigan Central Railroad	Chicago–Buffalo, New York [1930]	1928–1934
Pacific Express	Union Pacific, Chicago and North Western	Chicago, Illinois–Portland, Oregon [1903]	1901–1909
Pacific Express	Western Pacific Railroad	Salt Lake City, Utah–San Francisco, California [1930]	1916–1931
Pacific International	Amtrak	Seattle, Washington–Vancouver, British Columbia [1975]	1972–1981
Pacific Limited	Grand Trunk Western	Chicago, Illinois–Montreal, Quebec	?
Pacific Limited	Milwaukee Road, Union Pacific Railroad, Southern Pacific	Chicago, Illinois–Los Angeles, California–San Francisco, California [1916]	1890–1894; 1914–1946
Pacific Surfliner (group of trains)	Amtrak	San Diego, California–Paso Robles, California [2014]	2000–present
Padre	Southern Pacific	Los Angeles, California–Oakland, California [1930]	1923–1931
Palace Express	Alton Railroad	Chicago, Illinois–St. Louis, Missouri [1918]	1901–1927
Palisades	Amtrak	New York, New York–Albany, New York [1991]	1991–1995
Palm Beach Limited	Florida East Coast Railway	Jacksonville, Florida–Miami, Florida [1910]	1910–1914
Palmetto	Amtrak	New York, New York–Savannah, Georgia [1980]	1976–1995; 2002–present
Palmetto	Pennsylvania Railroad, Richmond, Fredericksburg and Potomac Railroad, Atlantic Coast Line Railroad (Seaboard Coast Line replacing ACL, 1967)	New York, New York–Augusta, Georgia, Savannah, Georgia and Wilmington, North Carolina [1949]; Washington, D.C.-Augusta, Georgia [1967]	1944–1968
Palmetto Limited	Pennsylvania Railroad, Richmond, Fredericksburg and Potomac Railroad, Atlantic Coast Line Railroad	New York, New York–Augusta, Georgia, Savannah, Georgia and Wilmington, North Carolina [1939]	1910–1944
Palmland	Pennsylvania Railroad, Richmond, Fredericksburg and Potomac Railroad, Seaboard Air Line Railroad	Boston, Massachusetts–Miami, Florida–Fort Myers, Florida (different endpoints in different years) [1948]	1941–1971
Pan-American	Louisville & Nashville	Cincinnati, Ohio–New Orleans, Louisiana (some years there were through trains to New York) [1925]	1921–1971
Pan-Handle Express	Pennsylvania	New York, New York–Chicago, Illinois [1931]	1915–1935
Panama Limited	Illinois Central until 1971; Amtrak from 1971	Chicago, Illinois–New Orleans, Louisiana	1908–1980
Panhandle Express	Santa Fe	Albuquerque, New Mexico–Belen, New Mexico (many different endpoints over the years) [1925]	1920–1950
Panoramic	Denver and Rio Grande Western Railroad	Denver, Colorado–Salt Lake City, Utah [1927]	1926–1931; 1935–1938
Park Avenue	New Haven	New York, New York–Boston, Massachusetts [1945]	1940–1946; 1959–1960
Park Special	Union Pacific	Salt Lake City, Utah–Victor, Idaho [1962]	1961–1965
Passenger	Southern Pacific; Rock Island	Salt Lake City, California–Chicago, Illinois [1947]	1940s–1950s
Patersonian	New York, Susquehanna and Western Railway	New York, New York–Paterson, New Jersey [1952]	1950–1957
Patriot	New Haven, Pennsylvania Railroad; Amtrak from 1971	Boston, Massachusetts–Washington, DC [1937]	1937–1972; 1977–1998
Patroon	Amtrak	New York, New York–Albany, New York [1995]	1992–1997
Paul Revere	New York Central	Chicago, Illinois–Boston, Massachusetts [1952]	1945–1955
Paul Revere Express	New Haven, Boston and Albany Railroad	New York, New York–Boston, Massachusetts [1920]	1919–1924
Pawling Express	New York Central	New York, New York–Pawling, New York [1911]	1904; 1911–1915
Peach Queen	Southern Railway; Pennsylvania Railroad	New York, New York–Atlanta, Georgia [1952]	1947–1970
Peconic Bay Express	Long Island Rail Road	Long Island City, New York–Greenport, New York [1936]	1926–1950
Pelican	Southern Railway, Pennsylvania Railroad Norfolk and Western Railway	New York, New York–New Orleans, Louisiana [1948]	1946–1970
Peninsula 400	Chicago and North Western Railway	Chicago, Illinois–Ishpeming, Michigan [1945]	1942–1971
Peninsular	Pere Marquette	Detroit, Michigan–Grand Rapids, Michigan [1926]	1925–1935
Penn Texas	Pennsylvania	New York, New York–St Louis, Missouri[1952]	1948–1970
Penn-Bay State	New Haven, Pennsylvania Railroad	Boston–Philadelphia [1944]	1941–1946
Pennsy Aerotrain	Pennsylvania	Pittsburgh–New York City [1956]	1956–1957
Pennsylvania Limited	Pennsylvania, Penn Central	New York City–Chicago (endpoints varied over the years) [1948]	1887–1971
Pennsylvania Special	Pennsylvania	New York, New York–Chicago, Illinois [1903]	1902–1912
Pennsylvania-Lehigh Express	Pennsylvania, Lehigh Valley Railroad	Pittsburgh, Pennsylvania–Phillipsburg, New Jersey [1928]	1919–1931
Pennsylvanian	Pennsylvania	New York, New York–Chicago, Illinois [1941]	1941–1949
Pennsylvanian	Amtrak	New York, New York–Pittsburgh, Pennsylvania [1982]	1980–2016
Penobscot	Boston and Maine; Maine Central	Boston, Massachusetts–Bangor, Maine [1946]	1943–1959
Peoria Rocket	Rock Island; Amtrak from 1971	Chicago, Illinois–Peoria, Illinois [1952]	1937–1978
Peoria Special	New York Central	Peoria, Illinois–Indianapolis, Indiana [1940]	1929–1941
Peoria-Chicago Rocket	Rock Island	Chicago, Illinois–Peoria, Illinois [1942]	1940–1949
Peoria-Chicago Special	Rock Island	Chicago, Illinois–Peoria, Illinois [1923]	1920–1936
Peorian	Rock Island	Chicago, Illinois–Peoria, Illinois [1930]	1929–1937; 1969–1971
Peorian	Illinois Terminal Railroad	St. Louis, Missouri–Peoria, Illinois [1932]	1931–1935
Peorian	New York Central	Peoria, Illinois–Indianapolis, Indiana [1952]	1951–1955
Pere Marquette (group of trains)	Pere Marquette, Chesapeake and Ohio	Detroit, Michigan–Grand Rapids, Michigan–Chicago, Illinois [1948]	1946–1971
Pere Marquette	Amtrak	Chicago, Illinois–Grand Rapids, Michigan [2008]	1984–1995; 2004–present
Pershing Square	New York, New Haven and Hartford Railroad	Boston, Massachusetts–New York, New York [1942]	1940–1966
Philadelphia and Buffalo Express	Reading, Lehigh Valley Railroad	Philadelphia–Buffalo, New York [1916]	1908–1916
Philadelphia and Washington Express	Pennsylvania	Philadelphia–Washington, D.C. [1945]	1900–1910; 1915–1950
Philadelphia Express	Pennsylvania	Philadelphia–Pittsburgh (endpoints varied over the years) [1952]	1868–1870; 1874–1932; 1939–1953
Philadelphia Express	Reading, Lehigh Valley Railroad, New York Central Railroad	Detroit–New York City–Philadelphia [1922]	1922–1927
Philadelphia Express	Baltimore & Ohio Railroad; Central Railroad of New Jersey; Reading Railroad	Jersey City, New Jersey–Cincinnati [1938]	1936–1948
Philadelphia Flyer	Central Railroad of New Jersey; Reading Railroad	Philadelphia–Scranton, Pennsylvania [1928]	1910–1949
Philadelphia Night Express	Pennsylvania	Philadelphia, Pennsylvania–Pittsburgh, Pennsylvania (endpoints varied over the years) [1948]	1909–1961
Philadelphia Special	Pennsylvania	Philadelphia, Pennsylvania–Pittsburgh, Pennsylvania [1903]	1903–1909
Philadelphia-New York Express	Reading, Lehigh Valley Railroad, Grand Trunk Western Railroad	Philadelphia, Pennsylvania–New York, New York–Port Huron, Michigan [1916]	1897–1907; 1911–1916; 1920–1930
Philadelphia, Washington and Richmond Express	Pennsylvania, Richmond, Fredericksburg and Potomac Railroad	Philadelphia, Pennsylvania–Richmond, Virginia [1920]	1919–1924
Philadelphian	Baltimore and Ohio Railroad	Philadelphia, Pennsylvania–Washington, DC [1918]	1914–1921; 1933–1934
Philadelphian	Pennsylvania	Philadelphia, Pennsylvania–Pottsville, Pennsylvania [1924]	1922–1930
Philadelphian	Delaware, Lackawanna and Western Railroad; Central Railroad of New Jersey; Reading Railroad	Philadelphia, Pennsylvania–Syracuse, New York [1922]	1922–1928
Philadelphian	Amtrak	New York, New York–Philadelphia, Pennsylvania [1980]	1980–1981
Phoebe Snow	Lackawanna, Nickel Plate Road; Erie Lackawanna, Nickel Plate Road	Hoboken, New Jersey–Buffalo, New York as Delaware Lackawanna & Western [1950] Hoboken, New Jersey–Chicago, Illinois as Erie Lackawanna [1964]	1949–1961; reinstated 1963–1966
Phoenix	Santa Fe	Los Angeles, California–Oakland, California–Phoenix, Arizona [1930]	1910–1933
Piedmont	Southern	Washington, DC–New Orleans, Louisiana [1970]	1970–1976
Piedmont	Amtrak	Raleigh, North Carolina–Charlotte, North Carolina (group of trains from 2010) [1995]	1993–present
Piedmont Limited	Southern, Pennsylvania Railroad, Atlanta and West Point Railroad, Western Railway of Alabama, Louisville and Nashville Railroad	New York, New York–New Orleans, Louisiana [1948]	1923–1967
Pilgrim	New Haven, Boston and Albany Railroad	New York, New York–Boston, Massachusetts [1922]	1919–1924
Pilgrim	New Haven, Pennsylvania Railroad	Boston, Massachusetts–Pittsburgh, Pennsylvania [1937]	1937–1949; 1953–1967
Pilgrim	Amtrak	New York, New York–Philadelphia, Pennsylvania [1975]	1974–1977
Pine Tree Limited	Boston & Maine; Maine Central	Boston, Massachusetts–Bangor, Maine (called 'Pine Tree' from 1946) [1946]	1925–1958
Pinellas	Atlantic Coast Line	St. Petersburg, Florida–Jacksonville, Florida [1920]	1918–1927
Pioneer	Gulf Coast Lines, later Missouri Pacific	Houston, Texas–Brownsville, Texas [1933]	1929–1964
Pioneer	Amtrak	Salt Lake City, Utah–Seattle, Washington [1980]	1977–1996
Pioneer Limited	Milwaukee Road	Chicago, Illinois–Minneapolis, Minnesota [1940]	1898–1971
Pioneer Zephyr	Chicago, Burlington & Quincy	Kansas City, Missouri–Omaha, Nebraska–Lincoln, Nebraska [1940] Galesburg, Illinois–Springfield, Missouri	1934–1960
Pittsburgh and Buffalo Limited	Lake Shore and Michigan Southern Railway	Pittsburgh, Pennsylvania–Buffalo, New York [1914]	1911–1932
Pittsburgh and Chicago Express	Baltimore and Ohio Railroad	Jersey City, New Jersey–Chicago, Illinois [1920]	1917–1930
Pittsburgh and Chicago Express	Pennsylvania	Philadelphia, Pennsylvania–Chicago, Illinois [1923]	1923–1929
Pittsburgh and Northern Express	Pennsylvania	Philadelphia, Pennsylvania–Washington, DC–Pittsburgh, Pennsylvania [1910]	1909–1914
Pittsburgh Day Express	Pennsylvania	New York, New York–Pittsburgh, Pennsylvania [1907]	1906–1914
Pittsburgh Express	Pennsylvania	Philadelphia, Pennsylvania–Pittsburgh, Pennsylvania (with through cars to the west) [1920]	1870–1881; 1896–1924
Pittsburgh Express	Baltimore and Ohio Railroad	Philadelphia, Pennsylvania–Pittsburgh, Pennsylvania [1920]	1917–1928
Pittsburgh Express	New Haven, Pennsylvania Railroad	Boston, Massachusetts–Pittsburgh, Pennsylvania [1930]	1921–1937
Pittsburgh Express	New York Central	Detroit, Michigan–Pittsburgh, Pennsylvania [1927]	1927–1936
Pittsburgh Express	Delaware, Lackawanna and Western Railroad	Scranton, Pennsylvania – Pittsburgh, Pennsylvania (1939)	1936-1949
Pittsburgh Limited	Baltimore and Ohio Railroad	Jersey City, New Jersey–Pittsburgh, Pennsylvania [1907]	1900–1912
Pittsburgh Limited	New York Central, Pittsburgh and Lake Erie Railroad	Buffalo, New York–Pittsburgh, Pennsylvania [1908]	1906–1910; 1921–1931
Pittsburgh Night Express	Pennsylvania	Philadelphia, Pennsylvania–Pittsburgh, Pennsylvania [1948]	1907–1961
Pittsburgh Special	Pennsylvania	New York, New York–Pittsburgh, Pennsylvania–St. Louis, Missouri [1904]	1904–1914; 1928–1929
Pittsburgh Special	New York Central	Detroit, Michigan–Pittsburgh, Pennsylvania [1930]	1927–1952
Pittsburgh-Buffalo Express	New York Central, Pittsburgh and Lake Erie Railroad	Pittsburgh, Pennsylvania–Buffalo, New York (with through cars to other cities in some years) [1952]	1917–1918; 1922; 1927–1962
Pittsburgh-Cleveland Express	New York Central	Buffalo, New York–Pittsburgh, Pennsylvania–St. Louis, Missouri [1942]	1942–1953
Pittsburgh-Cleveland-Detroit Special	Lake Shore and Michigan Southern Railway	Buffalo, New York–Pittsburgh, Pennsylvania [1915]	1914–1918
Pittsburgher	Pennsylvania Railroad	Pittsburgh, Pennsylvania–New York City [1948]	1916–1917; 1924–1964
Pittsfield and North Adams Special	New York Central	New York City–North Adams, Massachusetts (aka 'Pittsfield and North Adams Express' [1908]	1907–1909; 1914–1921
Pittsfield Special	New York Central	New York, New York–Pittsfield, Massachusetts (aka 'Pittsfield Express) [1904]	1901–1910
Plainsman	Frisco	Oklahoma City–Floydada, Texas [1930]	1929–1935
Planter	Illinois Central	Memphis, Tennessee–New Orleans, Louisiana via Vicksburg & Baton Rouge [1938]	1931–1952
Pocahontas	Norfolk and Western Railway	Norfolk, Virginia–Cincinnati, Ohio [1948]	1927–1971
Pocono Express	Lackawanna; Erie–Lackawanna	Buffalo, New York–Hoboken, New Jersey (for New York) [1948]	1936–1965
Pocono Limited	Lackawanna, Pennsylvania Railroad	Philadelphia, Pennsylvania–East Stroudsburg, Pennsylvania [1916]	1915–1935
Ponce de Leon	New York Central, Southern Railway, Seaboard Air Line Railroad	Detroit, Michigan–Chicago, Illinois–Cleveland, Ohio–Jacksonville, Florida–St. Petersburg, Florida (many different endpoints over the years) [1952]	1925–1966
Pony Express	New Jersey Transit	Hoboken, New Jersey–Monmouth Park Racetrack, New Jersey [1983]	1980–2006
Pony Express	Union Pacific	Kansas City, Missouri–Los Angeles, California (many different endpoints over the years) [1952]	1927–1954
Portland and Puget Sound Express	Union Pacific; Chicago and North Western	Chicago, Illinois–Portland, Oregon [1916]	1911–1918
Portland Flyer	Oregon Railroad and Navigation Company	Portland, Oregon–Umatilla, Oregon (with through cars to Midwestern cities) [1903]	1901–1909
Portland Limited	Union Pacific; Chicago and North Western	Chicago, Illinois–Portland, Oregon [1925]	1923–1930
Portland Rose	Union Pacific, Chicago and North Western	Chicago, Illinois–Portland, Oregon [1952] Denver, Colorado–Portland, Oregon [1948] Kansas City, Missouri–Portland, Oregon	1930–1971
Portland-Chicago Special	Union Pacific, Chicago and North Western	Chicago, Illinois–Portland, Oregon [1906]	1905–1909
Portland-Spokane Limited	Union Pacific	Portland, Oregon–Spokane, Washington [1918]	1915–1930
Potatoland Special	Bangor & Aroostook	Bangor, Maine–Madawaska, Maine [1955]	1943–1959
Potomac	Pennsylvania	Washington, DC–Detroit, Michigan–Chicago, Illinois (with through cars for western points) [1930] New York, New York–Washington, DC [1960]	1929–1962
Potomac	Amtrak	New York, New York–Washington, DC [1982]	1982–1988
Potomac Turbo	Amtrak	New York, New York–Parkersburg, West Virginia [1971]	1971–1972
Powhatan Arrow	Norfolk and Western Railway	Norfolk, Virginia–Cincinnati, Ohio [1948]	1946–1969
Prairie Marksman	Amtrak	Chicago, Illinois–East Peoria, Illinois [1980]	1980–1981
Prairie State	New York Central	Chicago, Illinois–Cleveland, Ohio [1930]	1929–1956
Prairie State	Amtrak	Milwaukee, Wisconsin–St. Louis, Missouri [1971]	1971–1972
Prairie State Express	Alton Railroad, Gulf, Mobile and Ohio Railroad from 1947	Chicago, Illinois–St. Louis, Missouri [1950]	1900–1958
Prairie State Special	Chicago North Shore and Milwaukee Railroad	Chicago, Illinois–Milwaukee, Wisconsin [1930]	1929–1933
President	Pennsylvania	New York, New York–Washington, DC [1948]	1931–1971
Prospector	Rio Grande	Denver, Colorado–Salt Lake City, Utah–Ogden, Utah	1941–1942; 1945–1967
Puget Sound	Northern Pacific Railway, Chicago, Burlington and Quincy Railroad	Seattle, Washington–Portland, Oregon different Midwestern cities in different years	1902–1907; 1911–1936
Puget Sound	Amtrak	Seattle, Washington–Portland, Oregon	1971–1976
Puritan	New York, New Haven and Hartford Railroad	New York, New York–Boston, Massachusetts [1948]	1925–1968

== Q ==
Train Name	Railroad	Train Endpoints in a typical [year]	Operated
Quad Cities Rocket	Rock Island	Chicago, Illinois–Rock Island, Illinois [1971]	−1978
Quaker	New York, New Haven and Hartford Railroad, Pennsylvania Railroad; Amtrak in 1973	Pittsburgh, Pennsylvania--Boston, Massachusetts [1949]	1920–1958; 1973
Quaker City	Amtrak	New York, New York–Philadelphia, Pennsylvania [1980]	1980–1981; 1995
Quaker City Express	Pennsylvania; Pennsylvania–Reading Seashore Lines	Philadelphia, Pennsylvania–Atlantic City, New Jersey [1934]	1934–1935
Quaker City Express	Pennsylvania	New York, New York–Pittsburgh, Pennsylvania [1910]	1906–1929
Queen and Crescent Limited	Southern Railway	Cincinnati, Ohio–New Orleans, Louisiana (with through cars to Midwestern cities) [1930]	1926–1949
Queen and Crescent Special	Queen and Crescent Route, Southern Railway	Cincinnati, Ohio–New Orleans, Louisiana [1918]	1895–1913
Queen City	New York Central	Cincinnati, Ohio–Detroit, Michigan [1955]	1949–1957
Queen City Limited	Baltimore and Ohio Railroad	St. Louis, Missouri–Cincinnati, Ohio [1910]	1905–1916
Queen City Limited	Cleveland, Cincinnati, Chicago and St. Louis Railway	Cincinnati, Ohio–Indianapolis, Indiana [1922]	1919–1930
Queen City Special	Cleveland, Cincinnati, Chicago and St. Louis Railway	Chicago, Illinois–Cincinnati, Ohio [1910]	1906–1946
Queen City Special	Southern Railway	Cincinnati, Ohio–New Orleans, Louisiana [1918]	1917–1926
Queen of the Valley	Central Railroad of New Jersey	Jersey City, New Jersey–Harrisburg, Pennsylvania [1948]	1911–1967
Quickstep	Nashville, Chattanooga and St. Louis Railway, Louisville and Nashville Railroad	St. Louis, Missouri–Atlanta, Georgia (other endpoints over the years) [1903]	1893–1907

== R ==
Train Name	Railroad	Train Endpoints in a typical [year]	Operated
Radisson	Amtrak	Chicago, Illinois–Milwaukee, Wisconsin [1980]	1980–1989
Rainbow	Pennsylvania	New York, New York–Chicago, Illinois [1930]	1929–1949
Rainbow Special	Missouri Pacific	Little Rock, Arkansas–Kansas City, Missouri [1948]	1921–1954
Ranger	Santa Fe	Chicago, Illinois–Galveston, Texas (many different endpoints over the years) [1930]	1916–1949
Raritan Clocker (group of trains)	Central Railroad of New Jersey	Jersey City, New Jersey–Allentown, Pennsylvania [1960]	1954–1963
Rebel	Gulf, Mobile & Northern; from 1941 Gulf, Mobile and Ohio Railroad	New Orleans, Louisiana–St. Louis, Missouri [1948]	1935–1953
Red Arrow	Pennsylvania	New York, New York–Detroit, Michigan [1952]	1925–1960
Red Bird	Chicago Great Western	Minneapolis, Minnesota–Rochester, Minnesota [1930]	1927–1932
Red Bird	Pennsylvania, Wabash Railroad	Chicago, Illinois–Detroit, Michigan [1948]	1941–1949
Red Bird	Pennsylvania	Chicago, Illinois–Cincinnati, Ohio [1954]	1952–1959
Red River	Great Northern	St. Paul, Minnesota–Grand Forks, North Dakota (aka 'Red River Limited') [1930]	1916–1941; 1947–1968
Red Wing	Boston and Maine, Canadian Pacific Railway	Boston, Massachusetts–Montreal, Quebec [1953]	1927–1959
Redwood	Northwestern Pacific	San Rafael, California–Eureka, California [1970]	1956–1971
Regional (group of trains)	Amtrak	Boston, Massachusetts–Newport News, Virginia	
Representative	Pennsylvania	New York, New York–Washington, DC [1948]	1931–1971
Resort Special	Pere Marquette (at times Chesapeake and Ohio Railway, Pennsylvania Railroad)	Chicago, Illinois–Bay View, Michigan, with second Detroit, Michigan-Bay View branch (different endpoints over the years) [1952] White Sulphur Springs, WV-New York City (1963)	1904; 1916; 1921–1928; 1936–c.1941; c.1948–1957; c.1963-c.1968
Resorter	Detroit and Mackinac Railway	Detroit, Michigan–Alpena, Michigan [1936]	1936–1942
Richmond-New York Express	Richmond, Fredericksburg and Potomac Railroad, Pennsylvania Railroad	New York, New York–Richmond, Virginia [1914]	1913–1918
Richmond-Washington Limited	Richmond, Fredericksburg and Potomac Railroad, Pennsylvania Railroad	New York, New York–Richmond, Virginia [1914]	1911–1918
Rio Grande Zephyr	Rio Grande	Denver, Colorado–Salt Lake City, Utah [1972]	1970–1983
Rip Van Winkle	Amtrak	New York, New York–Albany, New York [1982]	1981–1990
Rittenhouse	Amtrak	New York, New York–Philadelphia, Pennsylvania [1980]	1980–1981
River Cities	Amtrak	Kansas City, Missouri–New Orleans, Louisiana [1985]	1984–1992
River Valley Express	Pennsylvania	Philadelphia, Pennsylvania–Pottsville, Pennsylvania [1928]	1919–1930
Robert E. Lee	Richmond, Fredericksburg and Potomac Railroad, Pennsylvania Railroad, Seaboard Air Line Railroad	New York, New York–Birmingham, Alabama [1938]	1935–1947
Rochester 400	Chicago & North Western	Chicago, Illinois–Rochester, Minnesota [1960]	1960–1963
Rochester Express	Chicago Great Western	Chicago, Illinois–Rochester, Minnesota [1928]	1925–1930
Rochester Special	Chicago & North Western	Chicago, Illinois–Mankato, Minnesota [1956]	1956–1960
Rochester-Minnesota Special	Chicago & North Western	Chicago, Illinois–Mankato, Minnesota [1940]	1916–1917; 1921–1955
Rocky Mountain Limited	Rock Island	Chicago, Illinois–Denver, Colorado [1930]	1902–1939
Rocky Mountain Rocket	Rock Island	Kansas City, Missouri–Colorado Springs, Colorado [1952]	1939–1966
Roger Williams	New York, New Haven and Hartford Railroad	New York, New York–Boston, Massachusetts	1947–1949
Rogue River	Southern Pacific	Portland, Oregon–Ashland, Oregon [1943]	1941–1956
Royal Blue	Baltimore & Ohio Railroad; Central Railroad of New Jersey; Reading Railroad	Jersey City, New Jersey–Washington, DC [1952]	1890–1958
Royal Gorge	Missouri Pacific Railroad, Denver and Rio Grande Western Railroad, Western Pacific Railroad	St. Louis, Missouri–San Francisco, California [1945]	1940–1967
Royal Limited	Baltimore & Ohio Railroad; Central Railroad of New Jersey; Reading Railroad, Richmond, Fredericksburg and Potomac Railroad	Jersey City, New Jersey–Richmond, Virginia [1900]	1899–1916
Royal Palm	Southern	Cincinnati, Ohio–Miami, Florida (different northern and southern endpoints over the years) [1952]	1914–1970
Royal Poinciana	Florida East Coast Railway	Jacksonville, Florida–Miami, Florida [1948] (northern endpoints in earlier years)	1925–1952
Royal Special	Baltimore & Ohio Railroad; Central Railroad of New Jersey; Reading Railroad	Jersey City, New Jersey–Washington, DC [1912]	1911–1916
