= Cincinnatian =

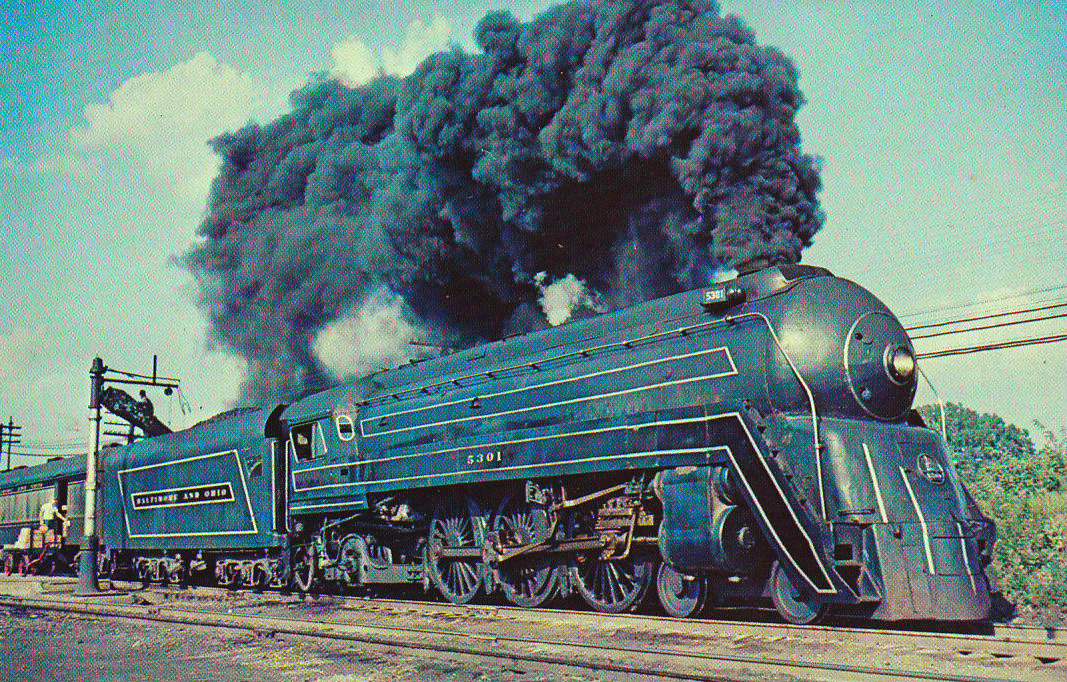
- The streamlined steam Cincinnatian in 1956.

Overview
- Status: Discontinued
- Locale: Midwestern United States
- First service: January 19, 1947
- Last service: April 30, 1971
- Former operator: Baltimore and Ohio Railroad

Route
- Termini: Detroit, Michigan (1950–1971); Cincinnati, Ohio (1950–1971)
- Stops: 14 (incl. Toledo, Lima, Dayton) (1950–1971)
- Distance travelled: 258.1 miles (415.4 km) 1950, southbound from Detroit to Cincinnati
- Average journey time: 6 hours, 35 minutes (southbound and northbound)
- Service frequency: Daily
- Train numbers: 75: westbound (To 1950); 76: eastbound 53: southbound (From 1950); 54: northbound

On-board services
- Seating arrangements: Reclining seat coaches
- Catering facilities: Observation-lounge diner, with radio; Stewardess service
- Observation facilities: "Fiesta car," with radio [1955]

Technical
- Track gauge: 4 ft 8 1/2 in (1,435 mm)

The Cincinnatian was a named passenger train operated by the Baltimore and Ohio Railroad (B&O). The B&O inaugurated service on January 19, 1947, with service between Baltimore, Maryland and Cincinnati, Ohio, carrying the number 75 westbound and 76 eastbound, essentially a truncated route of the National Limited which operated between Jersey City, New Jersey and St. Louis.

This route was unsuccessful due to the thin population along the line, and the route was changed on June 25, 1950, from a Baltimore–Cincinnati daylight schedule to a Detroit–Cincinnati daylight schedule where it would remain until the creation of Amtrak. On this new routing, originating from the New York Central's Michigan Central Station, the train sets became successful almost from the beginning. This replaced the Great Lakes Limited, which southbound, ran from Detroit to Cincinnati. Passengers wishing to travel all the way to Louisville had to take an unnamed night train counterpart, #57. The northbound night train counterpart was #58. The 57/58 became named the Night Express in 1960. The Cincinnatian on this route used lots of mail cars, which contributed to the route's success.

== History ==
The Cincinnatian is most famed for its original dedicated equipment, rebuilt in the B&O Mount Clare Shops. The design work was done by Olive Dennis, a pioneering civil engineer employed by the railroad and appointed by Daniel Willard to special position in charge of such work for passenger service. Four P-7 "president" class Pacific locomotives (5301-5304) were rebuilt and shrouded as class P-7d, with roller bearings on all axles and larger six-axle tenders. Older heavyweight passenger cars were completely stripped and rebuilt as streamliners. The livery used the blue and gray scheme designed by Otto Kuhler, which Dennis laid on the engine and tender in a pattern of horizontal stripes and angled lines. The train's stop in Lima, Ohio was at the Pennsylvania Railroad's Lima station, so passengers were able to transfer to the PRR's east-west trains there.

By fall, 1966, the train switched over to the Fort Street Union Depot for its travel to and from Detroit. In 1970 and 1971, the Cincinnatian was the only B&O train on the Cincinnati-Detroit route. The trains no longer offered checked baggage, as passengers had to carry their own luggage on and off the coaches. Service ended on April 30, 1971. When Amtrak took over service on May 1, 1971, it did not continue operating any of B&O's remaining passenger routes.

== Station list ==
Stations	State
Detroit - Fort St. Depot	Michigan
Toledo	Ohio
Deshler	Ohio
Lima	Ohio
Wapakoneta	Ohio
Sidney	Ohio
Piqua	Ohio
Troy	Ohio
Dayton	Ohio
Middletown	Ohio
Hamilton	Ohio
Winton Place	Ohio
Cincinnati	Ohio

== Equipment ==
The original 1947 Cincinnatian consisted of rebuilt heavyweight cars:

First consist

- #1307 Eden Park baggage-crew's room-buffet-lounge
- #3565 Indian Hill coach (60 seats)
- #3572 Oakley coach (56 seats)
- #3567 College Hill coach (60 seats)
- #3304 Peebles Corner cafe-observation

Second consist

- #1308 Hyde Park baggage-crew's room-buffet-lounge
- #3566 Winton Place coach (60 seats)
- #3573 Norwood coach (56 seats)
- #3568 Walnut Hills coach (60 seats)
- #3305 Fountain Square cafe-observation

There were stewardess' rooms in the Oakley and Norwood. Two 52-seat coaches, the Avondale (#3574) and Price Hill (#3575), replaced the College Hill and Walnut Hill.

== Route ==
From Detroit to Toledo, the trains ran with trackage rights on the Pere Marquette Railway and the Wabash Railroad. From Toledo south, the tracks were Baltimore and Ohio owned. The route was straight south Toledo to Deshler (junction with B&O's Washington–Chicago main line), Lima, Piqua, Dayton, Hamilton, then Cincinnati.
