= Petoskey station =

- Chesapeake & Ohio Railway Station
- U.S. National Register of Historic Places
- Michigan State Historic Site
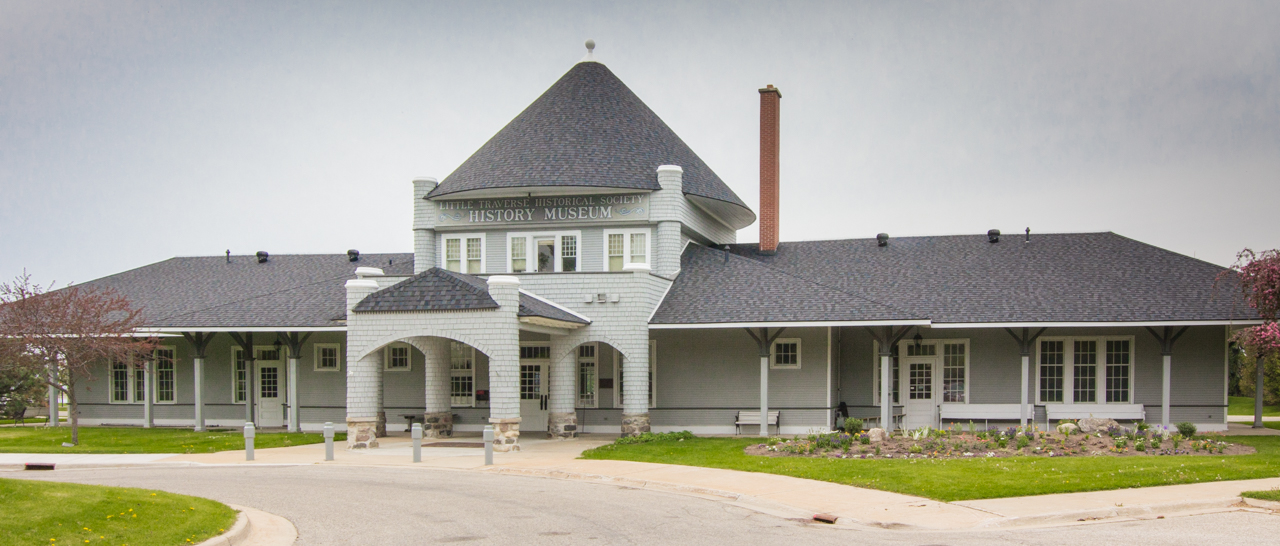
- Depot Museum, 2015

- Location within Michigan Location within the United States
- Interactive map
- Location: Pioneer Park, W. Lake St., Petoskey, Michigan
- Coordinates: 45°22′31″N 84°57′33″W
- Area: 1 acre (0.40 ha)
- Built: 1892
- Built by: Mosser & Wilson
- Architectural style: Shingle style
- NRHP reference No.: 70000270
- Added to NRHP: October 15, 1970

The Chesapeake & Ohio Railway Station is a railway depot located in Pioneer Park on West Lake Street in Petoskey, Michigan. It was placed on the National Register of Historic Places in 1970. The building now houses the Little Traverse Historical Museum.

== History ==
The Grand Rapids and Indiana Railroad began service to Petoskey in 1874, and was the only railroad in the area. In 1891, a second railroad, the Chicago and West Michigan Railway, began constructing a line with attendant buildings, between Elk Rapids and Petoskey. The railway purchased this land on the shore of Little Traverse Bay to place their Petoskey Depot. The company hired the Cadillac firm of Mosser and Wilson to construct the depot, and both the rail line and depot were completed in 1892. The town of Petoskey then created a park (now Pioneer Park) surrounding the depot.

In 1899, the Chicago and West Michigan Railway and this station was absorbed into the Pere Marquette Railway. The Pere Marquette (PM), in turn, was merged into the Chesapeake and Ohio Railway (C&O) in 1947. The PM, and later, the C&O, ran the Resort Special night train from Chicago, along with local trains on the route. The Petoskey station continued to serve passengers until the 1950s, when it was abandoned. The C&O ran passenger trains to Petoskey until some point between 1961 and 1963. In 1970, the Little Traverse Regional Historical Society obtained a lease on the depot and some of the surrounding land. The building was converted into a museum in 1971, and as of 2017 is used as the Little Traverse Historical Museum

== Description ==
The Chesapeake and Ohio Depot is located just on the edge of Little Traverse Bay. It is a distinctly Victorian Shingle style building with a distinct Victorian cast. The long building originally had open platforms at each end, but these were filled in during subsequent renovations. A porte cochere extends in the front of the building, and perching atop the building is a squat conical roof. Next to the conical section is a tall narrow chimney.

Preceding station	Chesapeake and Ohio Railway	Following station
Bayshore toward Grand Rapids	Grand Rapids – Bay View	Bay View Terminus
