= Grand Rapids Union Station =

Railway station

Coordinates: 42.9615°N 85.6706°W

Grand Rapids Union Station was a union station in Grand Rapids, Michigan. A Georgian Revival building of two stories, it was built in 1900 on 61 Ionia Avenue SW and was closed in 1958. The building was demolished in 1958 and 1959 to make space for the U.S. Route 131 highway.

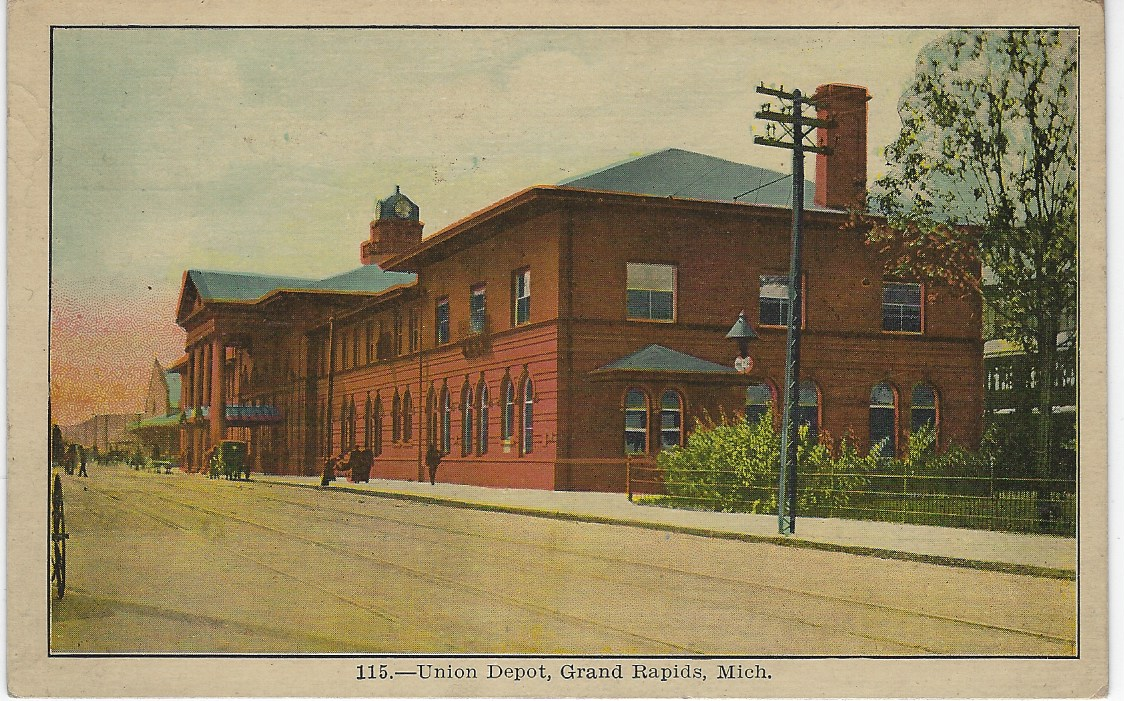
Union Station in Grand Rapids, Michigan, c. 1910

== History ==
In five years after Union Station's 1900 construction, 750,000 passengers passed through it. In early decades, Grand Rapids and Indiana Railroad excursion trains to the station brought more than 2000 visitors from southern Michigan and Indiana on Sundays.

== Passenger services ==
The station served the Pere Marquette Railway (after the Chesapeake and Ohio Railway acquired the PM in 1947 C&O trains passed through), Michigan Central Railroad and Pennsylvania Railroad (which had acquired the GR&I). The Grand Trunk Western Railway and the New York Central Railroad were served at other stations in Grand Rapids. By 1946, Michigan Central operations were entirely folded into New York Central operations.

Noteworthy passenger train service at 1950 included:

- Chesapeake and Ohio Railway (formerly the Pere Marquette Railway):
  - Pere Marquettes (Detroit [Fort Street Union Depot]–Lansing–Grand Rapids)
  - Resort Special (summer only night train, Chicago [Central Station]–Petoskey)
  - Grand Rapids–Petoskey; unnamed segments in off-season
- New York Central Railroad:
  - unnamed train (Grand Rapids–Jackson–Detroit [Michigan Central Station])
- Pennsylvania Railroad:
  - Northern Arrow (summer only night train, Cincinnati [Cincinnati Union Terminal]–Fort Wayne–Grand Rapids–Petoskey–Mackinaw City; unnamed segments in off-season)
  - unnamed local train on same route as above
  - unnamed train timed to connect at Cincinnati to the Louisville & Nashville's Southland, bound for Florida

=== Waning years ===
By the 1960s the Chesapeake and Ohio's trains were the only trains serving the successor to the station. The Chicago–Grand Rapids trains were added to the appellation, the Pere Marquettes in 1965. These trains ended in 1971 when C&O passed control of its passenger trains over to Amtrak.

== Present-day station ==
In 1984 passenger trains returned with the introduction of Amtrak's Pere Marquette trains between Chicago and Grand Rapids. In 2014, the Vernon J. Ehlers Station, Grand Rapids' new station, opened.

Preceding station	Chesapeake and Ohio Railway	Following station
Grandville toward Chicago	Pere Marquette Railway; Main Line	Terminus
Terminus	Grand Rapids – Bay City	McCord toward Bay City
Terminus	Grand Rapids – Bay View	Comstock Park toward Bay View
Terminus	Grand Rapids – Detroit	Fox toward Detroit
Preceding station	New York Central Railroad	Following station
Terminus	MCR Grand Rapids Branch	Dutton toward Jackson
Preceding station	Pennsylvania Railroad	Following station
Fuller toward Mackinaw City	Grand Rapids & Indiana Railway	Moline toward Richmond
