= Fort Street Union Depot =

Former Train Station In Detroit, MI

Coordinates: 42.3273°N 83.0545°W

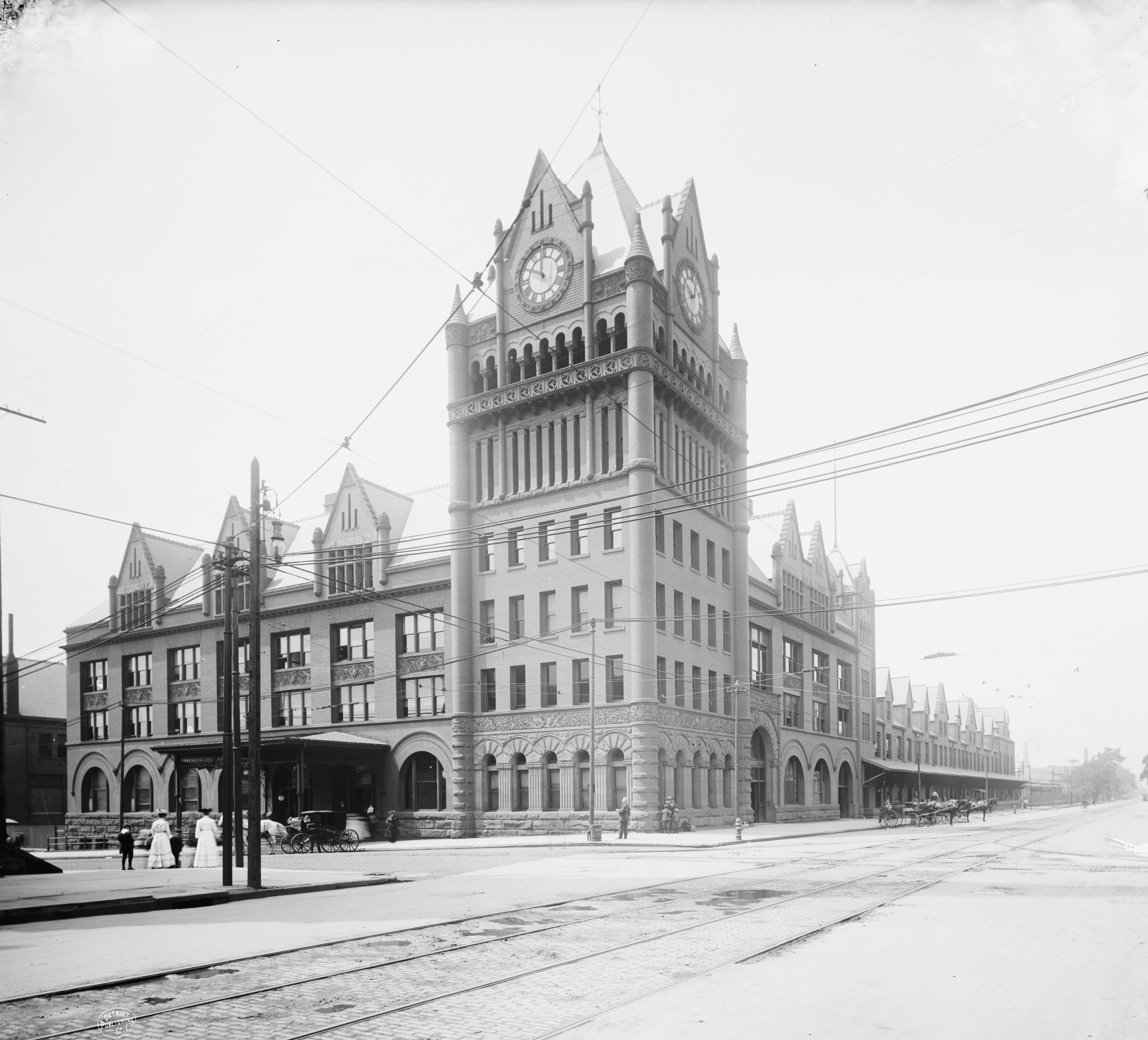
- The Fort Street Union Depot in 1909

General information
- Location: Detroit, Michigan; United States

Other information
- Status: Demolished

History
- Closed: April 30, 1971

Former services
Preceding station	Baltimore and Ohio Railroad	Following station
Monroe toward Cincinnati	Toledo Division before 1946	Terminus
Preceding station	Chesapeake and Ohio Railway	Following station
Oak toward Grand Rapids	Grand Rapids – Detroit	Terminus
Plymouth toward Bay City	Bay City – Detroit	Terminus
Terminus	Detroit – Toledo (Note: Ludington–Toledo direct service before 1930s as part of Pere Marquette Railway. Service previously bypassed Detroit via Plymouth)	Wayne toward Toledo
Preceding station	Detroit, Toledo and Ironton Railroad	Following station
Terminus	Main Line 1930–1932	Delray toward Ironton
Preceding station	Pennsylvania Railroad	Following station
Monroe toward Mansfield	Toledo Division	Terminus
Preceding station	Wabash Railroad	Following station
Delray toward Chicago	Chicago – Buffalo	Windsor toward Buffalo
Delray toward St. Louis	St. Louis – Detroit	Terminus
Location

The Fort Street Union Depot was a passenger train station located at the southwest corner of West Fort Street and Third Street in downtown Detroit, Michigan. It served the city from 1893 to 1971, then was demolished in 1974. Today, the downtown campus of Wayne County Community College occupies the site.

== History ==
The union station began construction in 1891 and opened to the public January 21, 1893. It consolidated the operations and services of several rail companies serving Detroit like Baltimore and Ohio, Pere Marquette (later Chesapeake and Ohio), Pennsylvania, and Wabash. It was not utilised by New York Central Railroad and Canadian Pacific Railway, which used Michigan Central Station, and the Grand Trunk Western Railroad, which used Brush Street Station. The Baltimore & Ohio Railroad used the Fort Street facility intermittently. B&O never had its own tracks between Toledo and Detroit. When Pere Marquette (then later C&O which had acquired PM) handled B&O trains north of Toledo, those trains went to Fort Street. When handled by Michigan Central (later New York Central) they went to Michigan Central Station. Upon its opening, the station was located in a transportation district which included the original Michigan Central Railroad Depot two blocks south, and the Detroit and Cleveland Navigation Company nearby on the Detroit River.

The station was extensively renovated in 1946, adding a restaurant, fluorescent lighting, a baggage room, train gates and other updated amenities. Urban renewal in the 1950s saw the construction of Cobo Hall to the south of the station, and the tunneling of the Lodge Freeway beneath the railway tracks. However, due to dwindling ridership, and with the founding of Amtrak, the station closed April 30, 1971, and despite the attempts of preservationists to repurpose the building, was demolished in January 1974.

== Architecture ==
The depot was built in the Romanesque Revival architectural style by architect James Stewart, a follower of Henry Hobson Richardson. "The depot was described by architectural critics as monumental and gutsy, and of being in a solid, aggressive style. W. Hawkins Ferry, in his The Buildings of Detroit, described the station as being of 'robust plastic composition'. Ross and Carlin mention it proudly as 'an ornament to the city' in their Landmarks of Detroit, published before the turn of the century."

== Service ==
Several named passenger trains departed from the station; many were long-distance flagship trains of their respective railroads. The Pere Marquette had unnamed service to Bay City via Flint and Saginaw.

Operators	Named trains	Destination	Year discontinued
Baltimore and Ohio Railroad	Ambassador	Baltimore	1946 (Note: Moved to Michigan Central Station in 1946)
Baltimore and Ohio Railroad	Capitol-Detroit, successor to connecting service to Shenandoah	Washington, D.C.	1946
Baltimore and Ohio Railroad	Cincinnatian	Cincinnati	1946
Baltimore and Ohio Railroad	Night Express	Cincinnati	1946
Chesapeake and Ohio Railway	Sportsman	Newport News, Virginia	1968
Pennsylvania Railroad	Red Arrow	Washington, D.C., and New York, New York	1959
Pennsylvania Railroad and Wabash Railroad	Chicago Arrow	Chicago	1949
Pere Marquette Railway, Chesapeake & Ohio Railway after 1947 merger	Pere Marquette	Grand Rapids, Michigan	1971
Pere Marquette Railway	Resort Special	Bay View, Michigan	1948
Wabash Railroad	St. Louis Limited	St. Louis, Missouri	1968
Wabash Railroad	Wabash Cannon Ball	St. Louis, Missouri	1971

== Remnants ==
Parts of the structure are housed at the National Museum of Railroad History & Innovation in Baltimore, Maryland. Several large pieces from the station have been saved in a warehouse in nearby Fort Wayne.

== See also ==
- Brush Street Station
- Michigan Central Station
