= Bay City station =

- Pere Marquette Railroad Depot, Bay City Station
- U.S. National Register of Historic Places
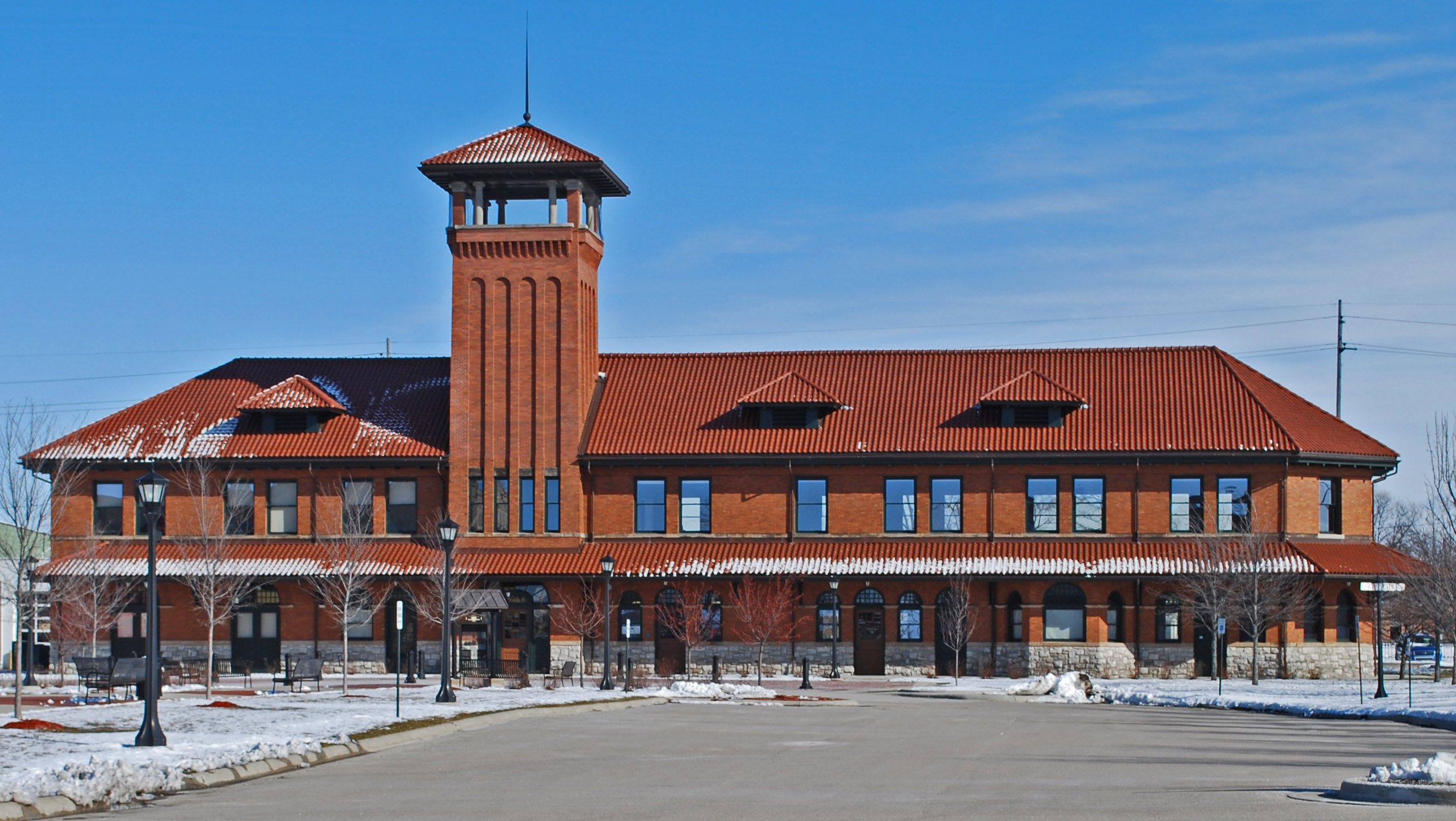

- Location within Michigan Location within the United States
- Interactive map
- Location: 919 Boutell Pl., Bay City, Michigan
- Coordinates: 43°36′0″N 83°53′6″W
- Area: 1 acre (0.40 ha)
- Built: 1903
- Architect: William T. Cooper
- NRHP reference No.: 82002828
- Added to NRHP: April 15, 1982

The Bay City Station of the Pere Marquette Railway, also known as The Depot Building, is a former railroad depot located at 919 Boutell Place in Bay City, Michigan. It was listed on the National Register of Historic Places in 1982.

== History ==
The Pere Marquette Railway was established in 1863, and ran its first line between Flint and Saginaw. They extended the line to Ludington, and then looked to extend further into the Saginaw Valley. Meanwhile, investors in Bay City had formed the Bay City and East Saginaw Railroad Company to lay a separate line. Seeing the potential, the Pere Marquette purchased the Bay City and East Saginaw line in 1867. The first train pulled into Bay City on November 23, 1867.

By 1899, the Pere Marquette had merged with other railways and was the largest in Michigan. They built several new passenger and freight depots over the next few years. That includes this depot, which opened in 1904, and was designed by Saginaw architect William T. Cooper.

The building remained in use for both passenger and freight service until about 1951, after which it was abandoned. In 1953, the Depot was renovated for use by the Greyhound Bus Company, who removed the tower above the roofline, as well as the porte cochere. The bus company vacated the building in 1969, and it remained vacant until 2003. At that time, the Great Lakes Center Foundation purchased the Depot and began plans to restore it. Restoration work got underway in 2007, and the tower and porte cohere were replaced. Tenants moved in the following year.

== Description ==
The Depot Building is a rectangular, two-story, red brick building with limestone trim. It measures 24 feet by 88 feet. The depot sits on a random ashlar base, and has a low-pitched hipped roof with extended eaves. Windows and doors are in rounded arch openings, and dormers pierce the roof. The main facade, which once faced the tracks, is asymmetrical with an entry bay containing a rounded arch door on the first floor and four one-over-one double-hung windows on the second. additional doors and windows and a three-sided bay are on the first floor. Above is a limestone bandcourse separating the first and second floors, and pairs of one-over-one double-hung windows are on the second floor.

== Services ==
Preceding station	Chesapeake and Ohio Railway	Following station
Columbus Avenue toward Grand Rapids	Grand Rapids – Bay City	Terminus
Terminus	Bay City – Detroit (Note: Ludington–Toledo direct service before 1930s as part of Pere Marquette Railway. Service previously bypassed Detroit via Plymouth)	South Bay City toward Detroit
Columbus Avenue toward Saginaw (West Shore)	PM Saginaw – Bay City	Terminus
