= Toledo Division =

Railway line in Michigan and Ohio

The Toledo Division was the southern half of the Pere Marquette Railway's main line, which ran from Ludington, Michigan (on the coast of Lake Michigan) to Toledo, Ohio (on the coast of Lake Erie). The Toledo Division encompassed the portion which ran from Toledo north to Saginaw, Michigan, where it met the Ludington Division. The line was built by a predecessor of the PM, the Flint & Pere Marquette, and is currently owned by CSX Transportation.

== Structure ==
The main line of the Toledo Division ran south from Saginaw to Alexis, Ohio, just north of Toledo, for a total length of 130.35 miles (209.78 km). Toledo marked the southern extent of the Pere Marquette; north of Saginaw the main line continued as the Ludington Division.

The tracks of the Toledo Division crossed numerous other railroads between Saginaw and Toledo, including:

- The now-abandoned Saginaw Branch of the Michigan Central at Hoyt, Saginaw.
- The Chicago Division of the Grand Trunk Western at Flint.
- The Detroit Division of the Grand Trunk Western at Holly.
- The Jackson Subdivision of the Grand Trunk Western at Wixom. The Grand Truk Western abandoned the westward portion in 1984 and sold the eastern segment to Coe Rail.
- The Detroit Division of the Michigan Central at Wayne. This line is now operated by the Norfolk Southern.
- The Main Line of the Wabash at Romulus. This line is now operated by the Norfolk Southern.
- The Main Line of the DT&I at Carleton. This line is now operated by the Grand Trunk Western.
- The now-abandoned Monroe Branch of the LS&MS at Monroe.

== Current status ==
In 1947 the Pere Marquette merged into the Chesapeake & Ohio, which in turn eventually became CSX Transportation. CSX still owns the Toledo-Saginaw line, which forms the Saginaw Subdivision, but in 2005 leased the section from Mount Morris to Saginaw to the Saginaw Bay Southern Railway, a short-line railroad. CSX continues to operate the Flint-Toledo segment directly.
