= Red Arrow (PRR train) =

American night train

Overview
- Service type: Inter-city rail
- Status: discontinued
- Locale: Midwestern United States/Mid-Atlantic States
- First service: 1925
- Last service: 1960
- Former operator: Pennsylvania Railroad

Route
- Termini: Washington, D.C. and Philadelphia, Pennsylvania; Detroit, Michigan
- Distance travelled: 756.6 miles (1,217.6 km) Detroit-New York
- Service frequency: Daily
- Train numbers: 68 (eastbound), 69 (westbound); 574 (branch to Washington), 569 (from Washington)

On-board services
- Seating arrangements: coaches (1950)
- Sleeping arrangements: Sleeping cars: sections, roomettes, duplex rooms, double bedrooms, drawing room (1950)
- Catering facilities: Bar-lounge car -New York-Detroit, dining cars New York-Detroit and Washington to Harrisburg (1950)

The Red Arrow was a night train operated by the Pennsylvania Railroad that ran from New York City to Detroit. It was named after Michigan’s Red Arrow infantry division of World War I. It had an additional section going to and from Washington, D.C. This was an unusual train, in that the PRR had few trains that ran to Detroit. More of the PRR trains went west to Chicago or St. Louis. The Red Arrow became the premier PRR train on the New York–Detroit circuit although New York Central's Detroiter was faster and better known.

== History ==
The train began as an eastbound-only train, from Detroit to Pittsburgh in 1925. In the next year it went in both directions, #69, westbound, #68 eastbound. By 1938 the train was extended to New York and Washington, with the route split at Harrisburg, Pennsylvania. The Detroit terminus was the Fort Street Union Depot in downtown Detroit.

=== Route ===
Going south from Detroit, the route went through Toledo, Ohio, joined the PRR main line at Mansfield, Ohio, and continued east. In the easterly direction the train made a stop in Canton, Ohio. In the westbound direction the train made no stops between Pittsburgh and Mansfield.

=== Derailment ===
On February 18, 1947, the eastbound Red Arrow was derailed at Bennington Curve near Gallitzin, Pennsylvania, killing 22 of the 200 people on board at the time. The cause of the accident was determined to be excessive speed around the curve, derailing the two K4s steam locomotives and many of the passenger cars.

=== Decline ===
Between April 29, 1956 and July 26, 1959 the route was shrunk in steps, eventually to a local train between Detroit and Toledo. It had its last run on July 26, 1960.
