= Northern Arrow =

Overview
- Service type: Inter-city rail
- Status: Discontinued
- Locale: Midwestern United States
- Predecessor: Northland Express
- First service: 1935
- Last service: 1961
- Former operator: Pennsylvania Railroad

Route
- Termini: Cincinnati, Ohio, additional sections originating from Chicago and St. Louis; Mackinaw City, Michigan, additional sections to Harbor Springs
- Stops: 21
- Distance travelled: 533.5 miles (858.6 km) (1950)
- Average journey time: Northbound: 15 hrs 5 min Southbound: 14 hrs 40 min (1950)
- Service frequency: Daily (1950;1961)
- Train numbers: Northbound: 519; Southbound: 520

On-board services
- Seating arrangements: Reserved seat coach
- Sleeping arrangements: Sections and double bedrooms, drawing rooms and compartments (1950)
- Catering facilities: Dining car
- Entertainment facilities: Lounge car

Technical
- Track gauge: 4 ft 8 1/2 in (1,435 mm)

Northern Arrow was one of the named passenger trains of the Pennsylvania Railroad, starting at Cincinnati, Ohio and ending at Mackinaw City, Michigan. It had merging branches originating from Chicago, Illinois, converging in Fort Wayne, Indiana, and a train from St. Louis, Missouri from the west, converging at Richmond, Indiana. Carrying the number #519 northbound and #520 southbound, it used the Grand Rapids and Indiana Railroad, a leased subsidiary of the Pennsylvania system.

The train was frequented by northbound travelers to popular Northern Michigan resort destinations north of Grand Rapids, Michigan, such as Petoskey, Bay View (only northbound trains stopped there; it was the stop after Petoskey), Mackinaw City and Mackinac Island. One section of the Northern Arrow was a seasonal summer-only weekly service between Chicago and Mackinaw City. Additional northbound sleeper sections after leaving Petoskey diverged west to Harbor Springs.

The Northern Arrow ran express from Grand Rapids to Cadillac (albeit, available for flagstops and Reed City). The PRR ran a local counterpart from Grand Rapids to Mackinaw City (later cut back to Petoskey) which served the bypassed stations. The Chesapeake and Ohio Railway operated the Resort Special that served the Chicago to Petoskey market. For the Grand Rapids to Petoskey route, the Resort Special was a competitor with the Northern Arrow.

During World War II and immediately after, 1942–1946, the Northern Arrow was one of the named trains dropped from service. On May 26, 1950, the Northern Arrow was re-equipped with a lightweight lounge and sleeping cars plus a dining car decorated with Northern Michigan photomurals. It did not operate outside of the summer months, as there were no trains on the route north of Grand Rapids during the colder months.

The PRR ended its local counterpart service between 1954 and 1955.

Northern Arrow service ended in 1961. In 1976, the Michigan Department of Transportation initiated the Michigan Northern Railway, which operated passenger service from Grand Rapids to Mackinaw City until 1986.
