= Night Express (B&O train) =

Overview
- Service type: Inter-city rail
- Status: Discontinued
- Locale: Mid-West
- First service: 1960 [c.1921 as unnamed train]
- Last service: 1967
- Former operator: Baltimore and Ohio Railroad

Route
- Termini: Detroit, Michigan; Louisville, Kentucky
- Distance travelled: 257.5 miles (414.4 km) (1960)
- Service frequency: Daily
- Train numbers: 57 (southbound); 58 (northbound)

On-board services
- Seating arrangements: Reclining seat coach
- Sleeping arrangements: Roomettes, double bedrooms (1960)
- Catering facilities: Snack-lounge car

The Night Express was an American named train of the Baltimore and Ohio Railroad (B&O) on its route between Detroit, Michigan, and Louisville, Kentucky, with major station stops in Toledo, Ohio, and Cincinnati. The service was numbered Train 57 southbound and Train 58 northbound. The numbers 57/58 operated on the Detroit - Cincinnati line as early as 1921. The service was provided in conjunction with the Pere Marquette Railroad (and later, the Chesapeake and Ohio Railway) from Detroit to Toledo and with the Louisville and Nashville from Cincinnati to Louisville with connections to New Orleans.

The train went unnamed until 1960 when the B&O gave the name Night Express to the 57/58 Detroit-Louisville itinerary. In 1961 the southern terminus of the train route was shortened to Cincinnati's Union Terminal.

The Night Express had its Detroit beginning point in the New York Central's Michigan Central Station in Detroit 1963, when the B&O and the C&O merged and the B&O moved it to the Fort Street Union Depot in Detroit.

With the September 1967 schedule, the B&O dropped the train from service.

== Stations ==
| Station | State |
|---|---|
| Detroit (Michigan Central Station) | Michigan |
| Toledo (Central Union Terminal) | Ohio |
| Deshler | Ohio |
| Dayton (Union Station) | Ohio |
| Cincinnati (Union Terminal) | Ohio |
| Louisville (Central Station) | Kentucky |

== Schedule and equipment ==
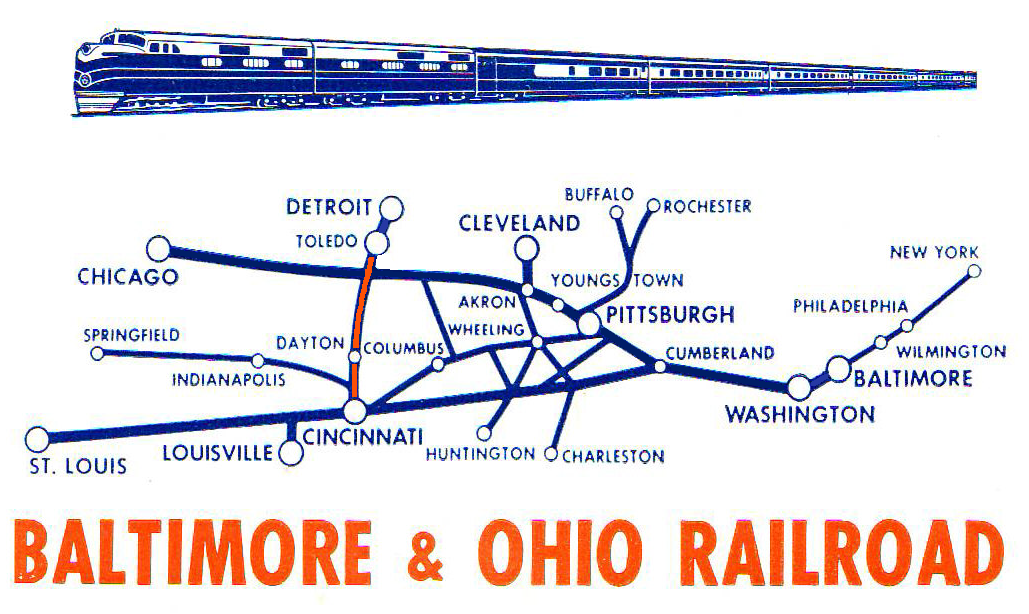
The route of the Night Express (in orange)

In 1947, southbound Night Express Train # 57 operated on the following schedule (departure times at principal stops shown):

| City | Departure time |
|---|---|
| Detroit (Michigan Central Station) | 11:50 p.m. (via Pere Marquette Railway) |
| Toledo, Ohio (Central Union Terminal) | 1:25 a.m. |
| Deshler, Ohio | 2:20 a.m. |
| Lima, Ohio (PRR station) | 3:15 a.m. |
| Dayton, Ohio (Union Station) | 5:13 a.m. |
| Cincinnati (Union Terminal) | 8:40 a.m. |
| Louisville, Ky. (Central Station) | 9:55 a.m. (via Louisville and Nashville Railroad |
source: Baltimore and Ohio System Timetable, July 6, 1947

In the 1940s, the southbound Night Express consisted of two or three head-end cars, an RPO baggage car, 12 sleepers. Between Cincinnati and Louisville there was a dining-lounge car.
