= Pere Marquette (C&O train) =

American streamlined passenger train

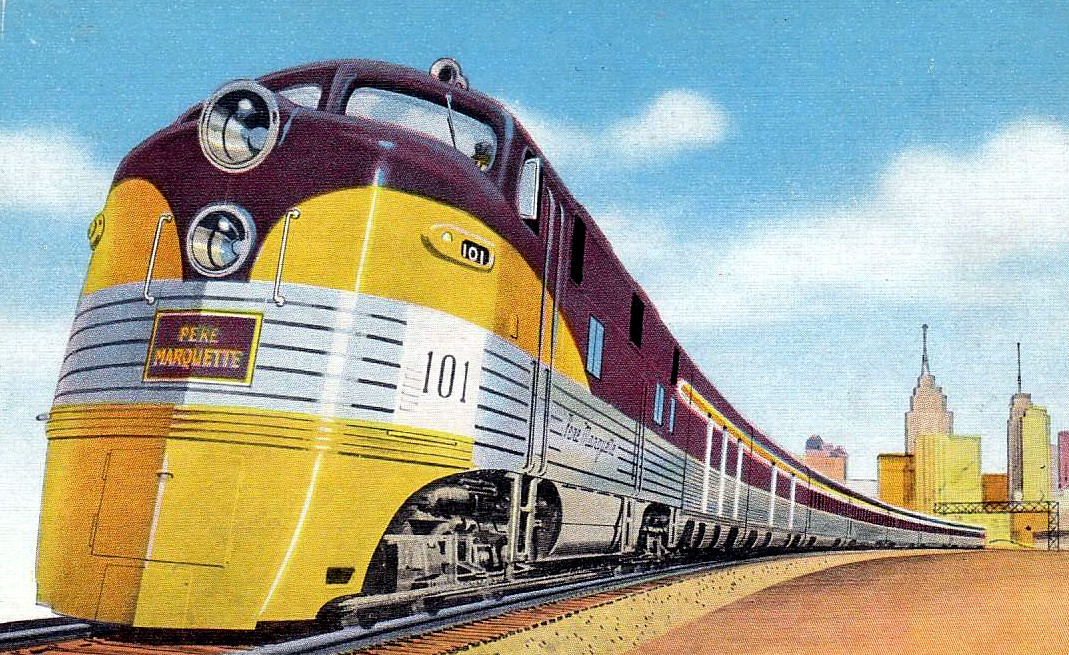
- A postcard depicts the Pere Marquette departing Detroit in the late 1940s.

Overview
- Service type: Inter-city rail
- Status: Discontinued
- Locale: Midwestern United States
- First service: August 10, 1946
- Last service: April 30, 1971
- Successor: Pere Marquette
- Former operators: Pere Marquette Railway (1946–1947); Chesapeake and Ohio Railway (1947–1971)

Route
- Termini: Detroit, Michigan; Grand Rapids, Michigan
- Distance travelled: 153 miles (246 km)

The Pere Marquette was a streamlined passenger train operated by the Pere Marquette Railway and its successor the Chesapeake and Ohio Railway (C&O) between Detroit and Grand Rapids, Michigan. It operated from 1946 to 1971. It was the first new streamliner to enter service after World War II. Although discontinued in 1971 on the formation of Amtrak, in 1984 Amtrak revived the name for a new train between Chicago, Illinois and Grand Rapids.

== History ==
The Pere Marquette Railway introduced the Pere Marquette between Detroit's Fort Street Union Depot and Grand Rapids Union Station on August 10, 1946. Pullman-Standard delivered two lightweight seven-car consists enabling three daily round trips. Each set consisted of a baggage/mail car, baggage car, two chair-observation cars, two chair-lounge cars, and a dining car. The train seated 220 in the four chair cars, and had space for 44 in the dining car. The innovative railroad executive Robert R. Young had a hand in the establishment of the Pere Marquette and introduced several operational changes, including phoning ahead for reservations and paying for tickets aboard the trains, as opposed to at the station. The Pere Marquette Railway experienced a surge in ridership after the trains began operation. New EMD E7 diesel locomotives pulled the trains. The trains covered the 153 miles (246 km) between Grand Rapids and Fort Street Union Depot in Detroit in under three hours. Connecting service to Chicago was available in Grand Rapids. Other streamlined trains had debuted since 1945, but the Pere Marquette was the first using equipment built after World War II.

The Chesapeake and Ohio Railway, which had controlled the Pere Marquette Railway for years, formally absorbed the company in 1947. On November 21, 1948, the C&O used new lightweight equipment from the Budd Company to establish new streamliners between Grand Rapids and Chicago. This equipment was surplus from another of Robert Young's projects, the abortive Chessie, a proposed luxury streamliner. In 1950 new equipment from Pullman-Standard replaced the 1946 cars, which the C&O sold to the Chicago and Eastern Illinois Railroad (C&EI).

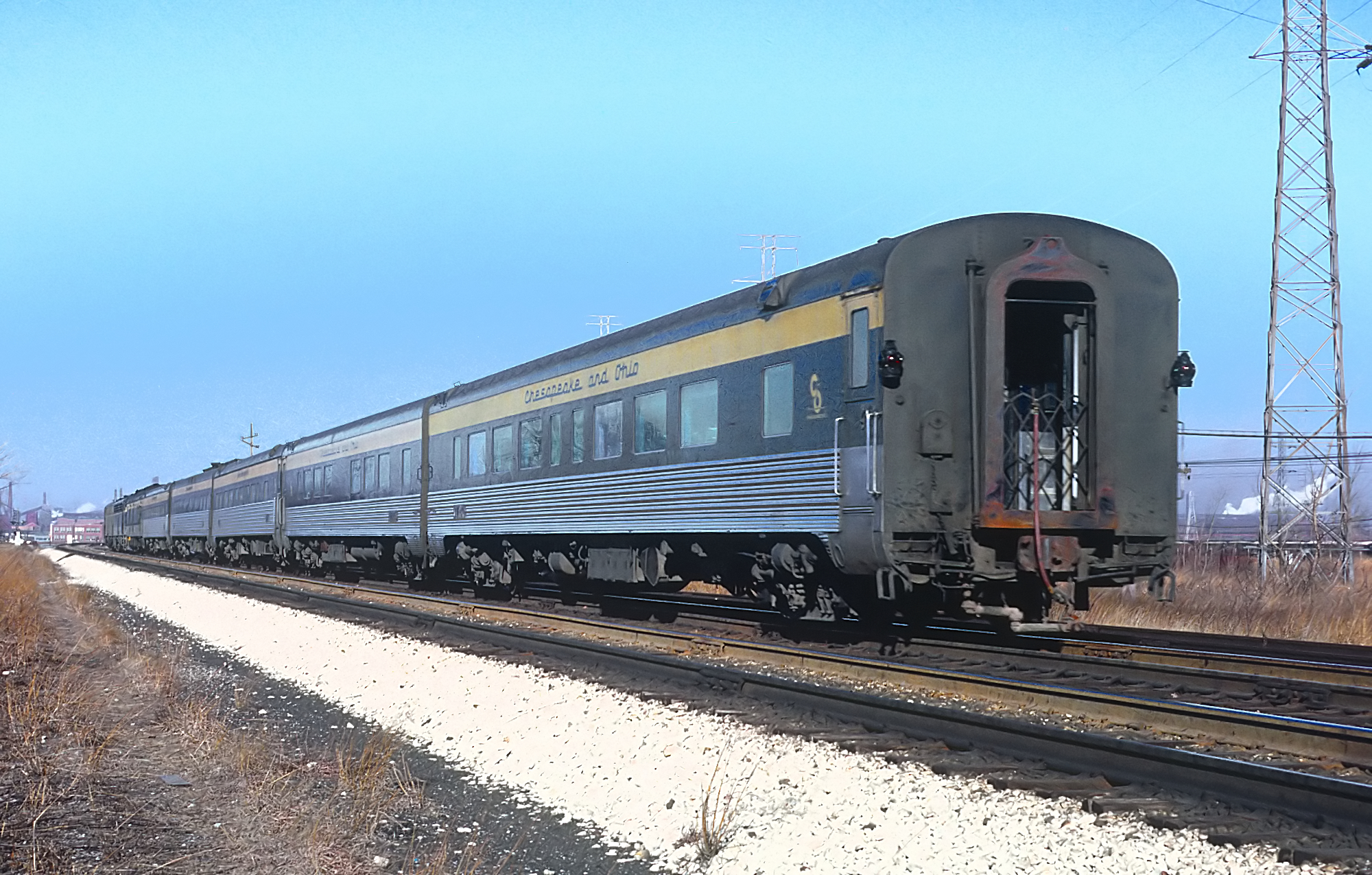
The Chesapeake and Ohio's Pere Marquette, near Gary, Ind. on November 26, 1965

The C&O applied the Pere Marquette name to the Chicago trains in 1965. At Amtrak's inception there was a single round-trip between Chicago and Grand Rapids, two between Grand Rapids and Detroit, and a connecting train between Holland, Michigan and Muskegon, Michigan. All were discontinued.

Amtrak revived the name on August 5, 1984, with the Pere Marquette, a daily service between Chicago and Grand Rapids.
