= Rainbow Special =

Overview
- Service type: Inter-city rail
- Status: Discontinued
- Locale: South Central United States
- First service: 1921
- Former operator: Missouri Pacific Railroad

Route
- Termini: Kansas City, Missouri; Little Rock, Arkansas

Technical
- Track gauge: 1,435 mm (4 ft 8 1/2 in)

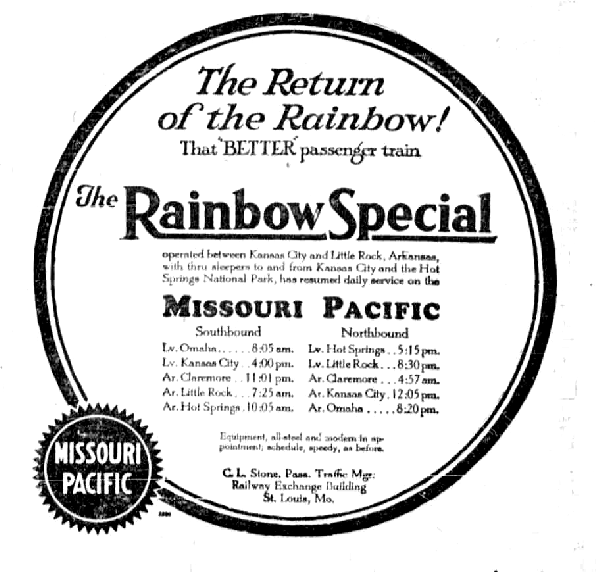
Newspaper ad for the train, showing the schedule. 1922

The Rainbow Special was a "fast train" operating over the Missouri Pacific between Kansas City, Missouri, and Hot Springs, Arkansas, (later extended to Little Rock, Arkansas). The service was introduced in 1921.
