= Resort Special =

Seasonal train

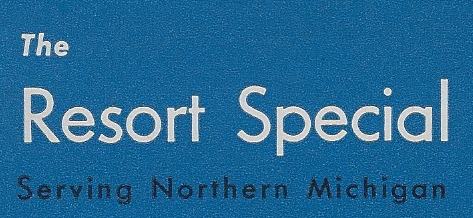
- Resort Special having highlighted notice in 1948 C&O timetable

Overview
- Service type: Inter-city rail
- Status: Discontinued
- Locale: Mid-West
- First service: 1904 c. 1963 (second incarnation)
- Last service: 1957 c. 1968 (second incarnation)
- Former operator(s): Pere Marquette Railway; Chesapeake and Ohio Railway

Route
- Termini: Chicago, Illinois and Detroit, Michigan; Bay View, Michigan
- Distance travelled: 411.3 miles (661.9 km), Chicago-Bay View; 379.5 miles (610.7 km), Detroit-Bay View (1941)
- Service frequency: (summer-time)
- Train number(s): 9 (southbound); 10 (northbound)

On-board services
- Seating arrangements: Reclining seat coach
- Sleeping arrangements: Sections, Roomettes, double bedrooms, drawing rooms and compartments (1941)
- Catering facilities: Dining lounge car
- Observation facilities: Club car

The Resort Special was a seasonal night train from Chicago, renowned for serving resort towns such as Traverse City, Charlevoix, Petoskey on the northwestern part of Michigan’s lower peninsula. Begun by the Pere Marquette Railway, it was a rare instance of a named Pere Marquette train continuing after the Chesapeake & Ohio absorbed the Pere Marquette Railway in 1947. In 1960s, the C&O shifted the Resort Special name to a White Sulphur Springs, West Virginia to New York City route.

== Early extent of route ==
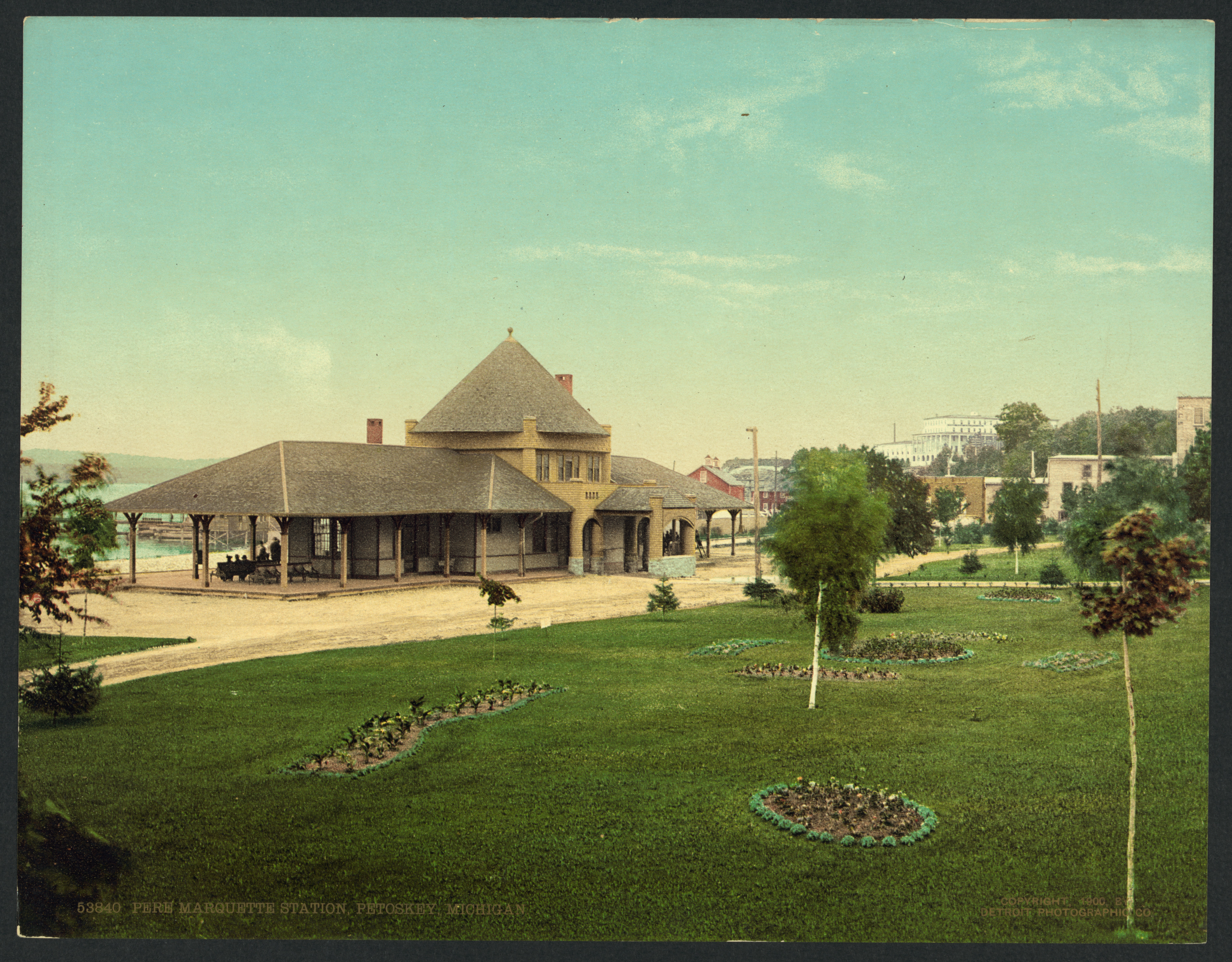
Pere Marquette's (later, C&O's) Petoskey Depot, 1900; the Northern Michigan route's terminus in final years.

The Pere Marquette (and later the C&O) operated coach and Pullman service on this western Michigan route for nearly six decades. It had two origin points by June 1921, from Chicago (Grand Central Station), and from Detroit (Fort Street Union Depot). The sections from both cities joined in Grand Rapids and proceeded north to Baldwin, Traverse City, Petoskey and Bay View. Normally, all trains on this division of track ended at Petoskey, however, the Resort Special was the last remaining passenger train to use the segment from Petoskey to Bay View.

Noteworthy resort locations en route were the Idlewild resort for African-Americans during the Jim Crow era, five miles to the east of Baldwin, the National Music Camp for young musicians and the Interlochen State Park in Interlochen and the Methodist revival camp in Bay View.

1948 was the last summer that the train, #10 northbound, #9 southbound, went all the way to Bay View. In 1949 it was shortened to Petoskey. Also that year, the Detroit section was eliminated from the train. However, the train resumed serving Baldwin. In 1957 the C&O eliminated this named train from this route.

The PM's Petoskey Division also included regular year-round service trains that served local stations that the Resort Special bypassed. As late as the April, 1961 timetable, the C&O was running trains as far north as Petoskey. Despite the PM’s earlier dropping of the name from the train, the C&O continued to run #7 and #10 in summer, 1963 as unnamed through sleepers from and to Traverse City, the northern terminus of PM passenger service on the division by that point.

== Rerouting ==
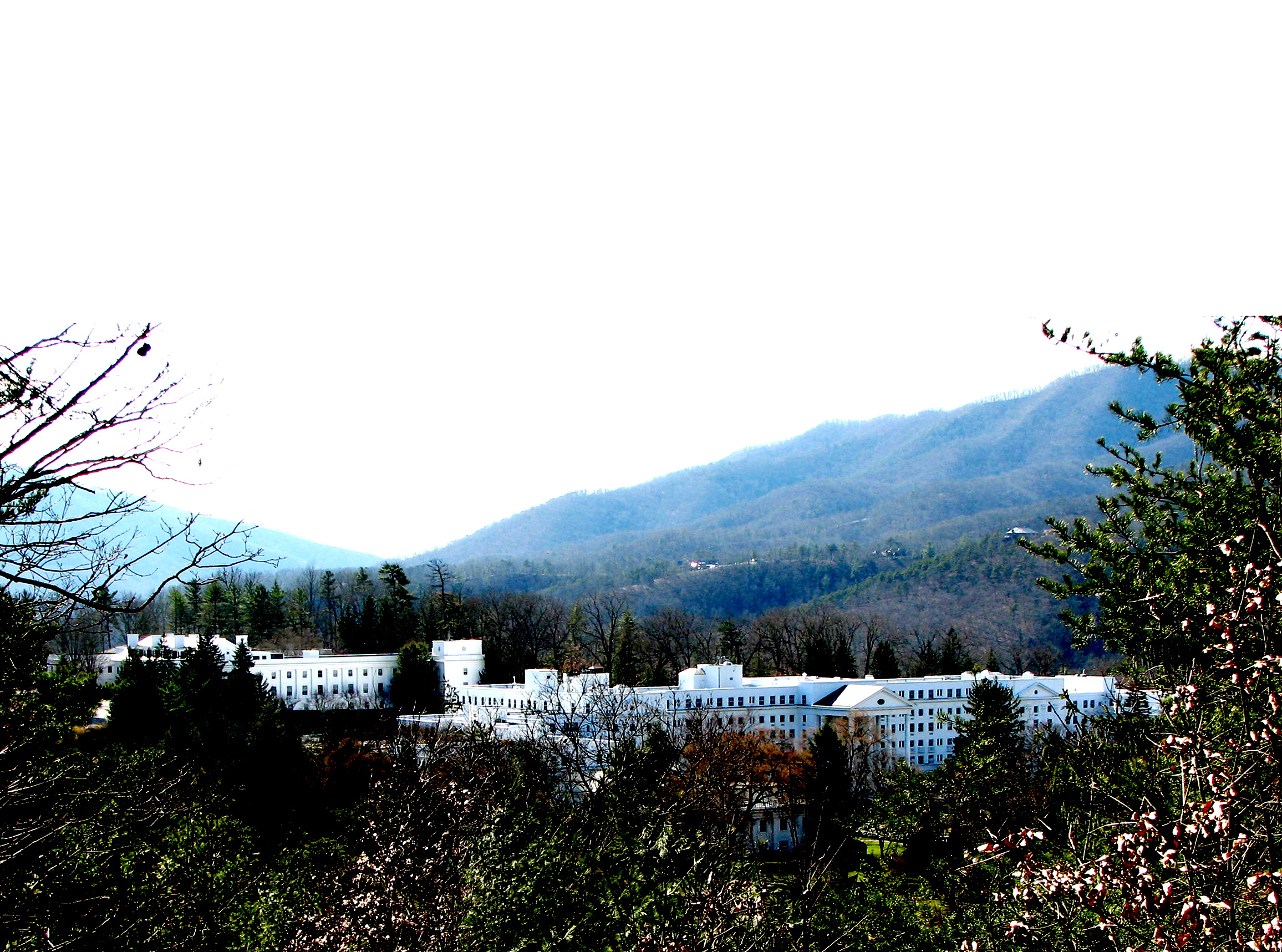
The C&O's expansive Greenbrier resort complex, nestled in the Allegheny Mountains.

In the mid-1960s the C&O rejuvenated the name in an April - June and September - October two night a week eastbound only White Sulphur Springs, West Virginia-New York City all-Pullman train, running express from Covington, Virginia to Washington. White Sulphur Springs is the site of the C&O-owned five-star resort, The Greenbrier. (The Pennsylvania Railroad's #108 Edison carried the sleeping cars for the Washington-New York portion of the route.)

== See also ==
- History of railroads in Michigan
