= Pere Marquette Railway =

U.S. Class I railway (1900–1947)

Overview
- Headquarters: Cleveland, Ohio
- Reporting mark: PM
- Locale: Illinois, Indiana, Michigan, Ohio, Ontario, New York, and Wisconsin
- Dates of operation: 1900–1947
- Successor: Chesapeake and Ohio later CSX

Technical
- Track gauge: 4 ft 8 1/2 in (1,435 mm) standard gauge

The Pere Marquette Railway (reporting mark PM) was a railroad that operated in the Great Lakes region of the United States and southern parts of Ontario in Canada. It had trackage in the states of Michigan, Ohio, Indiana, and the Canadian province of Ontario. Its primary connections included Buffalo; Toledo; and Chicago. The company was named after Jacques Marquette, a French Jesuit missionary who founded Michigan's first European settlement, Sault Ste Marie.

== History ==
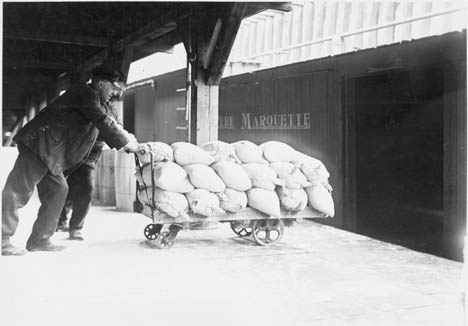
Loading salt into a Pere Marquette boxcar

The Pere Marquette was incorporated on November 1, 1899, in anticipation of a merger of three Michigan-based railroad companies that had been agreed upon by all parties. It began operations on January 1, 1900, absorbing the following companies:

- Flint & Pere Marquette Railroad (F&PM)
- Detroit, Grand Rapids & Western Railroad (DGR&W)
- Chicago & West Michigan Railway (C&WM)

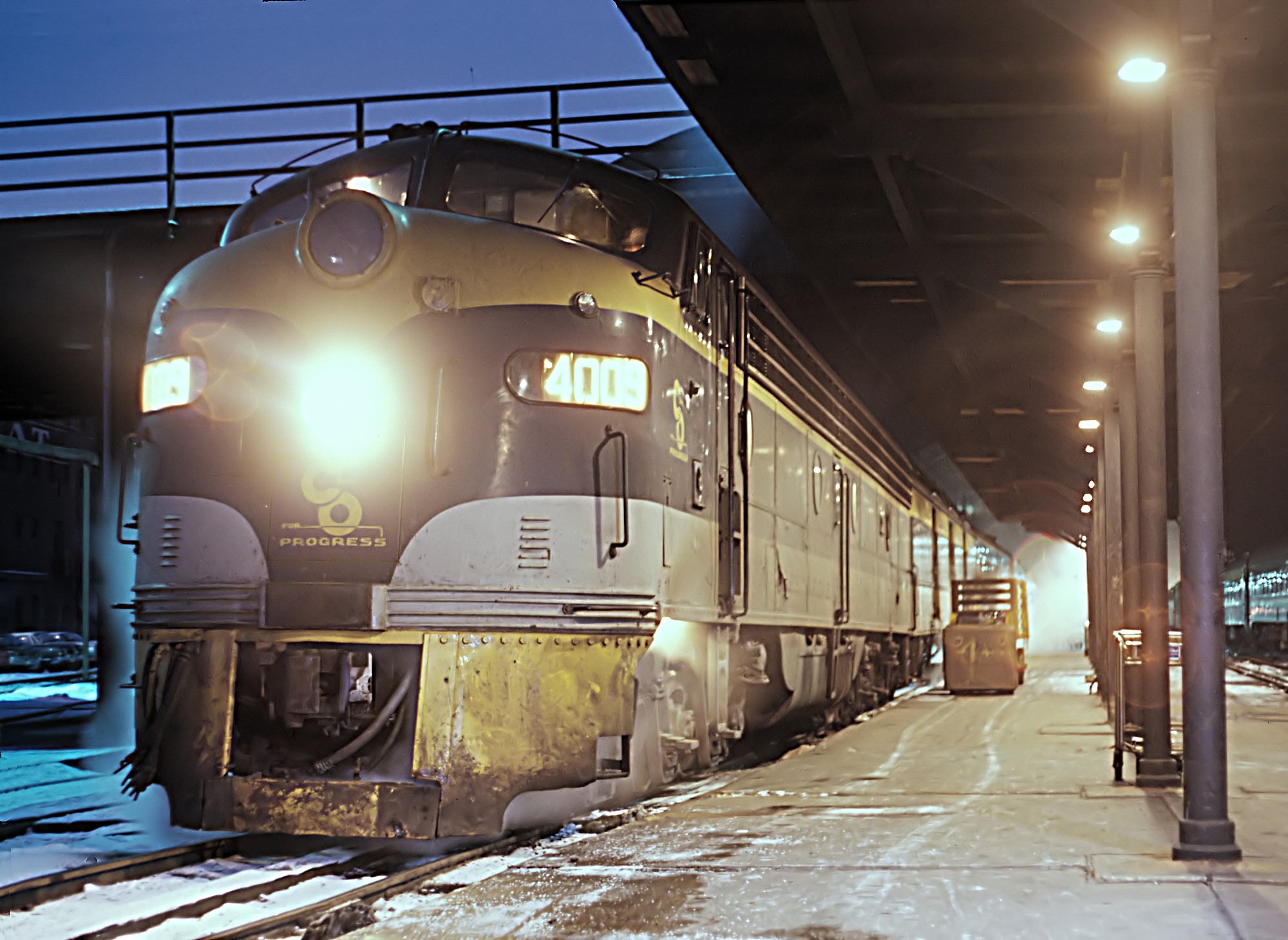
C&O's The Pere Marquette at Grand Central Station in Chicago on December 26, 1967

The first shop facilities were inherited from the Flint and Pere Marquette in Saginaw, Michigan. However, the city of Grand Rapids, Michigan was chosen as the primary repair facility for rolling stock in 1905, which became known as the Wyoming Shops after the neighborhood in which they were located. Wyoming Yard was one of the system's primary freight classification yards. The shops were renovated and expanded in 1923 after those of Saginaw were downgraded, and converted to service diesel engines in 1946. The massive roundhouse began to be slowly demolished in the 1970s and finally removed completely by CSX by 1984.

The company was reincorporated on March 12, 1917, as the Pere Marquette Railway. In the 1920s the Pere Marquette came under the control of Cleveland financiers Oris and Mantis Van Sweringen. These brothers also controlled the New York, Chicago & St. Louis Railroad (Nickel Plate), the Erie Railroad and the Chesapeake & Ohio Railway, and planned to merge the four companies. However, the ICC did not approve the merger and the Van Sweringens eventually sold their interest in the Pere Marquette to the C&O in 1929. The company continued to operate separately as the Pere Marquette Railway until being fully merged into the C&O on June 6, 1947. Forty years later, the C&O was absorbed into CSX Transportation.

In 1984, Amtrak named its passenger train between Chicago and Grand Rapids, Michigan, the Pere Marquette.

The locomotive in the 2004 film The Polar Express was modeled after steam locomotive Pere Marquette 1225. The film also included audio recordings of #1225 in operation. It is the locomotive that Chris Van Allsburg said was the inspiration for the book, having seen it as a child when it was on the Michigan State University campus. The locomotive was scheduled to be at the premiere in Grand Rapids, where the writer was born, but was canceled because of interferences with the schedule of CSX. It is now housed and maintained at the Steam Railroading Institute in Owosso, Michigan.

=== Surviving steam locomotives ===
- PM 1223 - 2-8-4 "Berkshire" displayed at Chinook Pier in Grand Haven, Michigan. PM 1223 is the oldest surviving example of the 2-8-4s in America.
- PM 1225 - 2-8-4 "Berkshire" operational by the Steam Railroading Institute in Owosso, Michigan. PM 1225 appears in motion-capture form in the 2004 Christmas movie The Polar Express.

== 1907 wreck ==
On July 20, 1907, an excursion train carrying 800 passengers from Ionia to Detroit collided near Salem with a freight train, killing 31 and injuring 101. The accident apparently happened because of a hand-written schedule on unlined paper whose columns did not line up, and was misread by the freight crew. The Interstate Commerce Commission investigation also cited safety violations, including use of pine instead of oak for car walls and the omission of steel plates required for mail cars. This was Michigan's worst rail disaster.

== Routes and current disposition ==
- Toledo Division – Saginaw, Michigan, to Alexis and (via trackage rights over Ann Arbor Railroad) Toledo, Ohio (In use by CSX Transportation south of Plymouth, leased to Lake State Railway north of Plymouth)
- Ludington Division – Saginaw to Ludington, Michigan (Partially now part of the Pere Marquette Rail-Trail, between Baldwin and Ludington in use with Marquette Rail, and Saginaw to Midland used by Lake State Railway Company, with the rest of the line removed in 1991; the ferry closed in 1990)
- Detroit Division – Detroit to Grand Rapids, Michigan (In use by CSX)
- Grand Rapids Division – Elmdale, Michigan, to Saginaw (Alma-Saginaw in use by Mid-Michigan Railroad)
- Chicago Division – Grand Rapids to Porter, Indiana, and (via trackage rights over various lines) Chicago (In use by CSX)
  - La Crosse Branch – New Buffalo, Michigan, to La Crosse, Indiana (Abandoned north of Wellsboro, Indiana, by C&O in 1989, most tracks removed; Wellsboro to La Crosse in use by the Chesapeake and Indiana Railroad)
- Petoskey Division – Grand Rapids to Bay View, Michigan, was the basis for the Pere Marquette's longest route, the Chicago and Detroit-Bay View Resort Special. (In use by Marquette Rail between Grand Rapids and Manistee and by the Great Lakes Central Railroad between Grawn and Williamsburg, with the rest dismantled in 1983 after being abandoned by C&O in 1982)
- Canadian Division – Lines in Canada, including Windsor, Ontario, and Sarnia, Ontario, via Blenheim, Ontario, to St. Thomas, Ontario, and St Thomas east to Buffalo, New York, via trackage rights over the Canada Southern (Toronto, Hamilton and Buffalo Railway trackage rights over CASO from Welland, Ontario, to Buffalo via Niagara Falls, Ontario).
- Saginaw Subdivisions – Saginaw to Port Huron, Michigan, via two routes and to Bay City, Michigan (Mostly abandoned between 1951 and 1988, some sections in use with the Huron and Eastern Railway)

== Historic photographs ==
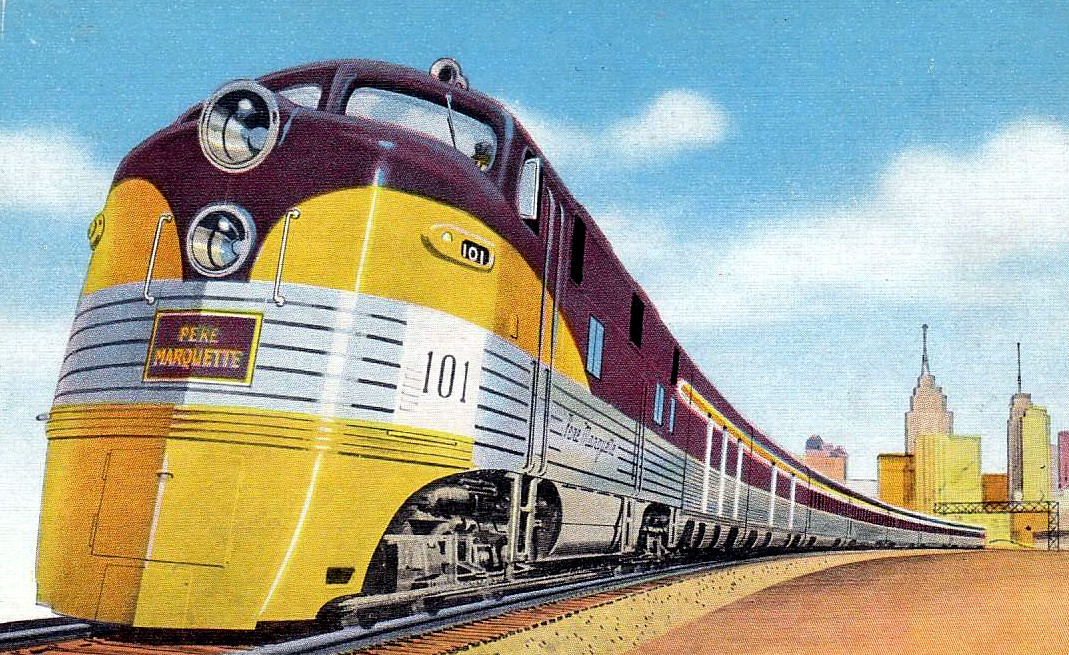
Postcard depiction of the line's streamliners, the Pere Marquette.

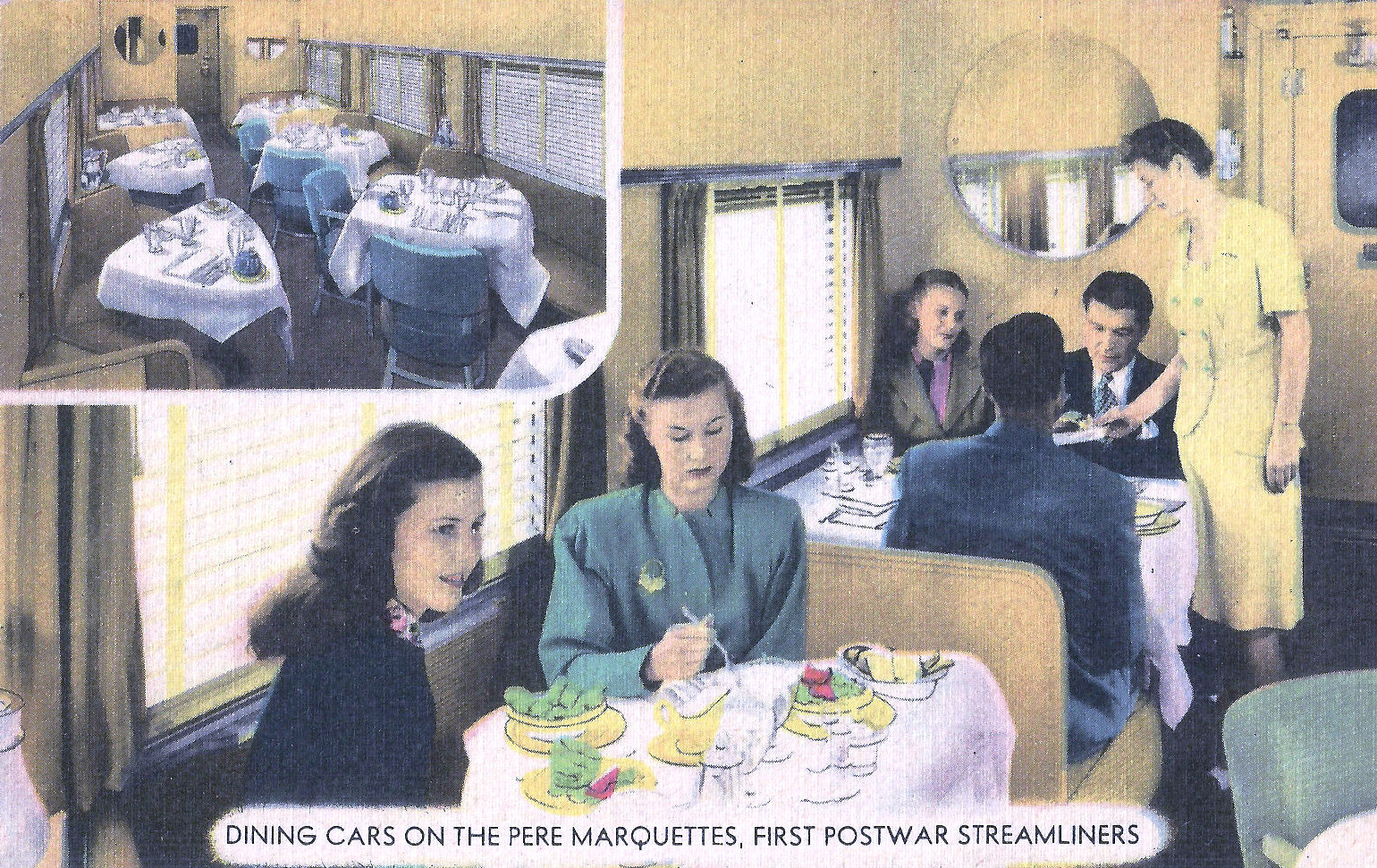
Postcard of one of the railroad's dining cars.

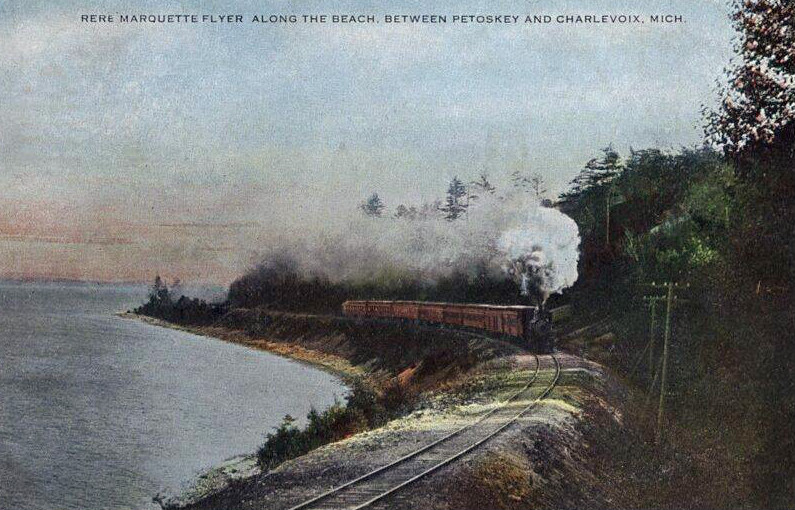
A Pere Marquette Flyer c. 1910.

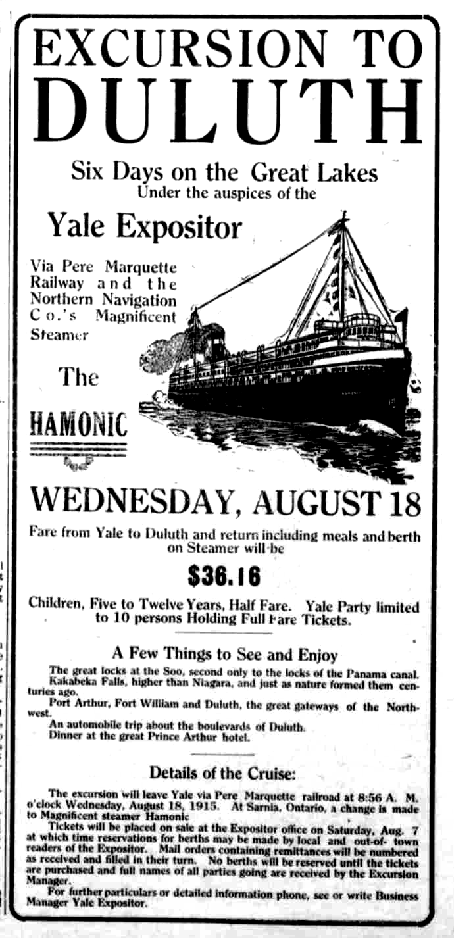
Ad for a Pere Marquette cruise to Duluth, 1905.

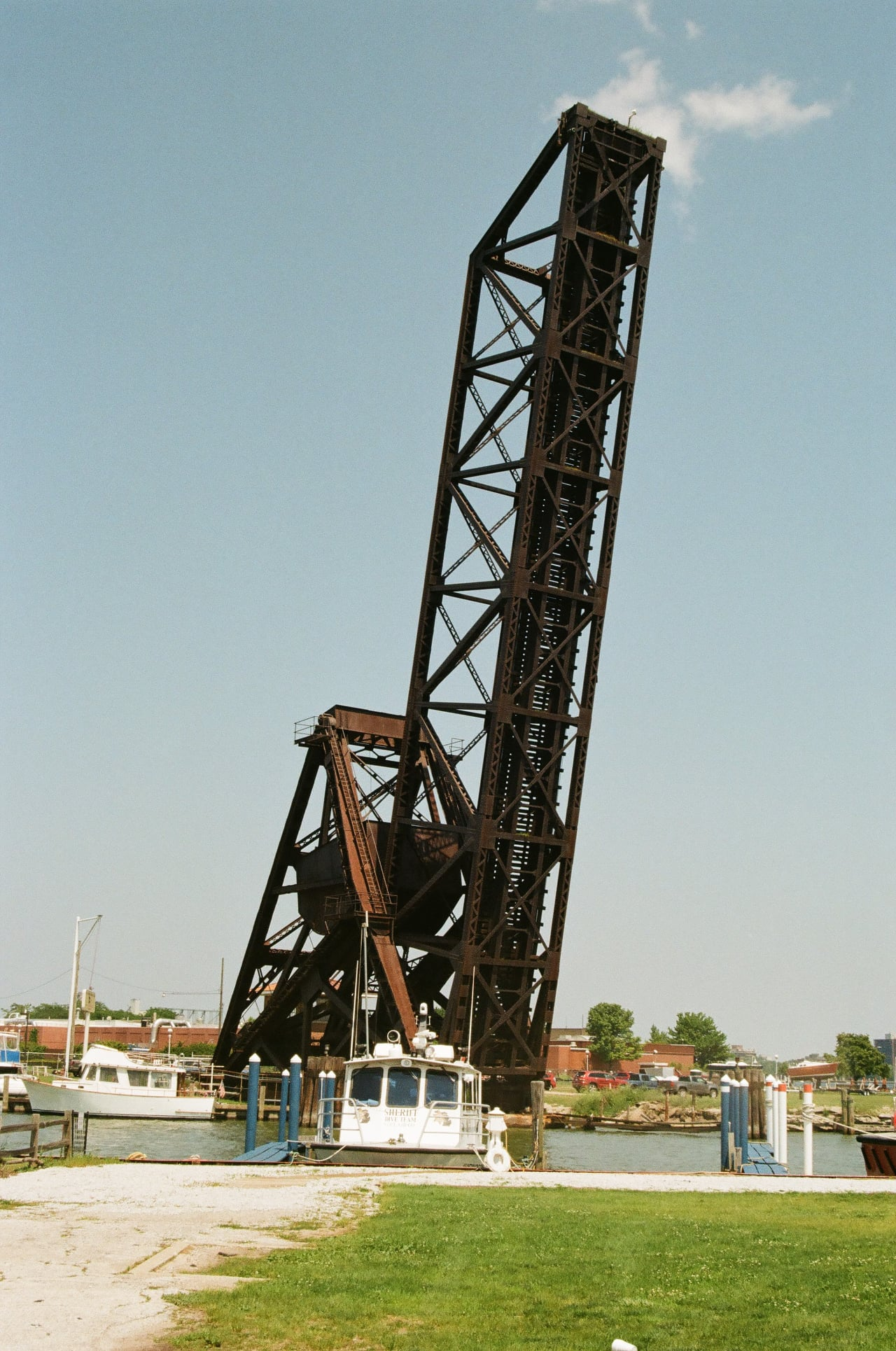
The Pere Marquette Railway bridge in Port Huron, Michigan, as seen in 2021. It was demolished in 2023.

== Car ferries ==
The Pere Marquette operated a number of rail car ferries on the Detroit and St. Clair rivers and on Lake Erie and Lake Michigan. The PM's fleet of car ferries, which operated on Lake Michigan from Ludington, Michigan, to Milwaukee, Kewaunee, and Manitowoc, Wisconsin (see SS Badger), were an important transportation link avoiding the terminal and interchange delays around the southern tip of Lake Michigan and through Chicago. Their superintendent for over 30 years was William L. Mercereau.

=== Pere Marquette 18 ===
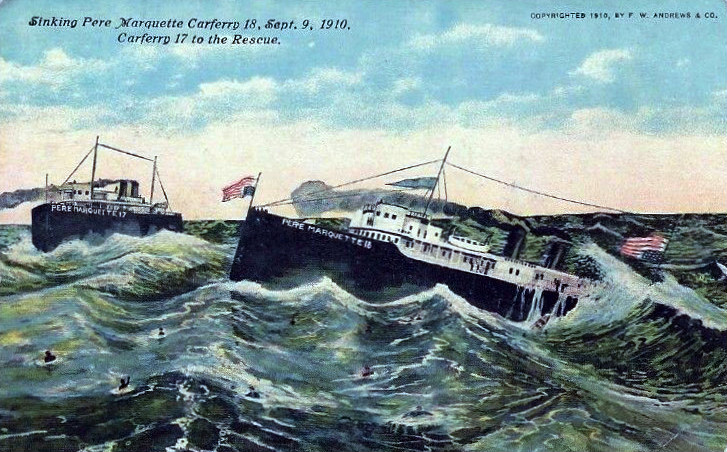
Postcard illustration of sinking ferry 18, with ferry 17 coming to its aid.

On September 10, 1910, the SS Pere Marquette No. 18 was bound for Milwaukee from Ludington, Michigan, with a load of 29 railroad freight cars and 62 people on board. Near midnight, the vessel began to take on massive amounts of water. The captain dumped nine railroad cars into Lake Michigan in a failed attempt to prevent the ship from sinking. The SS Pere Marquette 17, traveling nearby, picked up the distress call and sped to assist the distressed vessel. Shortly after SS Pere Marquette 17 arrived, the Pere Marquette 18 sank, resulting in the loss of 29 out of 62 total people on board. The location of the wreck was unknown until July 23, 2020, when shipwreck hunters Ken Merryman and Jerry Eliason confirmed the location using sonar and drop cameras at a depth of approximately 500 feet (152 meters).

== See also ==
- History of railroads in Michigan
- Pere Marquette 1225
