= Bangor station (Michigan) =

Train station in Bangor, Michigan

Bangor, MI
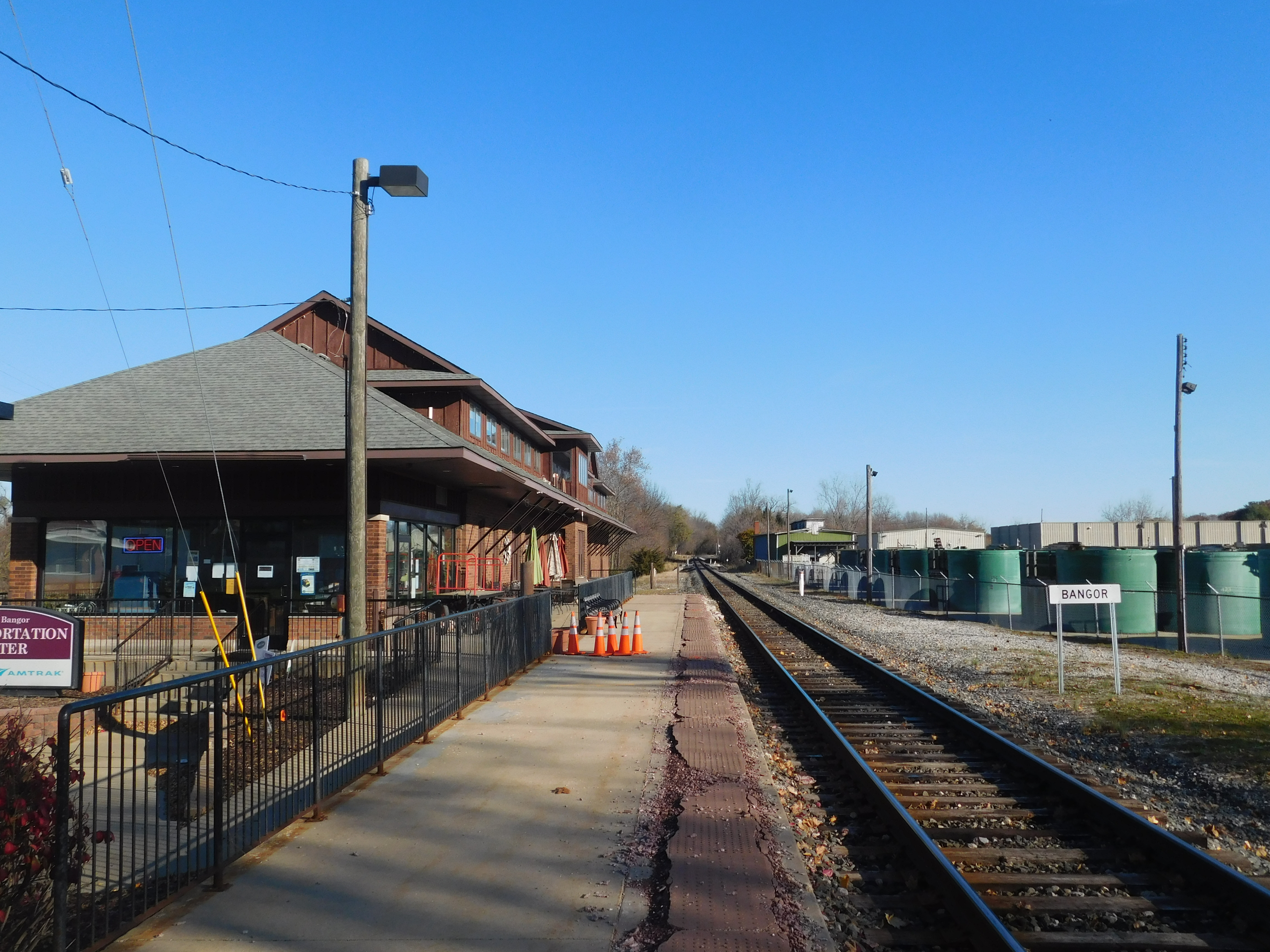
- The Amtrak station in Bangor in November 2016.

General information
- Location: 541 Railroad Street; Bangor, Michigan; United States
- Coordinates: 42°18′51″N 86°6′42″W
- Owner: City of Bangor
- Line: CSX Grand Rapids Subdivision
- Platforms: 1 side platform
- Tracks: 1

Construction
- Parking: Short-term only
- Accessible: Yes

Other information
- Station code: Amtrak: BAM

History
- Opened: 1926
- Rebuilt: 2005

Passengers
- FY 2025: 4,038 (Amtrak)

Services
Preceding station	Amtrak	Following station
St. Joseph toward Chicago	Pere Marquette	Holland toward Grand Rapids
Former services
Preceding station	Chesapeake and Ohio Railway	Following station
McDonald toward Chicago	Pere Marquette Railway; Main Line	Breedsville toward Grand Rapids
Location

Bangor station is a train station in Bangor, Michigan, serving Amtrak's Pere Marquette line. The station, originally built in 1926 by the Pere Marquette Railway, was renovated in 2005, and includes an enclosed waiting area, washrooms, a coffee shop, free parking, and payphones. It serves northern Van Buren County and the South Haven area.

== History ==
The brick Bangor station house was built in 1926 by the Pere Marquette Railway, replacing an 1870 wooden station that burned.

Amtrak shared the station with a toy train manufacturer from 1984 (when Amtrak service began) to 1991, when the manufacturer ceased production. The station was in declining condition, and Amtrak vacated it in favor of a smaller adjacent structure.

In November 2001, the City of Bangor purchased the station from CSX Transportation to prevent it from demolition. In 2004, they sold it to a health care provider, who doubled the floor space of the building by expanding the attic (once used as a sleeping space for railroaders) into a second floor. The city still owned the south portico, and they enclosed it as a waiting room.

In July, the Michigan Department of Transportation awarded a $125,000 grant to the city and Amtrak to rebuild the waiting room and railway platform (owned by Amtrak). After floor, windows, doors, and washrooms were replaced and the benches were refinished, the station was fully reopened to trains on May 6, 2005.

The portico is now the waiting room, the waiting room is now a coffee shop, and the freight agent office and freight room are now space for the health care provider.
