= Galder =

Galder may refer to:

== People ==
- Galder Cerrajería (born 1989), Spanish footballer
- Galder Gaztelu-Urrutia (born 1974), Spanish film and advertising director and producer
- Galder (artist), stage name of Norwegian musician Tom Rune Andersen (born 1976)

== Other uses ==
- Galder, Netherlands, a village in North Brabant
- Galder (incantation), old Germanic term for a type of incantation
- Galder Weatherwax, fictional chancellor of the Unseen University in Terry Pratchett's Discworld series of fantasy novels

== See also ==
- Van Galder, a surname
- Van Galder Bus Company, an American regional bus service
- Gelder (disambiguation)
- Van Gelder, a surname
