= Southwest Line =

Railway line in France

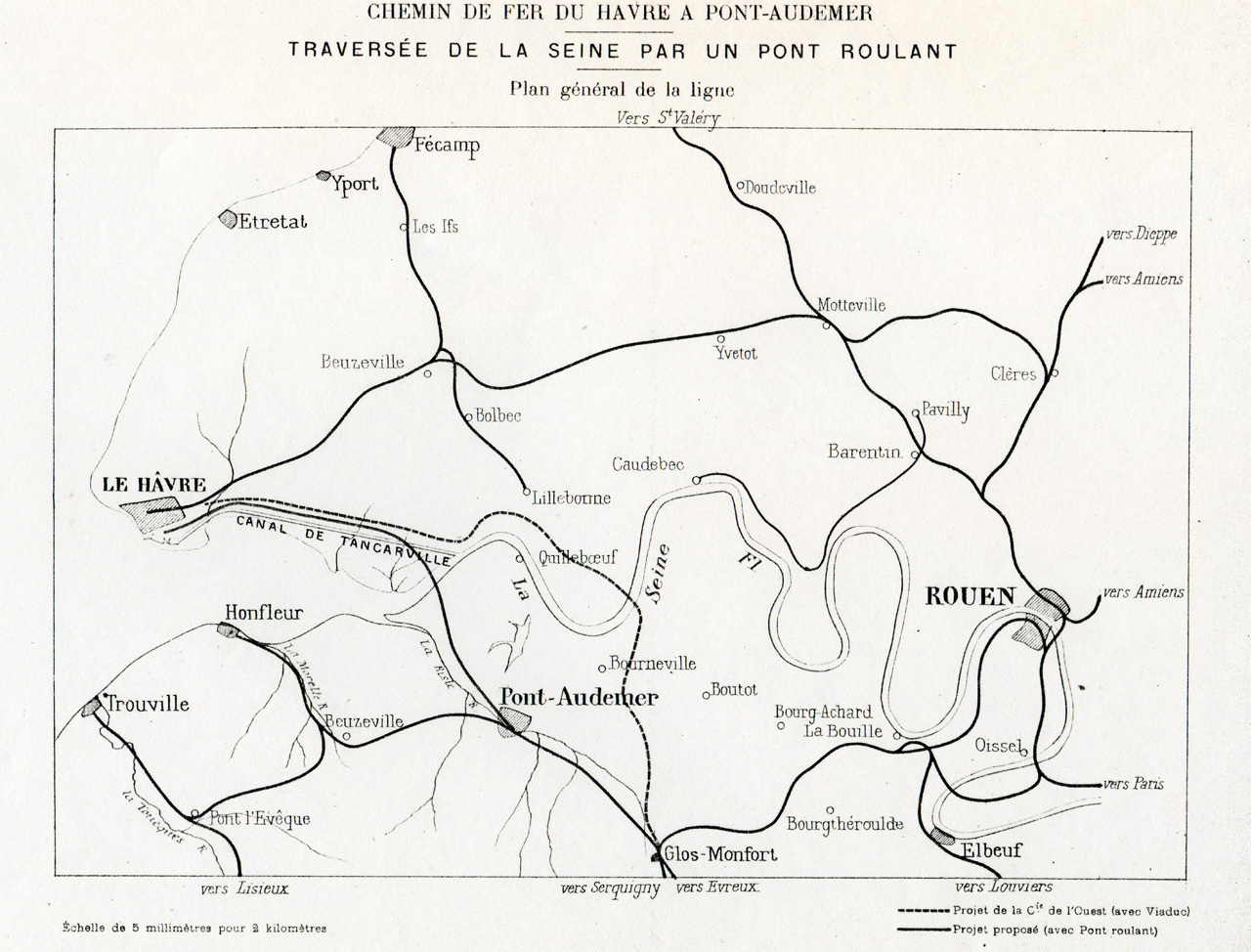
Map of two variants of the Southwest Line from the Compagnie des chemins de fer de l'Ouest, one with a ferry crossing of the Seine, the other by a viaduct.

At the end of the 19th and the beginning of the 20th century, the Southwest Line was designed to connect the port of Le Havre to the left bank of the Seine, and then to the west and southwest of France, by crossing the river near the estuary.

For some sixty years, this railway project mobilized the energies of the region, particularly Le Havre, but it was also a bone of contention between the main cities of Upper Normandy (Rouen and Le Havre). The systematic opposition of the inhabitants of Rouen to the construction of an engineering work downstream from their city (a potential obstacle to the navigation of ocean-going vessels up the Seine to their port), largely caused the failure of the line and threatened the very unity of the Seine-Inférieure department.

== A long preparation period ==
The idea of building what would later be known as the Southwest Line undoubtedly dates back to the inauguration of the Rouen - Le Havre railroad in 1847, the second stage of the radial line connecting Paris to the sea. The route linking the two major cities of Normandy (established on the Cauchois plateau some twenty kilometers north of the winding Seine) had required the construction of numerous engineering structures, five tunnels, and three viaducts, including the Barentin viaduct, which collapsed in January 1846 just a few months before being put into service. The inhabitants of Le Havre then realized that the only railroad line in their port city was insufficient and that it was full of architectural works that were rare in non-mountainous areas (in addition to the Barentin viaduct, there was the Mirville viaduct and the Pissy-Pôville tunnel), but vulnerable. An additional line was therefore needed to ensure the safety of communications at the Porte Océane.

However, it wasn't until the early 1870s, with the completion of dyking construction on the Seine estuary in connection with the construction of the Tancarville Canal, that the initial projects were launched. In 1870, a Parisian entrepreneur, Fresson, suggested building a railway of local interest between Le Havre and Rouen via the right bank (Caudebec, Duclair), but much closer to the river than the railroad on the Cauchois plateau.

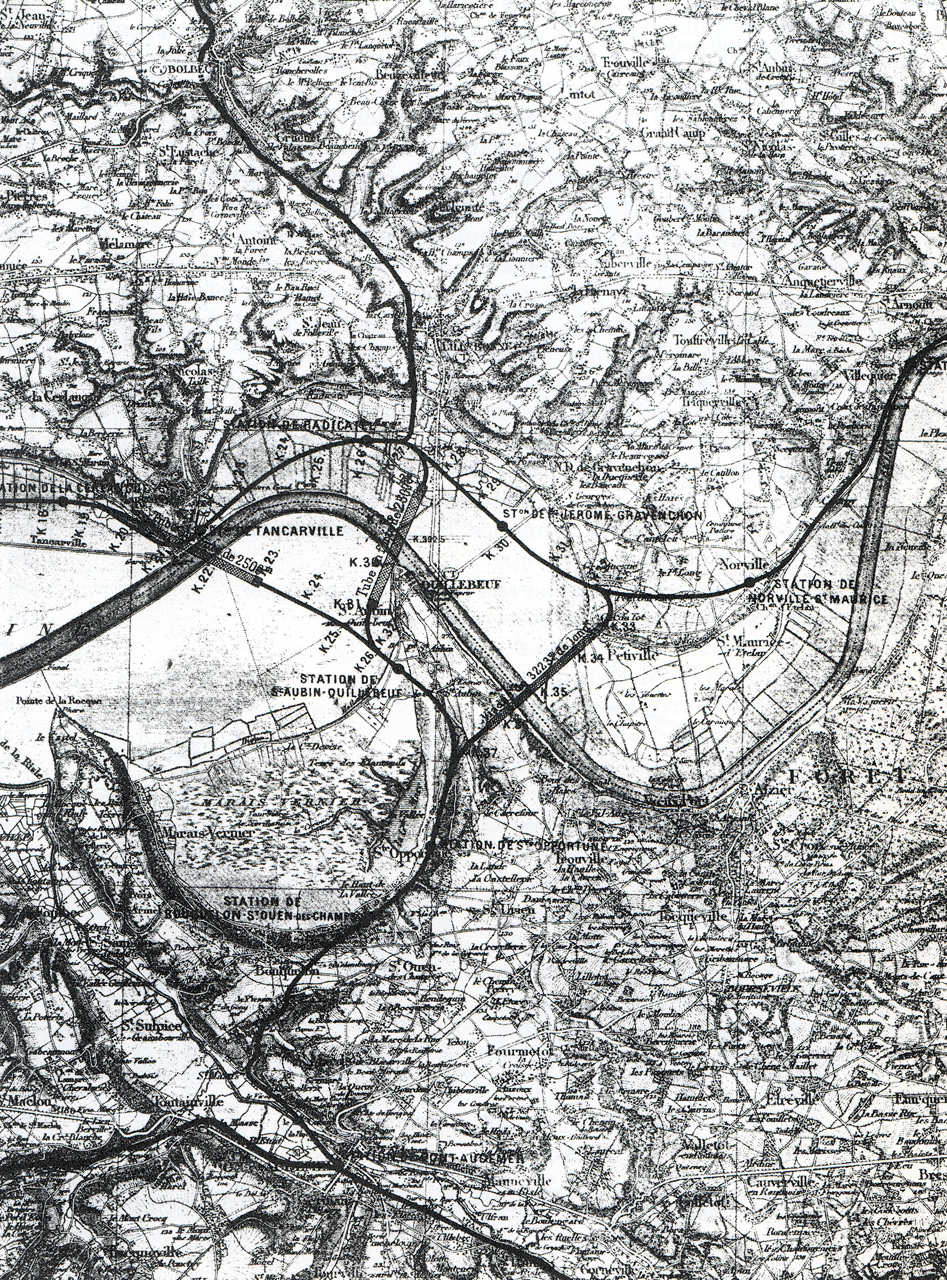
The Southwest Line gave rise to numerous projects; here, two line layouts with tunnel crossings of the Seine (downstream), and a third with viaduct crossings further upstream.

Although this project was soon abandoned, it was replaced in 1871 by a proposal from Delahante and Girard to build two lines, again for local interest. One would connect the two major cities of Normandy along a route almost identical to Fresson's. In contrast, the other would connect Le Havre and the département of Eure by crossing the Seine between Port-Jérôme and Quillebeuf on a ferry allowing convoys to pass from one bank to the other without breaking the load. A railroad built in the Eure between Pont-Audemer station and the banks of the Great River would have ensured the continuity of traffic to the center or Atlantic regions. This was the first mention of the Southwest Line. This project, too, was abandoned in 1873 due to the growing hostility of the Compagnie des Chemins de Fer de l'Ouest (Chemins de fer de l'Ouest), which, while recognizing the usefulness of these sections, could not bear to see its supremacy in the region threatened.

This twist of fate put the issue on hold for some time, but two events in 1879 revived the proposals. The first was the registration (under number 43) of the "Pont-Audemer to Port-Jérôme Line with steam ferry on the Seine" in the classification law of July 17, known as the Freycinet law, designed to complete the railroad network. It was also Gambetta's speech on October 26 to the leading figures in Le Havre that remained famous in the memory of the supporters of the Southwest railroad:

"I made comparisons between your docks, between your ports, between the way your products are sold. I thought about how humiliating it was for us (not for you, the people of Le Havre, but for us, the French) to think that a great center, a great focus for goods from all over the world, could be reduced to not being able to compete, to not being in direct communication with the north, nor with the center, nor with the west of France, for the sake of a few bands of steel that it lacked. Gentlemen, this is an intolerable situation. I speak here only as an ordinary citizen and I place at your disposal my contribution as an individual and free speaker.But if it depends on me to push this issue, surely you will no longer remain blocked from behind while the sea solicits you from the front".

During the next few years, new studies were carried out, with increasing emphasis on a permanent viaduct or tunnel link for crossing the Seine.

== Time for great projects ==
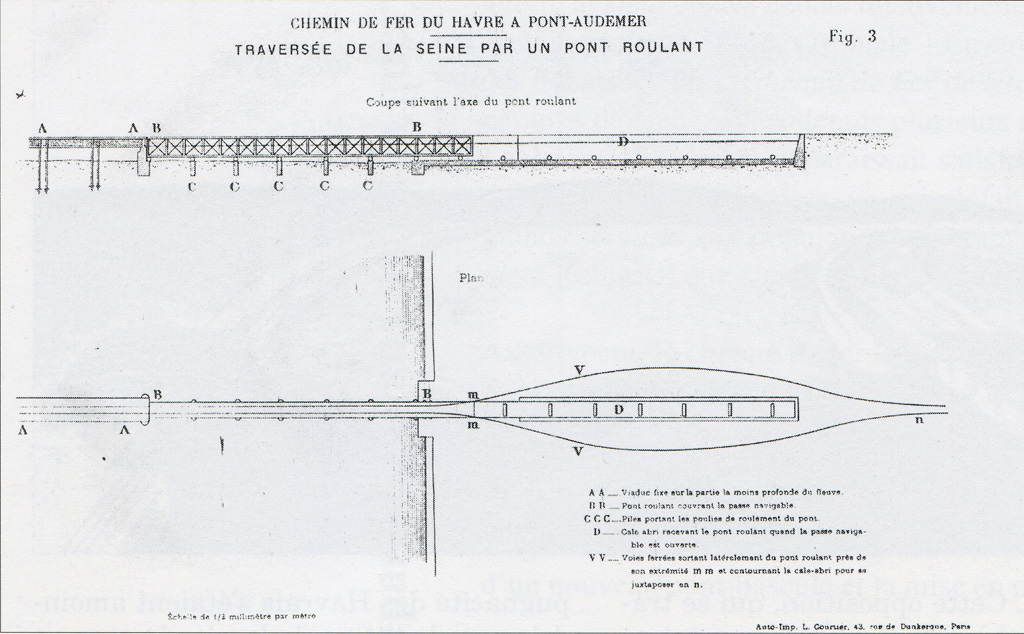
The submerged bridge crane project by Danisy-Martin (1895).

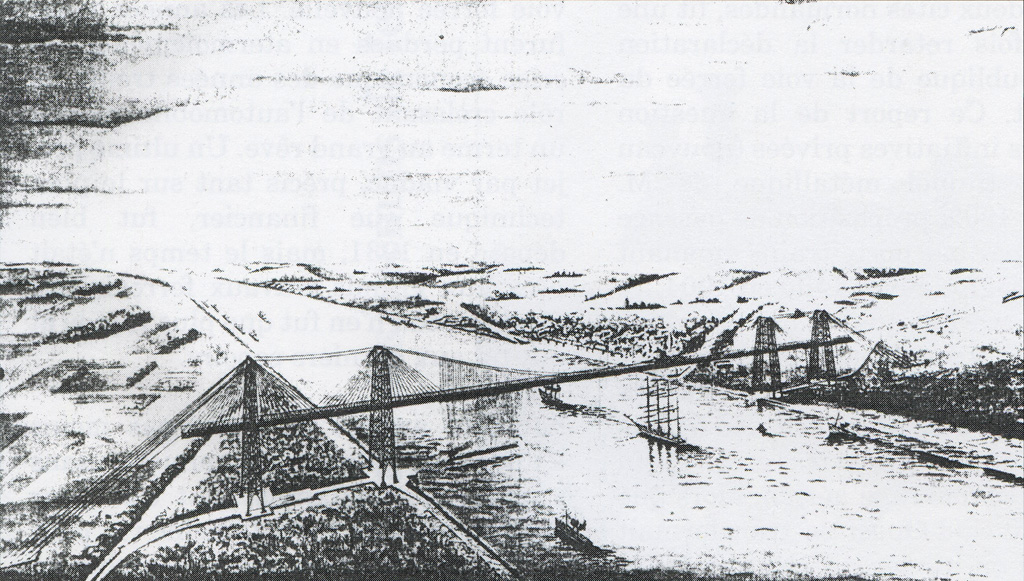
The transporter bridge project by Ferdinand Arnodin (1897).

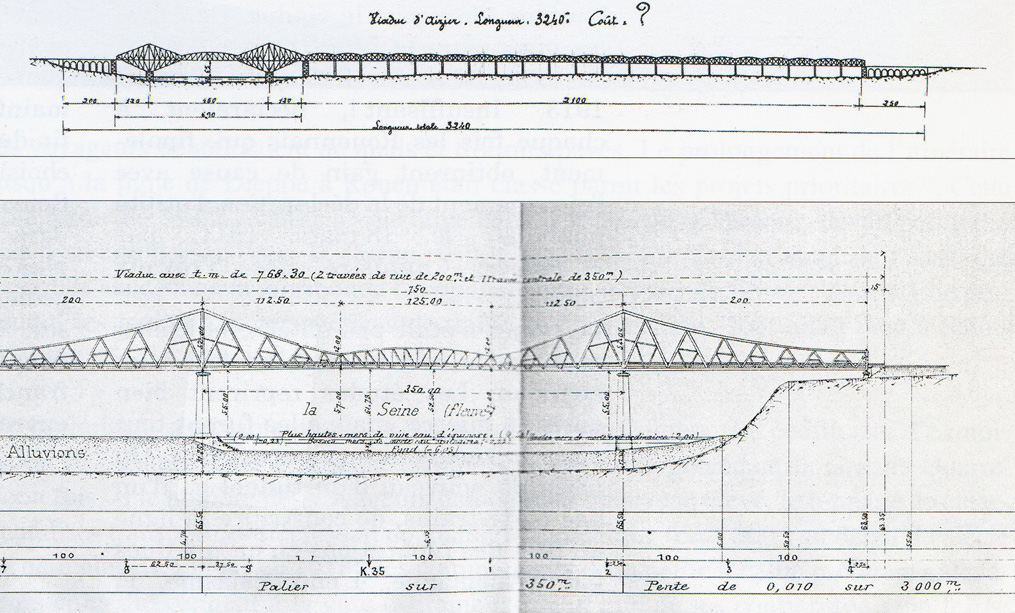
The cantilever viaduct project by Chemins de fer de l'Ouest (1900).

The year 1883 marked a turning point in the history of the Southwest link: the inclusion of a railroad line from Pont-Audemer to Le Havre via Lillebonne and the crossing of the Great Normandy river upstream of Port-Jérôme in Table A of the Freycinet project, approved by the law of November 19, 1883, paved the way for in-depth studies. An initial proposal, drawn up by Cordier in 1886, advocated an underground crossing of the Seine through a single-track masonry tunnel. However, the difficulty of cutting through the unstable alluvial soil led to the rejection of this solution in 1888.

This was only a temporary setback, however, as the last decade of the 19th century saw the emergence of several preliminary projects, spurred on by the mayor of Le Havre, Louis Brindeau:

- In 1891, the engineer Jean Berliet proposed crossing the Seine at an undetermined point near Port-Jérôme through a 4,500-metre tunnel divided into two sections: The first one, with a length of 2,000 meters and dug into stable ground, would have been bricked up, while the second one, established in alluvial deposits, would have consisted of a 2,500-meter metal tube. The latter, made for one line, would have had a diameter of 5.50 meters, leaving a circle of 5.20 meters available, and would have been formed by joining cast-iron rings 0.50 meters long, assembled from twelve identical plates.
- In 1892, it was Chemins de fer de l'Ouest's turn to propose a solution. The plan was that at Aizier (fifteen kilometers upstream of Port-Jérôme), a 2,800-meter viaduct was envisaged, including 2,300 meters for the access structure over the alluvial plain on the right bank. The central steel span, with an opening of 350 meters, would have had an air draught of 45 to 50 meters, in line with the requirements of the shipping industry that frequented the port of Rouen.
- The most original and spectacular of these was the preliminary project by Danisy-Martin, submitted in 1895. The Seine would have been crossed utilizing a submerged bridge, with a concrete foundation at the bottom, resting on screw piles firmly embedded in solid ground. Rails would have been laid on top of this structure to serve as a crane track for a ferry car whose upper deck was designed to accommodate trains.
- In 1897, Arnodin, one of the great engineers of his time, proposed the construction of a railway of local interest between Le Havre and Pont-Audemer, using a transporter bridge to cross the great Normandy River. This 560-meter structure, consisting of an upper deck set at a great height (60 meters) and placed between two pylons, leaving a 400-meter-long sea passage between them, would have offered a fine example of metal architecture near the estuary. A cart would have rolled on the deck, to which a gondola capable of carrying a small rail convoy would have been attached employing steel cables.

While all these projects were technically very interesting, the people of Le Havre were desperately awaiting the completion of the Southwest Line. But the authorities, and in particular the Ministry of Public Works, seemed to do everything in their power to delay the construction of this line, which would be so useful for the great port of the Manche. It was not until February 6, 1900, that Mr. Baudin, Minister of Public Works, authorized the construction of the railroad across the Seine, seventeen years after the adoption of Table A by his predecessor.

Two new projects saw the light of day and prompted a public inquiry:

- The first (submitted by Chemins de fer de l'Ouest) involved the construction of a 2,300-meter viaduct with a 57-meter draught at Aizier.
- The second (submitted the French government's engineers) suggested the construction of a 6,800-meter tunnel near Tancarville.

== The failure of line construction ==
As soon as the results of the studies were published, the people of Rouen, who had been silent until then, went on the rampage, led by Richard Waddington (General Councillor of Darnétal and President of the Chamber of Commerce and Industry). They criticized the viaduct for jeopardizing the access of ocean-going vessels to their ports and for threatening the safety of navigation on the river in the event of accidental destruction or conflict. They preferred a tunnel but demanded that it be buried deep enough to allow deep-draught ships to enter Rouen's docks in the future. This is what Waddington said at a meeting of the Chamber of Commerce and Industry of Rouen on July 7, 1900:

" As both solutions seem to be equally expensive, the Chamber unanimously believes that the only acceptable solution is the one that will guarantee the free flow of the river now and in the future, namely, the underground crossing chosen by the legislator in 1883".

This opposition, which resulted in furious verbal fights between representatives of the two Normandy cities in the General Council, once again delayed the announcement of the public use of the Southwest Railroad. This postponement prompted private initiatives (Jean Berliet's new metal tunnel project in 1902, the Fives-Lille company's proposal to cross the river by ferry in 1904, etc.), which were just as fruitless as the previous ones. Years passed, exasperating the people of Le Havre, but reassuring the people of Rouen.

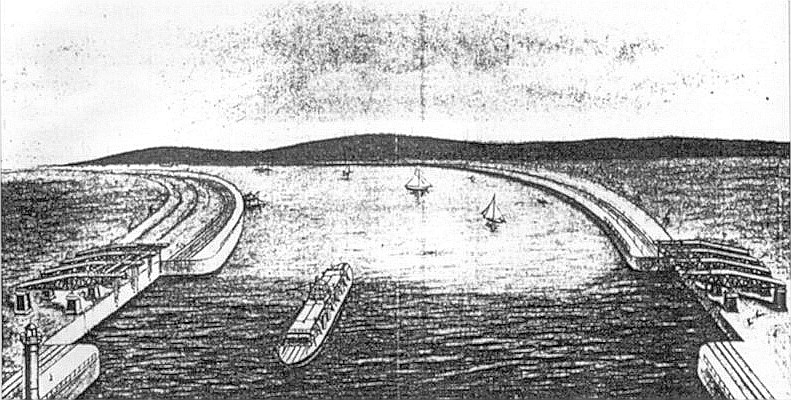
Fives-Lille ferry Project (1904).

From 1910 to 1914, the debates centered on how to cross the Seine with an overhead structure, while the Southwest Line gradually became a second railroad from Le Havre to Paris using the left bank. Discussions focused on the height of the viaduct. Engineers increased the clearance from 57 meters to 59 meters in 1911, 63 meters in 1912, and 65 meters in 1913. "Insufficient!" declared the people of Rouen, who finally won their case when the Minister of Public Works, Mr. Pichery, postponed the announcement of public use on March 18, 1914.

It was during this period preceding the First World War that the confrontation between the two great cities of Normandy came to an end. Each city, through the intermediary of one man (Richard Waddington for Rouen, Louis Brindeau for Le Havre) and one or more newspapers (Journal de Rouen and the Dépêche de Rouen on one side, and the Journal du Havre on the other) inveighed against the merits of the project. Articles in one city's daily newspaper always countered those of the rival city. Identical arguments were used repeatedly, each time countered by similar demonstrations. The people of Rouen accused the people of Le Havre of wanting to stifle their port by limiting the ability of a certain number of ships to navigate upstream by building a viaduct, and of threatening traffic if the viaduct collapsed. The latter accused the former of acting selfishly to limit competition with the Porte Océane by reducing its outlets. At the peak of the quarrel, Le Havre town councilors (speaking on condition of anonymity), after inveighing against Rouen's leaders and showering them with insults, proposed a new division of the Normandy departments, Seine-Inférieure and Eure, based on a north–south rather than an east–west boundary, thus avoiding the enemy sisters ending up in the same administrative district.

Although the project was not officially buried when the announcement of public use was postponed, it looked very much like an abandonment. Studies resumed well after the war but were just as fruitless as before. There was renewed talk of a tunnel or a rail ferry, and of building the line as part of the war reparations owed by Germany. The enthusiasm and pugnacity of the people of Le Havre had waned over time, and even the most ardent defenders of the new railroad were growing weary. The 1920s were lost in procrastination; the economic crisis of the 1930s and the growing role of the automobile put an end to Le Havre's hopes. A final viaduct project, both technically and financially precise, was submitted in 1931, but the time was no longer ripe for major railway projects, so it was quickly abandoned.

== Reasons for failure ==
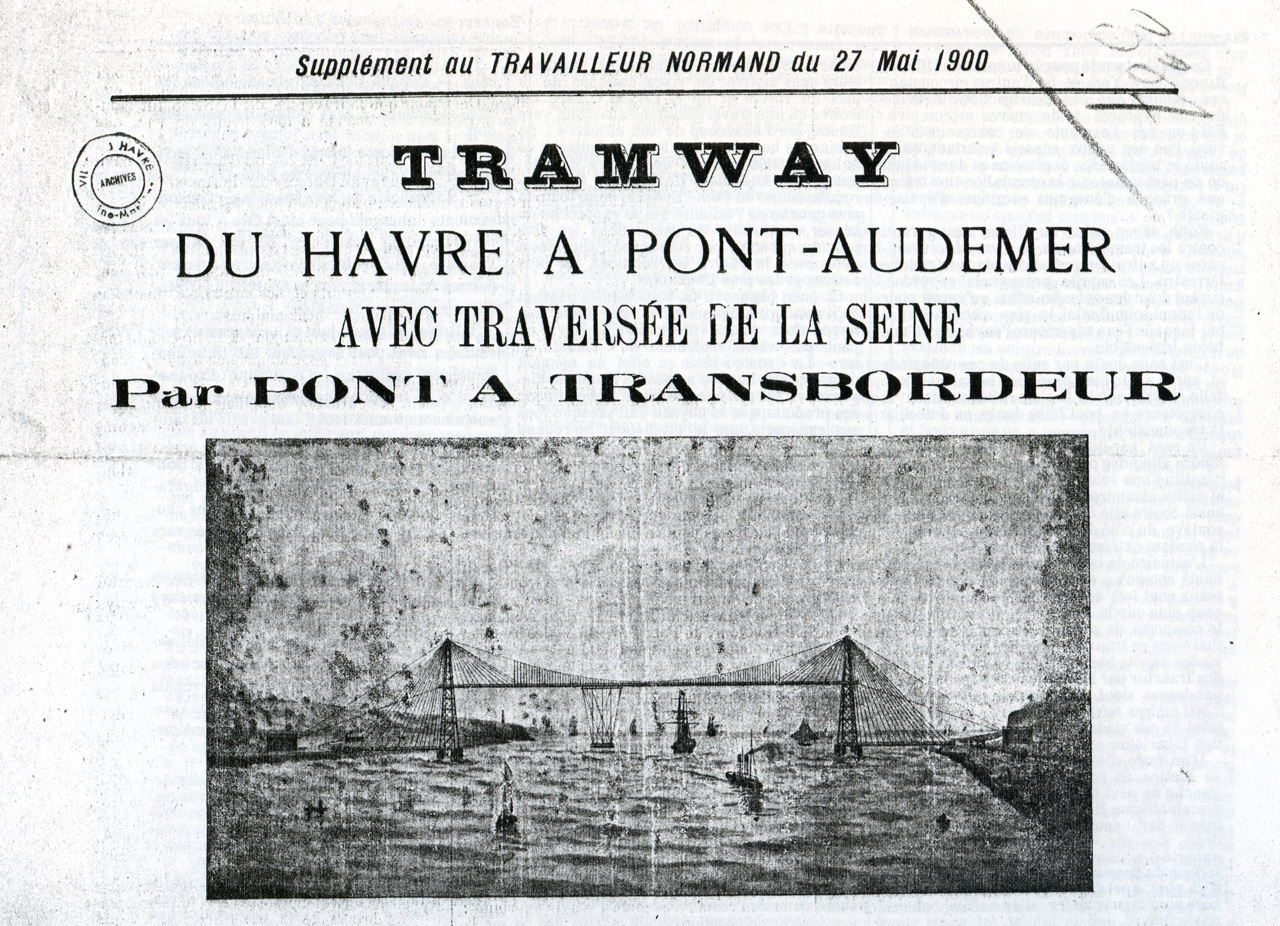
The Southwest Line often made the front page of local newspapers, as shown here in a newspaper supplement of Le Travailleur Normand, May 27, 1900.

Sixty years of heated debates and no fewer than forty projects (not counting variants) were all in vain because the line was never built. Why wait so long, and then never come to fruition? The difficulties encountered were numerous, and their accumulation explains the failure to build the route:

- Technical problems: In the case of crossing the Seine, meant not only the adoption of innovative solutions that were difficult to implement but also a very high cost (and likely to be revised upwards considerably) for the project. A risk of failure could not even be ruled out, and capital would already have been invested.
- Rivalry between Rouen and Le Havre: Based both on a more or less well-founded fear on the part of the authorities of the first-mentioned city that free movement on the river would be hindered, and on less noble motives of competition between the two port complexes (if not simply parochialism). A new line to the southwest would certainly have opened up new outlets for the Porte Océane, but would not have taken any of Rouen's traditional port traffic.
- Political difficulties at two different levels. At the local level, several local notables were accused of maneuvering for personal gain. Mr. Berge, General Councilor of Lillebonne and son-in-law of French President Félix Faure, was accused of delaying the project of crossing the Seine near Le Havre in favor of the variant via Saint-Maurice-d'Etelan, a commune in which he owned a large property (which would have greatly increased in value due to its proximity to the new route). At the national level, the criticism was directed at the support of important figures for the unscrupulous actions of the Compagnie des chemins de fer de l'Ouest. The company was using dubious practices to eliminate possible competition and limit its investments in new infrastructure (multiplying useless feasibility studies, changing the status of lines to be built from local interest to general interest...) to alleviate a difficult financial situation.

== The end ==
When the bridge over the Seine downstream from Rouen was built in 1959 for the first time, it was intended only for cars, and not for railroads. However, the railroad had shown the way, and the very fact that Tancarville, a site repeatedly recommended in the studies of the late 19th and early 20th centuries, was chosen as the site for a river crossing, confirmed the validity of the studies carried out as part of the Southwest Line project. Since then, the inauguration of the Pont de Normandie in January 1995 enabled a second crossing of the Seine even further downstream. In addition to its regional significance, the new structure would be one of the links in the transverse connection between Calais and Bayonne, known as the Autoroute des Estuaires, designed to serve the west of the country and relieve the Paris traffic hub, but once again the railroad was excluded from the project.

The idea of a tunnel under the Seine estuary surfaces regularly. With the development of Port 2000 in Le Havre, a new project for a rail (or road) crossing of the Seine estuary is being studied (at the instigation of the city's CCI), but would only be realized in the very long term.

== See also ==
- Ferdinand Arnodin
- Transporter bridge
- Cantilever bridge
- Voie ferrée d'intérêt local

== Bibliography ==
- Bertin, Hervé (1994). Petits trains et tramways Haut-Normands (in French). Cénomane. ISBN 2902808526.
- Brindeau, Louis (1905). La ligne du Sud-Ouest du Hâvre à la Basse-Normandie (in French).
- Manneville, Philippe (1980). Les chemins de fer d'intérêt local à la fin du xixe siècle et au début du xxe siècle : l'exemple d'un département, la Seine-Inférieure (in French). Extract from: 104e Congrès national des sociétés savantes, Bordeaux, vol. 1, 1979, p. 271-284. Bibliothèque Nationale. Paris.
