= New Buffalo station =

Amtrak rail station in New Buffalo, Michigan, USA

New Buffalo, MI
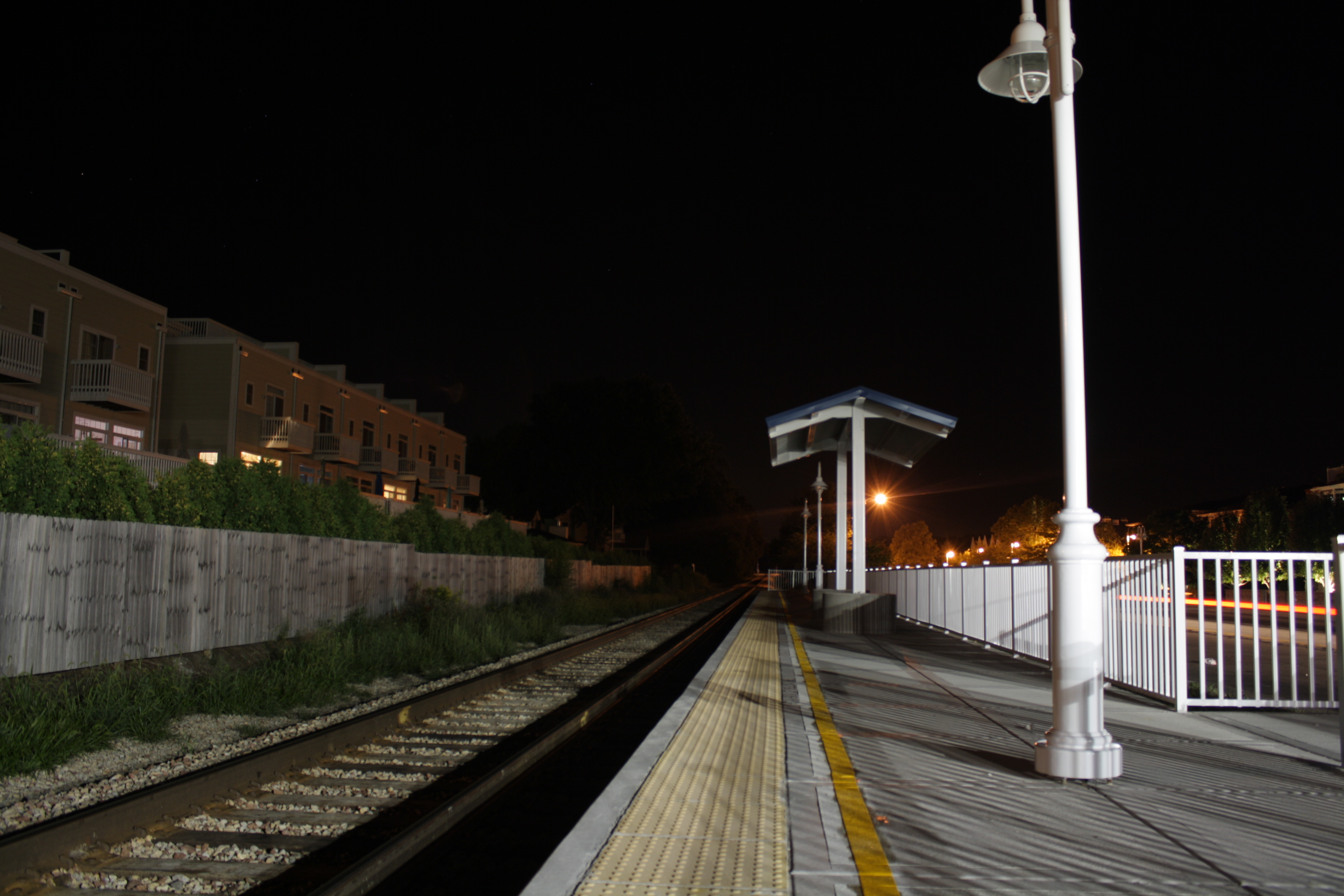
- The station in August 2009, prior to opening.

General information
- Location: 225 North Whittaker Street; New Buffalo, Michigan; United States
- Coordinates: 41°47′47″N 86°44′46″W
- Owner: Amtrak
- Line: Amtrak Michigan Line
- Platforms: 1 side platform
- Tracks: 1

Construction
- Parking: Yes; free
- Accessible: Yes

Other information
- Station code: Amtrak: NBU

History
- Opened: October 26, 2009

Passengers
- FY 2025: 32,572 (Amtrak)

Services
Preceding station	Amtrak	Following station
Chicago Terminus	Blue Water	Niles toward Port Huron
Hammond–Whiting toward Chicago	Wolverine	Niles toward Pontiac
Former services
Preceding station	Amtrak	Following station
Michigan City toward Chicago	Wolverine	Niles toward Pontiac
Hammond–Whiting toward Chicago	Pere Marquette	St. Joseph toward Grand Rapids
Preceding station	New York Central Railroad	Following station
Grand Beach toward Chicago	Michigan Central Railroad Main Line	Three Oaks toward Buffalo
Location

New Buffalo station is a train station in New Buffalo, Michigan, served by Amtrak, the United States' passenger railroad system. The Blue Water (Chicago–Port Huron) stops once daily, and Wolverine (Chicago–Detroit/Pontiac) stops three times daily in each direction.

== History ==
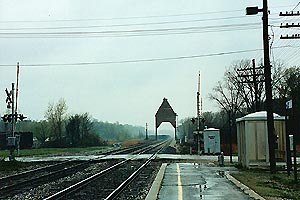
The old Pere Marquette station in 2002

From August 5, 1984 to October 26, 2009, Amtrak's Pere Marquette (Chicago—Grand Rapids) stopped in New Buffalo at a station along the CSX Grand Rapids Subdivision. This station was located approximately seven blocks south of the current station, close to the New Buffalo Railroad Museum. When the current station opened along the Amtrak-owned Michigan Line, the Pere Marquette stopped serving New Buffalo, although the trains still pass through town along this alignment. Future plans envision a new connection east of the city to allow the Pere Marquette to be rerouted via the Michigan Line, enabling the service to stop at New Buffalo again and create eastbound travel options.
