= St. Joseph station =

Amtrak station in Michigan, United States

St. Joseph, MI
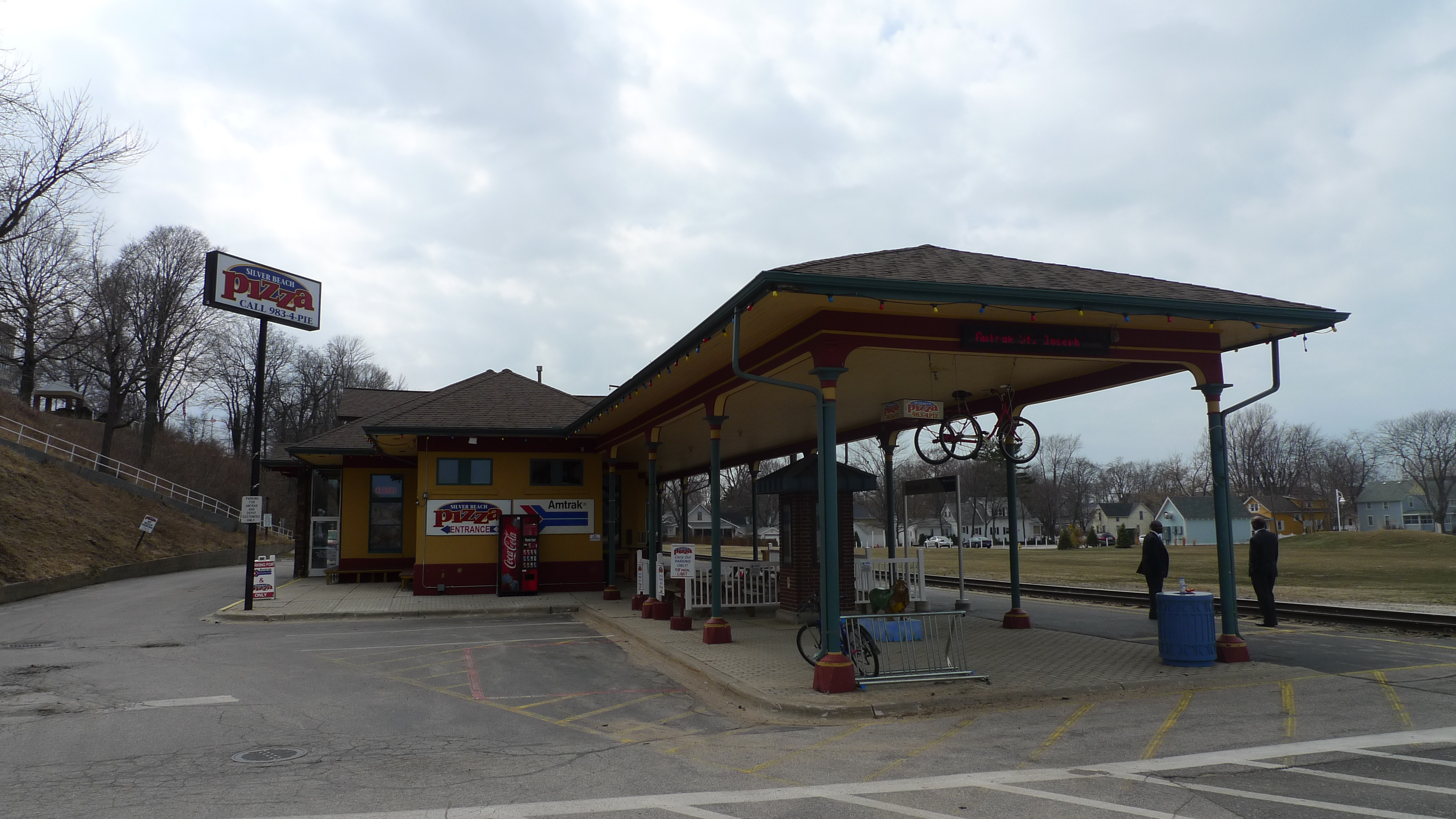
- St. Joseph station in March 2011

General information
- Other names: St. Joseph–Benton Harbor
- Location: 410 1/2 Vine Street; St. Joseph, Michigan; United States
- Coordinates: 42°6′24.4″N 86°29′12.1″W
- Line: CSX Grand Rapids Subdivision
- Platforms: 1 side platform
- Tracks: 1
- Connections: Twin Cities Area Transportation Authority

Construction
- Parking: Yes
- Accessible: Yes

Other information
- Station code: Amtrak: SJM

History
- Opened: 1913

Passengers
- FY 2025: 14,372 (Amtrak)

Services
Preceding station	Amtrak	Following station
Chicago Terminus	Pere Marquette	Bangor toward Grand Rapids
Former services
Preceding station	Chesapeake and Ohio Railway	Following station
Glenlord toward Chicago	Pere Marquette Railway; Main Line	Benton Harbor toward Grand Rapids
Location

St. Joseph station, also known as St. Joseph–Benton Harbor station, is an Amtrak train station in St. Joseph, Michigan, United States, served by Amtrak's Pere Marquette line. It is located at 410½ Vine Street in St. Joseph opposite Silver Beach County Park. Since 2005 the station has shared the building with Silver Beach Pizza. In 1986 the Chesapeake & Ohio Railroad sold this station to the city of St. Joseph, MI for $10,000. The station has a small waiting room with a self-service kiosk to purchase tickets.

== Transit connections ==
Twin Cities Area Transportation Authority (TCATA) Red Route travels within short walking distance of the station, running through St. Joseph and Benton Harbor.
