= Holland station (Michigan) =

Train station in Michigan, United States

Holland, MI
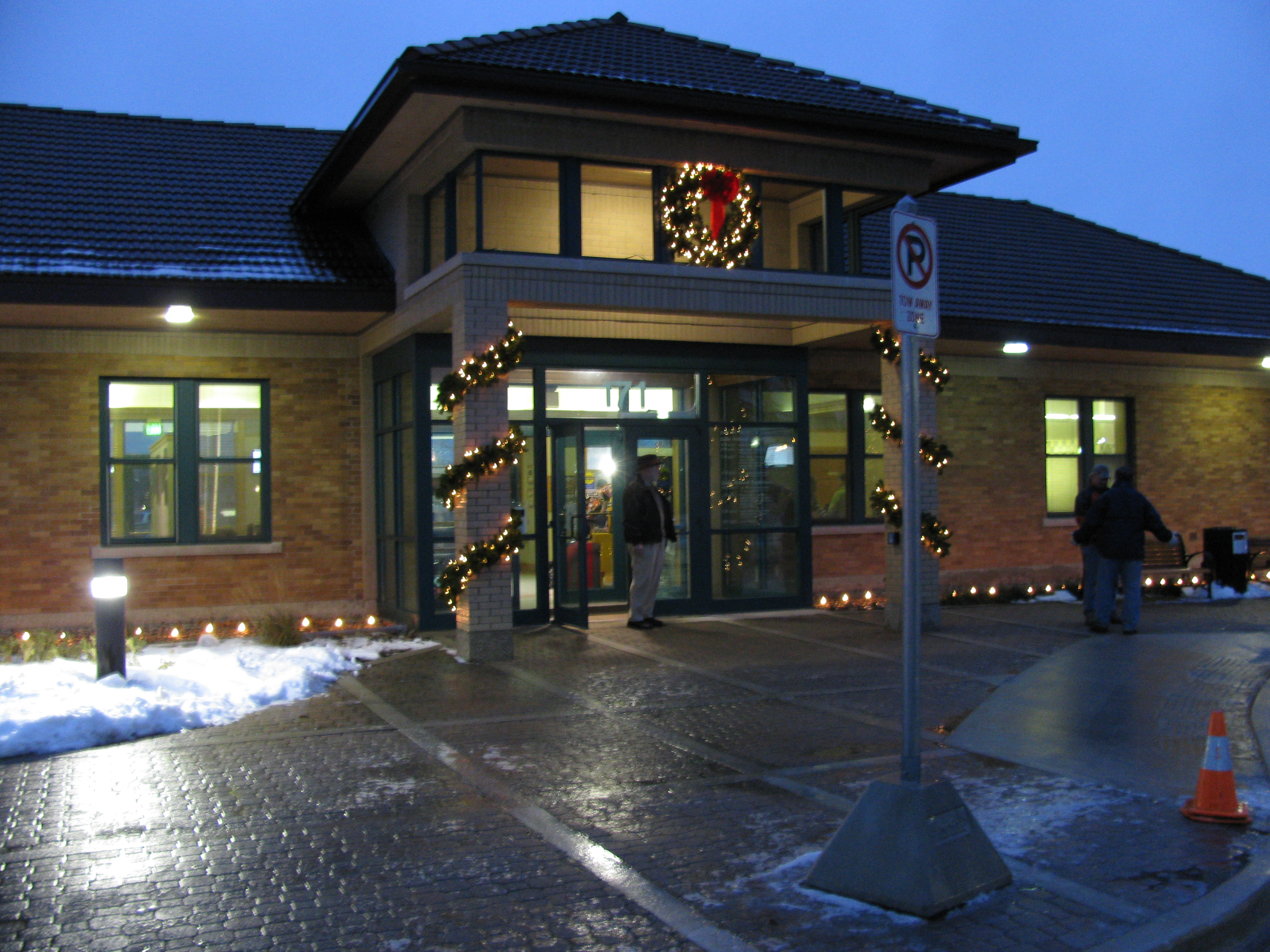
- Holland station in December 2009

General information
- Other names: Padnos Transportation Center
- Location: 171 Lincoln Avenue; Holland, Michigan; United States
- Coordinates: 42°47′21.7″N 86°5′52.9″W
- Line: CSX Grand Rapids Subdivision
- Platforms: 1 side platform
- Tracks: 1
- Connections: Macatawa Area Express (MAX)

Construction
- Parking: Yes
- Accessible: Yes

Other information
- Station code: Amtrak: HOM

History
- Opened: 1926
- Rebuilt: 1991

Passengers
- FY 2025: 32,775 (Amtrak)

Services
Preceding station	Amtrak	Following station
Bangor toward Chicago	Pere Marquette	Grand Rapids Terminus
Former services
Preceding station	Chesapeake and Ohio Railway	Following station
East Saugatuck toward Chicago	Pere Marquette Railway; Main Line	Zeeland toward Grand Rapids
Harlem toward Pentwater	PM Pentwater – Allegan	Filmore toward Allegan
Location

Holland station, also known as the Padnos Transportation Center, is an intermodal transit station in Holland, Michigan. It serves Amtrak's Pere Marquette line and is the central hub for Macatawa Area Express (MAX) buses. The facility includes a ticket machine and a waiting room.

== History ==
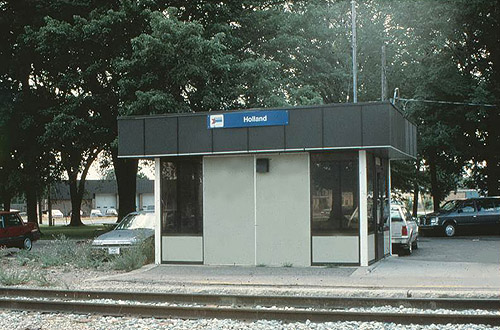
The station shelter in 1988

The depot building is a renovated 1926 structure, built by the Pere Marquette Railroad. The 1926 structure was advocated by local station agent Edward Belden Rich, who lobbied the line for a new structure since he arrived in Holland in 1909. Rich served the Pere Marquette Line in Holland until his retirement in 1936. Renovations were completed in 1991. Rich's great grandson Craig R. Rich, a city council member from 1982–2009, served on the renovation committee and emceed the dedication ceremony.

The Pere Marquette ran night and day trains through the station from Chicago to points north and east. Notable were the PM's Night Express from Chicago, which broke into two sections after Holland, one to Muskegon, another to Grand Rapids; and the seasonal Resort Special bound for Petoskey and Bay View. The Chesapeake and Ohio Railway continued service to Holland and Grand Rapids up to Amtrak's assuming passenger operations in 1971.

Passenger service resumed in 1984 with the introduction of the Pere Marquette. A small shelter on the platform initially served Amtrak passengers. The city purchased the building from CSX for $300,000 in 1989; it reopened in 1991.
