= Twin Cities Area Transportation Authority =

Transit system in southwestern Michigan, United States

- Founded: 1974
- Headquarters: 275 East Wall Street
- Locale: Benton Harbor, Michigan
- Service area: Berrien County, Michigan
- Service type: bus service, paratransit, dial-a-ride
- Routes: 2
- Fleet: 16
- Website: TCATA

Twin Cities Area Transportation Authority (TCATA) is an urban/rural transit provider that provides fixed-route and dial-a-ride bus transit service throughout the Benton Harbor, Michigan-Saint Joseph, Michigan area. It was established in 1974. It is funded through federal grants and state and local funds. and run by the elected Board of Trustees with consultation from the Local Advisory Council made up of residents within the service area.

== Fixed routes ==
The fixed route service was originally made of three routes - Red Route, Blue Route and Green Route. As of January 1, 2010, the Green Route was canceled due to low ridership. The Red Route serves Benton Harbor, St. Joseph, St. Joseph Charter Township and Royalton Township. The Blue Route serves Benton Harbor and Benton Township. Both routes operate between 6:00 am – 10:00 pm on weekdays and 8:00 am – 10:00 pm on Saturdays. The Blue Route runs every half an hour, while the Red Route runs every hour. The regular fares are $1.00, and $0.50 for seniors and people with disabilities.

== Transit connections ==
Red Route stops near the St. Joseph Amtrak station, which is served by Pere Marquette route. The route will drop off riders directly at the station on request and pick up riders if they call ahead of time.

== Relations with other transit systems ==
In 2016, Benton Harbor city commissioners voted against amalgamating TCATA with neighboring transit agencies such as Berrien Bus, Niles Dial-A-Ride, and Buchanan Dial-A-Ride.

== See also ==
- List of bus transit systems in the United States
- St. Joseph station
- Macatawa Area Express
