= Gelder, Iran =

Gelder or Goldar (Persian: گلدر) may refer to:

- Gelder, East Azerbaijan
- Gildir, East Azerbaijan
- Goldar, Qazvin
