= Gelder =

Gelder may refer to:

== People ==
- Alfred Gelder (1855–1941), British architect and Liberal politician
- Ian Gelder (born 1949), English actor
- Aert de Gelder (1645–1727), Dutch painter of biblical scenes and portraits
- Beatrice de Gelder (born 1944), Belgian cognitive neuroscientist and neuropsychologist
- Jacob de Gelder (1765–1848), Dutch mathematician; see List of almanacs § Almanac calculators
- Kim De Gelder (born 1988), Belgian mass murderer

== Places ==
- Guelders, a historical county in what is now the eastern Netherlands (including Gelderland)
- Gelder, Iran (disambiguation), several places

== See also ==
- Van Gelder
- Gelderland, a Dutch province
- Geldern, a city in the northwest of the federal state North Rhine-Westphalia, Germany
