= Bangor Elevator =

- U.S. National Register of Historic Places
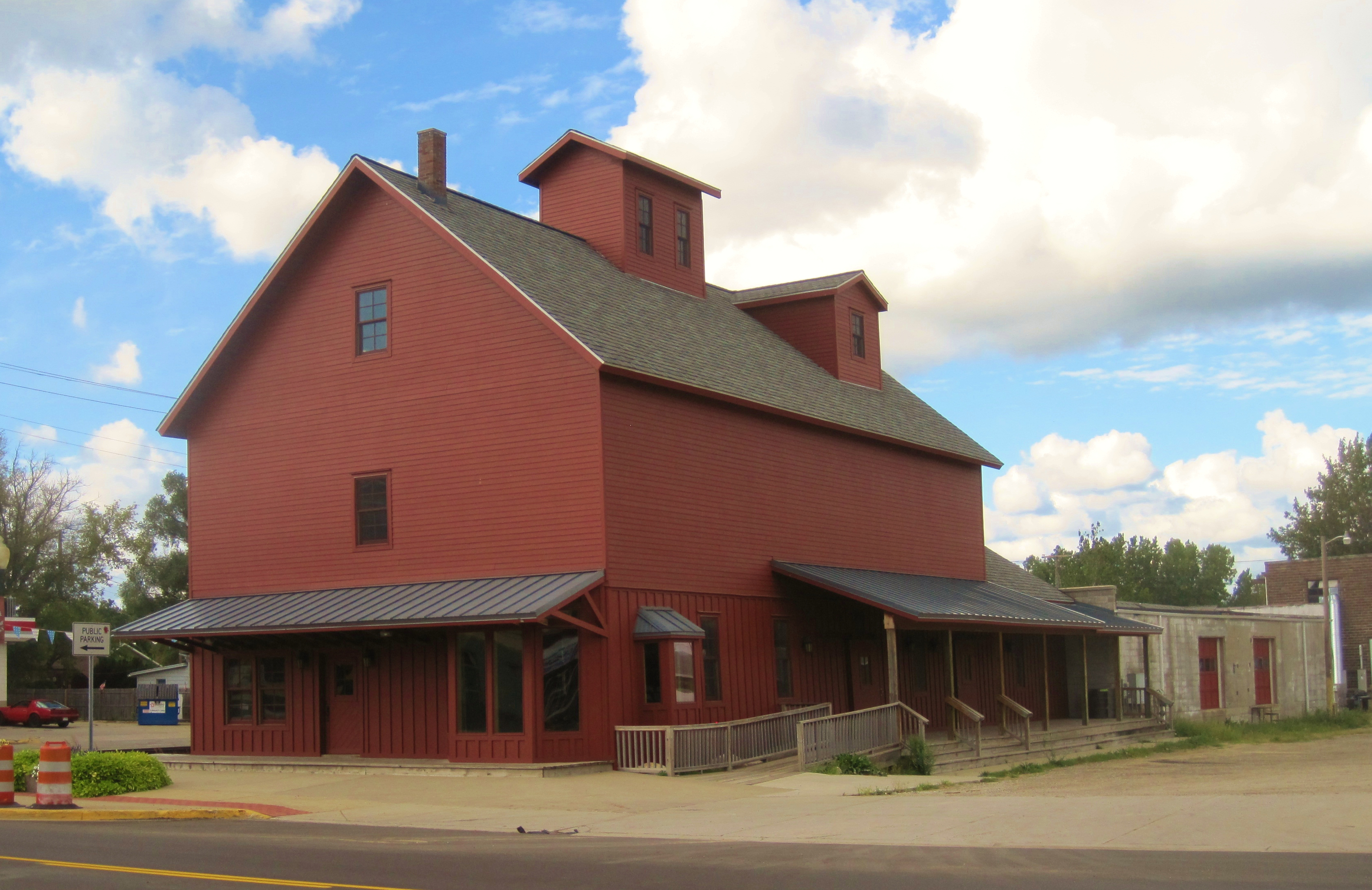

- Location within Michigan Location within the United States
- Interactive map
- Location: 142 W. Monroe St., Bangor, Michigan
- Coordinates: 42°18′48″N 86°6′43″W
- Area: less than one acre
- Built: 1873
- Architectural style: Timber-frame grain elevator
- NRHP reference No.: 09000523
- Added to NRHP: July 14, 2009

The Bangor Elevator is a grain elevator located at 142 West Monroe Street in Bangor, Michigan. It was listed on the National Register of Historic Places in 2009.

== History ==
The area around Bangor was first settled in the 1830s, but development was slow until Joseph H. Nyman constructed a sawmill in 1856. Nyman platted the village of Bangor in 1860, and in 1870 the Chicago and Michigan Lake Shore Railroad was constructed through the village. The railroad made Bangor a central location for shipment of timber and agricultural products from the adjoining country.

In 1873, Horace Sebring and Mitchell Hogmire constructed this grain elevator alongside the railroad tracks in Bangor. Sebring and Hogmire sold the elevator to Edwin R. Olds and Horace M. and Burrell A. Olney a few years later. William A. Charles and Fred N. Overton purchased the elevator in 1883 and Overton bought out Charles in 1889. Around 1900 the business passed to Frank Overton, who expanded it to include coal storage. Sam Martindale purchased it in 1907, then sold it to Tom and Lou Church two years later. The Church Brothers began to diversify, selling farm equipment and Ford automobiles.

In 1926, the building was moved to a new foundation 15 feet farther from the railroad tracks. The Bangor Fruit Growers Exchange, a local farmers' co-op, purchased the elevator in 1939. This group and a later owner operated the building as a grain elevator and farm supply store until about 1990. The building served only as a farm supply store before closing for good in 2001 or 2002, after which the city purchased it.

In 2003, the city sold it to Bangor Restoration, LLC, who promised to restore the structure. By 2006, the building had been substantially refurbished, and is now available for rental as a reception hall.

== Description ==
The Bangor Elevator is a two-story wooden gable-roof structure on a fieldstone foundation with a small gable-roof one-story rear extension, and, behind that, a 1944 one-story flat-roof concrete block addition. The structure is painted dark red. The exterior of rear extension and the first floor of the main section are clad with vertical board-and-batten siding, and the upper part of the elevator is covered with clapboarding with plain cornerboards. The two-story section measures 36 feet by 60 feet, and the rear extension measures 28 feet by 20 feet.

The two-story section is topped with a steeply pitched asphalt-shingled gable roof. A gable-roof cupola is positioned near the midpoint of the ridgeline, and a gable-roof dormer is positioned on each side of the roof. The cupola and dormers are clad with clapboards. On the front at street level, a shed roof canopy shelters the central entrance, which is flanked by windows. Above is a window on the second floor and another in the gable end.. Each side of the building has a sliding door and a double-hung window, and there is a final window in the rear gable end.

On the interior, the interior is finished with vertical boarding, and new wood flooring is in place. An electric-powered elevator is located on one wall. Two staircases constructed from lumber reused from the upstairs grain bins rise to the second floor. The second floor originally was almost entirely filled with rectangular wood grain bins, but some have been removed.
