= 1900 in rail transport =

This article lists events related to rail transport that occurred in 1900.

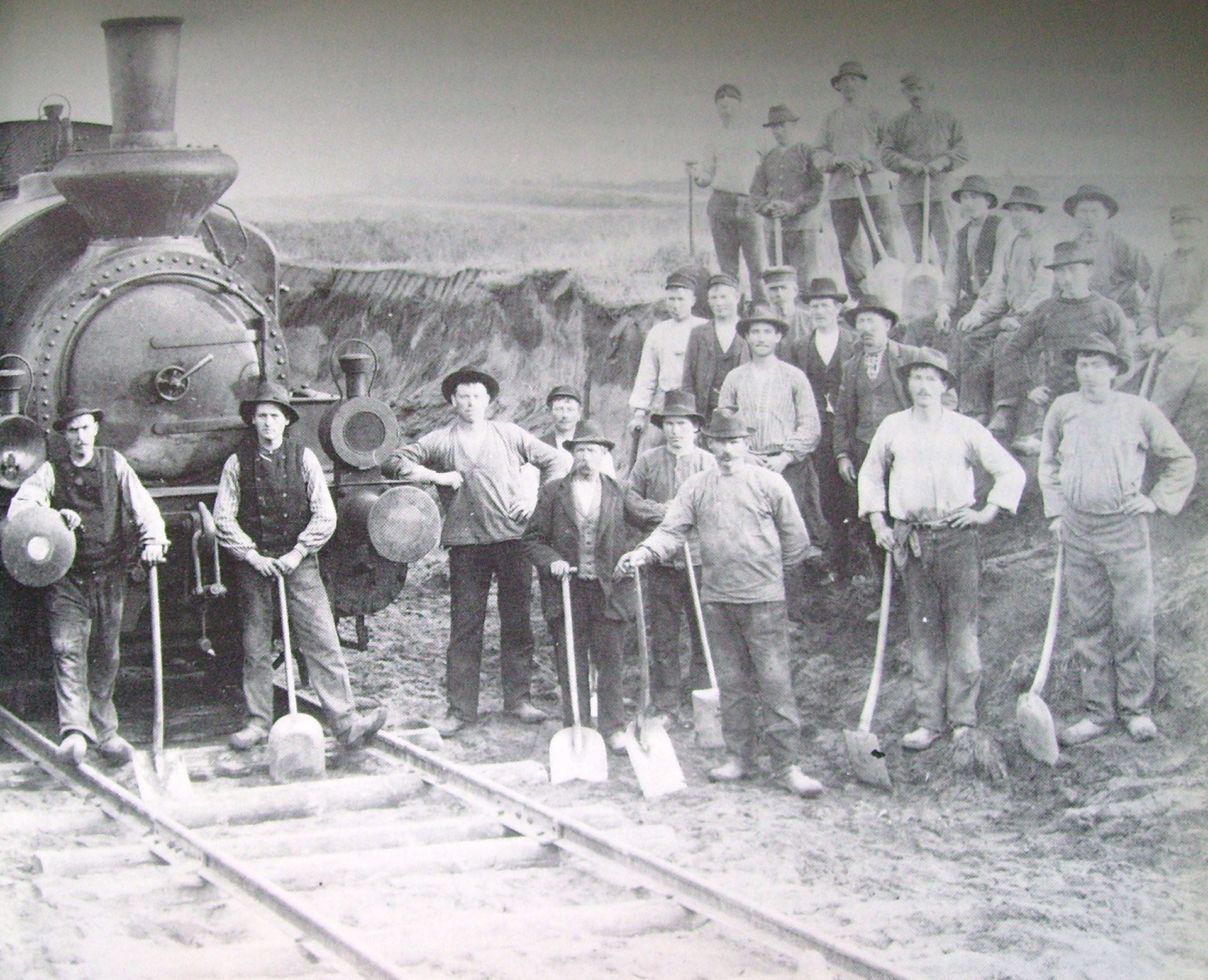
Railway workers in Sweden, 1900

== Events ==
=== January events ===
- January 1 –
  - Pere Marquette Railroad is incorporated and created from the merger of the Flint and Pere Marquette Railway, Detroit, Lansing and Northern Railroad and Chicago and West Michigan Railway.
  - The first interurban car from Greenwood, Indiana to enter the city of Indianapolis arrived at the terminal of the company's line at Washington and Illinois Streets.
- January 9 – The first through passenger train goes from Cairo to Khartoum.

=== February events ===
- February 12 – The Escanaba and Lake Superior Railway is reorganized through bankruptcy proceedings as the Escanaba and Lake Superior Railroad.
- February 27 – The Nehru Setu railway bridge opens, becoming the longest bridge in India.

=== March events ===
- March 17 – Great Eastern Railway of England introduces the first Class S46 Claud Hamilton 4-4-0 steam locomotive from its Stratford Works.
- March 24 – Mayor of New York Robert A. Van Wyck turns the first shovel of dirt in groundbreaking ceremonies for the first subway line in the city.
- March 30 – The Cape Breton Electric Tramway and Power Company in Nova Scotia, Canada, is incorporated.
- March 30 – The Newark, Somerset and Straitsville Railroad is reorganized as the Ohio Midland Railroad.

=== April events ===
- April 1 – Newtown Tram Depot is opened in Sydney.
- April 2 – Kreis Westhavelland opens as a 750 mm (2 ft 5 1/2 in) gauge railway connecting Rathenow, Senzke and Paulinenaue, in the German state of Brandenburg.
- April 26 – A defective chimney on a house in Hull, Ontario starts the Great Hull–Ottawa fire; among the items destroyed are nearly 200 freight cars and the Canadian Pacific Railway station and freight house. The resulting shortage of lumber for reconstruction forces Canada Atlantic Railway to temporarily halt production on new railroad cars at the company shops in Ottawa.
- April 30 – Illinois Central engineer Casey Jones crashes his train just north of Vaughan, Mississippi, and earns a spot in American folklore.

=== May events ===
- May – The Santa Fe and San Joaquin Valley Railway begins operations between Bakersfield and San Francisco.
- May 24 – Nottingham Victoria railway station opens in Nottingham, England.
- May 28 – The Compagnie du chemin de fer de Paris à Orléans opens its Gare d'Orsay station in Paris, the world's first electrified urban terminal station.
- May 31 – The Northwestern Elevated Railway, built by infamous traction magnate Charles Tyson Yerkes, begins operations between the Loop in downtown Chicago and Wilson and Broadway Avenues in Uptown on the North Side.

=== June events ===
- June 22 – A train at the Grand Falls in New Brunswick, Canada, falls through the bridge into the Saint John River.
- June 27 – Official opening of the Central London Railway, core of the Central line of the London Underground, the third deep-level electrified "tube" railway in the city.

=== July events ===
- July 1
  - Completion of a dual-gauge connection unifies Normandy's narrow-gauge Chemins de fer du Calvados.
  - Great Indian Peninsula Railway property purchased by Government of India.
  - The Boston and Albany Railroad becomes a subsidiary of the New York Central.
- July 19 – The first section of the Paris Métro opens.
- July 29 – Construction is completed on the narrow-gauge White Pass and Yukon Route between Whitehorse, Yukon, Canada, and Skagway, Alaska, United States.
- July 30 – The Central London Railway opens to the public between Shepherd's Bush and Bank.

=== August events ===
- August 6 – An Act is passed to authorize the absorption of the Aberlady, Gullane and North Berwick Railway in Scotland by the North British Railway via a stock transfer.
- August 14 – Charles Melville Hays succeeds Collis P. Huntington as president of the Southern Pacific Railroad after Huntington's death.
- August 15 – Regular service begins between Skagway, Alaska, and Whitehorse, Yukon, on the White Pass and Yukon Route.

=== September events ===
- September 22 – Harry C. Grant and Joshua Lionel Cowen file incorporation papers in New York creating toy train manufacturer Lionel.

=== December events ===
- December 18 – The Upper Ferntree Gully – Gembrook narrow-gauge railway in Victoria, Australia, opens for traffic. It is now preserved, operating as the Puffing Billy Railway.
- December 20 – Great Northern Railway (U.S.) opens first Cascade Tunnel (2.6 mi (4.2 km)).
- December 31 – Southern Pacific completes construction of the Coast Line from Los Angeles to the San Francisco Bay Area, eliminating the need to operate through the San Joaquin Valley. The line is presently (2007) owned by Union Pacific, and is the operation line of Amtrak's (formerly Southern Pacific's) Coast Starlight.

=== Unknown date events ===
- The Pittsburgh, Shenango and Lake Erie Railroad is renamed Bessemer and Lake Erie Railroad.
- Atchison, Topeka and Santa Fe Railway gains control of Colorado Midland and begins operating it as a subsidiary railroad.

== Births ==
=== January births ===
- January 3 – C. L. Dellums, cofounder of the Brotherhood of Sleeping Car Porters (died 1989)
- January 15 – Rogers E. M. Whitaker ("E. M. Frimbo"), writer on rail travel (died 1981)

== Deaths ==
=== March deaths ===
- March 29 – Cyrus K. Holliday, co-founder of Topeka, Kansas, and first president of the Atchison, Topeka and Santa Fe Railroad (b. 1826).

=== April deaths ===
- April 20 – Andrew Barclay, Scottish steam locomotive builder (born 1814).

=== August deaths ===
- August 13 – Collis P. Huntington, a member of the Big Four group of financiers in California (born 1821)

=== November deaths ===
- November 12 – Henry Villard, president of Northern Pacific Railway 1881–1884, dies (born 1835).

=== Unknown date deaths ===
- Robert S. Hughes, president of Rogers Locomotive Company 1893–1900.
