= Van Gelderen =

Van Gelderen is a Dutch toponymic surname meaning from/of the city of Geldern or from/of the county/duchy of Guelders. It may refer to:

- Charlie van Gelderen (1913–2001), South African labor activist
- Gerrit van Gelderen (1926–1994), Dutch naturalist, film-maker, illustrator and cartoonist in Ireland
- Henk van Gelderen (1921–2020), Dutch resistance member
- Jacob van Gelderen (1891–1940), Dutch economist
- Jordi van Gelderen (born 1990), Dutch footballer
- Liam van Gelderen (born 2001), Dutch footballer

== See also ==
- Van Gelder, surname of the same origin
