= 1991 in rail transport =

This article lists events related to rail transport that occurred in 1991.

== Events ==
=== April ===
- April 7 – The Empire Connection opens in New York City, allowing Amtrak trains from Upstate New York to reach Pennsylvania Station. Scheduled Amtrak service to Grand Central Terminal ends.
- April 25 – Monterrey Metro Line 1, A first section of San Bernabé to Exposición route officially regular operation service to start in Nuevo León, Mexico.

=== June ===
- June 1 – The last remaining Trans Europ Express trains operate for the last time on this date. However, TEE service was revived on one route in 1993 (and then lasted until 1995).
- June 25 – Croatian Railways (Hrvatske željeznice) formed.
- June – The Tōhoku Shinkansen in Japan is extended from Ueno Station to Tokyo Station.

=== July ===
- July 16 – Indian Railways inaugurates the Lifeline Express (Jeevan Rekha) hospital train.
- July 29 – The European Council adopts directive 91/440/CEE relating to the development of European railroads.

=== September ===
- September 18 – The last train out of Mahone Bay, Nova Scotia, departs with six Canadian National Railway diesel locomotives pulling 64 railroad cars and caboose number 79822.
- September – A 400 Series Shinkansen train sets a speed record of 345 km/h (214.4 mph) on the Jōetsu Shinkansen line between Tokyo and Niigata, Japan.

=== October ===
- October 15–20 – Following passage of the Intermodal Surface Transportation Efficiency Act of 1991, five high-speed rail corridors are designated for the first time in the United States: The Midwest, Florida, California, the Southeast, and the Pacific Northwest. However, funding for these projects would remain elusive until $8 billion was released in 2010 under the American Recovery and Reinvestment Act of 2009.

=== November ===
- November 29 – In Tokyo, Japan, the Namboku Line is opened between Akabane-iwabuchi and Komagome.

=== December ===
- December 10 – The Toei Oedo Line is opened from Nerima to Hikarigaoka in Tokyo, Japan.
- December 12 – Amtrak and the California Department of Transportation (Caltrans) begin the Capitols passenger rail route (later renamed Capitol Corridor), connecting the Sacramento region of the Central Valley with Oakland and San Jose in the San Francisco Bay Area.
- December 26 (and further) – After dissolution of the USSR several national railways were formed.
- December 30 – The Cabinet of Ministers of Ukraine issues a decree on to build the new underground metro system in Donetsk.

=== Unknown date ===
- TrailerTrain changes its name to the TTX Company.
- The Richmond, Fredericksburg and Potomac Railroad is merged into CSX Transportation.
- Ferrocarriles Argentinos, the state railway system of Argentina, is split with the metropolitan lines around Buenos Aires becoming Ferrocarriles Metropolitanos and most of the remaining lines becoming Belgrano Cargas.
- Railroad Development Corporation first invests in the Iowa Interstate Railroad.
- Baikal–Amur Mainline declared complete.

== Accidents ==
- January 8 – Cannon Street station rail crash at Cannon Street station in London kills two.
- May 14 – The Shigaraki train disaster occurred in Shigaraki (now Kōka), Shiga Prefecture, Japan. A Shigaraki Kohgen Railway (SKR) train and a West Japan Railway Company (JR West) train collided head-on, killing 42 people and injuring 614 others.
- May 25 – A Class 43 high-speed train from Newquay to London Paddington on the Atlantic Coast Line derails in the Luxulyan Valley.
- July 21 – Newton (South Lanarkshire) rail accident killed 4 people at Newton station south east of Glasgow, Scotland.
