= Thelma Terry =

American jazz bassist and bandleader (1901–1966)

Background information
- Born: Thelma Esther Combes; September 30, 1901; Bangor, Michigan, U.S.
- Died: May 30, 1966 (aged 64) Watervliet, Michigan, U.S.
- Genres: Jazz
- Occupations: Musician, bandleader
- Instrument: Double bass
- Years active: 1926–1931

Thelma Terry (born Thelma Esther Combes; September 30, 1901 – May 30, 1966) was an American bandleader and bassist during the 1920s and 1930s. She led Terry and Her Playboys and was the first American woman to lead a notable jazz orchestra as an instrumentalist.

== Early life ==
Terry was born in Bangor, Michigan in 1901. Her parents divorced when she was very young. She moved with her mother and two sisters to Chicago, where her mother was employed as a servant for the wealthy Runner family. When young Thelma was given the opportunity to receive musical training with the instrument of her choice, she chose to study string bass. Her early years were spent on the road performing in Chautauqua assemblies. After graduating from Austin Union High School, she earned first chair in the Chicago Women's Symphony Orchestra. As this did not provide her with a living, she turned to jazz.

== Early career ==
Through contacts at Austin Union, she found her way into Chicago nightlife. After playing in and around Chicago for some years, sometimes with her all-women band, Thelma Combes and her Volcanic Orchestra, sometimes in a jazz string quartet, she was hired for the house band in Colosimo's Restaurant, owned by Al Capone, in 1925. She played bass and sang at Colosimo's, sometimes on live radio.

== Bandleader ==
A job at a Chicago theater in 1927 and an article in Variety brought national attention to Combes. The Music Corporation of America took notice. They renamed her "Thelma Terry" and gave her an all-male band, Thelma Terry and Her Playboys, with a young Gene Krupa on drums.

Some sources state that the band's home was The Golden Pumpkin nightclub at 3800 West Madison in Chicago, and that the Playboys may have been the house band. MCA billed Terry as "The Beautiful Blonde Siren of Syncopation", "The Jazz Princess", and "The Female Paul Whiteman". Bud Freeman was so enthusiastic about the band that he paid another musician to fill his seat in the Spike Hamilton Band so he could join the Playboys. The band was sent by MCA on a national tour that took them down the Eastern Seaboard and as far west as Kansas City.

In 1929, MCA decided that Terry and her band would begin an international tour beginning in Berlin, Germany. But by that time she had met Willie Haar, the owner of a Savannah, Georgia resort at which the band played during their 1929 tour. Terry disbanded the Playboys and quit MCA to marry Haar and settle in Savannah.

== Later life ==
Terry married Willie Haar in 1929 and had a daughter, Patti, in 1931. She divorced Haar in 1936 and tried to make a comeback in Chicago. She sold her string bass, turned her back on the music profession, and took a job as a knitting instructor.

In the 1950s, she moved back to her native Michigan, where she met with Gene Krupa, the drummer for the Playboys. Krupa told her he was sorry she was not mentioned in his 1959 biographical movie The Gene Krupa Story.

== Death ==
She spent her last years with Patti and her family in her native Michigan. She died of esophageal cancer at the age of 64 on May 30, 1966.

== Discography ==
Terry recorded six songs: four in Chicago (plus an additional take of "Lady of Havana") with Gene Krupa on drums, and two in New York City, all in 1928. (Rust, 2002, lists the second take of "Lady of Havana".)

Chicago:

- "Mama's Gone, Goodbye"
- "Lady of Havana" (2 takes)
- "The Voice of Southland"
- "Starlight and Tulips"

New York:

- "When Sweet Susie Goes Steppin' By"
- "Dusky Stevedore"
