= Pere Marquette (Amtrak train) =

Amtrak train route between Chicago, Illinois and Grand Rapids, Michigan

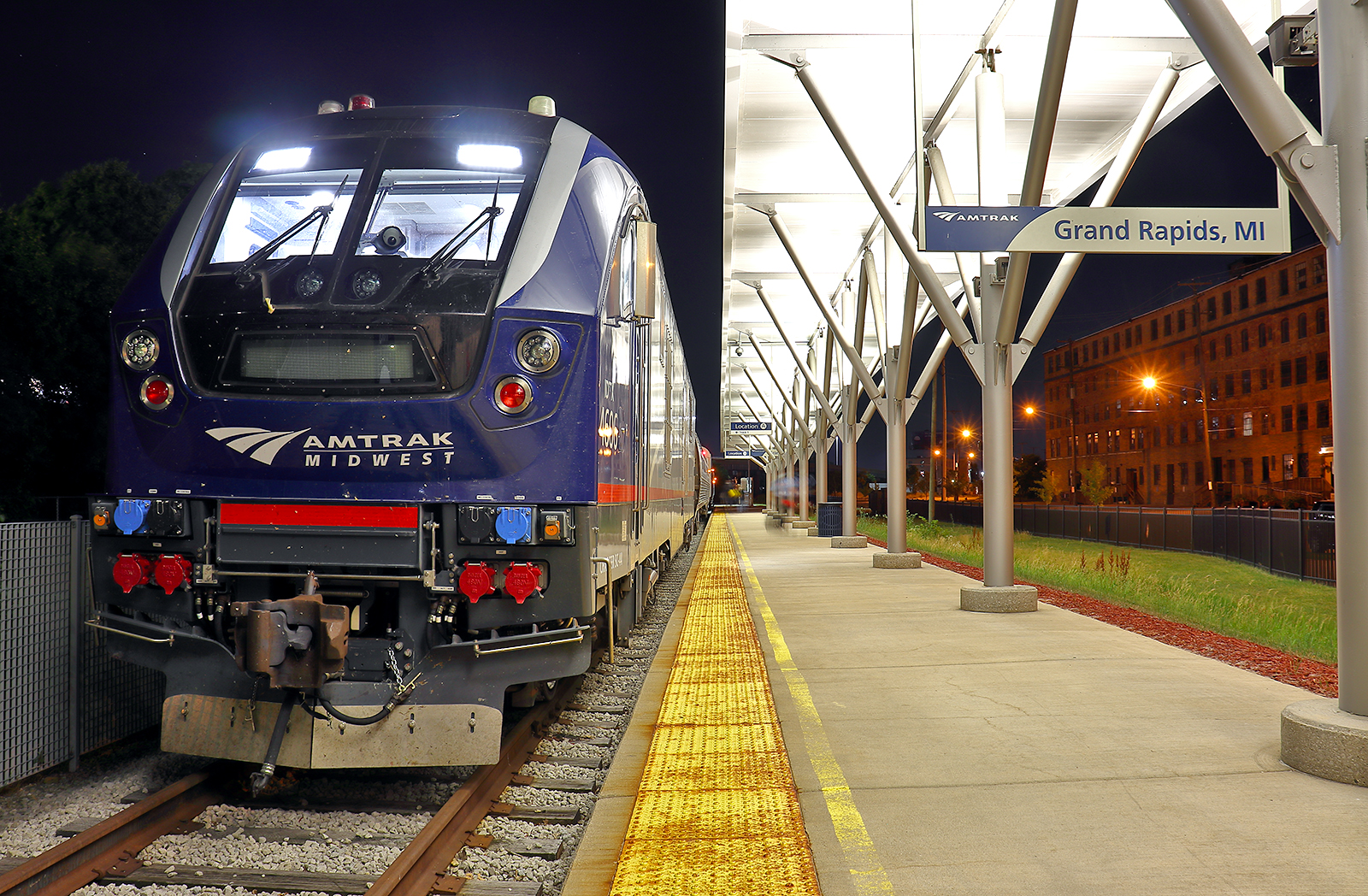
- The Pere Marquette at Grand Rapids, July 2020

Overview
- Service type: Inter-city rail
- Locale: Midwest United States
- Predecessor: Pere Marquette
- First service: August 4, 1984
- Current operator: Amtrak
- Annual ridership: 97,177 (FY 25) ▲3% (Note: Amtrak's Fiscal Year (FY) runs from October 1 of the prior year to September 30 of the named year.)

Route
- Termini: Chicago, Illinois; Grand Rapids, Michigan
- Stops: 4
- Distance travelled: 176 miles (283 km)
- Average journey time: 4 hours
- Service frequency: Daily
- Train number: 370, 371

On-board services
- Classes: Coach Class; Business Class
- Disabled access: Train lower level, all stations
- Catering facilities: Café (snack coach)
- Baggage facilities: Overhead racks

Technical
- Rolling stock: GE Genesis; Superliner
- Track gauge: 4 ft 8 1/2 in (1,435 mm) standard gauge
- Operating speed: Up to 79 mph (127 km/h) (Current); Up to 110 mph (180 km/h) (Planned)
- Track owners: CSX, NS, Amtrak

The Pere Marquette is a passenger train in the United States, operated by Amtrak as part of its Michigan Services on the 176-mile (283 km) route between Grand Rapids, Michigan, and Chicago, Illinois. It is funded in part by the Michigan Department of Transportation and is train 370 eastbound and train 371 westbound. The westbound train leaves Grand Rapids during the morning rush, and the eastbound train leaves Chicago after the afternoon rush, enabling same-day business travel between the two cities.

The train is named for a named train of the defunct Pere Marquette Railway and in turn for Pere Marquette, Michigan, an early name for Ludington. The town was named for Father Jacques Marquette, a French explorer of the Great Lakes region.

== History ==
The original Pere Marquette was a named train of the Pere Marquette Railway, which ran between Detroit and Grand Rapids six times a day. It was extended to Chicago in 1947, when the Pere Marquette Railway was absorbed into the Chesapeake and Ohio Railway. Service ended on April 30, 1971, the day before Amtrak took over intercity rail service in the country.

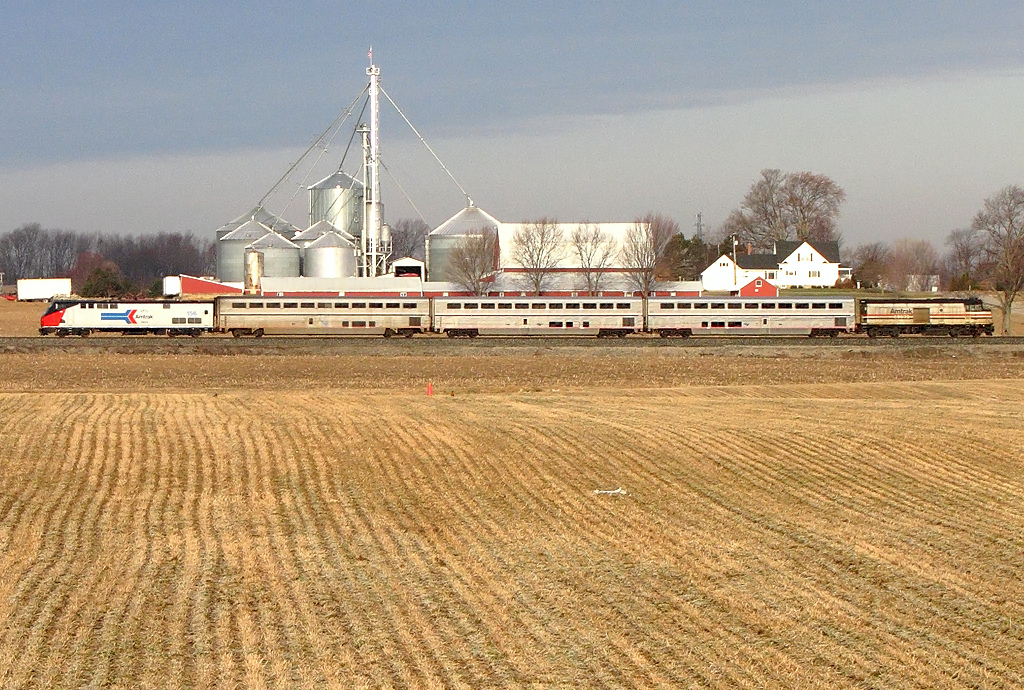
The Pere Marquette in southwestern Michigan in 2011

Amtrak revived the name for a new Grand Rapids–Chicago service on August 5, 1984, with financial support from the state of Michigan. Initially it served Chicago, Hammond–Whiting, New Buffalo, St. Joseph, Bangor, Holland and Grand Rapids. Service at Hammond–Whiting ended April 29, 2001 (although the Wolverine still stops there). Service at New Buffalo ended October 26, 2009, when a new station opened on a different alignment. The 1984-opened station in Grand Rapids was replaced with Vernon J. Ehlers Station on a new spur line in 2014.

On November 30, 2007, the southbound Pere Marquette collided with a Norfolk Southern freight train in Chicago, injuring 71 people. The National Transportation Safety Board (NTSB) determined that the probable cause of the collision was the failure of the Amtrak engineer to interpret the signal at Englewood interlocking correctly and Amtrak's failure to ensure that the engineer had the competence to interpret signals correctly across the different territories over which he operated. The NTSB released its findings on the crash on March 31, 2009.

In March 2020, the Pere Marquette was suspended indefinitely as part of a round of service reduction in response to the ongoing COVID-19 pandemic. The train returned on June 29 with the eastbound run to Grand Rapids, with full service in both directions resuming on June 30. In the interim, Grand Rapids' only connection to the national system was an Amtrak Thruway that connected with the Wolverine at Kalamazoo.

Around 2021, MDOT initiated the design and engineering needed to connect the Amtrak Michigan Line to the CSX tracks north of New Buffalo station. This would allow the Pere Marquette to serve New Buffalo, providing a connection to Blue Water and Wolverine trains. It would also allow for 110 mph (180 km/h) service on the Pere Marquette between New Buffalo, Michigan and Porter, Indiana. On-time performance increased from about 65% in 2019 to about 85% in 2025.

== Operations ==
=== Route ===
The Pere Marquette operates over Norfolk Southern Railway and CSX Transportation trackage:

- Norfolk Southern between Chicago and Porter, Indiana
- CSX between Porter, Indiana and Grand Rapids

=== Equipment ===
A typical Pere Marquette consists of:

- One Siemens Charger locomotive or GE P42DC (lead)
- One married pair of Siemens Venture coach cars and one Amfleet Café / Business car

== Stations ==
State	Town/City	Station	Connections
Illinois	Chicago	Chicago Union Station	Amtrak (long-distance): California Zephyr, Cardinal, City of New Orleans, Empire Builder, Floridian, Lake Shore Limited, Southwest Chief, Texas Eagle; Amtrak (intercity): Blue Water, Borealis, Hiawatha, Illini and Saluki, Illinois Zephyr and Carl Sandburg, Lincoln Service, Wolverine; Metra: BNSF, Heritage Corridor, Milwaukee District North, Milwaukee District West, North Central Service, SouthWest Service; Chicago "L": Blue (at Clinton), Brown Orange Pink Purple (at Quincy); CTA Bus, Pace Bus; Amtrak Thruway to Madison, Rockford (operated by Van Galder), Louisville (operated by Greyhound Lines)
Michigan	St. Joseph	St. Joseph	TCATA
Michigan	Bangor	Bangor	Van Buren Public Transit
Michigan	Holland	Padnos Transportation Center	Macatawa Area Express
Michigan	Grand Rapids	Grand Rapids	The Rapid; Silver Line; Amtrak Thruway
