= Macatawa Area Express =

Public transit service in Holland, Michigan, US

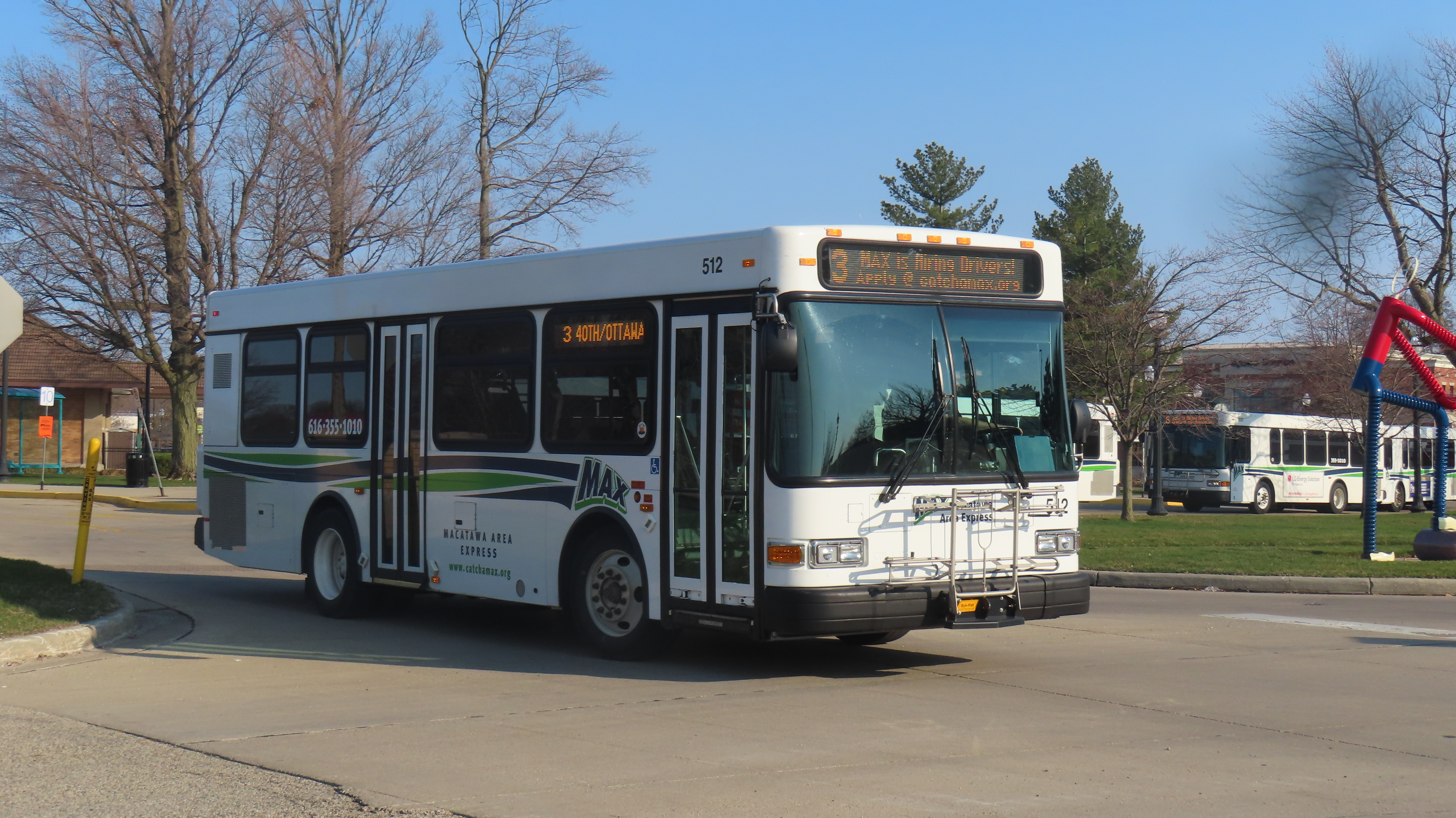
- Headquarters: 171 Lincoln Ave.
- Locale: Holland, Michigan
- Service area: Holland, Holland Township, Zeeland
- Service type: Bus service, Paratransit
- Routes: 11
- Fuel type: Diesel
- Website: catchamax.org

Macatawa Area Express (MAX) is the public transit operator serving Holland, Michigan, providing the area with fixed-route buses and paratransit services. Founded in 2000, the system takes its name from the Macatawa River and Lake Macatawa.

== History ==
MAX was originally established in the year 2000 as an outgrowth of Holland's dial-a-ride bus service. Until July 1, 2007, the system was under Holland city government's direct jurisdiction. Since then, Macatawa Area Express has been governed by an independent Transportation Authority board made up of representatives from the City of Holland and Holland Charter Township.

== Bus service ==
The MAX system consists of eleven fixed routes, supplemented by dial-a-ride service. Fixed routes are operated with a fleet of Gillig Low Floor buses. Each route begins at the top of each hour at the Louis & Helen Padnos Transportation Center, the system's hub in downtown Holland, which is also served by Indian Trails intercity buses and Amtrak's Pere Marquette.

=== Route list ===
- 1 North Mall Area
- 2 Butternut/136th St
- 3 Southshore Area
- 4 Waverly/120th St
- 5 Washington/South River
- 6 Holland Heights
- 7 Lincoln/South Town
- 8 Zeeland
- 9 Twilight Route
- 10 Twilight North
- 11 James/E. Riley

=== Hours of operation ===
Routes 1-8 and 11 operate between 6:00 AM – 7:00 PM on weekdays and 8:00 AM – 7:00 PM on Saturdays; the last trip of each route leaves downtown at 6 PM and returns at 7 PM. Nighttime service is provided by routes 9 and 10 from 7:00 PM to 10:00 PM. MAX service does not run on Sundays.

=== Fares ===
Fares are $1.00 for adults and $0.50 for children between 5–17 years old. Children younger than five and senior citizens ride for free.
