= Donetsk Metro =

Rapid transit system construction project in Donetsk, Ukraine

Coordinates: 48.002778°N 37.805278°E

- One of the construction sites

Overview
- Native name: Ukrainian: Донецьке метро (Donets'ke metro)
- Transit type: Rapid transit
- Line number: 1
- Number of stations: 6

Operation
- Character: Underground

Technical
- System length: 9.6 km (6.0 mi)

The Donetsk Metro (Ukrainian: Донецьке метро, romanized: Donets'ke metro) is a rapid transit system construction project in Donetsk. Construction began in 1993 and was suspended in 2011. If finished, it could become the fifth metro in Ukraine (after the Kyiv, Kharkiv, Dnipro, and Kryvyi Rih metros). Unspecified plans for building instead an all-new light rail surface transit system were announced.

== History ==
When the city of Donetsk reached the million inhabitants mark in the 1980s, it was entitled to build its own metro system, which was designed to follow the usual layout in the Soviet Union. In 1984, the first plans for a metro system in Donetsk were shown to the public, but construction did not immediately begin. Only after Ukraine gained independence, the Cabinet of Ministers issued a decree on 30 December 1991 to build the new underground metro system in Donetsk. The first investigation work began in 1993, and construction commenced the same year, with completion scheduled for 2002.

In 1995, due to the poor financial situation of the Donetsk municipality, the completion date was postponed to 2005. On 5 September 1997, the Prime Minister of Ukraine, Valeriy Pustovoitenko, ordered that the first line of the system should be open to the public in 8 years (2005). In 2000, the first work on four of the six underground stations began. However, the financial situation of Donetsk did not improve. In June 2003, the financial problems affected the metro workers - after seven months of work, no more wages could be paid. By then, nearly 300 million hryvnias (about 48 million euros) had been spent on the project.

In 2004, the Ukrainian government assured further means for the completion of the metro by 2010. By 2007, this seemed over-optimistic due to the slow pace of construction work. However, it later emerged that Donetsk would be one of the host cities for the Euro 2012 football championships, raising hopes for the Metro to be opened by then, although the budget that had been allocated was clearly insufficient at the time.

In 2009, funding of the project was disrupted so severely that construction workers staged several strikes to demand payment of their salaries. The city mayor Oleksandr Lukianchenko informed on 22 May that the planned 500 million hryvnia (~$65 mln) for the metro the city of Donetsk has never received.

In 2011, the city mayor announced that construction was to be suspended indefinitely due to continuing underfunding and inability to finish a first line in time for Euro 2012.

In 2012, the Vice-Prime-Minister Borys Kolesnikov stated that Ukrzaliznytsia was to start to work on the project of ground-level metro in Donetsk. The goal was to open the first line of metro no later than December 2014.

Work on the metro line completely stopped in 2014 when the War in Donbass broke out. In December 2014, the Donetsk People's Republic (DPR) set up a commission to discuss the future of the Donetsk metro. The war greatly compromised most of economic projects that were planned in the Donetsk area due to the chronic socio-economical instability it triggered. Though the DPR publicly proclaimed its intention to complete the metro, the Russian Kremlin did not fund the project. It was reported in January 2022 that the incomplete metro tunnels were at risk of flooding from three sealed coal mines surrounding Donetsk.

== The original project ==
Scheme of the now abandoned metro system

The first underground line of the system, which will carry the name Proletarsko-Kyivska Line (Ukrainian: Пролетарсько-Київська), is to be 9.6 km (6.0 mi) long and have six stations: Proletarska (Пролетарська), Chumakovska (Чумаковська), Chervone Mistechko (Червоне містечко), Mushketovska (Мушкетовська), Livoberezhna (Лiвобережна), and Politekhnichnyi Instytut (Полiтехнiчний iнститут).

The system's red line, Proletarsko-Kyivska, is planned to extend 21 km (13 mi) with 15 stations. Additionally, the blue line, Shakhtarsko-Makiyivska Line (Ukrainian: Шахтарсько-Макiївська), is planned to extend 25 km (16 mi). Finally, the green line, Petrovsko-Chervonohvardiiska Line (Ukrainian: Петровсько-Червоногвардiйська), is to have 14 stations. In its final stage, the Donetsk Metro is planned to be 70 km (43 mi) long, with a total of 46 stations.
