= Beatrice de Gelder =

Cognitive neuroscientist

Beatrice M. L. de Gelder is a cognitive neuroscientist and neuropsychologist. She is professor of Cognitive Neuroscience and director of the Cognitive and Affective Neuroscience Laboratory at the Tilburg University (Netherlands), and was senior scientist at the Martinos Center for Biomedical Imaging, Harvard Medical School, Boston (USA). She joined the Department of Cognitive Neuroscience at Maastricht University in 2012. Her research interests include behavioral and neural emotion processing from facial and bodily expressions, multisensory perception and interaction between auditory and visual processes, and nonconscious perception in neurological patients. She is author of books and publications. She was a Fellow of the Netherlands Institute for Advanced Study, and an elected member of the International Neuropsychological Symposia since 1999. She was a fellow at the Italian Academy at Columbia University in New York in 2017, at the Institute of Advanced Studies in Paris in 2020. Recent grants include an Advanced ERC grant and a Synergy ERC grant.

== Education ==
De Gelder holds degrees in both Philosophy (1967) and Psychology (1969), and received her PhD in philosophy 1972 from the University of Leuven, Belgium. She began her academic career teaching Philosophy of Science, first in Leiden (1973–79) and then in Tilburg (1980–92). In the mid nineties de Gelder began her work in the field of Cognitive and Affective Neuroscience.

== Areas of research ==
De Gelder has innovated in a number of research areas and has contributed significantly to new developments.

- Face recognition: De Gelder has shown that brain damage in one area does not simply lead to loss of a specific function but that intact brain areas can actively interfere with normal function (inverted faces are better recognized than upright ones). This resulted in a new model of face recognition. For this research and as a service to the community she recruited persons with face recognition difficulties through a website.
- Multisensory perception of emotion integrating facial expressions speech prosody: This work was the first to investigate the perceptual combination of facial expression with emotional voice signals and measure EEG. Her team published evidence for emotional face/voice integration in autism and in schizophrenia.
- Nonconscious emotion perception in hemianopia patients (affective blindsight): De Gelder discovered that without V1 cortex, there is still recognition of facial expressions albeit unconsciously, an entirely novel finding that has since then been replicated in different labs.
- Emotional body expressions: In 2003 de Gelder published the first neuroscientific study on emotional body perception. Her team was the first to combine methods of psychology and neuropsychology with novel neuroscience tools – like EEG and fMRI – in research on bodily expressions and have put this topic on the agenda for a new generation of affective scientists.
- Scene context: De Gelder initiated a new research line on the study on emotional scene gist and its effect on face recognition. This opened new perspectives for investigating emotion deficits in schizophrenia and autism.
- Social interaction: De Gelder explored social interaction using realistic stimuli and recently published the first fMRI study using realistic interaction videos of interpersonal threat situations.

== Selected publications ==
- Gelder, B. de, Haan, E.H.F. de, & Heywood, C. (Eds.) (2001). Out of mind: varieties of unconscious processes. Oxford: Oxford University Press.
- Gelder, B. de, & Morais, J. (Eds.) (1995). Speech and reading: a comparative approach. Oxford: Taylor and Francis.
- Gelder, B. de (Ed) (1982) Knowledge and Representation. Routledge & Kegan Paul (International Library of Psychology), 218p.
- Emotions and the body, 2016, Oxford University Press, New York.
