= Van Gelder =

Van Gelder is a Dutch toponymic surname meaning "from/of Guelders", a county and later duchy in the Low Countries. People with the name include:

- Anna van Gelder (1614–1687), wife of the Dutch admiral Michiel de Ruyter
- Arne Van Gelder (born 1997), Belgian acrobatic gymnast
- Cornelia van Gelder (1904–1969), Dutch swimmer
- David van Gelder (born 1940), Israeli fencer
- Dora van Gelder (1904–1999), Dutch-born American writer, psychic, alternative healer
- Edwin van Gelder (born 1978), Dutch graphic designer and art director
- Geert Jan van Gelder (born 1947), Dutch Arabist
- Gordon Van Gelder (born 1966), American science fiction editor
- Hendrik Arend van Gelder (1825–1899), Dutch Mennonite teacher and minister
- J.H. van Gelder (1887–1969), Dutch pediatrician and art collector
- Jack van Gelder (born 1950), Dutch sports commentator and television presenter
- Jan Gerrit van Gelder (1903–1980), Dutch art historian
- Jochem van Gelder (born 1963), Dutch television presenter
- Julie Van Gelder (born 1993), Belgian acrobatic gymnast
- Lawrence Van Gelder (1933–2016), American journalist and magazine editor
- Leslie Van Gelder (born 1969), American archaeologist and writer
- Max van Gelder (impresario) (1872–1943), Dutch impresario
- Max van Gelder (1924–2019), Dutch water polo player
- Nicolaes van Gelder (1636–1676), Dutch still life painter
- Paul van Gelder (1947–2024), Dutch disc jockey
- Peter van Gelder (born 1940), sitarist and educator
- Richard Van Gelder (1928–1994), American mammalogist and museum curator
- Rudy Van Gelder (1924–2016), American music recording engineer
- Tim van Gelder (born 1960s), Australian software engineer
- Tinus van Gelder (1911–1991), Dutch track cyclist
- Yuri van Gelder (born 1983), Dutch gymnast

== See also ==
- Van Galder, surname
- Gelder (disambiguation)
- Van Gelder Paper, Dutch company that has manufactured paper since 1685
- Van Gelder Studio, recording studio in New Jersey established by Rudy Van Gelder
- Van Gelder's bat, Central American bat discovered by Richard Van Gelder
- HNLMS Jan van Gelder, Dutch navy vessel
- Van Gelderen, Dutch surname of the same origin
