= Bangor, Michigan =

- City
- logo

- Location of Bangor, Michigan
- Coordinates: 42°18′48″N 86°6′48″W
- Country: United States
- State: Michigan
- County: Van Buren

Area
  - Total: 1.85 sq mi (4.78 km^{2})
  - Land: 1.77 sq mi (4.59 km^{2})
  - Water: 0.073 sq mi (0.19 km^{2})
- Elevation: 659 ft (201 m)

Population (2020)
  - Total: 2,016
  - Density: 1,137.2/sq mi (439.08/km^{2})
- Time zone: UTC-5 (Eastern (EST))
  - Summer (DST): UTC-4 (EDT)
- ZIP code: 49013
- Area code: 269
- FIPS code: 26-05140
- GNIS feature ID: 0620546
- Website: www.cityofbangormi.org

Bangor is a city in Van Buren County in the U.S. state of Michigan. As of the 2020 census, Bangor had a population of 2,016. The city is located in the northeast corner of Bangor Township, but is politically independent.

It was first organized as a town in 1854 and named after Bangor, Maine.

== Geography ==
According to the United States Census Bureau, the city has a total area of 1.90 square miles (4.92 km^{2}), of which 1.83 square miles (4.74 km^{2}) is land and 0.07 square miles (0.18 km^{2}) is water.

== Demographics ==
Historical population
Census	Pop.	Note	%±
1880	1,102		—
1890	904		−18.0%
1900	1,021		12.9%
1910	1,158		13.4%
1920	1,243		7.3%
1930	1,274		2.5%
1940	1,409		10.6%
1950	1,694		20.2%
1960	2,109		24.5%
1970	2,050		−2.8%
1980	2,001		−2.4%
1990	1,922		−3.9%
2000	1,933		0.6%
2010	1,885		−2.5%
2020	2,016		6.9%
U.S. Decennial Census

=== 2020 census ===
As of the 2020 census, Bangor had a population of 2,016. The median age was 34.4 years. 28.6% of residents were under the age of 18 and 13.0% of residents were 65 years of age or older. For every 100 females there were 83.4 males, and for every 100 females age 18 and over there were 81.9 males age 18 and over.

0.0% of residents lived in urban areas, while 100.0% lived in rural areas.

There were 742 households in Bangor, of which 36.9% had children under the age of 18 living in them. Of all households, 36.5% were married-couple households, 17.3% were households with a male householder and no spouse or partner present, and 36.9% were households with a female householder and no spouse or partner present. About 29.8% of all households were made up of individuals and 11.9% had someone living alone who was 65 years of age or older.

There were 823 housing units, of which 9.8% were vacant. The homeowner vacancy rate was 3.8% and the rental vacancy rate was 5.1%.

Racial composition as of the 2020 census
Race	Number	Percent
White	1,294	64.2%
Black or African American	150	7.4%
American Indian and Alaska Native	28	1.4%
Asian	11	0.5%
Native Hawaiian and Other Pacific Islander	2	0.1%
Some other race	243	12.1%
Two or more races	288	14.3%
Hispanic or Latino (of any race)	552	27.4%

=== 2010 census ===
As of the census of 2010, there were 1,885 people, 707 households, and 464 families living in the city. The population density was 1,030.1 inhabitants per square mile (397.7/km^{2}). There were 835 housing units at an average density of 456.3 per square mile (176.2/km^{2}). The racial makeup of the city was 72.9% White, 11.8% African American, 0.5% Native American, 0.7% Asian, 8.6% from other races, and 5.4% from two or more races. Hispanic or Latino of any race were 14.4% of the population.

There were 707 households, of which 39.9% had children under the age of 18 living with them, 38.2% were married couples living together, 21.2% had a female householder with no husband present, 6.2% had a male householder with no wife present, and 34.4% were non-families. 29.3% of all households were made up of individuals, and 10.6% had someone living alone who was 65 years of age or older. The average household size was 2.66 and the average family size was 3.23.

The median age in the city was 32.9 years. 30% of residents were under the age of 18; 8.7% were between the ages of 18 and 24; 24.6% were from 25 to 44; 24.9% were from 45 to 64; and 11.9% were 65 years of age or older. The gender makeup of the city was 47.6% male and 52.4% female.

=== 2000 census ===
As of the census of 2000, there were 1,933 people, 722 households, and 487 families living in the city. The population density was 995.4 inhabitants per square mile (384.3/km^{2}). There were 804 housing units at an average density of 414.0 per square mile (159.8/km^{2}). The racial makeup of the city was 75.58% White, 12.73% African American, 1.09% Native American, 0.21% Asian, 7.92% from other races, and 2.48% from two or more races. Hispanic or Latino of any race were 12.16% of the population.

There were 722 households, out of which 35.5% had children under the age of 18 living with them, 42.2% were married couples living together, 20.2% had a female householder with no husband present, and 32.5% were non-families. 28.1% of all households were made up of individuals, and 13.0% had someone living alone who was 65 years of age or older. The average household size was 2.66 and the average family size was 3.23.

In the city, the population was spread out, with 30.7% under the age of 18, 10.1% from 18 to 24, 25.9% from 25 to 44, 19.8% from 45 to 64, and 13.5% who were 65 years of age or older. The median age was 33 years. For every 100 females, there were 89.9 males. For every 100 females age 18 and over, there were 82.2 males.

The median income for a household in the city was $28,165, and the median income for a family was $34,500. Males had a median income of $27,159 versus $20,850 for females. The per capita income for the city was $14,925. About 13.2% of families and 16.3% of the population were below the poverty line, including 19.3% of those under age 18 and 16.2% of those age 65 or over.

== Education ==
The Bangor Public Schools consists of one elementary school (grades K-4), Bangor Middle School (grades 5–8), and Bangor High School (grades 9–12). The Bangor District has an Adult Education building as well. The Bangor Vikings compete in the Southwest 10 Conference for sports.

Trinity Lutheran School is a Christian grade school of the Wisconsin Evangelical Lutheran Synod in Bangor.

== Notable people ==
- Grover C. Dillman, engineer and Michigan state highway commissioner from 1929 to 1933; born in Bangor (1889–1979)
- Peter Gent, author of North Dallas Forty; wide receiver with the Dallas Cowboys; Big Ten Conference Medal of Honor (1964); born and died in Bangor (1942–2011) leading Bangor High School to a Michigan state basketball championship in 1960.
- Hall Overton, composer, jazz pianist, and music teacher; born in Bangor (1920–1972)
- Thelma Terry, bandleader and bassist (Thelma Terry and Her Playboys); born in Bangor (1901–1966)

== Transportation ==
- Amtrak train service is available at the Bangor depot via the Pere Marquette train.
- Local bus service is provided by Van Buren Public Transit.
