= Rogers E. M. Whitaker =

Rogers Ernest Malcolm Whitaker (January 15, 1900 – May 11, 1981) was an editor of The New Yorker magazine who was known to readers for his many contributions to Talk of the Town under the pen name of E. M. Frimbo, World's Greatest Railroad Buff.

== Early life ==
Whitaker's father, Charles Harris Whitaker, was an editor of the Journal of the American Institute of Architects. He lectured frequently and transited the Atlantic over 50 times on steamships. When Rogers Whitaker was nine he took his first solo train ride. He developed a love for trains that lasted his entire life.

During Whitaker's sophomore year at Princeton, Whitaker's father declined to continue paying his tuition, and instead gave him $40 and a letter of introduction to use in seeking a job. Whitaker lived in a theatrical boarding house down the hall from Mae West and worked at the New York Times checking bridal announcements for hoaxes placed by jilted suitors while also selling advertising for a trade magazine.

== Career at The New Yorker ==
In 1926, Whitaker was employed by The New Yorker magazine as head of the make-up department, responsible for laying out each issue. He went on to establish the fact-checking department and acted as chief proofreader at the copy desk. Eventually he rose to the level of editor, and took on many duties. He covered college football from 1937 until 1968, signing the pieces "J.W.L." because an editor reportedly liked the look of the letters together. He was also a major contributor to the magazine's "Goings on About Town" section, spending much time at cabarets and supper clubs. Whitaker retired from The New Yorker in 1975.

== E. M. Frimbo ==
Whitaker's greatest love in life was traveling by train. He accumulated 2.7 million miles of such travel during his lifetime, and wrote extensively about his trips under the pen name "E. M. Frimbo," often in collaboration with the staff writer Tony Hiss. He put his knowledge of trains to good use during World War II, where he was commissioned as a Major in the U.S. Army's Traffic Control Division of the Transportation Corps. There he helped to plan the routing of troop trains.

In 1970, Whitaker testified before the Interstate Commerce Commission to argue against the Penn Central Railroad's plan to eliminate all 34 of its long-distance passenger trains.

A year before his death Whitaker appeared in the first episode ("Coast to Coast") of the BBC documentary series Great Railway Journeys, in which he is interviewed by the episode's narrator Ludovic Kennedy.

== Personal life ==
Whitaker was a cat enthusiast who gave his cats names based on unusual criteria. "Epiphany" was named for the important day in the church calendar on which the cat came to his home. "Edward W. Riegelman" was named for a ferryboat he enjoyed riding. "Rosemont" was named for the similarly patterned horse of that name that won the 1935 Withers Stakes at Belmont Park.
