= 1914 in rail transport =

This article lists events related to rail transport that occurred in 1914.

== Events ==
=== January events ===
- January 1 – 1912 international convention agreeing the Berne gauge European standard loading gauge comes into effect.
- January 4 – New Michigan Central Station in Detroit formally inaugurated.

=== March events ===
- March 17 – A celebration is held in honor of the first train to arrive on the newly constructed Kansas City Southern Railway line in Hot Springs, Arkansas.
- March 21 – Henry Clay Hall is appointed to the Interstate Commerce Commission filling the vacancy left by Charles A. Prouty's resignation.

=== April events ===
- April 2 – Construction begins on the Connaught Tunnel in the Selkirk Mountains under Rogers Pass on the Canadian Pacific Railway main line between Calgary, Alberta, and Revelstoke, British Columbia.

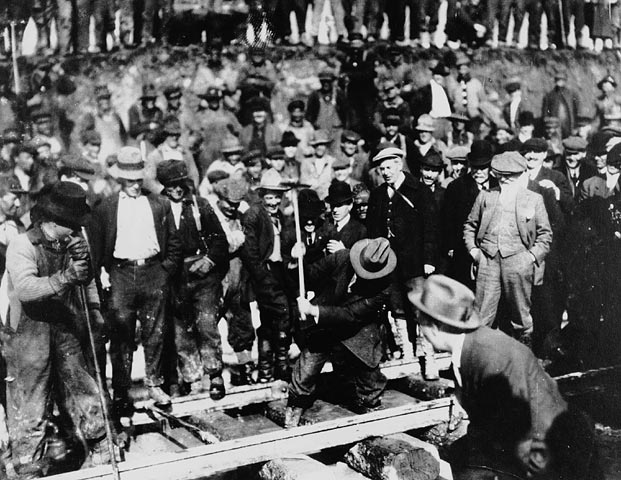
Driving the last spike on the Grand Trunk Pacific Railway, April 7, 1914.

- April 7 – The last spike is driven (pictured) on the Grand Trunk Pacific Railway at Fort Fraser, British Columbia, 93 miles (150 km) west of Prince George, completing the line between Winnipeg and Prince Rupert.
- April 30 – Osaka Electronic Railway Line, Osaka Uehonmachi to Nara route officially completed in Japan (as predecessor of Kintetsu Nara Line).

=== May events ===
- May 17 – Canadian Northern Railway acquires Canadian Northern Ontario Railway.

=== June events ===
- June 18 – A railway bridge collapse at Carrbridge in Scotland following a torrential thunderstorm kills 5 people.
- June 28
  - Archduke Franz Ferdinand of Austria and his wife travel from Ilidža over the 760 mm narrow gauge railway to the Marijin dvor station in Sarajevo (Bosnia-Herzegovina) on an official visit from which they will not return.
  - Compagnie Internationale des Wagons-Lits announces that due to the assassination of Archduke Franz Ferdinand this day at Sarajevo, the Orient Express will terminate in Bucharest and not go on to Constantinople.
- June 29 – The maiden trip on the Portland–Lewiston Interurban is made when the car Arbutus carries an inspection trip from Lewiston to Portland, Maine.

=== July events ===
- July 7 – Regular scheduled service begins on the Portland–Lewiston Interurban in Maine.
- July 11 – The Karkamış to Ceylanpınar line of the Baghdad Railway opens.
- July 15 – Yujiro Nakamura succeeds Ryutaro Nomura as president of South Manchuria Railway.
- July 29 – Railway viaduct over Sava between Zemun and Belgrade is blown up.

=== August events ===
- August 4 – British Government takes control of railways as a wartime measure.
- August 19 – Passenger trains of the Canadian Northern Ontario Railway begin using the Grand Trunk Railway's Central Station in Toronto.

=== October events ===
- October – The Atlantic Coast Line acquires the Florida Central Railroad.
- October 13 – The Algoma Central and Hudson Bay Railway, building northward from Sault Ste. Marie, opens its northernmost section between Oba and Hearst, Ontario.
- October 23 – Northwestern Pacific Railroad is completed connecting Humboldt County, California to the United States rail network.

=== December events ===
- December 20 – Tokyo Station in Japan opens.
- December 29 – San Francisco's Stockton Street Tunnel opens primarily to serve the F Stockton streetcar line.

=== Unknown date events ===
- The railhead of the Central Line (Mittellandbahn) across German East Africa from the coast reaches Kigoma on the shore of Lake Tanganyika.
- The New York Central and Hudson River Railroad simplifies its official name to New York Central.
- The Alaska Northern Railway (a predecessor of the Alaska Railroad) enters receivership. The United States government purchases the road and moves its headquarters to the location that will become Anchorage.
- Magnetic Signal Company is awarded a U.S. patent on an improved wigwag grade crossing signal.
- The first prototype of the Pennsylvania Railroad K4 Pacific steam locomotive class (PRR 1737) is built.
- Baldwin Locomotive Works build the first 2-8-8-8-2 triplex locomotive, Matt H. Shay, for the Erie Railroad.

== Births ==
=== February births ===
- February 10 – Benjamin W. Heineman, president of Chicago and North Western Railway 1956–1972 (died 2012).

=== December births ===
- December 16 – O. Winston Link, American photographer who documents the end of steam locomotive use on the Norfolk and Western Railway in the 1950s (died 2001).

== Deaths ==
=== January deaths ===
- January 21 – Lord Strathcona and Mount Royal, Scottish financier, promoter of the Canadian Pacific Railway (born 1820).

=== March deaths ===
- March 12 – George Westinghouse, American inventor; developed the Westinghouse air brake (born 1846).

=== April deaths ===
- April 26 – George Frederick Baer, president of Reading Company (born 1842).

=== July deaths ===
- July – Melville E. Ingalls, president of the Cleveland, Cincinnati, Chicago and St. Louis Railroad (born 1842).

=== August deaths ===
- August 3 - William Barstow Strong, president of the Atchison, Topeka and Santa Fe Railway 1881–1889 (born 1837).
- August 24 - Darius Miller, president of Chicago, Burlington and Quincy Railroad 1910–1914 (b. 1859).

=== November deaths ===
- November 21 – Thaddeus C. Pound, president of Chippewa Falls and Western Railway and St. Paul Eastern Grand Trunk Railway (born 1832).
