= Gelder, East Azerbaijan =

Gelder گلدر
- Village
- Location within Iran
- Coordinates: 38°47′55″N 46°59′29″E
- Country: Iran
- Province: East Azerbaijan
- County: Kaleybar
- Bakhsh: Central
- Rural District: Peyghan Chayi

Population (2006)
  - Total: 93
- Time zone: UTC+3:30 (IRST)
  - Summer (DST): UTC+4:30 (IRDT)

Gelder (Persian: گلدر; also known as Goldūr) is a village in Peyghan Chayi Rural District, in the Central District of Kaleybar County, East Azerbaijan Province, Iran. At the 2006 census, its population was 93, in 18 families.
