= Vernon J. Ehlers Station =

Train station in Grand Rapids, Michigan, U.S.

Vernon J. Ehlers Station Grand Rapids, MI
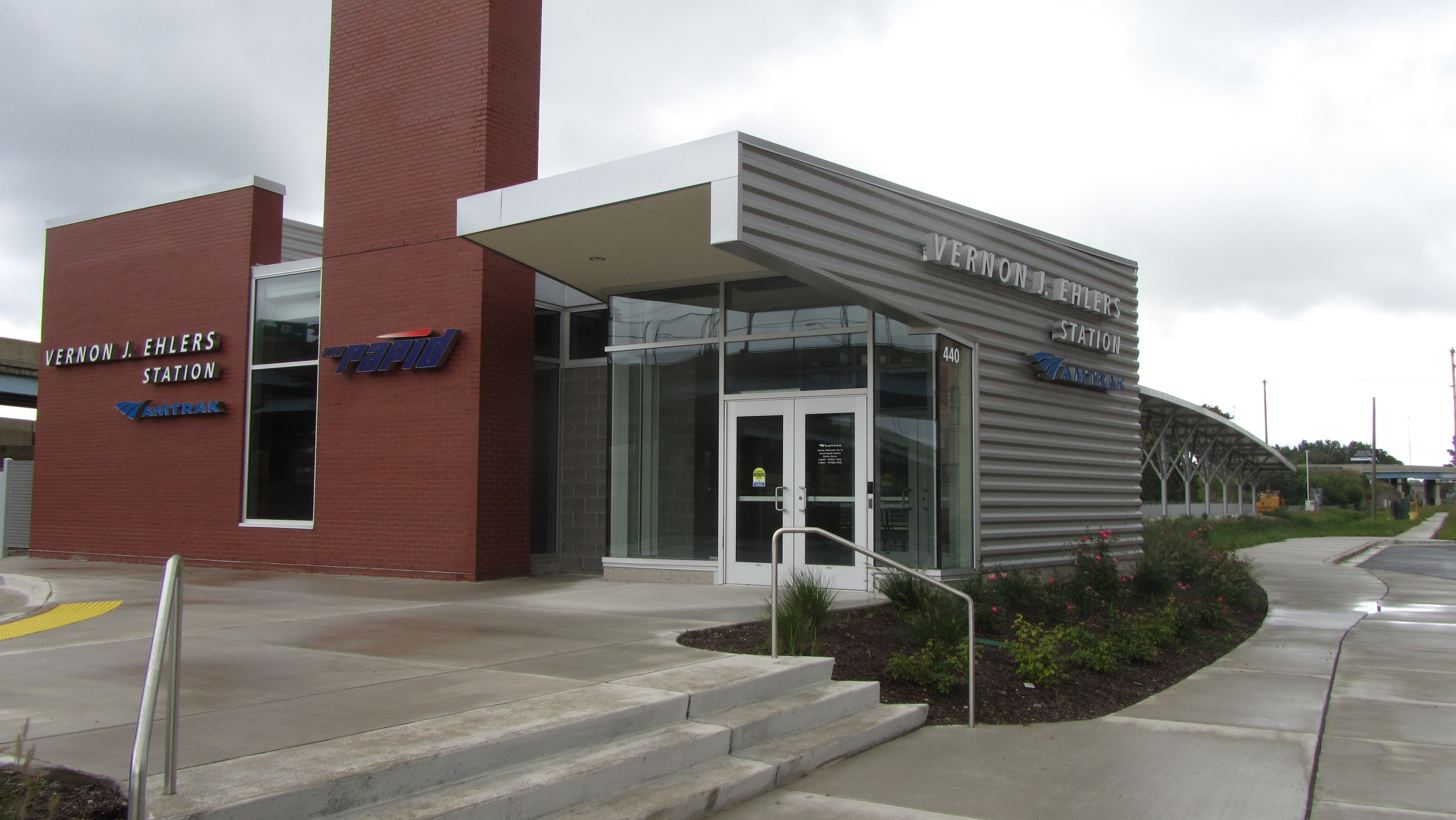
- The station in September 2014

General information
- Location: 440 Century Avenue, S.W. Grand Rapids, Michigan; United States
- Coordinates: 42°57′20″N 85°40′20″W
- Owner: Interurban Transit Partnership
- Line: Spur off CSX Grand Rapids Subdivision
- Platforms: 1 side platform
- Tracks: 1
- Bus operators: Amtrak Thruway
- Connections: Greyhound Lines, Indian Trails and The Rapid (at Rapid Central Station)

Construction
- Parking: Yes
- Cycle facilities: Racks
- Accessible: Yes

Other information
- Station code: Amtrak: GRR

History
- Opened: 1984 at Wealthy/Market
- Rebuilt: 2014

Passengers
- FY 2025: 46,664 (Amtrak)

Services
Preceding station	Amtrak	Following station
Holland toward Chicago	Pere Marquette	Terminus
Location

The Vernon J. Ehlers Station (also called Grand Rapids station) is an Amtrak train station in Grand Rapids, Michigan, United States. It is located on Century Avenue under the Wealthy Street/US Highway 131 overpass, immediately south of The Rapid's Central Station. The station is the eastern terminus of the daily Pere Marquette service. It opened in 2014, replacing a previous station opened in 1984. It is named in honor of former Congressman Vernon J. Ehlers.

== History ==
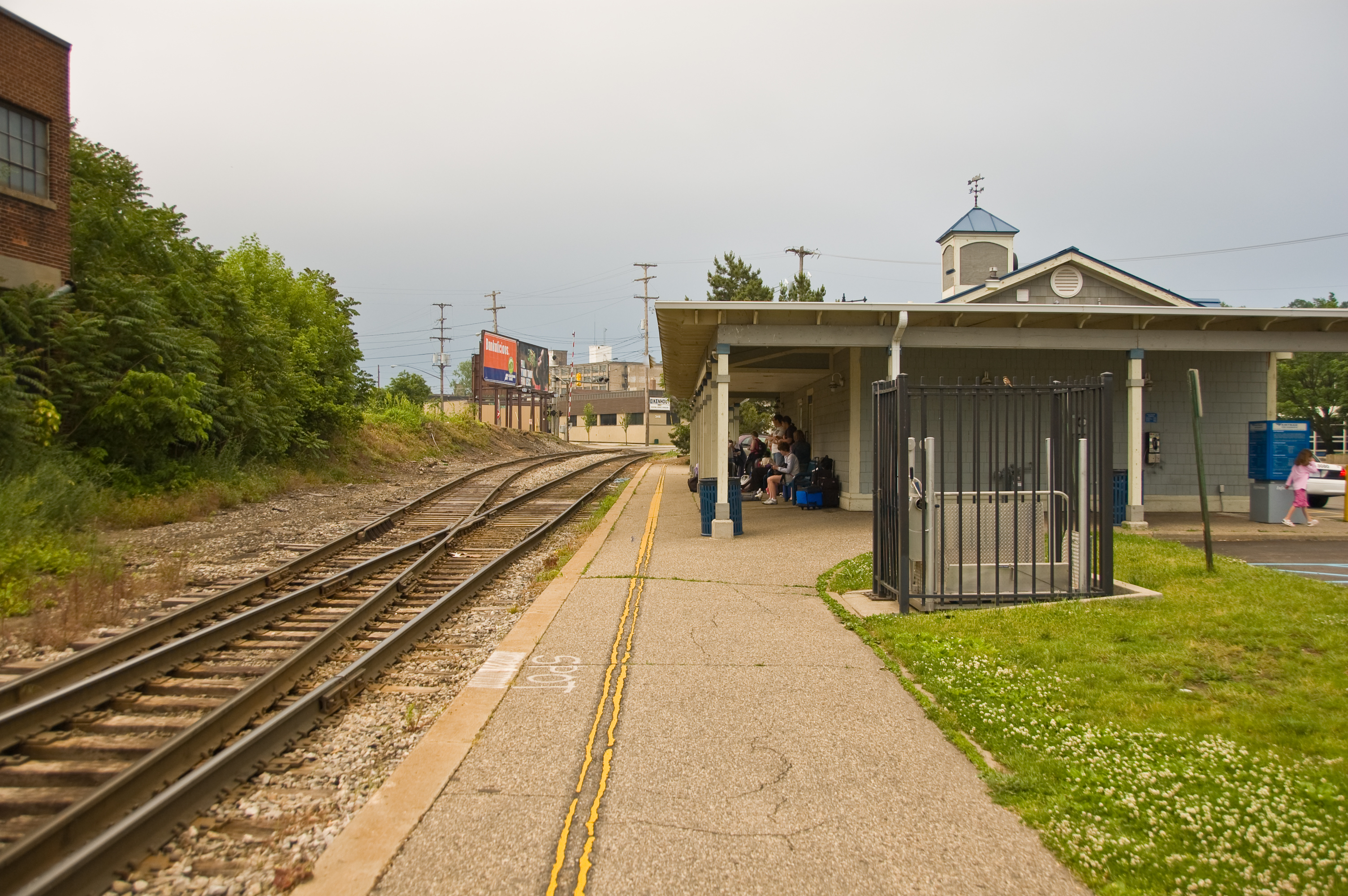
The former Grand Rapids station, used from 1984 to 2014

The earlier Union Station (1900) was demolished, 1958–1959, to make way for US Highway 131 expansion into a freeway. Several companies ran passenger trains through the station: New York Central Railroad, Pennsylvania Railroad and Pere Marquette Railway later assumed by the Chesapeake and Ohio Railway. Passenger service ended on April 30, 1971.

In 1984, Amtrak announced it would introduce service from Grand Rapids to Chicago. The city quickly planned a new temporary depot at the corner of Wealthy Street and Market Avenue, with the hope that it would be replaced by a multimodal facility including bus service "within a few years." Construction by Kalamazoo-based Opus One Construction was completed in less than one month. Service debuted on August 5, 1984. What was intended to be a temporary station was instead used for 30 years.

Funding for a new station at the corner of Wealthy and Century Avenue was approved in 2010. In October 2011, groundbreaking occurred on the new station. It is named in honor of former Michigan Congressman Vern Ehlers. The new station enables fully intermodal transit while allowing for more efficient train turnarounds. It was funded by a US$3.8 million grant from the Federal Railroad Administration and $850,000 from the City of Grand Rapids.

Due to delays in construction from CSX and the City of Grand Rapids, the station construction started in the summer of 2013. The new station opened on October 27, 2014.

Like its predecessor, the station has no checked baggage service, and is open one hour before trains arrive. However, a Quik-Trak kiosk is available. An Amtrak Thruway route runs between this station and Kalamazoo to connect with the Wolverine.

== Transit connections ==
Central Station lies a short distance north of the new Amtrak station.
