= Van Galder =

Van Galder is a surname. Notable people with the surname include:

- Clark Van Galder (1909–1965), American football player, basketball player, track athlete, and coach
- Tim Van Galder (1944–2022), American football player

== See also ==
- Van Gelder, surname
