= 1870 in rail transport =

This article lists events related to rail transport that occurred in 1870.

== Events ==
=== January events ===
- January 20 – The Elizabeth City and Norfolk Railroad, which later becomes the original Norfolk Southern Railroad, is chartered to build a railroad line between Norfolk, Virginia, and Elizabeth City, North Carolina.

=== February events ===
- February 24 – Delaware and Hudson Canal Company leases the Albany and Susquehanna Railroad, which extends from Albany to Binghamton, New York.

=== March events ===
- March 7 – The Great Indian Peninsula Railway opens the link between Itarsi and Jabalpur where it connects with the East Indian Railway, completing the rail connection across India from Bombay to Calcutta.
- March 24 – Pennsylvania Railroad signs a 999-year lease of the Erie and Pittsburgh Railroad.
- March 28 – Construction on the Kansas Pacific Railway reaches Kit Carson, Colorado.

=== June events ===
- June – The Denver Pacific Railway completes construction of its mainline between Denver, and Cheyenne, Wyoming.

=== July events ===
- July 24 – The first railroad car to travel the entire distance from the Pacific to the Atlantic coast of the United States arrives in New York City.

=== August events ===
- August
  - Construction crews on the Kansas Pacific working eastward from Denver and westward from Kansas City meet at Strasburg, Colorado.
  - The Atchison, Topeka and Santa Fe Railroad, building westward from Topeka, reaches Emporia, Kansas.
- August 2
  - The Texas legislature approves the Missouri–Kansas–Texas Railroad (MKT) charter, which was originally granted by Kansas, allowing the MKT to build into the state.
  - Official opening of the Tower Subway beneath the River Thames in London. Although this lasts as a railway operation only until November, it demonstrates the technologically successful first use of the cylindrical wrought iron tunnelling shield devised by Peter W. Barlow and James Henry Greathead and of a permanent tunnel lining of cast iron segments.
- August 15 - Construction on the Kansas Pacific Railroad, building westward from Kansas, reaches Denver, Colorado.

=== September events ===
- 12 September [O.S. 31 August] 1870 – Russian emperor Alexander II inaugurates through services between Saint Petersburg and Helsinki (Finnish Railways).
- September 12 – Completion of the Portland and Ogdensburg Railroad from Portland, Maine to Sebago Lake causes abandonment of the parallel Cumberland and Oxford Canal.

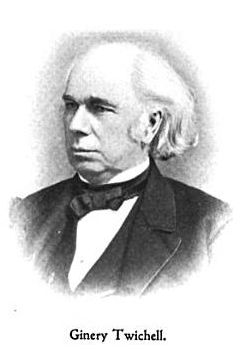
Ginery Twichell, about the time he was president of the Santa Fe

- September 24
  - Ginery Twichell succeeds Henry Keyes as president of the Atchison, Topeka and Santa Fe Railway.
  - The Colorado Central Railroad completes construction of its mainline between Golden, Colorado and Denver.

=== October events ===
- October 12 – The Southern Pacific Railroad and Central Pacific Railroad operations are merged under the Southern Pacific name.
- October 24 – First railway in the Governorate of Estonia is opened on the route Paldiski–Reval (Tallinn)–Narva–Gatchina. It is connected with the Saint Petersburg–Warsaw railway in the same year. Also this year, the line is extended from Gatchina to Tosno, so connecting to the modern-day October Railway.

=== December events ===
- December 12 – The Stairfoot rail accident in England kills 15 people
- December 26 – The Hatfield rail crash (1870) in England kills 8.

=== Unknown date events ===
- Northwestern Pacific Railroad predecessor San Francisco and North Pacific Railroad begins service between San Francisco Bay and Santa Rosa, California.
- Joy valve gear for steam locomotives is patented in the United Kingdom.

== Births ==
=== July births ===
- July 29 – Henry Fowler, Chief Mechanical Engineer of the Midland Railway 1909–1923 and of the London, Midland and Scottish Railway 1925–1931 (d. 1938).

== Deaths ==
=== April deaths ===
- April 26 – Zerah Colburn (locomotive designer) (suicide) (b. 1832).

=== December deaths ===
- December 8 - Thomas Brassey, English railway contractor who supervised the construction of more than 6500 miles (10461 km) of track around the world (b. 1805).
- December 16 – Byron Kilbourn, president of Milwaukee and Mississippi Railroad 1849–1852 (b. 1801).

=== Unknown date deaths ===
- George S. Griggs, pioneering master mechanic of American steam locomotives (b. 1805).
