= Grand Rapids Subdivision =

Railway line in Michigan

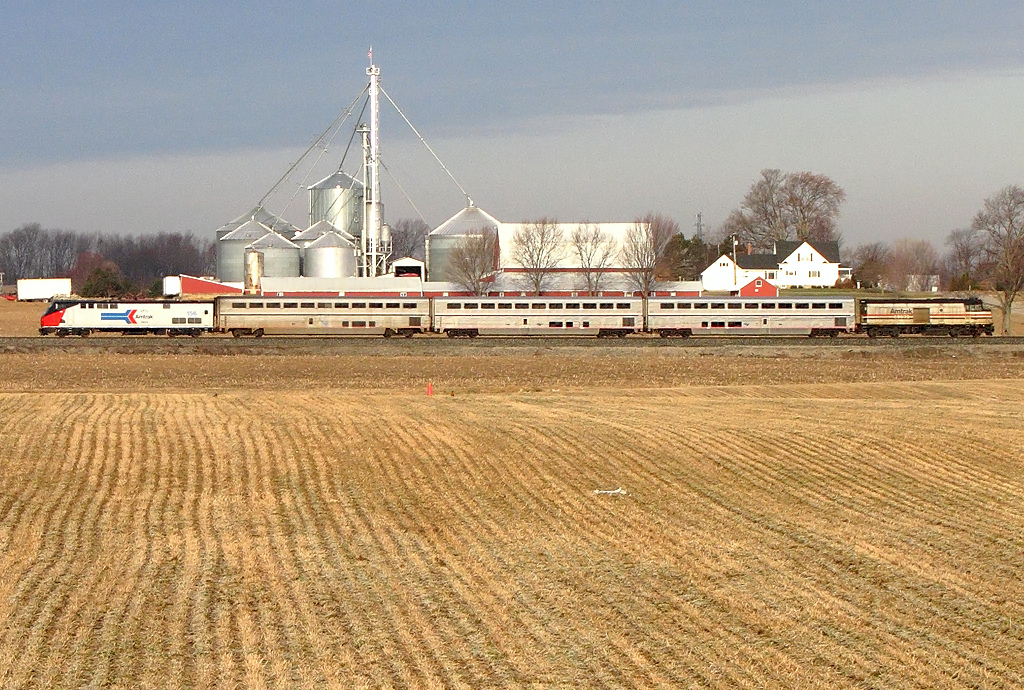
- The Pere Marquette on the Grand Rapids Subdivision

Overview
- Owner: CSX Transportation
- Locale: Michigan and Indiana
- Termini: Porter, Indiana; Grand Rapids, Michigan

Service
- Services: Pere Marquette

History
- Opened: 2 February 1870

Technical
- Line length: 136 mi (219 km)
- Track gauge: 1,435 mm (4 ft 8 1/2 in) standard gauge

The Grand Rapids Subdivision is a railroad line in Western Michigan and Northern Indiana. It runs 136 miles (219 km) from Porter, Indiana to Grand Rapids, Michigan. It was built between 1870–1903 by the Chicago and Michigan Lake Shore Railroad and its successor the Pere Marquette Railroad. CSX Transportation owns the line today. In addition to freight traffic, the line hosts Amtrak's daily Pere Marquette.

== Route ==
The northern end of the line is in Grand Rapids, Michigan, where it meets the Grand Rapids Terminal Subdivision at Wyoming Yard. From there, the line runs west-southwest toward Indiana, roughly following the Lake Michigan coastline but staying inland until Benton Harbor, Michigan. In New Buffalo, Michigan, the line crosses over Amtrak's Michigan Line but there is no interchange. In Porter, Indiana, the line joins with the Chicago Line of the Norfolk Southern Railway.

== History ==
The Chicago and Michigan Lake Shore Railroad opened the oldest part of the line on February 2, 1870, running between St. Joseph, Michigan, and Union Pier, Michigan, on the Indiana border. In 1871–1872 the line was further extended to Grand Rapids, Michigan. The Pere Marquette Railway, successor to the Chicago and Michigan Lake Shore, extended the line south from Union Pier to Porter, Indiana, in 1903.
