= Knightstown =

Knightstown may refer to the following places:

- Knightstown, County Kerry, Ireland
- Knightstown, Indiana, United States
  - Knightstown Academy
  - Knightstown Historic District

== See also ==
- Knightstone (disambiguation)
