= Richmond Downtown Historic District =

Historic district in Indiana, United States

- U.S. National Register of Historic Places
- U.S. Historic district
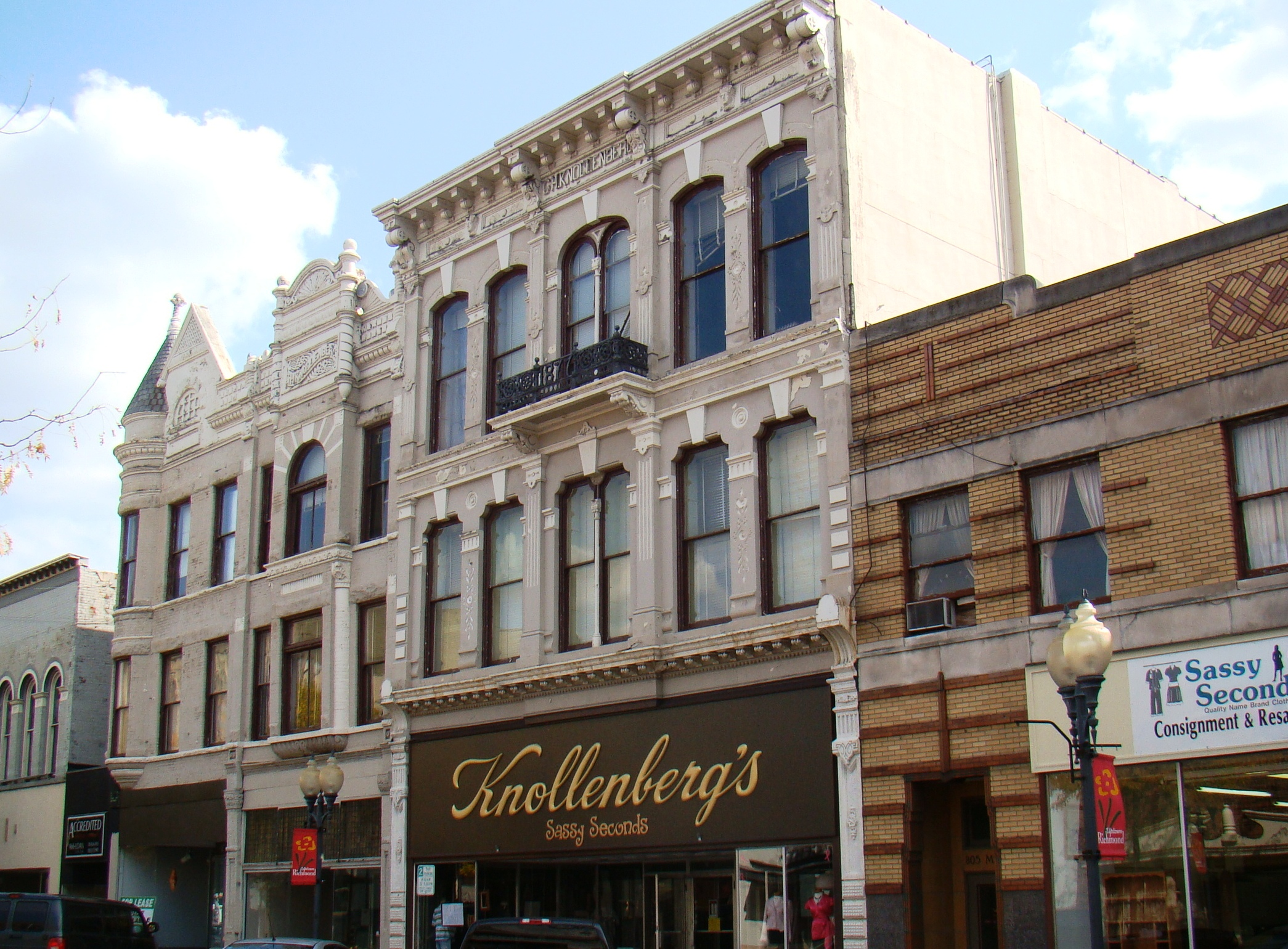

- Location within Indiana Location within the United States
- Location: Roughly Main St. between 7th & 10th Sts. & N. 8th St. between Main & A Sts. in Richmond, Indiana
- Coordinates: 39°49′44″N 84°53′30″W
- Area: 13 acres (5.3 ha)
- Architect: Multiple, including John A. Hasecoster, George F. Barber, James Knox Taylor, Harry Hussey
- Architectural style: Mixed
- NRHP reference No.: 11000918
- Added to NRHP: December 19, 2011

The Richmond Downtown Historic District is an area of primarily commercial buildings and national historic district located at Richmond, Indiana. The district encompasses 47 contributing buildings located along the National Road. It developed between about 1868 and 1960 and includes representative examples of Italianate, Romanesque Revival, Queen Anne, Classical Revival, and Chicago School style architecture. Located in the district is the separately listed Murray Theater. Other notable buildings include the I.O.O.F. Building (1868), Hittle Building (1878), Tivoli Theater (1926), Romey's Building (1920), George H. Knollenberg Building (1877), Kresge Building (c. 1930), Dickinson Building (1880), former U.S. Post Office (1905), and YMCA (1908).

The district was added to the National Register of Historic Places in 2011.

== See also ==
- Starr Historic District
- Richmond Railroad Station Historic District
- Reeveston Place Historic District
- East Main Street-Glen Miller Park Historic District
- Old Richmond Historic District
- Richmond, Indiana explosion
