= Lighthouse Christian Academy (Bloomington, Indiana) =

Location
- 1201 West That Road; Bloomington, Monroe County, Indiana 47403; United States
- 39.113915°N 86.545417°W

Information
- Other name: LCA
- Type: Private Christian
- Motto: Living for the Lord, Caring for Community, Advancing in Academics
- Established: 1991
- Superintendent: Tim Day
- Faculty: 36
- Grades: PreK-12
- Enrollment: 306 (2023-2024)
- Color
- Athletics conference: Southern Roads
- Team name: Lions
- Website: www.mylca.info

Lighthouse Christian Academy is a private Christian school located in Bloomington, Indiana, United States.

== Academics ==
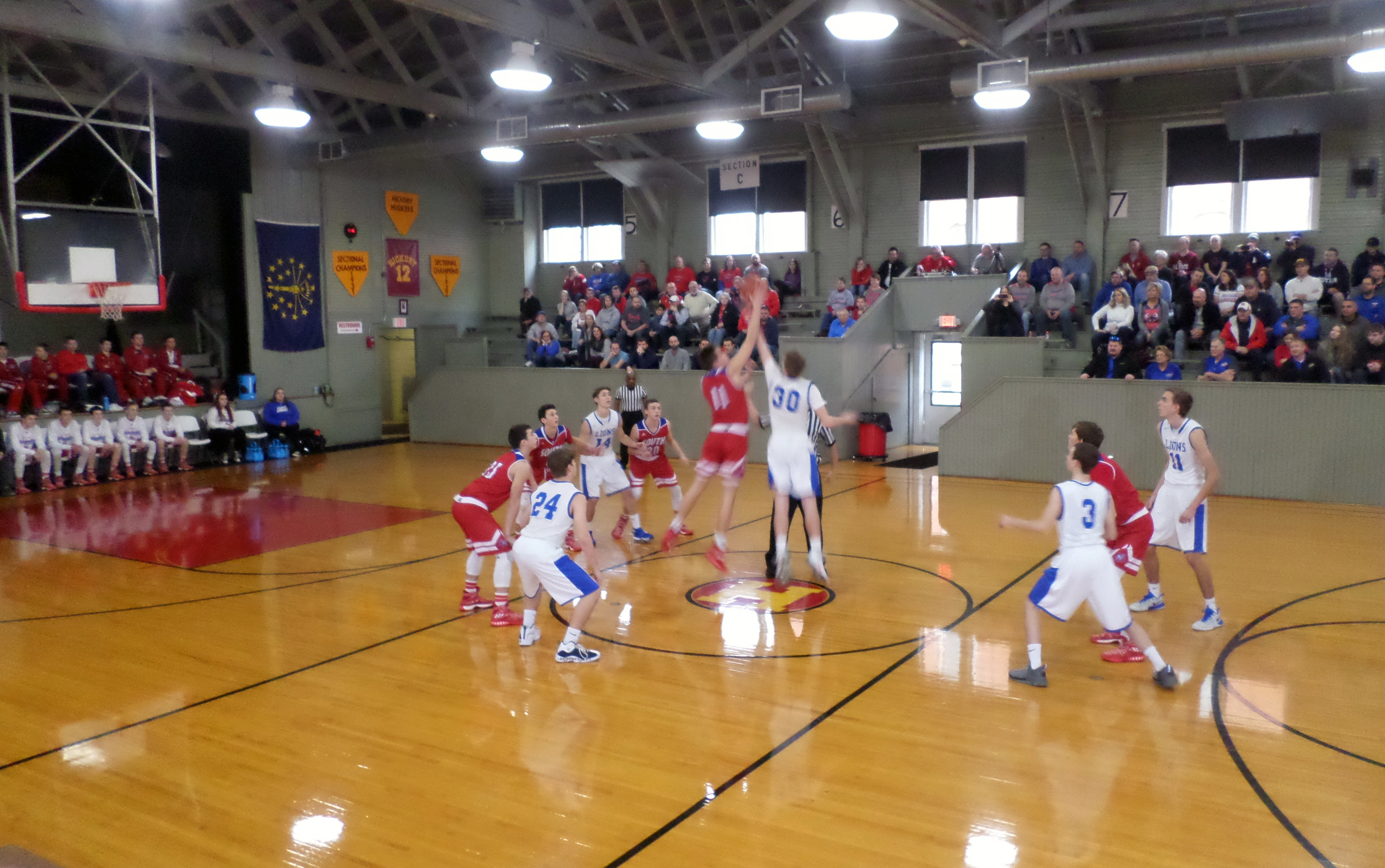
Hoosier Gym during a high school basketball game between Lighthouse Christian Academy and South Ripley High School in January 2017

Lighthouse Christian Academy currently hosts 269 students in grades PreK–12. At school, each student participates in a distinct, Bible-based curriculum designed to achieve the goals laid forth in the school mission statement, "to develop each child's Christ-like character, intellectual ability, and physical health for the glory of God." In early elementary, students are instructed in topics ranging from language arts classes to Math and Science. Special classes in elementary school include music, art, and PE. The middle-school provides a smooth transition from elementary school into high-school, with special classes changing to electives. The middle and high schools boast choir, band, and art (including photography) electives.

Lighthouse Christian Academy seeks an entirely Bible-based approach to instruction. While all students attend Bible classes throughout the entirety of their education, each class is instructed from a Christian perspective.

== Controversy ==
=== National ===
Lighthouse Christian Academy has recently come under fire regarding their admissions policy.

Rep. Katherine Clark, D-Massachusetts, cited Lighthouse Christian Academy's enrollment brochure, which states that the private school can refuse admission or discontinue enrollment of a student living in a home environment that includes 'homosexual or bisexual activity' or 'practicing alternate gender identity'.

Parents are free to choose which school best comports with their religious convictions ... For a real choice and thus real liberty to exist, the government may not impose its own orthodoxy and homogenize all schools to conform to politically correct attitudes and ideologies.

— a statement issued by spokesman Brian Bailey on behalf of the academy.

== See also ==
- List of high schools in Indiana
