= The Teddy Bear Master =

- Release date: 2006
- Running time: 78 minutes
- Country: United States
- Language: English

The Teddy Bear Master is a 2006 American film produced by a group of high school students which depicts a teacher being harassed by teddy bears during class, then later being killed by them, after he humiliates a student. The 78-minute film attracted international attention when it became the subject of two separate legal actions, firstly after the school expelled the students involved, then later when a math teacher who shared the surname of the teacher in the film sued the producers for provoking "reasonably foreseeable emotional disturbance or trauma".

== Background ==
The boys – Isaac Imel, Harrison Null, Charlie Ours, and Cody Overbay, students at Knightstown Intermediate School in Indiana – worked on the film through the 2005–06 academic year, giving it a limited release on DVD among friends in Summer 2006. Their film depicted a teacher by the name of Clevenger being harassed – and later killed – by evil teddy bears, and the choice of name displeased their Mathematics teacher, who was also named Clevenger. Seeing the film as a threat to Clevenger, the school expelled the students. Two of the boys later sued, with a third joining the lawsuit later on, and they were eventually re-instated. Clevenger then launched a separate legal action against the four students for damages.

== Plot summary ==
After he is embarrassed by his teacher, a student dubbed "The Teddy Bear Master" brings a group of stuffed teddy bears to life, then orders them to kill the teacher, Mr. Clevenger. A group of students battle the bears in an attempt to save Clevenger, but Clevenger and his wife ultimately come to a sticky end.

== Responses ==
In November 2006, the American Civil Liberties Union of Indiana sued the school on behalf of two of the teenagers, Isaac Imel and Cody Overbay, arguing that school officials had violated the students' First Amendment rights, (i.e., that their free speech had been curtailed) and that the school had overreacted to what was described as a film parody. In response, school officials argued that the film was disruptive, particularly as the teacher who shared his name with the fictional teacher had regarded it as threatening. But while US District Judge Sarah Evans Barker described the film as "vulgar", “tasteless", "humiliating" and "obscene", she did not believe school officials had proved it to be disruptive to school and ruled that the students should be allowed to return and to make up any work they had missed as a result of being expelled. The students were also ordered to write letters of apology to the teacher. A third student, Charlie Ours, later joined the action, while the fourth boy involved did not contest the expulsion. In March 2007 the board of the Charles A. Beard School Corp. voted 5–2 to settle the lawsuit with $69,000 worth of compensation being paid to the students. The boys also had the expulsion expunged from their school records.

On May 16, 2007, Daniel Clevenger – the Indianapolis-based teacher concerned – filed a lawsuit for damages against the four boys. The lawsuit claimed that the film had mocked the teacher's appearance and mannerisms, as well as containing "graphic depictions of violence" and the murder of Clevenger and his wife. It stated: "The defendants intentionally created the 'Teddy Bear Master' and intentionally used the plaintiff's name in such a way that would provoke a reasonably foreseeable emotional disturbance or trauma." A Sky News report from June 2007 quoted Clevenger as saying the students were aware that using his name would "provoke a reasonably foreseeable emotional disturbance or trauma", while his wife, Christine, said of the work: "The only thing I can say is they have wronged my husband... He's a very good person, he is a wonderful teacher, he's a wonderful father, and he's a wonderful husband".
