= East Main Street–Glen Miller Park Historic District =

Historic district in Indiana, United States

- U.S. National Register of Historic Places
- U.S. Historic district
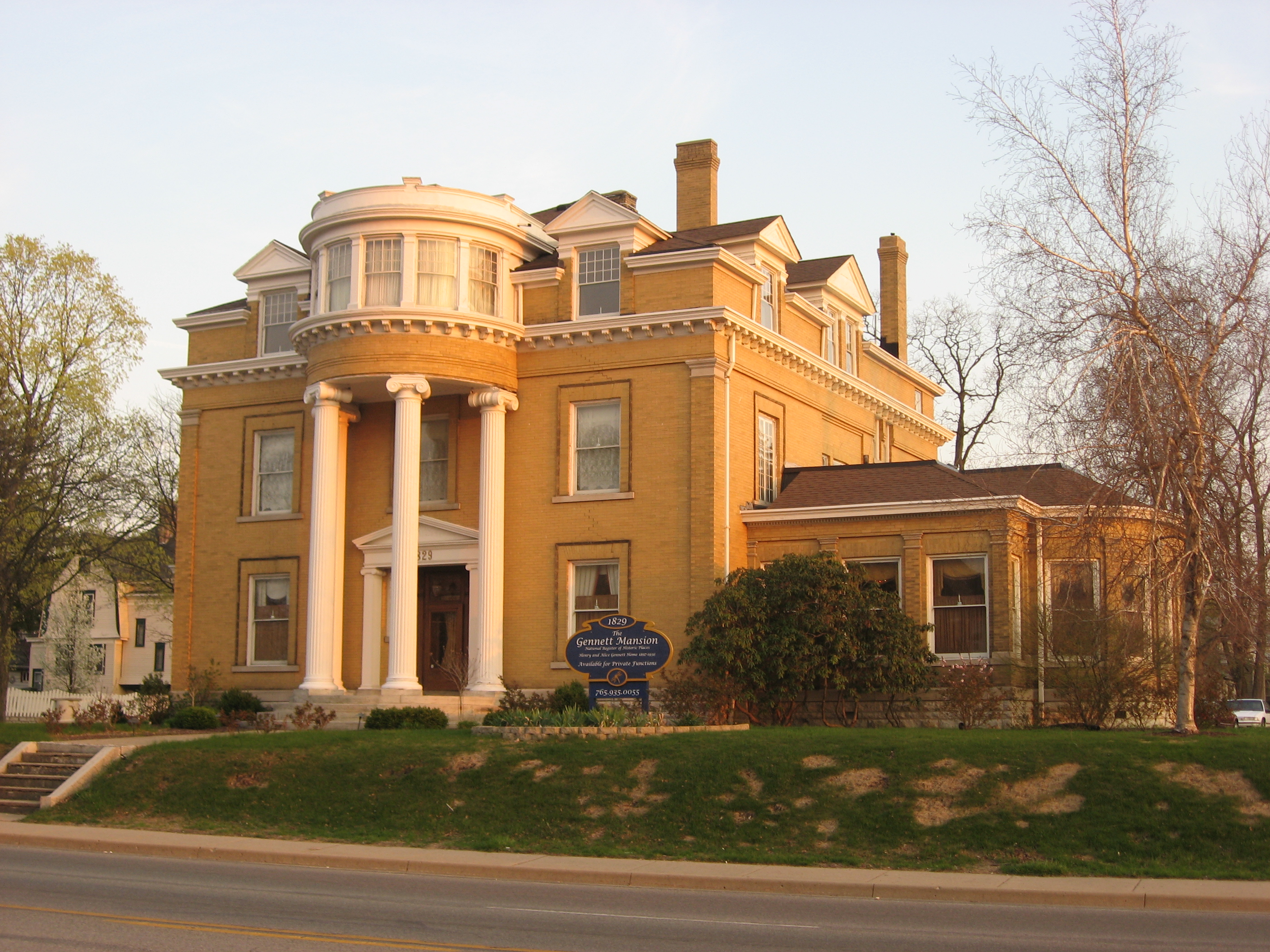
- Henry and Alice Gennett home designed by John A. Hasecoster

- Location within Indiana Location within the United States
- Location: Both sides of E. Main St. from N. 18th to N. 30th Sts. and Glen Miller Park east of 30th St., Richmond, Indiana
- Coordinates: 39.831082°N 84.865794°W
- Area: 216 acres (87 ha)
- Architect: Multiple, including John A. Hasecoster
- Architectural style: Victorian, Colonial Revival, Tudor Revival, Craftsman
- NRHP reference No.: 86000612
- Added to NRHP: March 27, 1986

The East Main Street–Glen Miller Park Historic District is a neighborhood of historic residential buildings and national historic district located at Richmond, Indiana. The district encompasses 84 contributing buildings, 11 contributing structures, and five contributing objects along the National Road (US 40) and sometimes called Millionaire's Row. A portion of the district is recognized by the City of Richmond's Historic Preservation Commission as the Linden Hill conservation district. It developed between about 1830 and 1937 and includes representative examples of Italianate, Queen Anne, Colonial Revival, Tudor Revival, Classical Revival, and Bungalow / American Craftsman style architecture. Located in the district is the separately listed Henry and Alice Gennett House. Other notable contributing resources include elaborate iron bridges (c. 1895) and "Madonna of the Trail" statue located in Glen Miller Park, Isham Sedgwick House (1884–1885), John A. Hasecoster House (1895), William H. Campbell House (1905), Howard Campbell House (1909), E.G. Hill House (c. 1880, c. 1900), Crain Sanitarium (c. 1900), and Dr. T. Henry Davis House (c. 1902).

Homes included in the district are those of Henry and Alice Gennett and architect John A. Hasecoster.

Glen Miller Park was named for Colonel John Miller, the original owner of the land, and glen, the type of terrain found there.

The district was added to the National Register of Historic Places in 1986.

== See also ==
- Old Richmond Historic District
- Starr Historic District
- Richmond Railroad Station Historic District
- Reeveston Place Historic District
- Richmond Downtown Historic District
