= Hinshaw =

Hinshaw is a surname. Notable people with the surname include:

- Ashley Hinshaw (born 1988), American actress and model
- Alexander Omar Hinshaw (born 1982), American Major League Baseball
- Andrew Jackson Hinshaw (1923–2016)
- Deena Hinshaw, Canadian public health official
- Edmund Howard Hinshaw (1860–1932), Nebraska republican
- Dr. Horton Corwin Hinshaw (1902–2000), Pioneer in the treatment of tuberculosis
- Jerry E. Hinshaw (1917–2003), member of the Arkansas House of Representatives from 1981 to 1996
- John Carl Hinshaw (1894–1956), United States Representative
- Stephen P. Hinshaw (born 1952), American psychologist
- Waldo Stephen Hinshaw (born 1940), Pioneer in the development of Magnetic Resonance Imaging (MRI) technology

== See also ==
- Hinshaw's, a department store chain in Southern California
- Hinshaw Music, music publisher in Chapel Hill, North Carolina
- Elias Hinshaw House
