= Dayton Union Station =

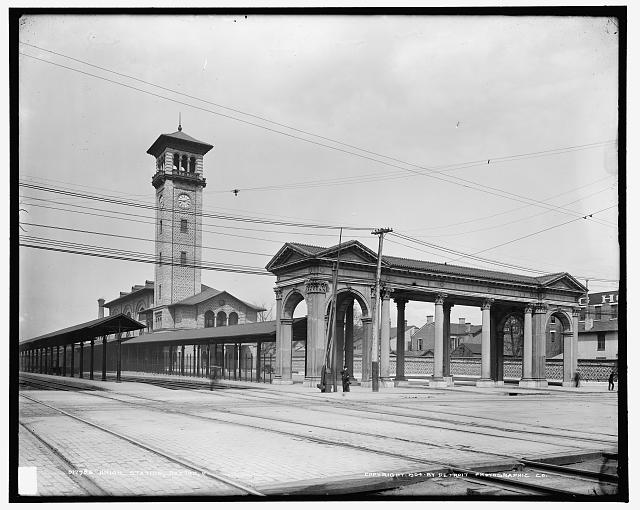
- Dayton Union Station in 1904

General information
- Location: 130 West 6th Street; Dayton, OH 45402
- Coordinates: 39.7548°N 84.1940°W
- Elevation: 740 ft (230 m)
- System: inter-city rail station

History
- Opened: 1900
- Closed: 1979

Former services
Preceding station	Amtrak	Following station
Richmond toward Kansas City	National Limited	Columbus toward New York or Washington, D.C.
Preceding station	Baltimore and Ohio Railroad	Following station
Whitfield toward Cincinnati	Toledo Division	Johnson toward Detroit
Preceding station	New York Central Railroad	Following station
West Carrollton toward Cincinnati	Cincinnati – Cleveland	Osborn toward Cleveland
Preceding station	Pennsylvania Railroad	Following station
Richmond toward St. Louis	St. Louis – Pittsburgh via Dayton	Alpha toward Pittsburgh
National toward Cincinnati	Cincinnati, Lebanon and Northern Railway	Terminus
Location

Dayton Union Station was a railroad station serving Dayton, Ohio with daily passenger trains of several railroads. The station was located at 251 W. Sixth Street at the intersection of Ludlow Street, and it opened in 1900, replacing an earlier depot built in the mid-1850s. It was owned by the Dayton Union Railroad Co., which was owned by the Cincinnati, Hamilton and Dayton Railway, the Cleveland, Cincinnati, Chicago and St. Louis Railway, and the Pittsburgh, Cincinnati, Chicago and St. Louis Railroad. Through a series of mergers over the years, it was ultimately owned by the New York Central Railroad, Baltimore & Ohio Railroad, and Pennsylvania Railroad.

Colloquially called the "Tower Depot," it included a seven-story clock tower. In the first 30 years of operation, the station hosted as many as 66 passenger trains a day. In 1931 the station opened an elevated platform to alleviate congestion between trains, streetcars and automobiles.

Famous people who stopped by the station included child actress Shirley Temple in 1944, President Harry S. Truman in 1948 and President Ronald Reagan in 1983, both of the latter two making campaign stops, Reagan making a whistle stop tour.

A passenger at Dayton Union Station, 1905

== Named trains ==
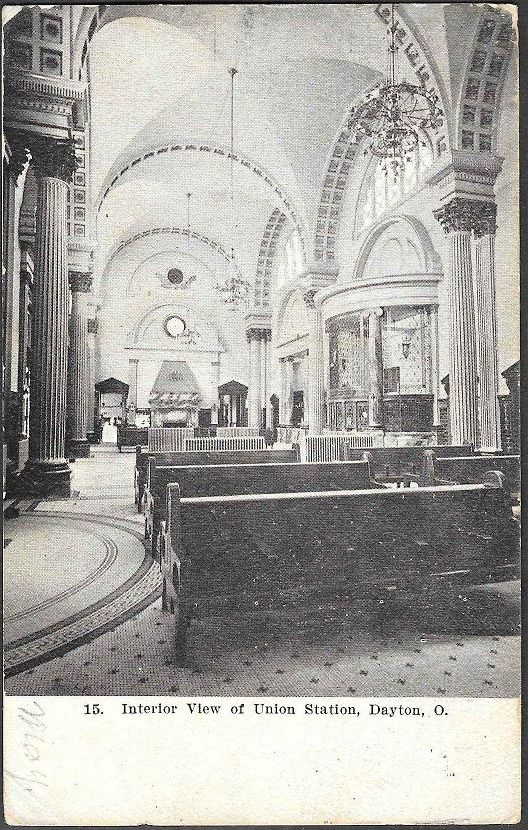
Station interior, 1908

Operator	Named train	Western or northern destination	Eastern or southern destination	Year begun	Year discontinued
Amtrak	National Limited	Kansas City, Missouri	New York, New York	1971	1979
Baltimore and Ohio	Great Lakes Limited	Detroit, Michigan	Cincinnati, Ohio	1947	1950
Baltimore and Ohio	Cincinnatian	Detroit, Michigan	Cincinnati, Ohio	1950	1971
Baltimore and Ohio	Night Express	Detroit, Michigan	Cincinnati, Ohio	1960	1967
Cleveland, Cincinnati, Chicago and St. Louis New York Central (after 1930)	Cincinnati Mercury	Cincinnati, Ohio	Cleveland, Ohio	1952	1956
Cleveland, Cincinnati, Chicago and St. Louis New York Central (after 1930)	Cleveland Special / Cincinnati Special	Cincinnati, Ohio	Cleveland, Ohio	1919–1924; 1932	1957
Cleveland, Cincinnati, Chicago and St. Louis New York Central (after 1930)	Michigan Special / Ohio Special	Detroit, Michigan	Cincinnati, Ohio	1930	1958
Cleveland, Cincinnati, Chicago and St. Louis New York Central (after 1930)	Midnight Special succeeded by the Night Special	Cincinnati, Ohio	Cleveland, Ohio	1939 successor: 1958	1958 successor: 1967
Cleveland, Cincinnati, Chicago and St. Louis New York Central (after 1930)	Northern Arrow	Mackinaw City, Michigan	Cincinnati, Ohio	1935	1961
New York Central Railroad	Ohio State Limited	Cincinnati, Ohio	New York, New York	1924	1967
New York Central Railroad	Queen City	Detroit, Michigan	Cincinnati, Ohio	1949	1957
New York Central Railroad	Florida Sunbeam	Detroit, Michigan	Miami, Florida	1936	1949
Pennsylvania Railroad	American	St. Louis, Missouri	New York, New York	1925	1956
Pennsylvania Railroad	Buckeye	Chicago, Illinois	Columbus, Ohio	1957	1969
Pennsylvania Railroad	Indianapolis Limited	Indianapolis, Indiana	New York, New York	1950; 1953	1957
Pennsylvania Railroad; Penn Central (1968–1970)	Penn Texas	St. Louis, Missouri	New York, New York	1948	1970
Pennsylvania Railroad; Penn Central (1968–1971)	Spirit of St. Louis	St. Louis, Missouri	New York, New York	1927	1971
Pennsylvania Railroad	St. Louisan	St. Louis, Missouri	New York, New York	1913	1967

== Decline ==
In summer 1964 part of the station was demolished to make way for an extension of Sixth Street. Amtrak took over passenger service in 1971, and cut back service to a single train, the Spirit of St. Louis, inherited from Penn Central. That train was subsequently extended to Kansas City and renamed the National Limited.

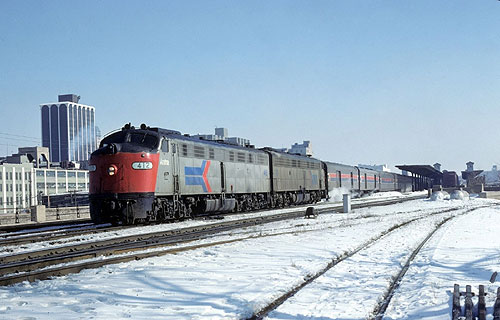
The National Limited at the station in February 1978

The last train out of the station was the National Limited, which was eliminated in October, 1979 when U.S. Transportation Secretary Brock Adams opted to eliminate half a dozen Amtrak routes he deemed lower performing. The last remnants of the station were removed altogether in 1989.
