= Hoosier Gym =

American sports facility built 1921

Coordinates: 39.799985°N 85.524796°W

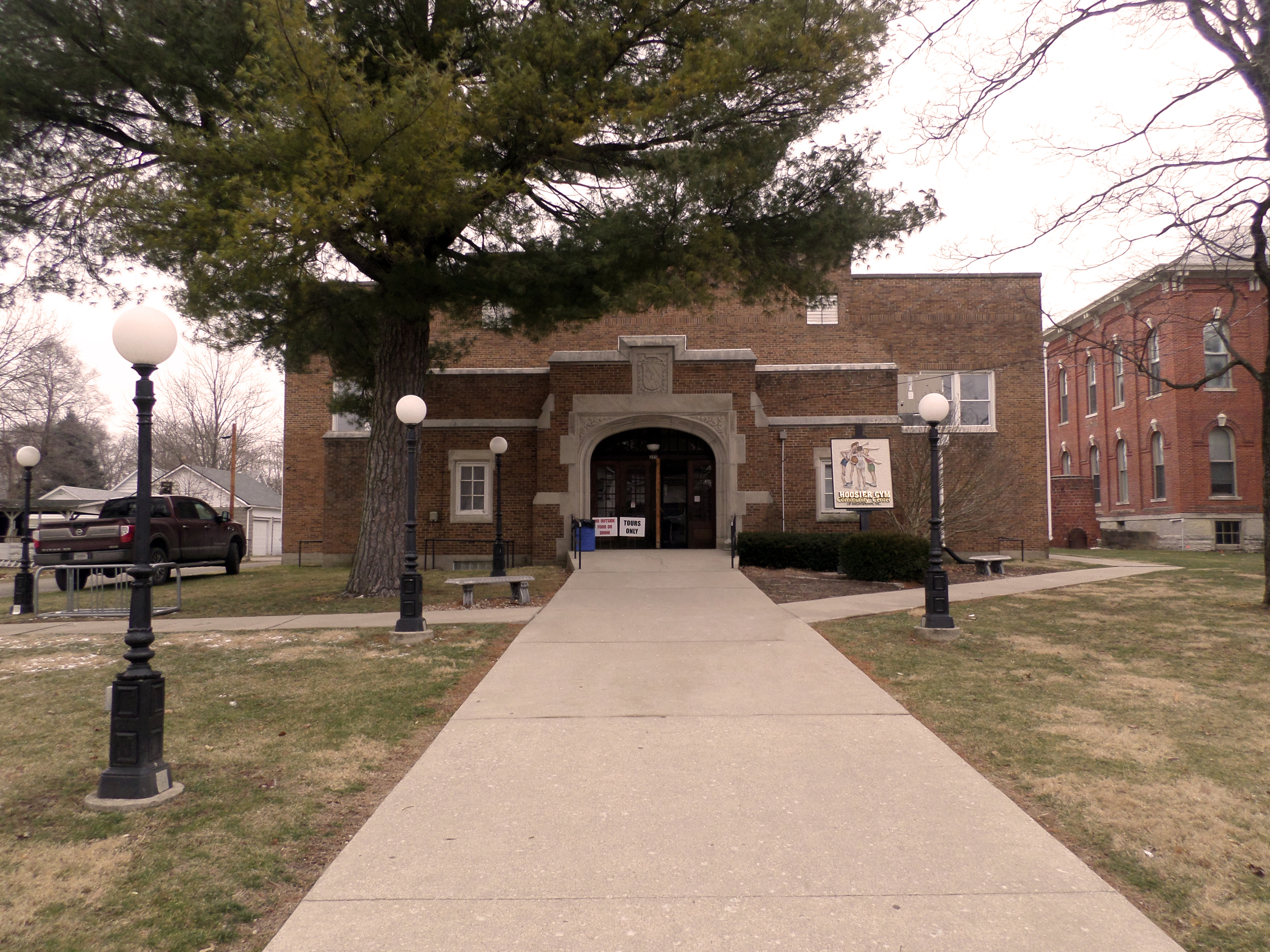
Hoosier Gym in January 2017

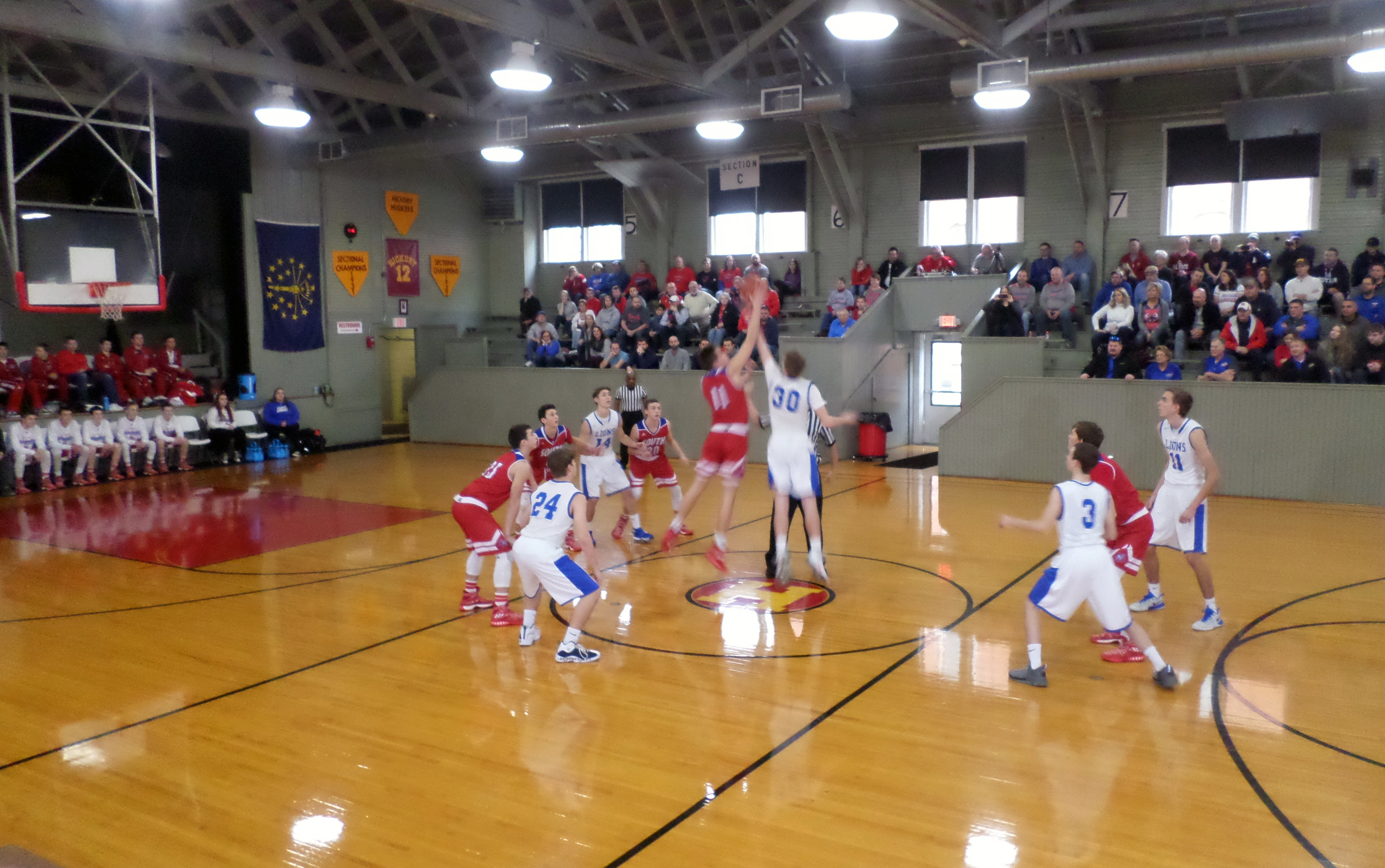
Hoosier Gym during a high school basketball game between Lighthouse Christian Academy and South Ripley High School in January 2017

Hoosier Gym is a basketball gymnasium, museum, and community center located in Knightstown, Indiana. It is famous for being a filming location for the 1986 basketball movie Hoosiers, starring Gene Hackman and Dennis Hopper. The gym was the home court of the movie's Hickory Huskers. The facility has retained the same appearance as when the movie was filmed in 1985. The gym attracts 80,000 tourists to the town per year.

== History ==
=== Initial construction ===
In 1920, the Knightstown Community School had no gymnasium. Basketball games were held in Bell's Hall above Jolly's Drugstore and in the basement gym of the Presbyterian Church.

In February 1921, a half-dozen Knightstown businessmen met to discuss the fact that Knightstown was lagging behind other towns in the development of children's athletic education. After much debate, a plan to build a "gymnasium and community house" was developed and approved. To help fund the new gym, they raised more than US$14,400 (equivalent to $253,900 in 2024) in donations from more than 250 citizens and several local businesses.

Finally, on December 1, 1921, construction of the gym was completed. At 105 feet (32 m) long and 80 feet (24 m) wide, the new gym was big enough to accommodate not only basketball games and spectators (with bleacher seating around the sides and end of the playing floor), but also many civic and community-oriented events.

Upon completion of the new construction, it became evident that additional funds would be needed for maintenance and custodial services, including heat and lighting. It wasn't long before arrangements were made for several professional basketball teams to play on the new floor, including the EmRoes, Michigan Rails, and Baltimore Orioles. The town even persuaded players from various colleges to compete against local teams.

Within four years, the school board made the final payment on the gymnasium and took full control of the building.

=== Additional construction ===
As Knightstown grew, so did the demands for the gym. In 1936, the school board used local and federal Works Progress Administration funds to make major improvements. The project included an exterior facelift with a new front entrance and lobby, and the creation of basement dressing rooms.

In 1952, the gym was expanded again. In order to accommodate the school's growing art, music, and science departments, three classrooms, a kitchen, and restrooms were added on the east end of the building.

=== Closure ===
By 1966, the gym had become obsolete with the building of a new high school and gym. The Panthers of Knightstown played their last official regular-season basketball game at the gym that February. So after 45 years of serving the community and providing a place for its young people to grow and develop, the gym was closed. For the next 19 years, the old gym saw little use.

=== Hoosiers ===
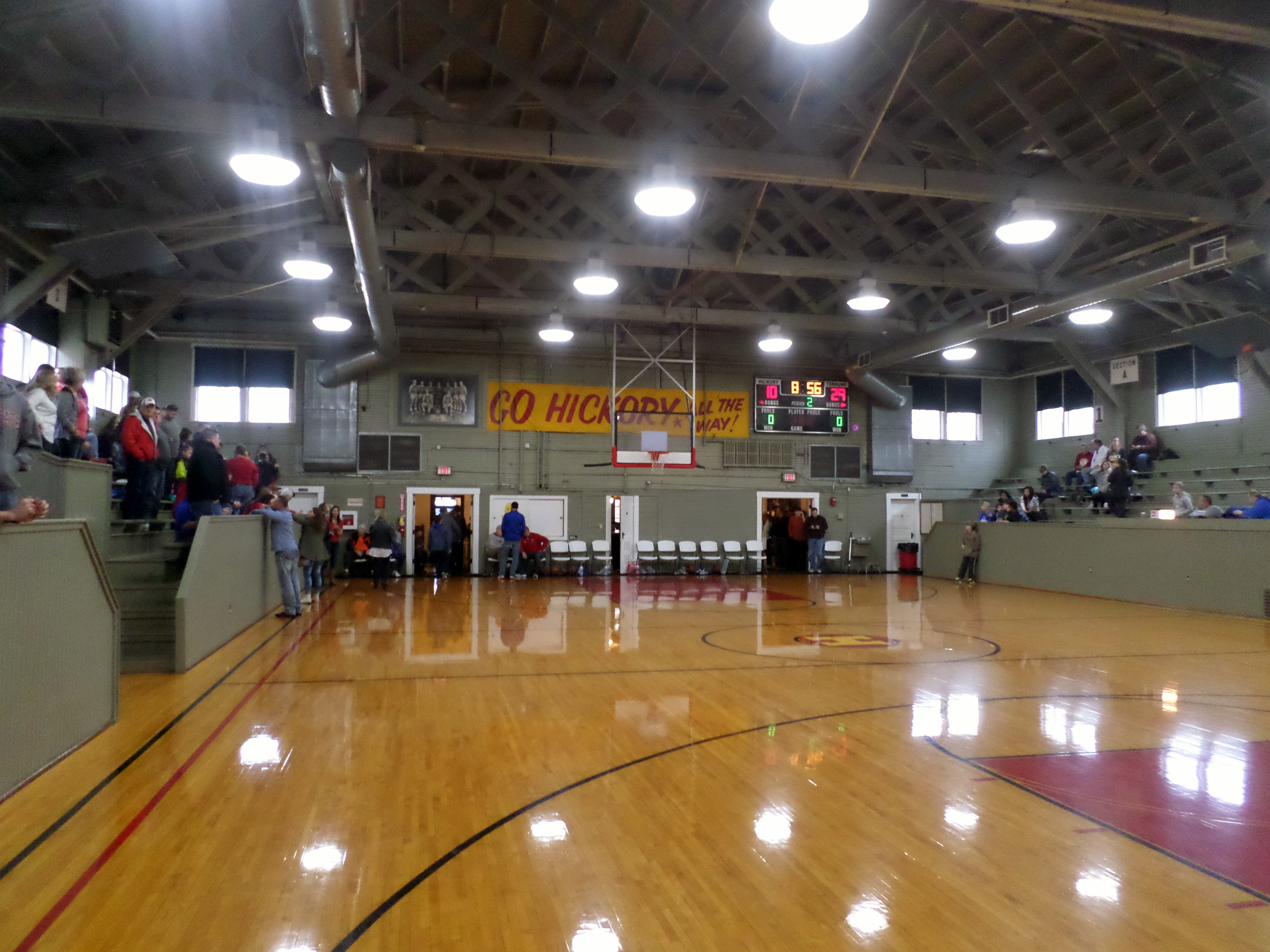
Interior of the gym in 2017. Note the gym remains decorated in the same manner as during the 1986 film. The "Go Hickory" banner can be seen on the wall. To the left of that is the team photo from the film.

In 1985, interest in the gym increased when a film crew descended upon Knightstown, looking for a place to film Hoosiers. The movie told the story of the unique phenomenon known as Hoosier Hysteria — Indiana's obsession with basketball. The gym provided the perfect setting. About one third of the film was filmed in the gym. As a result of the success of this film, the old Knightstown gymnasium came to be known as the Hoosier Gym.

== Reopening ==
By 1988, the gym faced possible demolition as the 112-year-old school next door, then serving as an elementary school, was replaced by a new school north of town. The old school became an apartment building. Two groups, Historic Knightstown and Historic Landmarks of Indiana, stepped forward to help preserve the gym. Now it hosts 80 high school basketball games a year. Additionally, each year the gym holds the Hoosiers Reunion All-Star Classic, where Indiana's best high school athletes play against each other, with the teams named "Hickory" and "Terhune," as in the movie.
