= High school basketball =

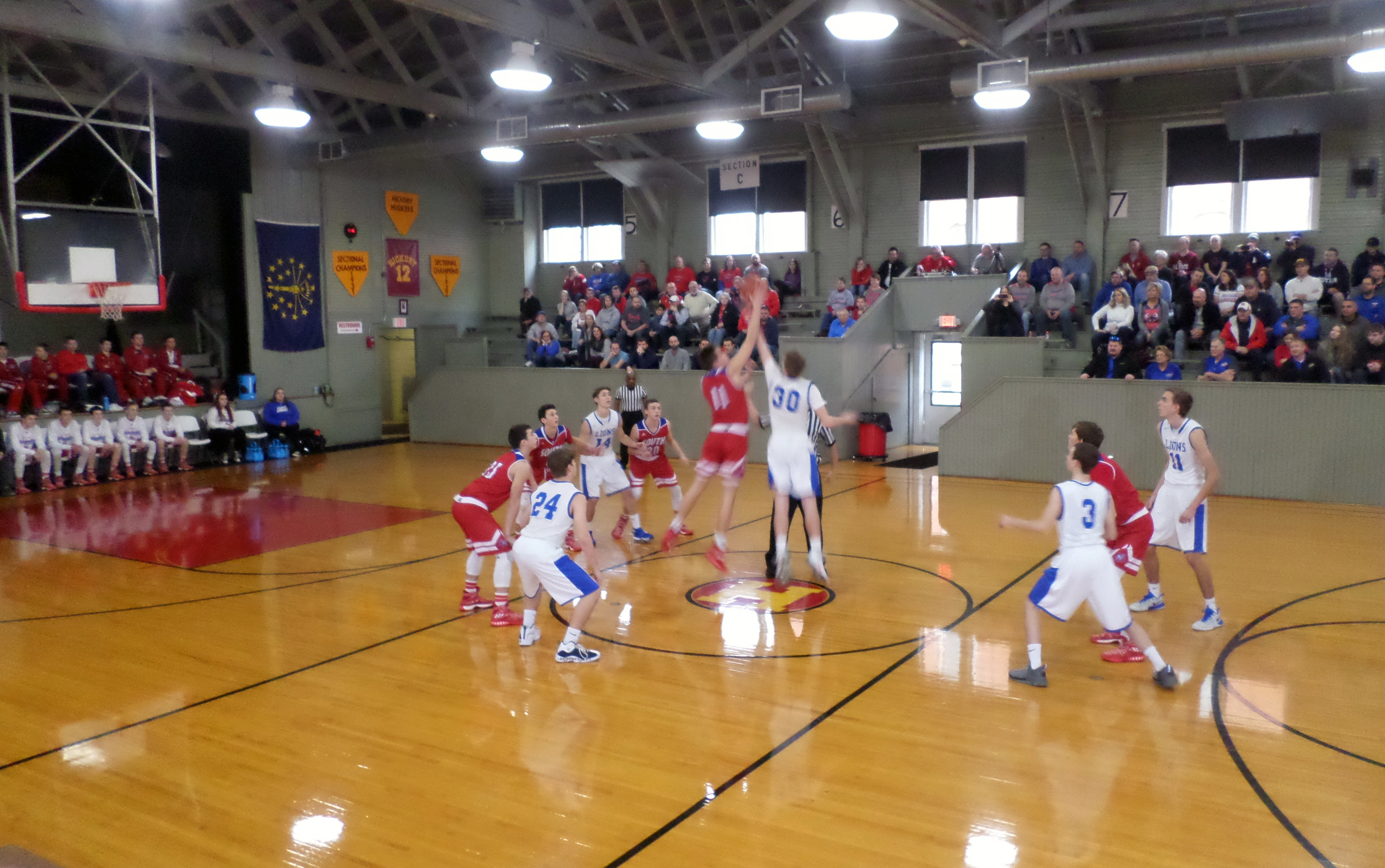
- A high school basketball game at Hoosier Gym in Knightstown, Indiana in January 2017
- Governing body: NFHS in the United States

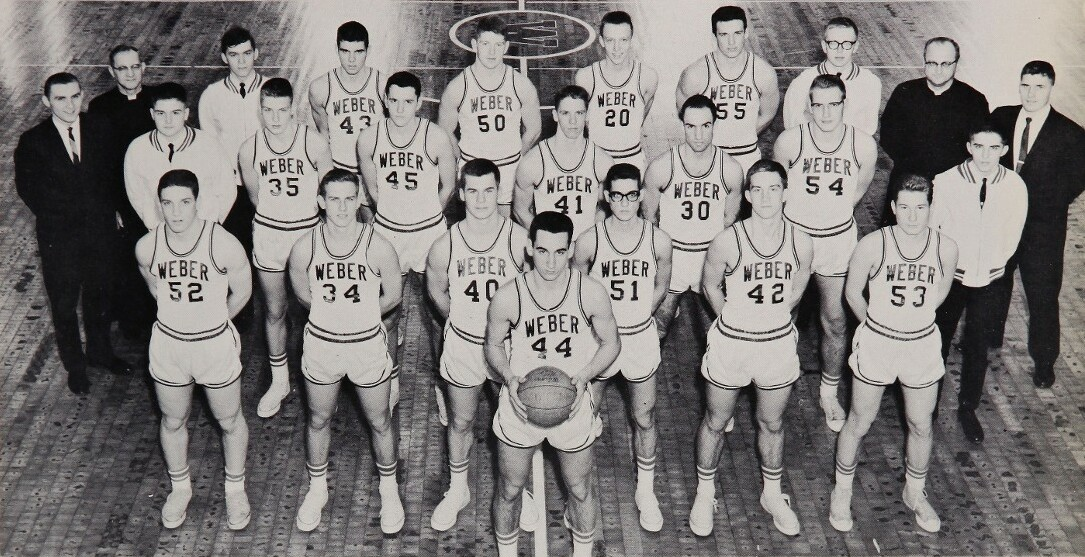
The 1964 Weber High School basketball team in Chicago

High school basketball, also known as prep basketball, is the sport of basketball as played by high school teams in the United States and Canada.

Top high school athletes sometimes go on to play college basketball after graduating. Some players were drafted directly from high school to play professionally in the National Basketball Association, including future NBA stars Kevin Garnett, Kobe Bryant, Tracy McGrady, and LeBron James.

== See also ==
- NBA high school draftees
- One-and-done rule
