= Henry and Alice Gennett House =

Historic house in Indiana, United States

- U.S. National Register of Historic Places
- U.S. Historic district – Contributing property
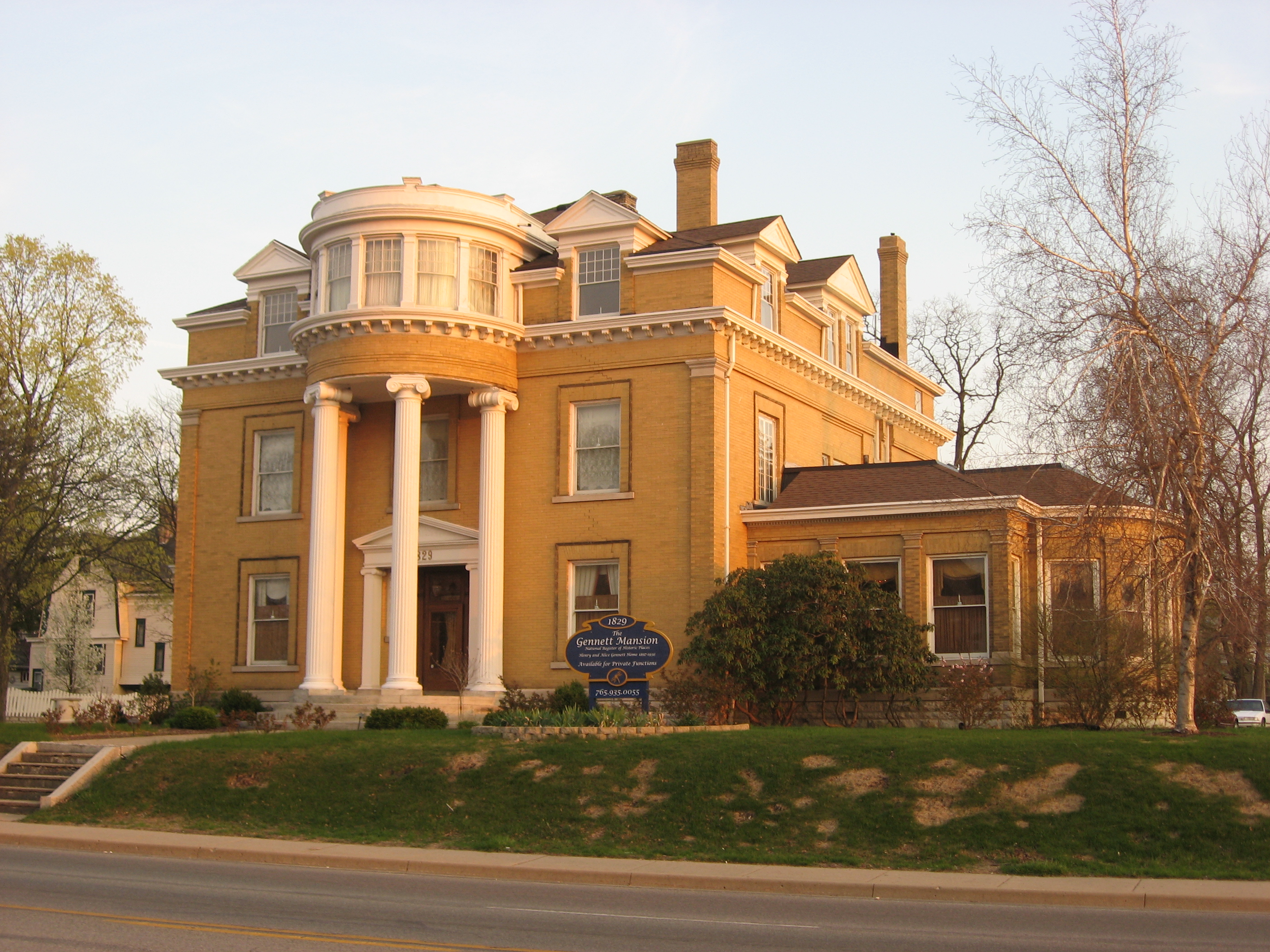
- Henry and Alice Gennett House, April 2011

- Location within Indiana Location within the United States
- Location: 1829 E. Main St., Richmond, Indiana
- Coordinates: 39°49′47″N 84°52′37″W
- Area: 1 acre (0.40 ha)
- Built: 1898
- Architectural style: Colonial Revival
- NRHP reference No.: 83000043
- Added to NRHP: August 11, 1983

Henry and Alice Gennett House, also known as The Gennett Mansion, is a historic home located at Richmond, Indiana. It was built in 1898, and is a large two-story, Colonial Revival style yellow ceramic brick dwelling, with small projecting porches or wings on each side. It sits on a limestone foundation and has a hipped roof. It features a two-story entrance portico with Ionic order columns surmounted by a semi-circular bay.

It was listed on the National Register of Historic Places in 1983. It is located in the East Main Street-Glen Miller Park Historic District.
