= Old Richmond Historic District =

Historic district in Indiana, United States

- U.S. National Register of Historic Places
- U.S. Historic district
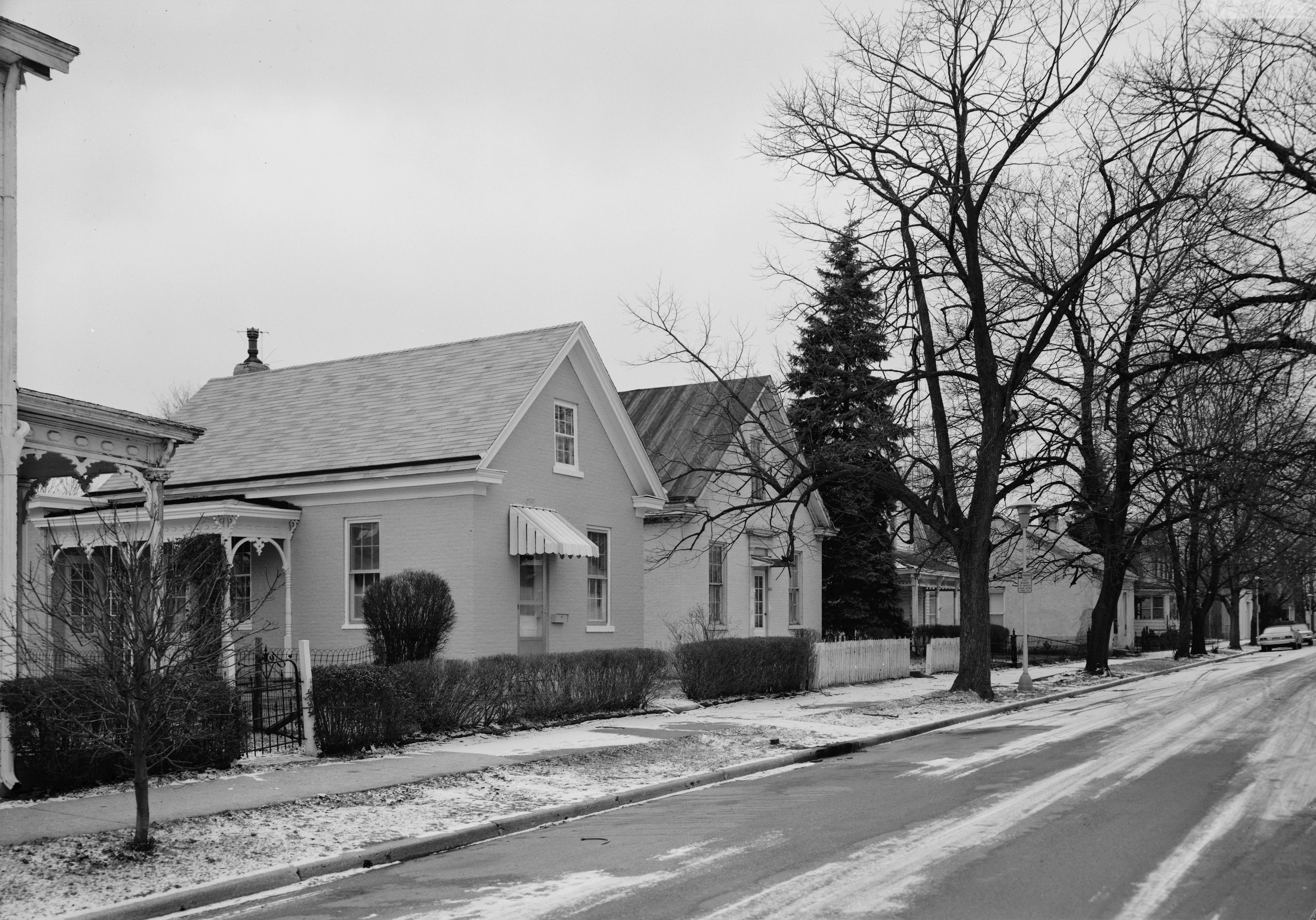
- Houses in the district

- Location within Indiana Location within the United States
- Location: Roughly bounded by the former C&O railroad line, S. 11th, S. A, and the alley south of S. E St. in Richmond, Indiana; also roughly bounded by A, 11th, and E. Sts., and the former C&O railroad tracks
- Coordinates: 39°49′21″N 84°53′32″W
- Area: 250 acres (100 ha)
- Architect: Multiple
- Architectural style: Mixed
- NRHP reference No.: 74000025
- Added to NRHP: June 28, 1974 (original), December 23, 2003 (increase)

The Old Richmond Historic District is a neighborhood of historic residential and commercial buildings and national historic district located at Richmond, Indiana. The district encompasses 212 contributing buildings located just east of the East Fork of the Whitewater River, comprising some of the earliest extant buildings in Richmond. It developed between about 1816 and 1925 and includes representative examples of Greek Revival, Italianate, and Gothic Revival style architecture. Located in the district is the separately listed Bethel A.M.E. Church. Other notable contributing buildings include the William Paul Quinn House (c. 1835), Elijah Coffin House (1845–1847), Henry Davis House (1856), Rankempf Cottage (1855), Hall Town House (1838), Edward Frauman House (1855), and Lydia Pierce Cottage (1858).

The district was added to the National Register of Historic Places in 1974 and expanded in 2003.

== See also ==
- Starr Historic District
- Richmond Railroad Station Historic District
- Reeveston Place Historic District
- East Main Street-Glen Miller Park Historic District
- Richmond Downtown Historic District
