= Reeveston Place Historic District =

Historic district in Indiana, United States

- U.S. National Register of Historic Places
- U.S. Historic district
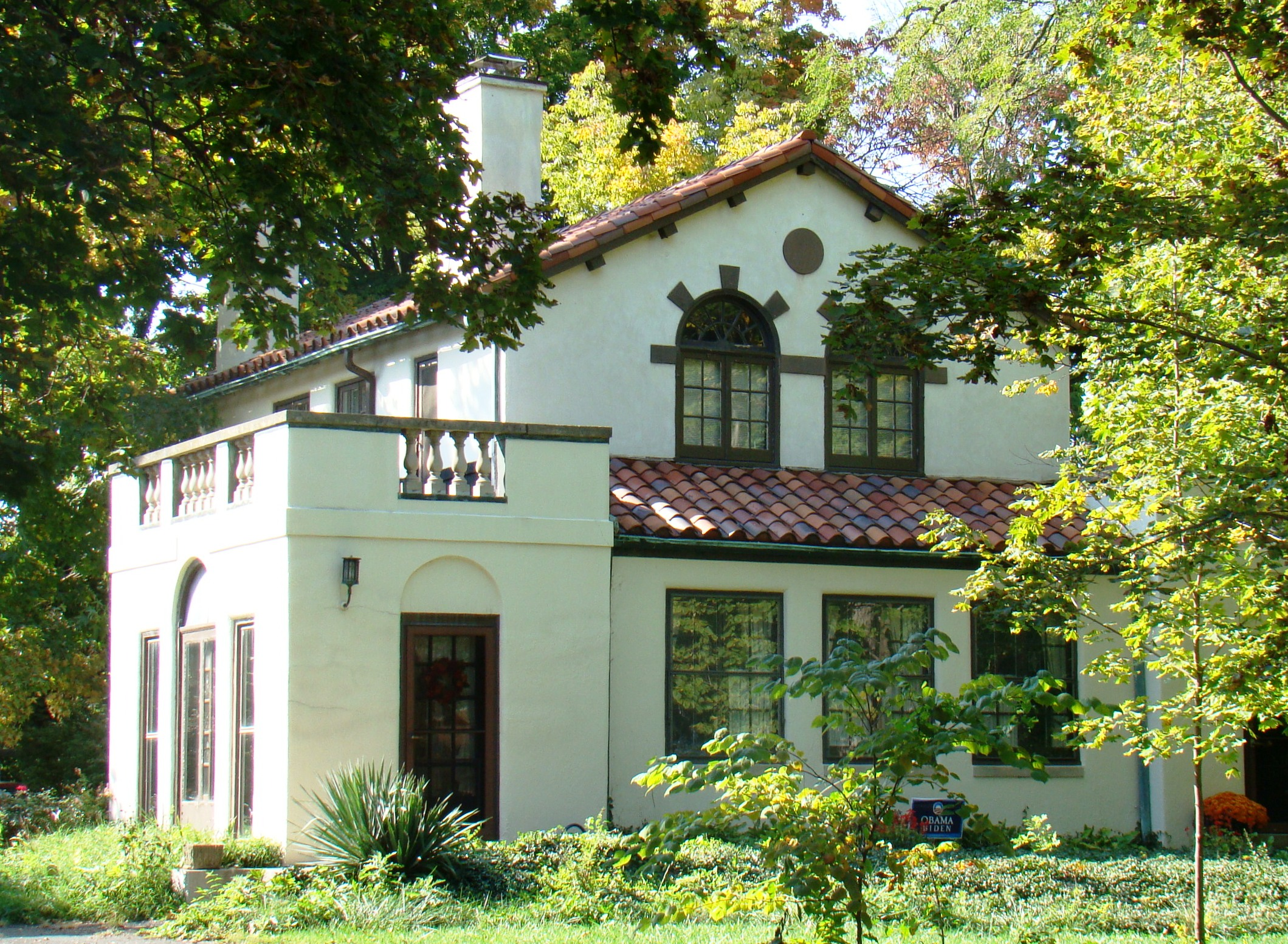

- Location within Indiana Location within the United States
- Location: Bounded by South B, South E, South 16th and South 23rd Sts., Richmond, Indiana
- Coordinates: 39°50′32″N 84°52′31.6″W
- Area: 91 acres (37 ha)
- Architectural style: Craftsman, Georgian, Colonial Revival, Tudor Revival, Art Moderne
- NRHP reference No.: 02001171
- Added to NRHP: January 17, 2003

The Reeveston Place Historic District is a neighborhood of homes and national historic district located at Richmond, Indiana. It was platted in 1911 on land formerly owned by the family of Mark Reeves and the district encompasses 218 contributing buildings, one contributing site, and two contributing objects. The architecture is an eclectic mix of styles including Craftsman and English cottages, and impressive homes in the Colonial Revival, Tudor Revival, Georgian, French, Spanish and Ranch styles. The original Reeves home in the Second Empire style survives as well.

The proper borders of the Reeveston area are South B Street to the north, South 23rd Street to the east, South 16th Street to the west and South E Street to the south. However, the northeast corner of South E and South 16th is not a part of the original Reeves property - the house located there predates the Reeves home.

The district was added to the National Register of Historic Places in 2003.

== See also ==
- Old Richmond Historic District
- Starr Historic District
- Richmond Railroad Station Historic District
- East Main Street-Glen Miller Park Historic District
- Richmond Downtown Historic District
