= Andrew F. Scott House =

Historic house in Indiana, United States

- U.S. National Register of Historic Places
- U.S. Historic district – Contributing property
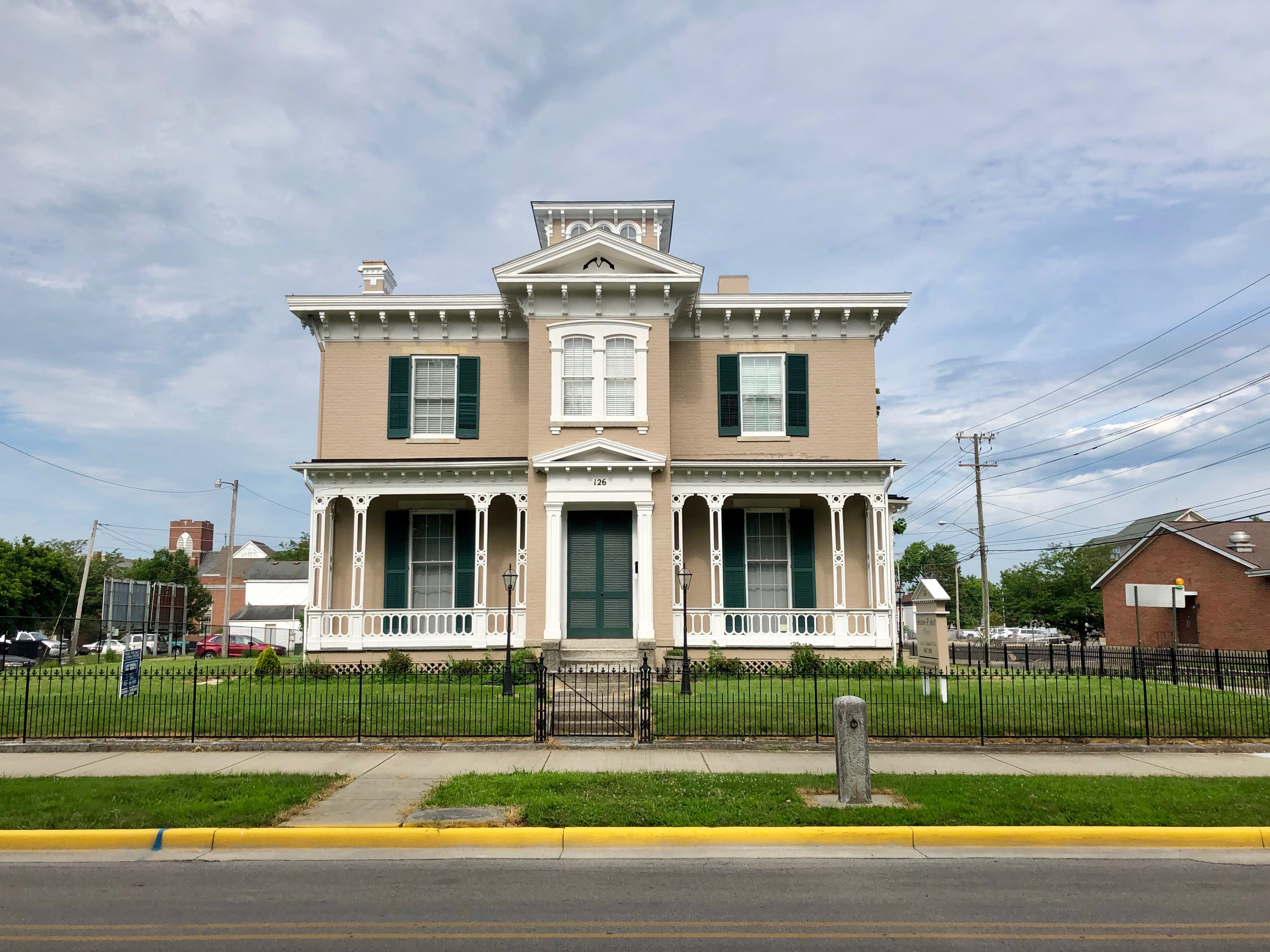
- Andrew F. Scott House, July 2019

- Location within Indiana Location within the United States
- Location: 126 N. 10th St., Richmond, Indiana
- Coordinates: 39°49′53″N 84°53′22″W
- Area: less than one acre
- Built: 1858
- Architectural style: Italianate
- NRHP reference No.: 75000039
- Added to NRHP: October 10, 1975

Andrew F. Scott House is a historic home located at Richmond, Indiana. It was built in 1858, and is a two-story, cubic, Italianate style brick dwelling. It has a hipped roof topped by a cupola and kitchen wing. It features a projecting pedimented central entrance bay flanked by one-story verandas with decorated posts. From 1977 to 2004, it was owned by the Wayne County Historical Museum and operated as a historic house museum.

It was listed on the National Register of Historic Places in 1975. It is located in the Starr Historic District.
