= Knightstone =

Knightstone may refer to:

- Knightstone, Ottery St Mary, England, a manor house
- Knightstone, an island off Weston-super-Mare, England
- Knightstone Comics, publishers of Tekken

== See also ==
- Dana Knightstone, a series of casual hidden object puzzle adventure games
- Knightstown (disambiguation)
