= Starr Historic District =

Historic district in Indiana, United States

- U.S. National Register of Historic Places
- U.S. Historic district
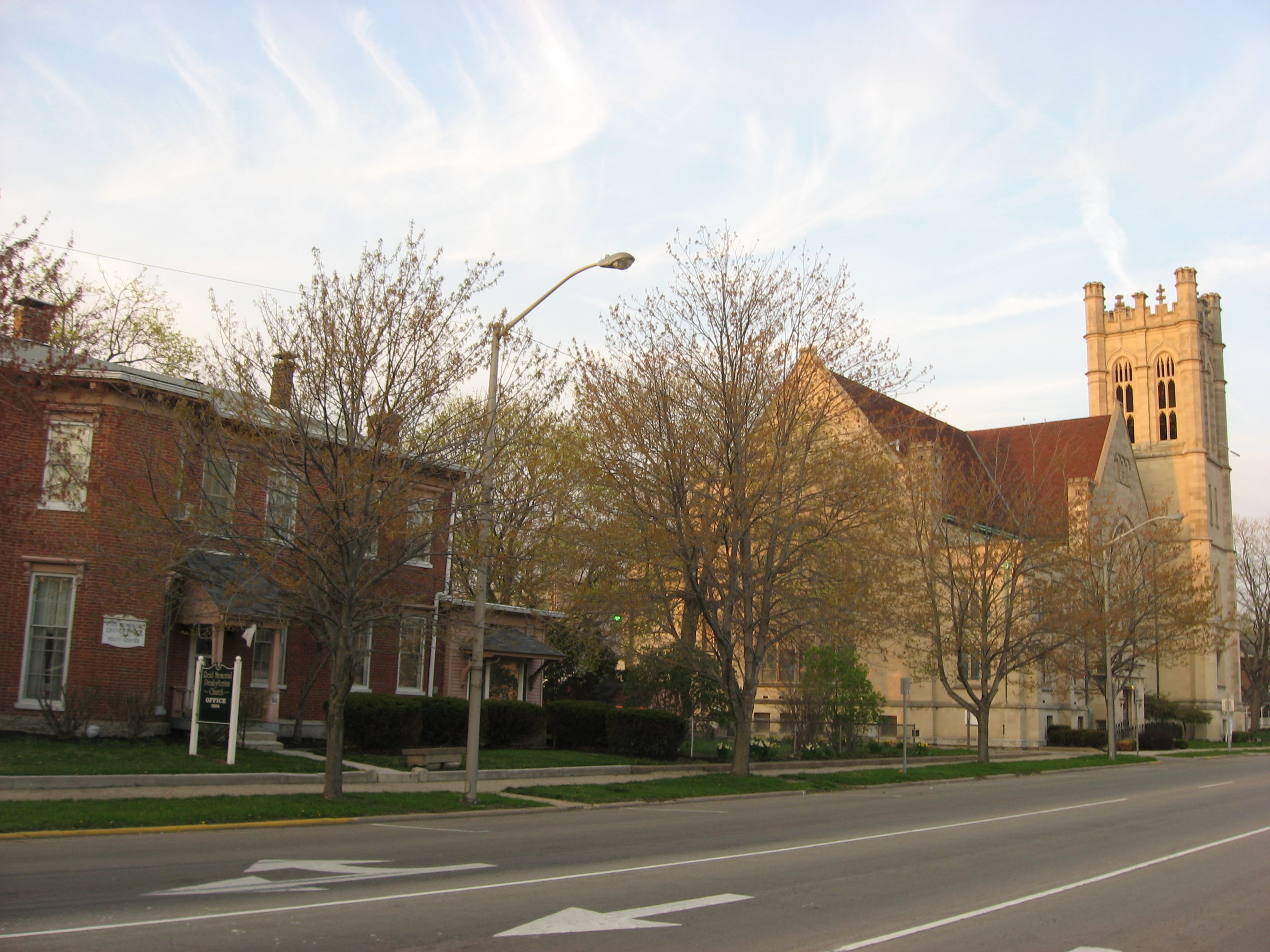
- Buildings in the Starr Historic District

- Location within Indiana Location within the United States
- Location: Roughly bounded by N. 16th, E and A Sts., and alley W of N. 10th St., Richmond, Indiana
- Coordinates: 39°49′57″N 84°53′05″W
- Area: 160 acres (65 ha)
- Architect: Multiple
- Architectural style: Italian Villa, Italianate
- NRHP reference No.: 74000026
- Added to NRHP: June 28, 1974

The Starr Historic District is a neighborhood of historic buildings and national historic district located at Richmond, Indiana. The district encompasses 102 contributing buildings in a predominantly residential section of Richmond. It developed between about 1853 and 1915 and includes representative examples of Greek Revival, Italianate, Second Empire, and Queen Anne style architecture. Included in the district is a former Hicksite Quaker Meeting House, now the Wayne County Historical Museum and the Reid Memorial Presbyterian Church and Andrew F. Scott House. Other notable buildings include the Miller-Mendenhall House (1875), Dickinson Log House (1825), Starr-Cadwalader House (1861), and Clem Gaar House (1883).

Two houses in the District were the former residences of Orville and Wilbur Wright, during their childhood. A long-gone garage at the back of one of these houses was the location of their first bicycle repair 'shop'. This info was reprinted from a Richmond Palladium-Item article.

The district was added to the National Register of Historic Places in 1974.

== See also ==
- Old Richmond Historic District
- Richmond Railroad Station Historic District
- Reeveston Place Historic District
- East Main Street-Glen Miller Park Historic District
- Richmond Downtown Historic District
