= Richmond station (Pennsylvania Railroad) =

Historic district in Indiana, United States

Richmond, IN
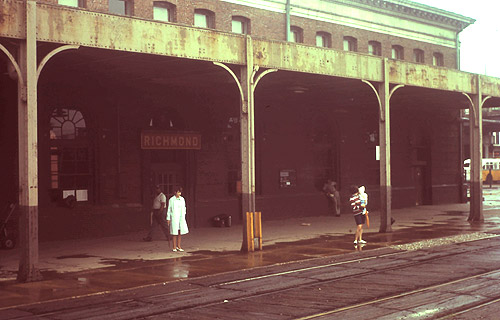
- The station in period use by the Penn Central, in May 1970

General information
- Location: Tenth and North E Streets, Richmond, Indiana

History
- Opened: 1902
- Closed: October 1, 1979

Former services
Preceding station	Amtrak	Following station
Indianapolis toward Kansas City	National Limited	Dayton toward New York or Washington, D.C.
Preceding station	Pennsylvania Railroad	Following station
Hagerstown toward Chicago	Chicago – Cincinnati	Eaton toward Cincinnati
Centerville toward St. Louis	St. Louis – Pittsburgh	New Paris via Piqua toward Pittsburgh
Centerville toward St. Louis	St. Louis – Pittsburgh	Dayton via Dayton toward Pittsburgh
Fountain City toward Mackinaw City	Grand Rapids & Indiana Railway	Terminus
- Richmond Railroad Station Historic District
- U.S. National Register of Historic Places
- U.S. Historic district
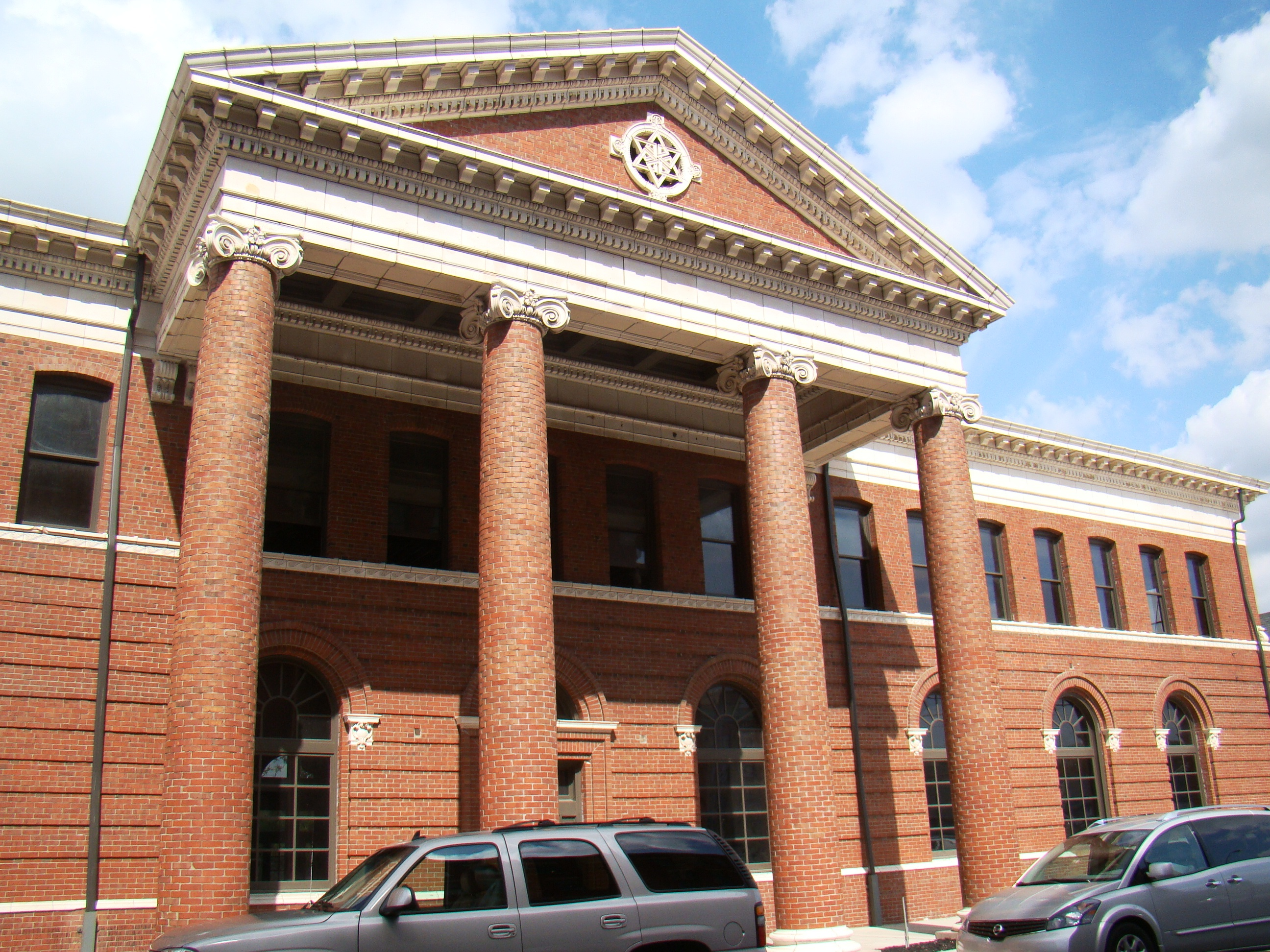
- The former Pennsylvania Railroad station in Richmond.

- Location within Indiana Location within the United States
- Location: Roughly bounded by Norfolk & Southern RR tracks, N. Tenth St., Elm Pl., N. D St., & Ft. Wayne Ave., Richmond, Indiana
- Coordinates: 39°50′3″N 84°53′26″W
- Area: 11 acres (4.5 ha)
- Architect: Multiple
- Architectural style: Italianate, Classical Revival, etc.
- NRHP reference No.: 87001808
- Added to NRHP: October 8, 1987
Location

Richmond station is a former railroad station of the Pittsburgh, Fort Wayne and Chicago Railway and Pennsylvania Railroad. The former station is located within a national historic district located at Richmond, Indiana.

== Services on the Fort Wayne Line ==
Richmond station hosted trains on north–south and east–west trajectories through eastern Indiana:

- Amtrak:
  - National Limited - Kansas City–New York, New York
- Pennsylvania Railroad:
  - American - St. Louis–New York, New York
  - Buckeye - Chicago–Cincinnati, Ohio
  - Indianapolis Limited - Indianapolis–New York, New York
  - Northern Arrow - Mackinaw City–Cincinnati, Ohio, with sleeping car sections moved onto connecting trains to St. Louis
  - Penn Texas - St. Louis–New York, New York
  - Southland - Chicago–St. Petersburg, Florida/Sarasota, Florida/Miami, Florida
  - Spirit of St. Louis - St. Louis–New York, New York
  - St. Louisan - St. Louis–New York, New York
  - Union - Chicago–Cincinnati, Ohio, and a section to Columbus via Dayton

A previous station at this same location was also a stop on the procession of Abraham Lincoln's funeral train. Indiana Governor Oliver P. Morton boarded the train at this stop, and rode it to Indianapolis, where a procession and showing were held.

== Historic district ==
The Richmond Railroad Station Historic District encompasses 22 contributing buildings the icon of which is the Daniel Burnham-designed Pennsylvania Railroad Station, completed in 1902. It developed between about 1853 and 1915 and includes representative examples of Italianate, Classical Revival, and Chicago School style architecture. In addition to the Pennsylvania Railroad Station, other notable buildings include the Miller Brothers Block (1890), Jacob H. Lichtenfels Building (1890), Charles Sudhoff Building (1893), Benjamin Starr Building (1896), William H. Alford Building (1905), John Roberts Building (1877), R.F.D. Hose House No. 1 (1890), James Shaw Building (1875), and Richmond / Atlas Underwear Building (1910).

The district was added to the National Register of Historic Places in 1987 and is also a local conservation district designated by the City of Richmond's Historic Preservation Commission.

== See also ==
- Old Richmond Historic District
- Starr Historic District
- Reeveston Place Historic District
- East Main Street-Glen Miller Park Historic District
- Richmond Downtown Historic District
