= Elias Hinshaw House =

Historic house in Indiana, United States

- U.S. National Register of Historic Places
- U.S. Historic district – Contributing property
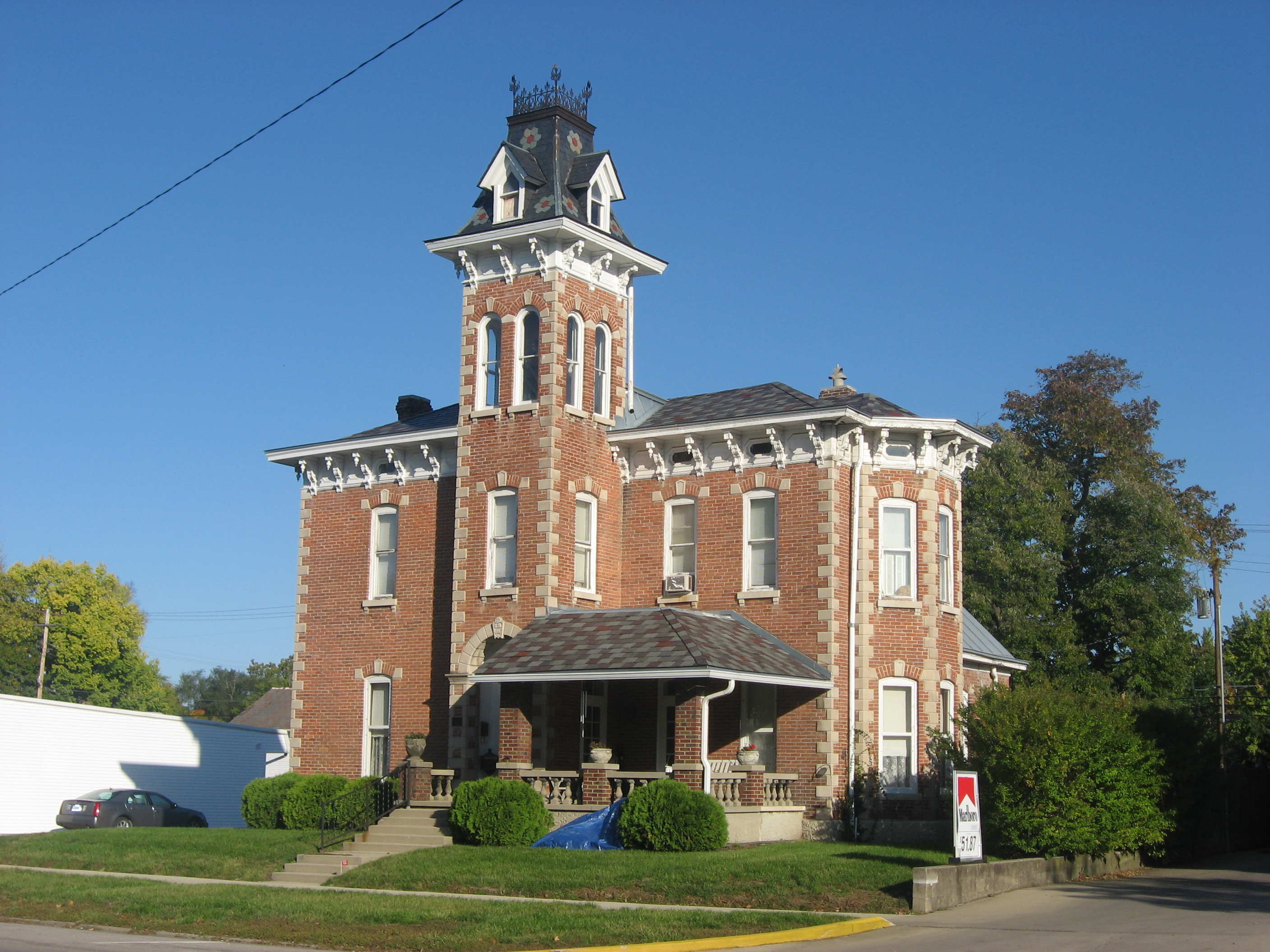
- Front of the house

- Location within Indiana Location within the United States
- Location: 16 W. Main St., Knightstown, Indiana
- Coordinates: 39°47′43″N 85°31′42″W
- Area: Less than 1 acre (0.40 ha)
- Built: 1883
- Architectural style: Second Empire
- NRHP reference No.: 84001045
- Added to NRHP: May 3, 1984

The Elias Hinshaw House is a historic home located at 16 West Main Street (US 40) in Knightstown, Indiana. The house is built in Italian Villa style and was constructed in 1883. The main feature of the house is a four-story central tower. The house is of two-story brick construction on a raised basement.

It was added to the National Register of Historic Places in 1984. The Elias Hinshaw House is located in the Knightstown Historic District.
