= Knightstown Historic District =

Historic district in Indiana, United States

- U.S. National Register of Historic Places
- U.S. Historic district
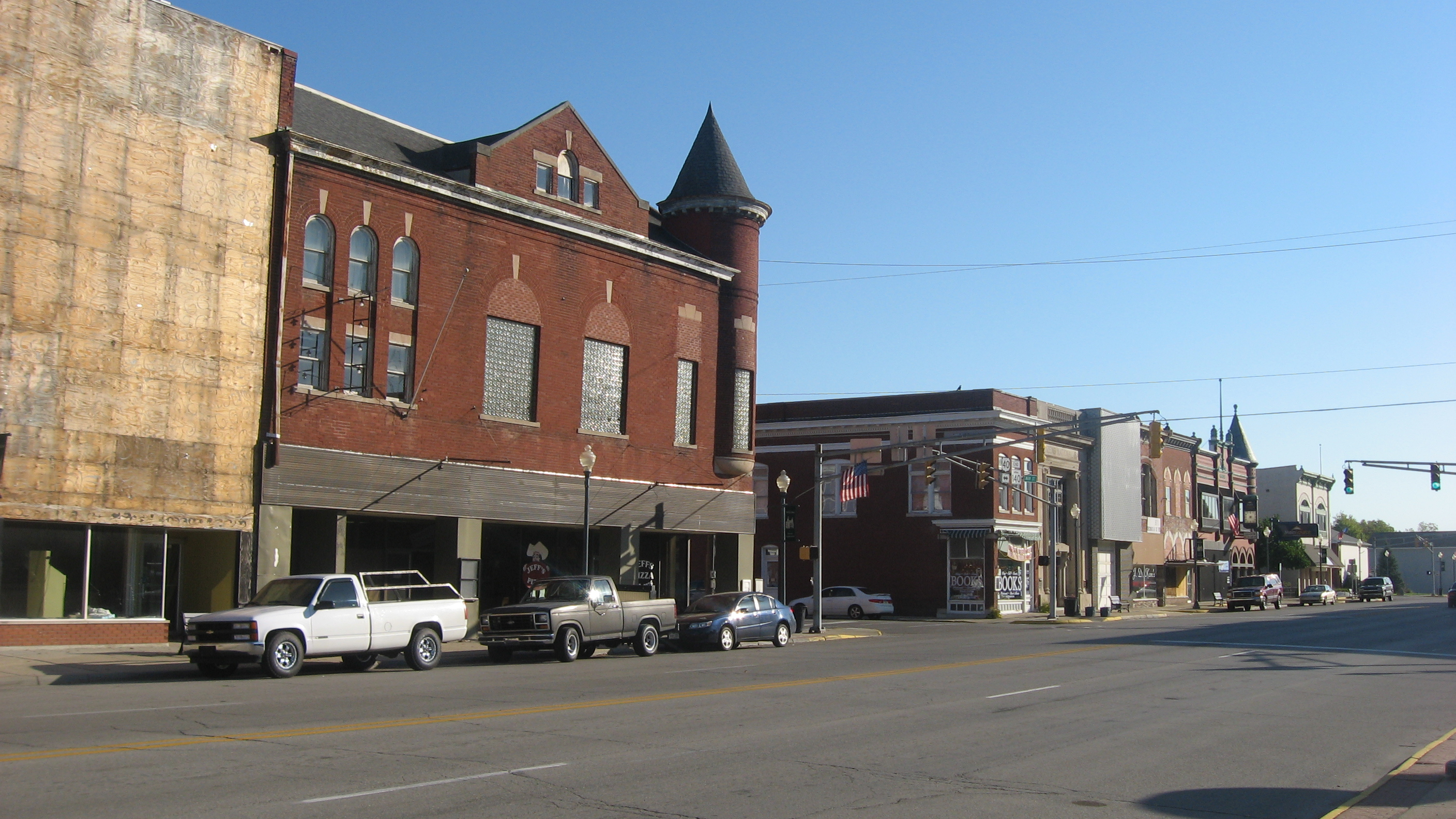
- Main Street in the district

- Location within Indiana Location within the United States
- Location: Roughly bounded by Morgan, Adams, Third, and McCullum Sts., Knightstown, Indiana
- Coordinates: 39°47′28″N 85°31′42″W
- Area: 224.6 acres (90.9 ha)
- Architectural style: Italianate, Greek Revival, Gothic Revival
- NRHP reference No.: 86001104
- Added to NRHP: May 22, 1986

The Knightstown Historic District is national historic district located at Knightstown, Indiana. It is roughly bounded by Morgan, Adams, Third, and McCullum Streets and encompasses 536 contributing buildings. It developed between about the 1830s and 1936, and includes many excellent examples of Italianate, Greek Revival, and Gothic Revival styles of architecture. Notable sites of interest include the Knightstown Academy, Elias Hinshaw House, and the Knightstown Public Square. Other notable buildings include the Friends Church (1874–1875), Bethel Presbyterian Church (1885), Christian Church (1882), IOOF Building (1897–1898), Masonic Hall (1900–1901), Lehmanowsky House (c. 1844–1850), Morgan Building (1866–1867), Old Town Hall (1892), Knightstown Public Library (1912), and U.S. Post Office (1936).

It was added to the National Register of Historic Places in 1986.
