= John A. Hasecoster =

German born American architect (1844–1925)

- Born: 1844; Osnabrück, Germany
- Died: 1925 (aged 80–81)
- Occupation: Architect

John Adam Hasecoster (1844–1925) was an American architect in Indiana. His practice was located in Richmond, Indiana. He designed public buildings as well as residences in the area, some of which have been listed on the National Register of Historic Places.

== Early life and education ==
Hasecoster was born in Osnabrück, Germany, where his father was a master builder. After having studied drafting at Nienburg, Hasecoster emigrated to the United States in 1867. He joined two older brothers George and Frederick in Richmond, Indiana, where a number of Germans from the Osnabrück area had settled in the middle 19th Century.

He completed his architecture study in St. Louis, Missouri, and Chicago and returned to Richmond in 1875 after a five-year apprenticeship.

== Career ==
Hasecoster designed buildings in many European and American styles, including Second Empire, Romanesque, Gothic Revival, and Craftsman.

=== Notable works ===
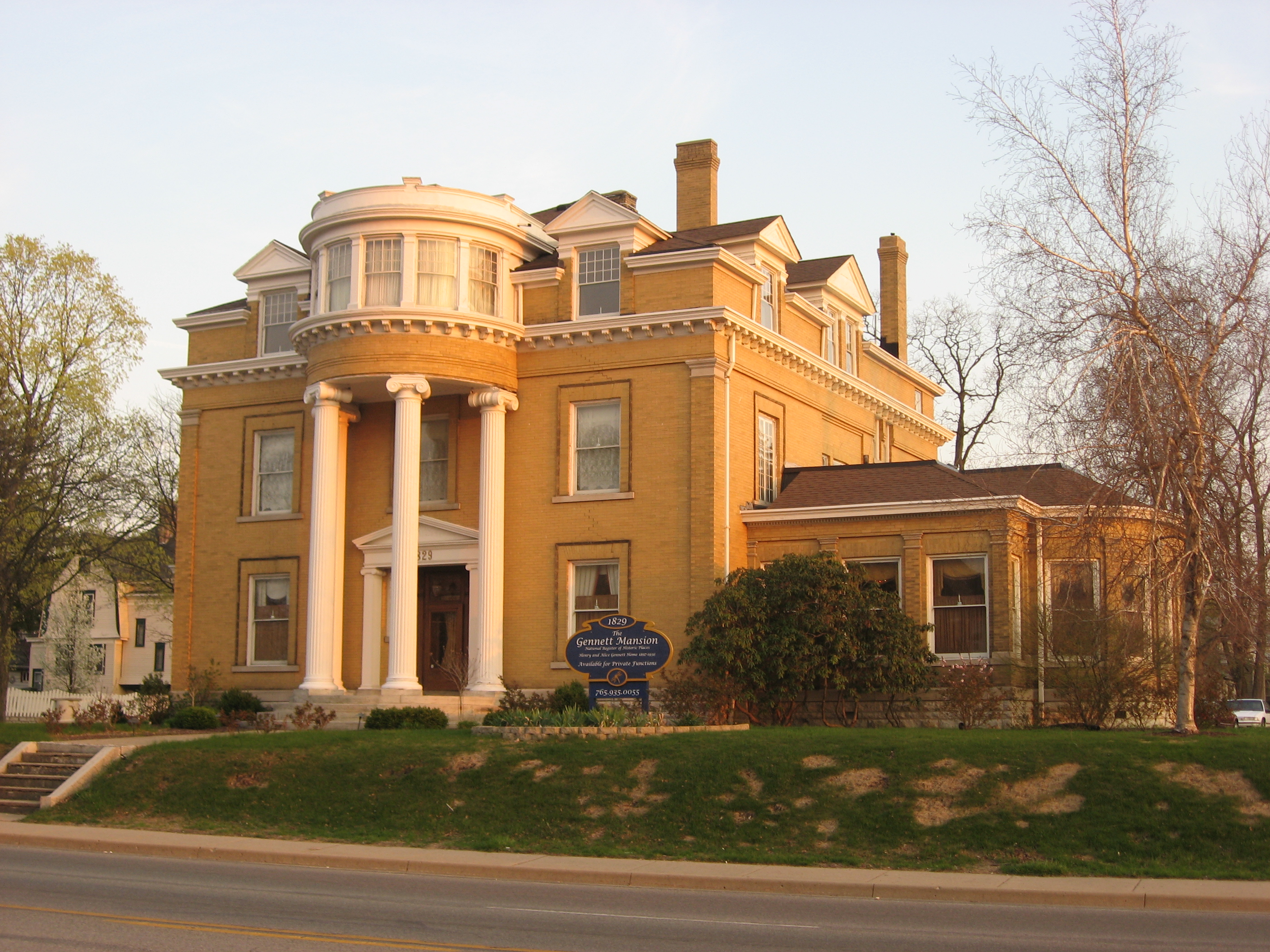
Henry and Alice Gennett Home

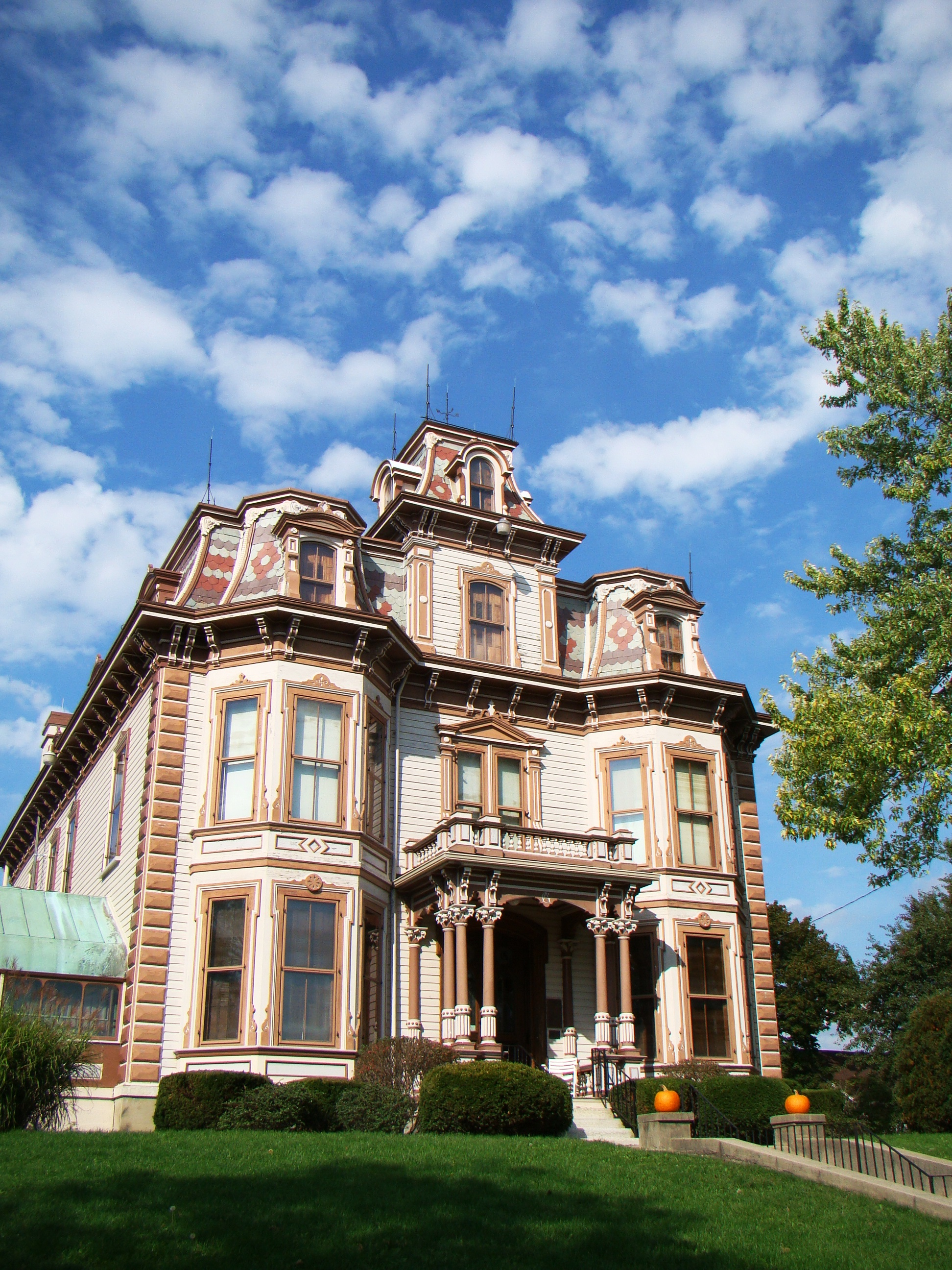
Abram and Agnes Gaar House

- Abram Gaar House and Farm, 1876, Richmond, Indiana (National Register of Historic Places)
- Franklin County, Indiana Courthouse, 1877 remodeling, Brookville, Indiana
- Knightstown Academy, 1876, Knightstown, Indiana (National Register of Historic Places)
- Wernle Children's Home, 1893, Richmond, Indiana
- Reid Memorial Hospital, 1904, Richmond, Indiana
- Lincoln Hall, Indiana Soldiers' and Sailors' Children's Home, 1891, Knightstown, Indiana (National Register of Historic Places)
- Administration Building, Indiana Soldiers' and Sailors' Children's Home, 1888, Knightstown, Indiana (National Register of Historic Places)
- Gaar-Scott & Company Office (now Richmond Baking offices), Richmond, Indiana
- St. John's Lutheran Church, 1908, Richmond, Indiana
- Henry and Alice Gennett residence, 1897, Richmond, Indiana (National Register of Historic Places)
- David Worth Dennis residence, Richmond, Indiana
- Wayne Flats (now Bradford Place), 1903, Richmond, Indiana

== Sources ==
- Tomlan, Mary Raddant and Michael A. Richmond, Indiana: Its Physical and Aesthetic Heritage to 1920, Indianapolis: Indiana Historical Society, 2003
- Royer, Donald M. The German-American Contribution to Richmond's Development, Vol. II, Richmond, Indiana: The Richmond German Heritage Society, 1993
