= Knightstown Academy =

- U.S. National Register of Historic Places
- U.S. Historic district – Contributing property
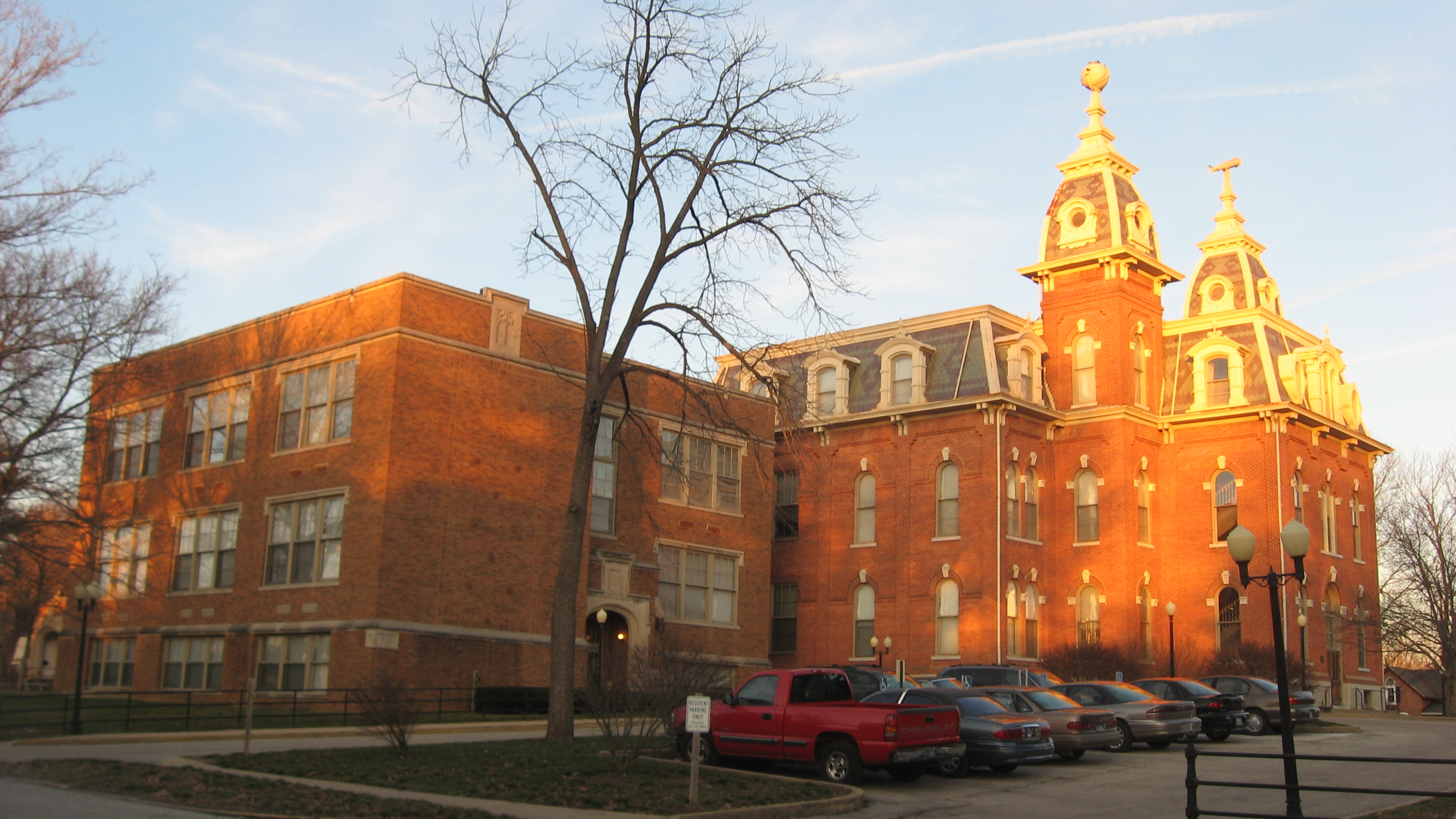
- Front of the building

- Location within Indiana Location within the United States
- Location: Carey St., Knightstown, Indiana
- Coordinates: 39°48′0″N 85°31′29″W
- Area: Less than 1 acre (0.40 ha)
- Built: 1876
- Architect: John A. Hasecoster
- Architectural style: Second Empire
- NRHP reference No.: 76000022
- Added to NRHP: September 29, 1976

The Knightstown Academy is a historic school building located at Knightstown, Indiana. It was built as a Quaker Academy in 1876 and affiliated with the Society of Friends. The building is located north of the National Road (US 40) on Cary at Washington Street. The building was designed in Second Empire style. It has a mansard roof and twin four story towers that are topped by a telescope and a globe. After the building ceased to be used as an academy, it functioned for many years as the local public high school. It is now an apartment building. The attached gymnasium was used as the home court of the Hickory Huskers in the 1985 movie Hoosiers.

It was added to the National Register of Historic Places in 1976. It is located in Knightstown Historic District.
