= Charles A. Beard Memorial School Corporation =

School district in Indiana, United States

Location
- Knightstown, Indiana United States of America

District information
- Type: Public
- Grades: K-12
- Established: 1963
- Superintendent: Jediah Behny

Students and staff
- Students: 1,077
- Teachers: 76
- Staff: 178
- Athletic conference: Tri-Eastern Conference (IHSAA)
- Colors: Black and Red

Other information
- Address: 8139 W. US 40, Knightstown, 46148
- Website: Official website

The Charles A. Beard Memorial School Corporation, named after historian Charles A. Beard, is a public school corporation located in southwestern Henry County, Indiana and serving Knightstown and surrounding areas. The district was formed in 1963 through the consolidation of schools in Wayne and Greensboro townships. Ripley Township, in neighboring Rush County, would later be added.

== Schools ==
=== Secondary ===
- Knightstown High School (9–12)
- Knightstown Intermediate School (4–8)

=== Elementary ===
- Knightstown Elementary School (K-3)
