= Knightstown, Indiana =

- Town
- Town of Knightstown
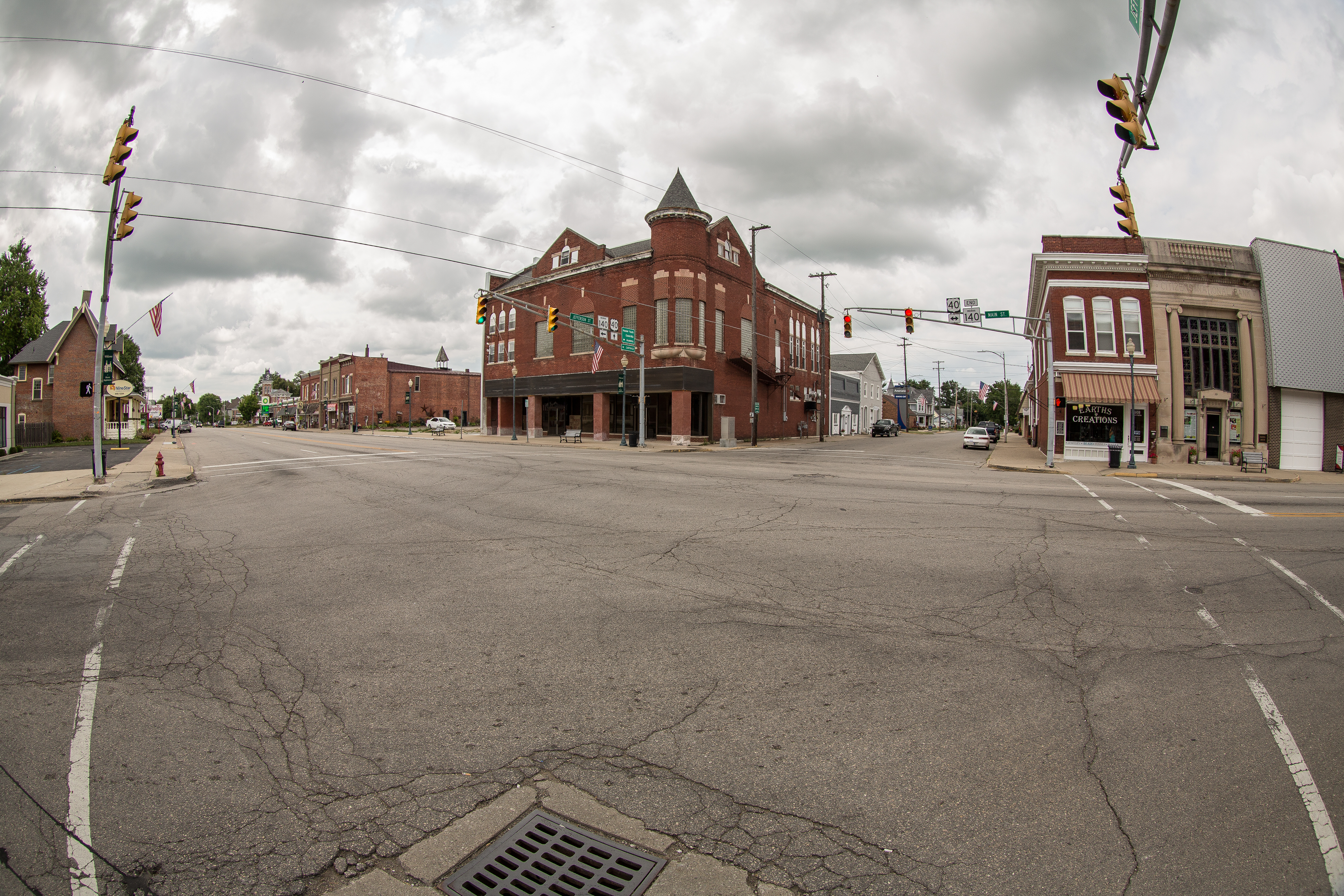

- Location of Knightstown in Henry County, Indiana.
- Coordinates: 39°47′45″N 85°31′52″W
- Country: United States
- State: Indiana
- County: Henry
- Township: Wayne
- Founded: 1827
- Incorporated: 1827
- Founder: Waitsell M. Cary
- Named for: Jonathan Knight

Area
  - Total: 1.04 sq mi (2.69 km^{2})
  - Land: 1.03 sq mi (2.67 km^{2})
  - Water: 0.0077 sq mi (0.02 km^{2})
- Elevation: 929 ft (283 m)

Population (2020)
  - Total: 2,140
  - Estimate (2025): 2,166 ▲
  - Density: 2,078.5/sq mi (802.52/km^{2})
- Time zone: UTC-5 (EST)
  - Summer (DST): UTC-4 (EDT)
- ZIP code: 46148
- Area code: 765
- FIPS code: 18-40266
- GNIS feature ID: 2396694
- Website: www.knightstown.in

Knightstown is a town in Wayne Township, Henry County, Indiana, adjacent to Rush County, along the Big Blue River. The population was 2,140 at the 2020 census. It is approximately thirty-two miles east of Indianapolis.

Knightstown was used in the 1986 film Hoosiers. The Hoosier Gym was used in the filming of the film. Knightstown hosts two annual festivals: Jubilee Days held in early-mid June and The Hoosier Fall Festival held in September. Knightstown also hosts an annual car show and a music series on the town square.

== History ==
Knightstown was founded and platted by Waitsell M. Cary in 1827, the same year Knightstown was incorporated. It was named for Jonathan Knight, an engineer on the National Road and U.S. Congressman from Pennsylvania. A post office has operated in Knightstown since 1833.

The Elias Hinshaw House, Knightstown Academy, and Knightstown Historic District are listed on the National Register of Historic Places.

== Geography ==
According to the 2010 census, Knightstown has a total area of 1.04 square miles (2.69 km^{2}), of which 1.03 square miles (2.67 km^{2}) (or 99.04%) is land and 0.01 square miles (0.03 km^{2}) (or 0.96%) is water.

== Demographics ==
Historical population
Census	Pop.	Note	%±
1870	1,528		—
1880	1,670		9.3%
1890	1,867		11.8%
1900	1,942		4.0%
1910	2,008		3.4%
1920	1,918		−4.5%
1930	2,209		15.2%
1940	2,323		5.2%
1950	2,486		7.0%
1960	2,496		0.4%
1970	2,456		−1.6%
1980	2,325		−5.3%
1990	2,048		−11.9%
2000	2,148		4.9%
2010	2,182		1.6%
2020	2,140		−1.9%
2025 (est.)	2,166		1.2%
U.S. Decennial Census

=== 2020 census ===
As of the 2020 census, Knightstown had a population of 2,140. The median age was 38.5 years. 23.9% of residents were under the age of 18 and 17.6% of residents were 65 years of age or older. For every 100 females there were 98.3 males, and for every 100 females age 18 and over there were 92.0 males age 18 and over.

0.0% of residents lived in urban areas, while 100.0% lived in rural areas.

There were 903 households in Knightstown, of which 29.8% had children under the age of 18 living in them. Of all households, 40.3% were married-couple households, 18.9% were households with a male householder and no spouse or partner present, and 32.0% were households with a female householder and no spouse or partner present. About 31.7% of all households were made up of individuals and 13.0% had someone living alone who was 65 years of age or older.

There were 1,015 housing units, of which 11.0% were vacant. The homeowner vacancy rate was 3.9% and the rental vacancy rate was 10.4%.

Racial composition as of the 2020 census
Race	Number	Percent
White	2,042	95.4%
Black or African American	17	0.8%
American Indian and Alaska Native	4	0.2%
Asian	10	0.5%
Native Hawaiian and Other Pacific Islander	0	0.0%
Some other race	9	0.4%
Two or more races	58	2.7%
Hispanic or Latino (of any race)	25	1.2%

=== 2010 census ===
As of the census of 2010, there were 2,182 people, 899 households, and 590 families living in the town. The population density was 2,118.4 inhabitants per square mile (817.9/km^{2}). There were 1,001 housing units at an average density of 971.8 per square mile (375.2/km^{2}). The racial makeup of the town was 98.0% White, 0.1% African American, 0.1% Native American, 0.1% Asian, 0.1% Pacific Islander, 0.4% from other races, and 1.1% from two or more races. Hispanic or Latino of any race were 0.6% of the population.

There were 899 households, of which 34.5% had children under the age of 18 living with them, 47.1% were married couples living together, 13.6% had a female householder with no husband present, 5.0% had a male householder with no wife present, and 34.4% were non-families. 28.8% of all households were made up of individuals, and 13.5% had someone living alone who was 65 years of age or older. The average household size was 2.43 and the average family size was 3.00.

The median age in the town was 38.8 years. 25.4% of residents were under the age of 18; 9.2% were between the ages of 18 and 24; 24.1% were from 25 to 44; 25.3% were from 45 to 64; and 16% were 65 years of age or older. The gender makeup of the town was 47.8% male and 52.2% female.

=== 2000 census ===
As of the census of 2000, there were 2,148 people, 915 households, and 595 families living in the town. The population density was 3,026.2 inhabitants per square mile (1,168.4/km^{2}). There were 979 housing units at an average density of 1,379.2 per square mile (532.5/km^{2}). The racial makeup of the town was 99.02% White, 0.42% African American, 0.09% Native American, 0.09% Asian, and 0.37% from two or more races. Hispanic or Latino of any race were 0.23% of the population.

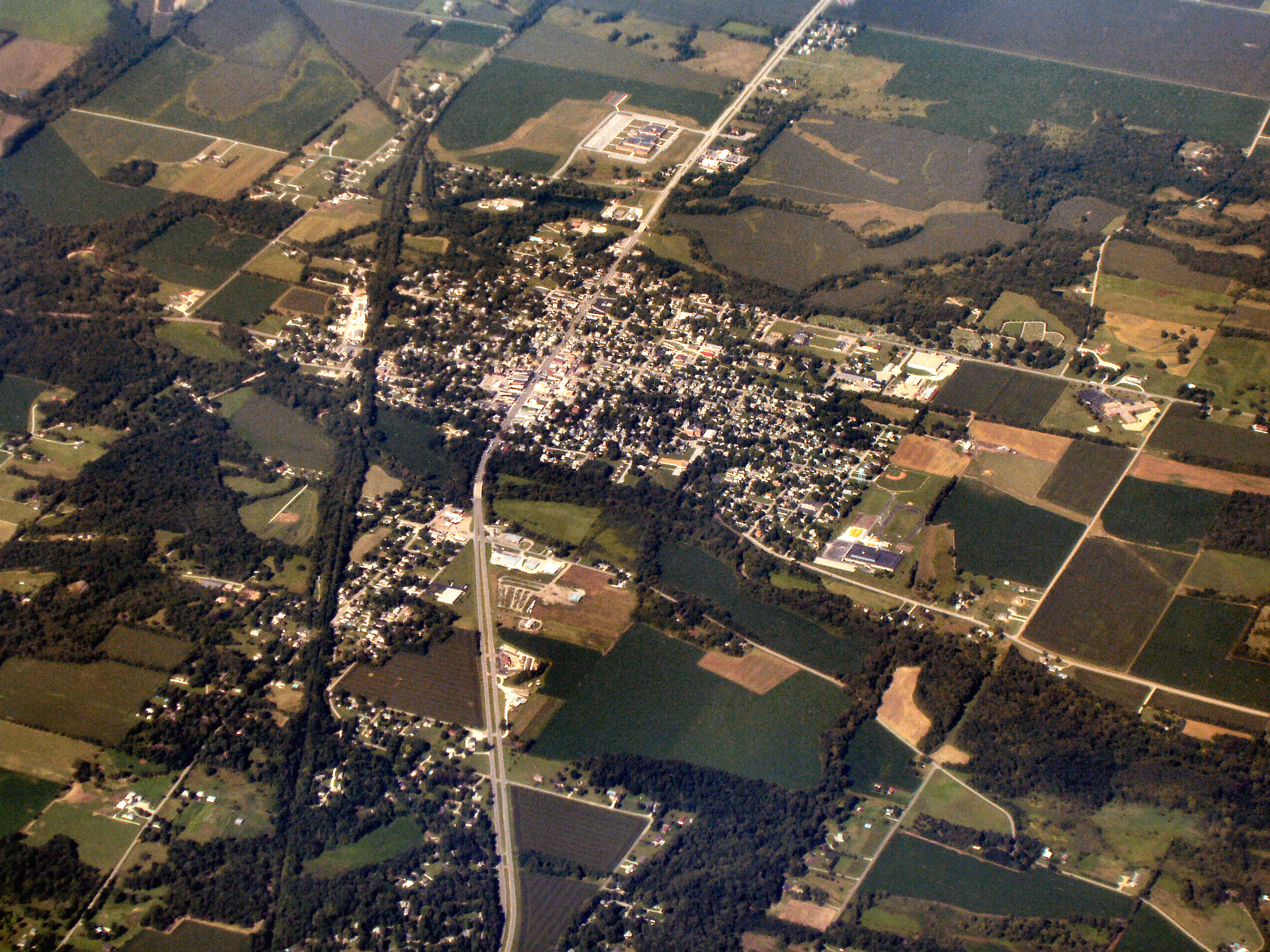
Knightstown, Indiana from the air, looking southwest.

There were 915 households, out of which 31.3% had children under the age of 18 living with them, 50.9% were married couples living together, 10.4% had a female householder with no husband present, and 34.9% were non-families. 31.4% of all households were made up of individuals, and 16.4% had someone living alone who was 65 years of age or older. The average household size was 2.35 and the average family size was 2.93.

In the town, the population was spread out, with 25.7% under the age of 18, 7.1% from 18 to 24, 27.7% from 25 to 44, 22.2% from 45 to 64, and 17.3% who were 65 years of age or older. The median age was 37 years. For every 100 females, there were 85.0 males. For every 100 females age 18 and over, there were 82.1 males.

The median income for a household in the town was $35,639, and the median income for a family was $42,222. Males had a median income of $36,081 versus $22,111 for females. The per capita income for the town was $22,466. About 7.0% of families and 7.1% of the population were below the poverty line, including 8.6% of those under age 18 and 4.1% of those age 65 or over.

== Education ==
Knightstown is served by the Charles A. Beard Memorial School Corporation. Knightstown High School offers AP and ACP (Advanced College Project) credits. High School Cheerleaders won the State Championship in 2000, 2004, 2005, 2012, 2013, 2014, 2015, 2016 and 2018. Knightstown also has an elementary school and an intermediate school.

The town has a lending library, the Knightstown Public Library.

== Notable people ==
- Actor Monte Blue grew up and was educated at the Indiana Soldiers' and Sailors' Children's Home located south of Knightstown.
- Former three-time NFL All-Pro running back/kick returner, actor, and singer Timmy Brown was raised in Knightstown.
- Astronomer John Charles Duncan (1882–1967), noted for his investigation of the Crab Nebula, was born and raised in Knightstown.
- Former Secretary of Agriculture (1969–1971) Clifford M. Hardin and historian Charles A. Beard grew up and attended school in Knightstown.
- Character actor Forrest Lewis was born in Knightstown. He is best known for the recurring role of Officer Kelly in the films The Shaggy Dog, The Absent-Minded Professor, and Son of Flubber.
- Justice of the Indiana Supreme Court Douglas J. Morris was born and raised in Knightstown, graduating from Knightstown High School.
- Ruby Green Smith (1878–1960) entomologist, peace campaigner and home economics educator.
- U.S. Marine Private William Zion was born in Knightstown. He received the Medal of Honor during the China Relief Expedition.

== Recreation ==
- The gym that served as the home court for the Hickory Huskers in the movie Hoosiers is located in Knightstown. It is now known as the Hoosier Gym. It serves as a community center and has a small museum. The gym and museum are open daily to the public free of charge.
- Knightstown also has a public golf course named Royal Hylands, which in 2006 was named among the top 25 public golf courses in the state by the Indiana Golf Association tournament players.
