= List of compositions by Paul Juon =

This is a sortable list of compositions by Paul Juon, categorized by genre, opus number, date of composition (or publication) and title.

Juon's works are largely published by Robert Lienau, Verlag von F.E.C. Leuckart, Musikverlag Zimmermann, Hug Musikverlage and Carl Fischer Music

Genre	Opus	Date	Original title (German title)	English title	Scoring	Notes
Piano		1894	Zwiegespräch	Dialogue	for piano	
Piano	1	1898	6 Skizzen: 1. Elegie; 2. Notturno; 3. Canzonetta; 4. Duettino; 5. Berceuse; 6. Petite valse	6 Sketches	for piano	
Vocal	2	1895	2 schlichte Lieder: 1. Das verlaßene Mägdlein; 2. Das Mädchen	2 Simple Songs	for voice and piano	1. words by Eduard Mörike; 2. words by Joseph Freiherr von Eichendorff
Vocal	3	1895	Margits Lied	Margit's Song	for voice and piano	words from The Feast at Solhaug by Henrik Ibsen; unpublished
Orchestral	3a	1894	Ingeborgs Klage	Ingeborg's Plea	for orchestra	unpublished
Chamber music	4	c.1895	Violoncellosonate Nr. 1	Sonata No. 1	for cello and piano	
Chamber music	5	1896	Streichquartett Nr. 1 D-Dur	String Quartet No. 1 in D major	for 2 violins, viola and cello	in 5 movements
Stage		1896	Aleko, Oper	Aleko, Opera		
Vocal	6		Mörtelweib's Tochter, Ballade		for voice and piano	words from Simplicissimus published 1907
Chamber music	7	1898	Violinsonate Nr. 1 A-Dur	Sonata No. 1 in A major	for violin and piano	
Chamber music	7	1898, 1899	Romanze aus der Violinsonate	Romance	for viola (or cello) and piano	composer's adaptation from movement II of the Violin Sonata, Op. 7
Chamber music	8	1904	Märchen a-Moll	Fairy Tale in A minor	for cello and piano	dedicated to luthier Otto Möckel (1869–1937)
Chamber music	9	1899	Silhouettes, 1^{re} Série: 1. Idylle; 2. Douleur; 3. Bizarrerie; 4. Conte mystérieux 5. Musette miniature 6. Obstination	Silhouettes, Series I	for 2 violins (or violin and viola) and piano	
Orchestral	10	1895	Sinfonie fis-Moll	Symphony in F♯ minor	for orchestra	
Chamber music	11	1896	Streichquartett h-Moll	String Quartet in B minor	for 2 violins, viola and cello	unpublished
Piano	12	1899	6 Klavierstücke: 1. Capriccio, c-Moll; 2. Canzona, Fis-Dur; 3. Humoreske, Fis-Dur; 4. Etüde, h-Moll; 5. Intermezzo, a-Moll; 6. Ballade, D-Dur	6 Pieces	for piano	also published as 6 Konzertstücke
Vocal	13	1900	5 Lieder: 1. Klage der Gattin; 2. Erinnerung; 3. Jugend; 4. Wiegenlied; 5. Phantasus	5 Songs	for voice and piano	1. words by Richard Dehmel; 2. words by Rainer Maria Rilke; 3. words by Franz Evers; 4. words by Richard Dehmel; 5. words by Arno Holz
Piano	14	1900	Tanzrhythmen, 7 Stücke (Heft I und II)	Dancing Rhythms, 7 Pieces (Books I and II)	for piano 4-hands	
Chamber music	15	1901	Bratschensonate Nr. 1 D-Dur	Sonata No. 1 in D major	for viola and piano	
Orchestral	16	1901	5 Stücke für Streichorchester: 1. Kleine Ballade; 2. Schlummerlied; 3. Terzen-Intermezzo; 4. Elegie; 5. Tanz	5 Pieces	for string orchestra	
Chamber music	17	1901	Klaviertrio Nr. 1 a-Moll	Piano Trio No. 1 in A minor	for violin, cello and piano	
Piano	18	1901	Satyre und Nymphen, 9 Miniaturen: 1. Etude. „Najaden im Quell.“; 2. Idylle. „Pan mit der Syrinx.“; 3. Rêverie. „Träumende Oreade.“; 4. Intermezzo grotesque. „Pan philosophiert.“; 5. Valse lente. „Dryadenreigen im Mondschein.“; 6. Elegie. „Napaie in tiefer Betrübnis.“; 7. Humoreske. „Pan von Bacchus kommend.“; 8. Canzonetta. „Liebeständelei.“; 9. Scherzo. „Nymph flieh! Schnell! Satyr hascht dich!“	Satyrs and Nymphs, 9 Miniatures	for piano	
Chamber music		1901; 1901; 1901; 1903–1904	Trio-Miniaturen, Suite: 1. Rêverie, Op. 18 Nr. 3; 2. Humoreske, Op. 18 Nr. 7; 3. Elegie, Op. 18 Nr. 6; 4. Danse phantastique, Op. 24 Nr. 2	Trio Miniatures, Suite	for violin (or clarinet), cello (or viola) and piano	arrangement for piano trio by Mikhail Press (published 1920); 1.~3. original for piano solo from Satyre und Nymphen, Op. 18; 4. original for piano 4-hands from Tanzrhythmen, Op. 24
Chamber music	19	1901	3 Bagatellen (in der ersten Lage ausführbar): 1. Marsch; 2. Barcarole; 3. A.B.C.-Walzer	3 Bagatelles (in the First Position)	for violin and piano	
Piano	20	1902	Kleine Suite: 1. Trotzig, Zärtlich; 2. Traurig; 3. Geschwätzig; 4. Lustig	Little Suite	for piano	
Vocal	21	1907	3 Lieder: 1. Regen; 2. Märchen; 3. Der einsame Pfeifer	3 Songs	for voice and piano	words by Johannes Schlaf
Chamber music	22	1902	Sextett c-Moll	Sextet in C minor	for 2 violins, viola, 2 cellos and piano	
Piano	22a	1902, 1903	Sonate (nach dem Sextett)	Sonata (after the Sextet)	for 2 pianos	composer's arrangement of the Piano Sextet, Op. 22
Orchestral	23	1903	Sinfonie in A-Dur	Symphony in A major	for orchestra	
Piano	24	1903–1904	Tanzrhythmen, 5 Stücke (Heft III, IV und V)	Dancing Rhythms, 5 Pieces (Books III, IV und V)	for piano 4-hands	also published as Neue Tanzrytmen; No. 4 published in Die Musik, Jahrgang 3, 1903/04, Heft 2 Musikbeilage
Chamber music	25	1902	2 Stücke: 1. Sinnig; 2. Sonnig	2 Pieces	for clarinet (or violin) and piano	
Piano	26	1903	Präludien und Capricen, 10 Stücke: 1. Praeludium, f-Moll; 2. Capriccietto, E-Dur; 3. Praeludium, cis-Moll; 4. Intermezzo, D-Dur; 5. Praeludium, d-Moll; 6. Capriccietto, F-Dur; 7. Praeludietto, G-Dur; 8. Praeludium, c-Moll; 9. Intermezzo, G-Dur; 10. Capriccio, H-Dur	Preludes and Caprices, 10 Pieces	for piano	
Chamber music	27	1905	Oktett	Octet	for violin, viola, cello, oboe, clarinet, horn, bassoon and piano	
Chamber music	27a	1905	Septett	Septet	for 2 violins, 2 violas, 2 cellos and piano	composer's arrangement from the Octet
Chamber music	27	1905, 1907	Kammersinfonie B-Dur	Chamber Symphony in B♭ major	for string orchestra, oboe, clarinet, horn, bassoon and piano	after the Octet (1905)
Chamber music	28	1904	4 Stücke: 1. Ballade; 2. Arioso; 3. Berceuse; 4. Rondo	4 Pieces	for violin and piano: 3. also for violin and small orchestra	
Chamber music	29	1904	Streichquartett Nr. 2 a-Moll	String Quartet No. 2 in A minor	for 2 violins, viola and cello	
Piano	30	1905	Intime Harmonieen, 12 Impromptus: 1. Wogen; 2. Episode; 3. Elfchen; 4. Romantisches Wiegenlied; 5. Sonderbare Humoreske; 6. Intermezzo; 7. Es geht die Sage; 8. Kleine Tarantelle; 9. Sphinx; 10. Narretei; 11. Ruhige Liebe; 12. Zu grabe tragen	Intimate Harmonies, 12 Impromptus	for piano	
Orchestral	31	1906	Vægtervise (Wächterweise), Fantasie nach dänischen Volksliedern E-Dur	Vægtervise (Watchman's Song), Fantasy on Danish Folk Songs in E major	for orchestra	
Piano	32	1906	Psyche, Tanzpoëm von H. Regel: 1. Liebesgang und Lilienmädchenwalzer; 2. Intermezzo; 3. Irrlichtertanz	Psyche, Dance-Poem by H. Regel	for piano	also orchestrated
Orchestral	32a	1906	Psyche (Tanzpoëm von H. Regel), Ballet-Suite	Psyche (Dance-Poem by H. Regel), Ballet Suite	for orchestra	original for piano
Orchestral	32/2	1906, 1929	Intermezzo aus dem Tanzpoëm "Psyche"	Intermezzo from the Dance-Poem "Psyche"	for violin and piano	original for piano
Chamber music	33; 33a	1906	Klavierquintett Nr. 1 d-Moll	Piano Quintet No. 1 in D minor	for violin, 2 violas, cello and piano for 2 violins, viola, cello and piano	
Chamber music	34	c.1906	Divertimento in C-Dur: 1. Variationen; 2. Nachtstück; 3. Exotisches Intermezzo; 4. Ländler	Divertimento in C major	for clarinet and 2 violas	
Orchestral	35	1906	Aus einem Tagebuch, Symphonische Skizzen	From a Diary, Symphonic Sketches (Suite)	for orchestra	unpublished
Chamber music	36	1908	Bagatellen, 8 leichte Stücke (I–III Lage): 1. Melodie, D-Dur; 2. Karnevals-Marsch, d-Moll; 3. Wiegenlied, a-Moll; 4. Canzonetta, G-Dur; 5. Walzer, D-Dur; 6. Nordisch, a-Moll; 7. Etüde; 8. Schwedische Tanzklänge, g-Moll	Bagatelles, 8 Easy Pieces: 1. Melodie in D major 2. Joyous March in D minor 3. Lullaby in A minor 4. Canzonetta in G major 5. Waltz in D major 6. Nordisk in A minor 7. Etude; 8. Swedish Dance in G minor	for violin (or flute) and piano	
Chamber music	37	1907	Rhapsodie, Klavierquartett Nr. 1 F-Dur	Rhapsodie, Piano Quartet No. 1 in F major	for violin, viola, cello and piano	inspired by the novel Gösta Berlings Saga by Selma Lagerlöf
Piano	38	1907	Den Kindern zum Lauschen, Allerlei Klavierstücke der Jugend zum Vorspielen: 1. Mutter erzählt Märchen; 2. Rosemarie tanzt 3. Der Steinbaukasten; 4. Das Heimchen; 5. Die Trübselige Puppe; 6. Wiegenliedchen	The Children That Listen, Sundry Pieces for Children to Play: 1. Mother Tells Tales; 2. Rosemarie Dances; 3. The Box of Bricks; 4. The Cricket; 5. The Afflicted Doll; 6. Cradle Song	for piano	
Chamber music	39	1908	Trio-Caprice (nach "Gösta Berling" von Selma Lagerlöf), Klaviertrio Nr. 2 D-Dur	Trio-Caprice, Piano Trio No. 2 in D major	for violin, cello and piano	inspired by the novel Gösta Berlings Saga by Selma Lagerlöf
Chamber music	39a	1908	Trio-Caprice (nach "Gösta Berling" von Selma Lagerlöf)	Trio-Caprice	for piano 4-hands	arrangement by the composer original for violin, cello and piano inspired by the novel Gösta Berlings Saga by Selma Lagerlöf
Orchestral	40	1909	Eine Serenadenmusik	A Serenade Music	for orchestra	in 3 movements
Piano	41	1908	Tanzrhythmen, 5 Stücke (Heft VI und VII)	Dancing Rhythms, 5 Pieces (Books VI and VII)	for piano 4-hands	also published as Tanzrytmen, Dritte Folge
Concertante	42	1909	Violinkonzert Nr. 1 h-Moll	Concerto No. 1 in B minor	for violin and orchestra	dedicated to violinist Mikhail Press
Chamber music	43	1909	Silhouettes, 2^{me} Série: 1. Prélude; 2. Chant d'amour 3. 3 Intermezzi; 4. Mélancolie; 5. Danse grotesque	Silhouettes, Series II	for 2 violins (or violin and viola) and piano	
Chamber music	44	1909	Klavierquintett Nr. 2 F-Dur	Piano Quintet No. 2 in F major	for 2 violins, viola, cello and piano	
Concertante	45	1912	Episodes concertantes, Konzert d-Moll	Episodes concertantes, Concerto in D minor	for violin, cello, piano and orchestra	Triple Concerto; dedicated to Tor Aulin
Piano	46	1911	2 Schelmenweisen: 1. Keck und frisch 2. Ungestüm, frech und Schneidend	2 Playful Tunes	for piano	
Piano	47	1911	Sonatine G-Dur	Sonatina in G major	for piano	
Piano	48	1911	4 Miniaturen: 1. Intermezzo. „Der melancholische Hampelmann“, f-Moll; 2. Berceuse. „Die Mutter an der Wiege“, F-Dur; 3. Scherzo. „Spuk“, a-Moll; 4. Minuet. „Aus alter Zeit“, e-Moll	4 Miniatures	for piano	
Concertante	49	1912	Violinkonzert Nr. 2 A-Dur	Concerto No. 2 in A major	for violin and orchestra	dedicated to violinist Franz von Vecsey
Chamber music	50	1912	Klavierquartett Nr. 2 G-Dur	Piano Quartet No. 2 in G major	for violin, viola, cello and piano	
Chamber music	51	1912	Divertimento F-Dur	Divertimento in F major	for flute, oboe, clarinet, horn, bassoon and piano	
Chamber music	52	1912	2 kleine Stücke: 1. Sárika – Arietta; 2. Árva – Valse mignonne	2 Little Pieces	for violin and piano	
Stage	53	1912	Im goldenen Tempelbuch verzeichnet, Bühnenmusik	The Golden Temple Book	for chamber ensemble	Incidental Music for the play by Carl Hauptmann (1858–1921) also Das goldene Tempelbuch
Chamber music	54	1913	Violoncellosonate [Nr. 2] a-Moll	Sonata [No. 2] in A minor	for cello and piano	
Piano	55	1913	10 Esquisses: 1. Canzonetta; 2. Arlequin; 3. Mélancolie; 4. Oriental; 5. Serenata; 6. Villanella; 7. Bizarrerie; 8. Intermezzo; 9. Danse grotesque 10. Ragotin (Variations)	10 Sketches	for piano	
Piano	56	1913	Moments lyriques: 1. Menuet; 2. Élégie; 3. Intermezzo; 4. Intimité; 5. Bagatelle; 6. Nostalgie (Valse lente); 7. Étude; 8. Berceuse; 9. Cortège; 10. Chant russe (Variations)	Lyrical Moments	for piano	
Stage	57	1913	Die armseligen Besenbinder, Bühnenmusik	The Poor Broom Makers	for chamber ensemble	Incidental Music for the play by Carl Hauptmann (1858–1921)
Piano	58	1913	2 kleine Walzer (leicht): 1. Farfalla, F-Dur; 2. Rondinella	2 Little Waltzes (Easy)	for piano	
Concertante	59		Mysterien, Tondichtung e-Moll	Mysteries, Tone Poem in E minor	for cello and orchestra	published 1928; after the novel Mysteries by Knut Hamsun
Chamber music	60	1915	Klaviertrio Nr. 3 G-Dur	Piano Trio No. 3 in G major	for violin, cello and piano	
Piano	61	1916	2 Walzer	2 Waltzes	for piano	
Piano	62		2 Suiten I. Suite: 1. Rondino; 2. Musette; 3. Ländler; II. Suite: 1. Polka; 2. Orientalisch; 3. Walzer	2 Suites	for piano	published 1929
Vocal	63	1914	Österreichisches Reiterlied		for voice and piano	
Chamber music	64	1915	8 Violinstücke	8 Pieces	for violin and piano	
Piano	65	1915	4 Klavierstücke: 1. Heitere Weisen, G-Dur; 2. Schlummerlied, F-Dur; 3. Exotisches Intermezzo, e-Moll; 4. Tanz, B-Dur	4 Pieces	for piano	
Choral	66	1915	Reiterlied		for chorus and piano	
Chamber music	67	1920	Streichquartett Nr. 3 d-Moll	String Quartet No. 3 in D minor	for 2 violins, viola and cello	published 1921
Piano	68	1918	Aus alter Zeit, Suite: 1. Sonata alla Bourrée; 2. Menuetto; 3. Ciacona; 4. Tambourin; 5. Gavotte	From Ancient Times, Suite	for piano 4-hands	published 1920
Chamber music	69	1920	Violinsonate Nr. 2 F-Dur	Sonata No. 2 in F major	for violin and piano	
Chamber music	70	1919	Litaniae, Tondichtung cis-Moll	Litaniae, Tone Poem in C♯ minor	for violin, cello and piano	published 1920, 1929 premiere 31 May 1919
Vocal		1920	Jüdische Volkslieder	Jewish Folk Songs	for medium voice and piano	8 song settings from the collection by Juon; other settings by Wilhelm Grosz
Vocal		1920	Russische Volkslieder	Russian Folk Songs	for medium voice and piano	12 song settings from the collection by Juon; other settings by Felix Petyrek and Wilhelm de Witt
Vocal		1920	Slavische (ukrainische) Volkslieder	Slavic (Ukrainian) Folk Songs	for medium voice and piano	4 song settings from a collection by Juon; other settings by Wilhelm Grosz, Hugo Kauder, Richard Kügele, Egon Lustgarten, Bernard Paumgartner and Felix Petyrek
Piano	71	1924	Jotunheimen, Tondichtung	Jotunheimen, Tone Poem	for 2 pianos	subtitled Ein rauhes Nordisches Bergland, das "Heim der Frost- u. Reifriesen" (A Rugged Nordic Mountain Country, the "Home of the Frost Giants")
Chamber music	72	1922	5 Compositions: 1. Chant d'amour 2. Élégie; 3. Valsette; 4. Chant du berceau (Lullaby); 5. Humoresque	5 Compositions	for violin and piano	
Chamber music	73		Arabesken, Kleines Trio	Arabesques, Little Trio	for oboe, clarinet and bassoon	published 1941; composed 1940? 4 movements
Piano	74	1921	Kinderträume, 15 Klavierstücke für die Jugend: 1. Mutti spricht 2. Püppchens Geburtstag; 3. Wiegenliedchen; 4. Beim Spiel; 5. Zank und Hader; 6. Püppchen weint 7. Tanzmäuse; 8. Lied; 9. Das Schaukelpferd; 10. Der Hirtenknabe; 11. Die Mundharmonika; 12. Es regnet 13. Der Hampelmann; 14. Die Gouvernante	Children's Dreams, 15 Pieces for Children	for piano	also published 1927 in 2 books
Piano	75	1924	Die Unzertrennlichen (Les petits inséparables), 8 leichte Stücke: 1. Guten Morgen; 2. Gute Nacht; 3. Springtanz; 4. Menuett; 5. Vergißmeinnicht; 6. Ländler; 7. Tarantella; 8. Maitag; 9. Im Gänsemarsch	The Little Inseparables, 8 Easy Pieces: 1. Morning Song; 2. Night Song; 3. Spring Dance; 4. Menuet; 5. Forget-me-not; 6. Country Dance; 7. Tarantella; 8. May Day; 9. Lantern March	for piano 4-hands	
Piano	76	1923	Kakteen, 7 Klavierstücke	Cactuses, 7 Pieces	for piano	
Piano	77	1924	5 Klavier-Kompositionen (Klavierstücke): 1. Idylle; 2. Capriccietto; 3. Canzona; 4. Impromptu; 5. Tanz (Danse)	5 Compositions	for piano	
Chamber music	78	1923	Flötensonate F-Dur	Sonata in F major	for flute and piano	
Piano	79	1923	5 Tongedichte: 1. Upon a Balmy Summer Sunday; 2. A Long-lost Tune; 3. Evening Mists; 4. The Juggler: Der Gaukler aus fernem fremden Land; 5. Mazurian Courtship	5 Tone Poems	for piano	
Piano	80	1930	In Futurum 2, 4 Klavierstücke: 1. Dämmerstunde daheim 2. In Perrücke und Reifrock; 3. Der gefangene Ruße; 4. Jungburschen ziehen aus	In Futurum 2, 4 Pieces	for piano	
Chamber music	81	1928	7 kleine Tondichtungen	7 Little Tone Poems	for 2 violins and piano	
Chamber music	82	1923	Klarinettensonate f-Moll	Sonata in F minor	for clarinet and piano	also for viola and piano
Chamber music	82a	1923	Bratschensonate Nr. 2 f-Moll	Sonata No. 2 in F minor	for viola and piano	composer's adaptation of the Clarinet Sonata
Chamber music	83	1930	Legende D-Dur	Legende in D major	for violin, cello and piano	
Chamber music	84	1928	Bläserquintett	Wind Quintet in B♭ major	for flute, oboe, clarinet, horn and bassoon	
Orchestral	85	1928	Serenade (für Schülerorchester)	Serenade in G major	for string orchestra with piano ad libitum	for student orchestra
Chamber music	86	1930	Violinsonate Nr. 3 h-Moll	Sonata No. 3 in B minor	for violin and piano	
Orchestral	87	1929	Kleine Sinfonie (für Schülerorchester)	Little Symphony in A minor	for string orchestra with piano ad libitum	for student orchestra
Concertante	88	1931	Violinkonzert Nr. 3 a-Moll	Concerto No. 3 in A minor	for violin and orchestra	
Chamber music	89	1932	Suite C-Dur	Suite in C major	for violin, cello and piano	in 5 movements
Piano	90	1933	4 Klavierstücke: 1. Schelmenweise; 2. Besinnlichkeit; 3. Nächtlicher Aufzug; 4. Nordischer Mittsommertag	4 Pieces	for piano	
Piano	91	1933	6 leichte Klavierstücke für die Jugend	6 Easy Pieces for the Young	for piano	
Orchestral	92	1933	Divertimento (für Schülerorchester)	Divertimento	for string orchestra and piano	for student orchestra
Orchestral	93	1935	Suite in fünf Sätzen	Suite in Five Movements	for orchestra	
Orchestral	94	1938	Anmut und Würde, Suite	Grace and Dignity, Suite	for orchestra	
Orchestral	95	1939	Rhapsodische Sinfonie	Rhapsodic Symphony	for orchestra	
Orchestral	96	1941	Tanz-Capricen	Dance Caprices	for orchestra	
Concertante	97	1940	Burletta	Burletta	for violin and orchestra	
Orchestral	98	1939	Sinfonietta capricciosa	Sinfonietta capricciosa	for orchestra	
Vocal	99	1941	3 Lieder: 1. Paradies (Paradis); 2. Die drei Schwestern (Le tre sorelle); 3. Tröstung (La consolation)	3 Songs	for voice and piano	1. words by Stella Juon; 2. words from Belfonte (1903) by Francesco Pastonchi; 3. words by Stella Juon

== Sources ==
- International Juon Society: Catalogue of Works
- List of Works by Paul Juon at Musinfo, The Database of Swiss Music
- Free scores by Paul Juon at the International Music Score Library Project (IMSLP)
