= Bay View Association =

Coordinates: 45°23′08″N 84°55′49″W

- The Bay View Association of the United Methodist Church
- U.S. National Register of Historic Places
- U.S. National Historic Landmark District
- Michigan State Historic Site
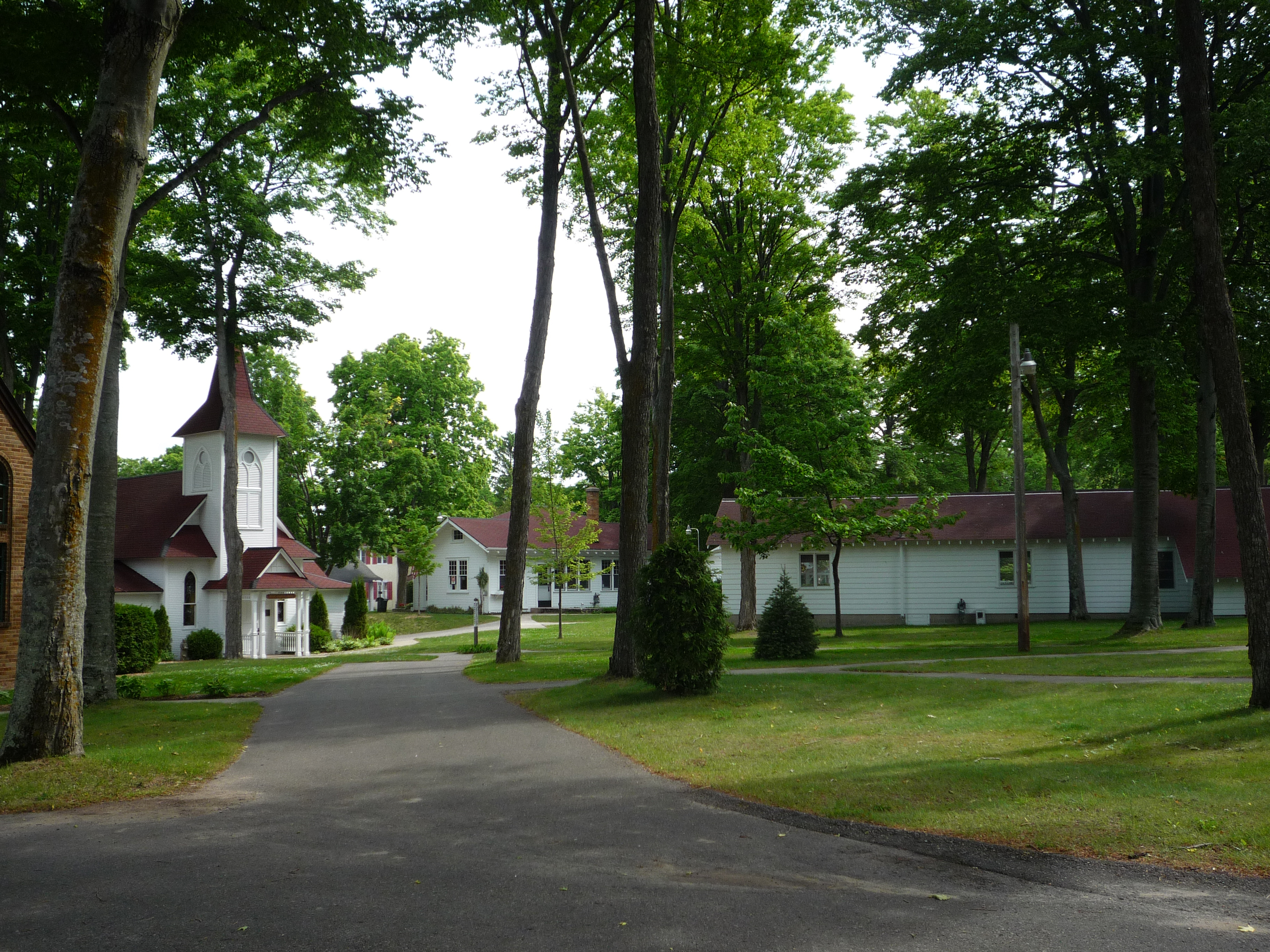
- Crouse Chapel and some of the main Association Grounds

- Location within Michigan Location within the United States
- Interactive map
- Nearest city: Petoskey, Michigan
- Built: 1876
- Architect: Eastlake, Stick, Queen Anne, Shingle
- Architectural style: Colonial Revival, Late Victorian
- NRHP reference No.: 72000613

Significant dates
- Added to NRHP: March 16, 1972
- Designated NHLD: December 23, 1987
- Designated MSHS: June 5, 1957

The Bay View Association of the United Methodist Church, known as Bay View, is an example of two uniquely American community forms: the Methodist camp meeting and the independent Chautauqua. Designed for the first purpose in 1876 as the county's only romantically-planned campground, and adapted for the second from 1885 to 1915, Bay View has remained in continuous operation since its foundation.

== Description ==
Bay View is incorporated as a domestic nonprofit organization under Act 39 of the Public Acts of 1899, being MCL 455.51. Act 39 of the Public Acts of 1899 establishes Bay View as a body politic and corporate. The association was originally formed as part of the Methodist Camp Meeting movement and adopted a Chautauqua program in 1886.

The association's grounds contain approximately 440 cottages and 30 community-owned buildings. There are two hotels on premises: Stafford's Bay View Inn (1886), and The Terrace Inn and 1911 Restaurant. Other facilities include a post office, beach with a swim area, children's pool and a sail house. The community is located on about 340 heavily wooded acres (140 ha), dropping in a series of terraces from a 200-foot elevation (61 m) to the shore of Little Traverse Bay. Residents lease the land under the cottages from the Association, which charges annual Chautauqua fees and taxes.

Bay View is located in the U.S. state of Michigan. It is located in Bear Creek Township, Emmet County on Little Traverse Bay and abuts the east side of the city of Petoskey along U.S. Highway 31. The ZIP code is 49770 and the FIPS place code is 06260. The association is bounded by Little Traverse Bay on the north, Division Road on the east, Petoskey city limits on the west, and on the south by the south line of Township 35 North. The Bay View census-designated place (CDP) includes the association grounds and additional areas east of Division Road. As of the 2010 census the population of the CDP was 133, due to the inclusion of an area outside of the association grounds in the CDP.

=== Architecture ===
Nearly all the structures in the community were built in the 1875–1900 time period. Most buildings are Eastlake and Stick style, with some Queen Anne and Shingle style architecture. Cottages are set on 50-foot lots (15 m) along gently curving streets running along the natural terraces. In the center of the community is The Campus (originally Tabernacle Park). Many of the larger communal structures are located here, including the original 1877 preaching stand, as well an 1880 book store and multiple educational buildings constructed around 1890. In 1879, an artesian well water system was installed, providing spring water. However, the pipes were laid very shallowly, and had to be drained in the winter months to prevent freezing. Now, the community is closed from November through April, during which time the residences on the association grounds must be vacated. John M. Hall Auditorium, replaced the 1881 Chapel and the 1887 New Tabernacle/Old Auditorium.

== History ==
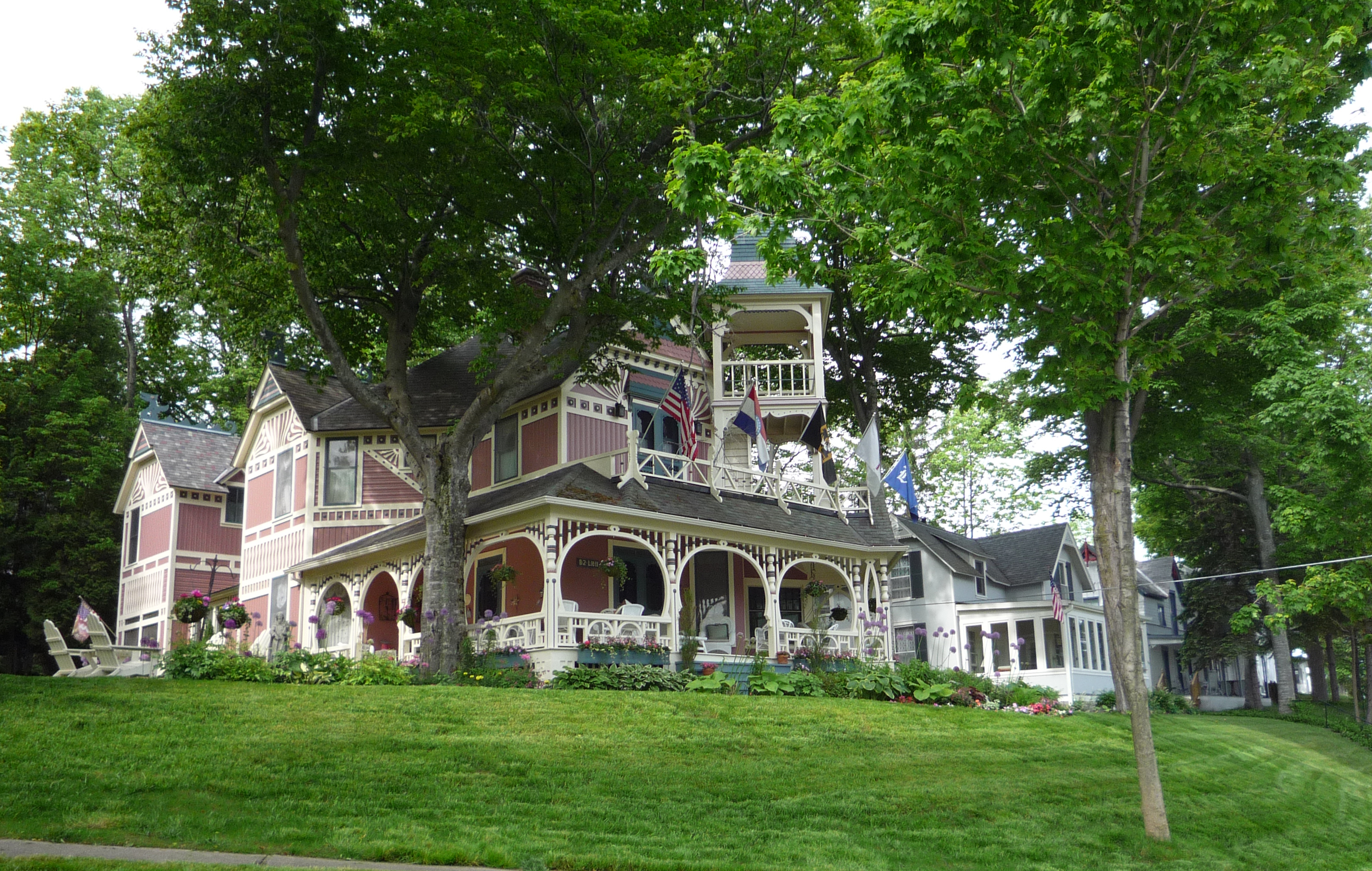
Cottages in Bay View

Bay View was founded in 1875 by Michigan Methodists as a camp meeting "for scientific and intellectual culture, and for the promotion of religion and morality." Bay View's origins can be traced to the camp meeting movement which saw the development of similar resorts such as Wesleyan Grove on Martha's Vineyard, Ocean Grove, New Jersey, or Lakeside, Ohio.

The group considered multiple locations, and eventually struck a deal with the citizens of Petoskey and the Grand Rapids and Indiana Railroad, where the Petoskey citizenry would pay to extend the railroad line from their town to Bay View, the railroad would purchase the site, and the Methodists would agree to improve the location and hold camp meetings there for fifteen years. In 1876, the first group of Methodists travelled to the site, cleared an area of underbrush, and built a preaching stand and an audience area under the trees. Dr. Seth Reed chose the name of Bay View. He was secretary of the Bay View Association for 14 years. Dr. Reed platted the grounds and named the streets, some of which were named after early settlers. On August 2, 1876, the first meeting was held at the site. Dr. Pilcher suggested the name Bay View, and selected the site of the Speaker's Stand. He wrote articles of incorporation, stating the assembly was "organized for intellectual and scientific culture, and for the promotion of the cause of religion and morality." Shelter at the time was only in tents. Construction of cottages began almost immediately, and by 1881 there were about 150 at the site. By this time, the original religious-oriented camp meeting program had languished and the association hired John M. Hall to organize Bay View's interdenominational Assembly program: a "Christian Institution of the broadest catholicity." Departments included Bible, Missionary, Social, Health, Industrial, Country Life: American and International.

Under the leadership of John M. Hall, Bay View adopted a Chautauqua program which included a series of educational lectures, classes, entertainment, political speeches, and music, began in 1886, and the community developed around these activities. These programs, along with programs for children and a variety of classes, took place in July and August of each year. The program was immensely successful, as a result, number of cottages in the community soared, with 200 in 1887, 400 in 1895, and 500 in 1901. Many of these newcomers were from other, non-Methodist denominations, and many stayed all summer rather than for only a few weeks of the year. Hall writes of the transformation of Bay View from its camp meeting roots to a Chautauqua: "founded by Methodists, it is now by its organic law interdenominational in management and life. People of every denomination are there in large numbers and so beautiful is the hospitality of ideas that another's specific church affiliations never occurs to one." In 1887, the Bay View Summer University opened. The University was associated with Albion College in 1919 until 1969.

The Bay View Association was listed as a National Historic Landmark district in 1987 as "one of the finest remaining examples of two uniquely American community forms, the Methodist Camp Meeting and the independent Chautauqua."

== The Four Pillars of Chautauqua ==
Bay View's continues to the Chautauqua program established by John M. Hall to this day. The four pillars are arts, education, recreation, and religion.

=== Religion ===
Sundays find members and visitors participating in Communion, Sunday School and Assembly Worship. Vespers are now concerts beginning and ending with a hymn and closing benediction. Carillon bells call us to Worship and eventide. Youth groups, Bible studies and prayer meetings are offered throughout the summer. Daily Religion and Life lectures offer further study from Sunday's preacher.

History - Founders desired a setting for spiritual refreshment and renewal of soul, mind and body. "We came to worship God, to establish a center of Christian influence,...a place where Christian people could meet, enjoy fellowship...where God shall be honored..." "Tabernacle Park", in the center of the grounds was "God's first temple", the camp meeting place. "Rev. Dr. E.H. Pilcher, president, preached the opening sermon in 1876..., dedicating the grounds to the worship of Almighty God." Soon thousands came by rail and boat for all-day Big Sundays filled with worship, singing, and learning. Local Odawa and Ojibwa attended camp meeting services, where "Chief Petoskey's granddaughter accompanied the singing on the pump organ." By 1885 Ministerial Unions, Preacher's Conferences for lay preachers and teachers were added. Bay View's 25th anniversary pamphlet highlights that "Though a Methodist Institution, Bay View is not a church or denominational establishment, but a Christian Institution of the broadest catholicity, welcoming to full membership all men and women of any or no denomination who have a desire to be part of such a community as this."

The first Sunday School Congress, 1877, featured famous preachers and teachers including Rev. Jesse Lyman Hurlbut and Frank Beard, initiator of Chalk Talks. Inspirational lessons were taken from the "Course of Sabbath School Normal Lessons," developed at the Chautauqua Sunday School Conference. Horace Hitchcock took over the popular Bay View Sunday school in 1886. Donations from state Sunday Schools provided funds for building of Hitchcock Hall, dedicated in 1889. John H. Vincent sent Chautauqua congratulations.

=== Music Festival ===
The Bay View Music Festival is one of the longest running collegiate chamber music festivals in North America. It was begun in 1886 with the choir from Court Street Methodist Church from Flint, Michigan. The program grew rapidly led by respected musicians from conservatories in Detroit, Ann Arbor, and Chicago. The music program has been associated and accredited through Oberlin College, Cornell College, DePaul University, Albion College, Alma College, and the University of Michigan. Most noted among the directors in the festival's 132-year history is William Reddick and Howard Barlow. Concertmaster Max Bendix of the Theodore Thomas Orchestra in Chicago was the first of many violinists including Robert Mann, Mikhail Press, Leon Marx, concertmaster of the Chicago Opera Orchestra and Austrian violinist Hugo Gottesmann.

Madame Schumann Heink, Gladys Swarthout, John Charles Thomas, Richard Crooks, James Melton, Jennie Tourel, Martha Lipton, Thomas L. Thomas, Walter Taussig, Etta Moten, Mildred Dilling, Ossip and Clara Gabrilovisch, Jerome Hines, Sherrill Milnes, Diane Bish, George Shirley, Boston Brass, Ara Berberian, Martina Arroyo, and Virginia Zeani, are a few of the musicians to teach and perform at Bay View. The Fisk Jubilee Singers made four appearances as did other jubilee groups. The Williams' Jubilee Singers were the featured group to open the John M. Hall Auditorium in 1914.

The festival has followed the national trends over the decades in featuring large choral works, classical music, devotional repertoire, chamber music, and recently has included a wide variety of popular groups to appeal the variety of musical tastes.

Theatrical production date back to the 1890s with road shows such as the Ben Greet Players and sporadic local productions. It became a regular feature of the Performing Arts Department when New York tenor Director Willard Pierce joined the music staff. Plays, musicals, children's productions, and opera productions are all featured on the annual schedule.

Today, the Bay View Music Festival offers approximately 180 students scholarships for coaching and teaching chamber music, vocal performance, collaborative piano, opera, musical theater taught by over 40 faculty members. An annual hand bell concert features directors and professionals from all over the US. A special opera seminar is offered in June. The 10-week program includes a mix of nearly 80 theatrical productions, recitals, chamber music concerts, choral performances, brass, woodwind and string instrument concerts and appearances by classical artists and famous jazz and popular individuals and groups.

=== Recreation ===
The Bay View Recreation program offers recreational activities for people of all ages and has always been a primary element of the Bay View Association. It is one of the pillars of its Chautauqua foundation. The program revolves around the Day Camp (Boys & Girls Club) that offers a safe, stimulating environment in which children participate in healthy and creative activities. From mid-June to August, children participate in age-appropriate morning activities at Tot Lot (ages 3–4), Fawns (5-6), and Boys' And Girls' Club (7-14). These activities include games, athletics, arts & crafts, songs, scavenger hunts, and educational programming. The camp is located at Swift Field, centrally located in the community. Every Friday, an all-camp event is held for a large group activity such as the carnival, capture the flag, and the Ernie Gray Olympics. In the afternoon, activities move to the waterfront where children can participate in swimming, tennis, and sailing, including lessons in each activity. Weekend activities include tennis tournaments and sailing races. On Monday nights, the recreation program hosts a community hotdog roast. The motto of the Boys and Girls Club is "Fun and recreation for all."

The recreational facilities include Swift Field, the Tot Lot building, the Fawn House, the Boys & Girls Club clubhouse, the craft house, 3 playgrounds, 9 tennis courts, 4 pickleball courts, the boathouse (with sunfish, lasers, kayaks, paddle boards, and other boats available for use by the community), a beach, a children's pool, a teen center, a fitness trail, lawn bowling, shuffleboard, and croquet courts. There are also 167 acres of pristine woods with trails along with multiple parks and open spaces around the community grounds.

In 2020, Bay View enhanced its waterfront with a 125-foot extension to its pier. This was a multimillion dollar project aimed at increasing safety for the swimming and boating areas and to protect against erosion.

History - The site of Bay View was chosen in part for its recreational opportunities. In 1875, the Conference Committee tasked with locating a proposed site for what would become Bay View foresaw "the great summer resort of the northwest…for scores of miles in almost every direction offers facilities for recreation which are simply endless." At the 2nd Annual Meeting, the trustees were asked to amend the By Laws to add the Committee on Recreations to its list of standing Committees. By 1901, the Boys and Girls Club was established.

In 1910, additional development expanded the waterfront program with the construction of Recreation Hall on the shoreline. The building contained a swimming pool and a 4-lane bowling alley. Long since removed, the building now houses the "Rec Club" teen center and the boathouse. In the early 1920s, what would become Swift Field was developed. Since its dedication in 1924, it has been the central location for land-based recreational activities for youth, including baseball, archery, tetherball, badminton, and ping-pong. In 1955, the Boys and Girls Clubhouse was erected at Swift Field. The Boys & Girls Club evolved during this time and came to its modern form under the direction of Ernie Gray. Activities were organized for children, ages 3–14. Swimming lessons, sailing, and tennis were also incorporated into the afternoon programming.

=== Education ===
Education has been an important part of the Chautauqua movement, beginning with the New York Chautauqua Institution then spreading to Bay View Association and other Midwest Chautauquas.

Bay View offered more than sixty classes in 2017 including art, literature, history, reading circles, and culinary classes. Education classes have been offered in Bay View for over a century. In 1888, a comprehensive set of Education courses was offered. This School of Liberal Arts attracted college professors to teach the courses. A School of Elocution was part of the curriculum in that year.

Guest Lecturers have been enhancing the summer experience for over one hundred years. In 1895, Jane Addams, leader of the settlement house movement, spoke on 'The Inception, Establishment, & Accomplishments of Chicago's Hull House'. She returned in 1903 to speak on her controversial stand on saloons and dancing. Helen Keller came to speak in 1913 on 'The Heart & the Hand; or the Right use of our senses'. Each year American Experience lecturers visit and speak on campus, as well as Faith lecturers as part of the Religion Program. Recent Lecturers include David Kennedy in 2016. Professor Kennedy, a Pulitzer Prize winner, presented a series of lectures on 'WWII and the World It Made'. Reverend Dr. Barbara Essex gave a series of 5 lectures in 2012. Dr. Akhil Reed Amar, Professor of Constitutional Law at Yale University lectured in 2012 and will be the 2018 American Experience speaker.

Each year, Bay View initiates a 'Big Read' where a book is selected for all the surrounding communities to read. The author visits in July and holds a discussion on Bay View's campus. In 2017 the 'Big Read' was "Terror in the City of Champions – Murder, Baseball, and the Secret Society that Shocked Depression-era Detroit" by Tom Stanton.

== Gallery ==
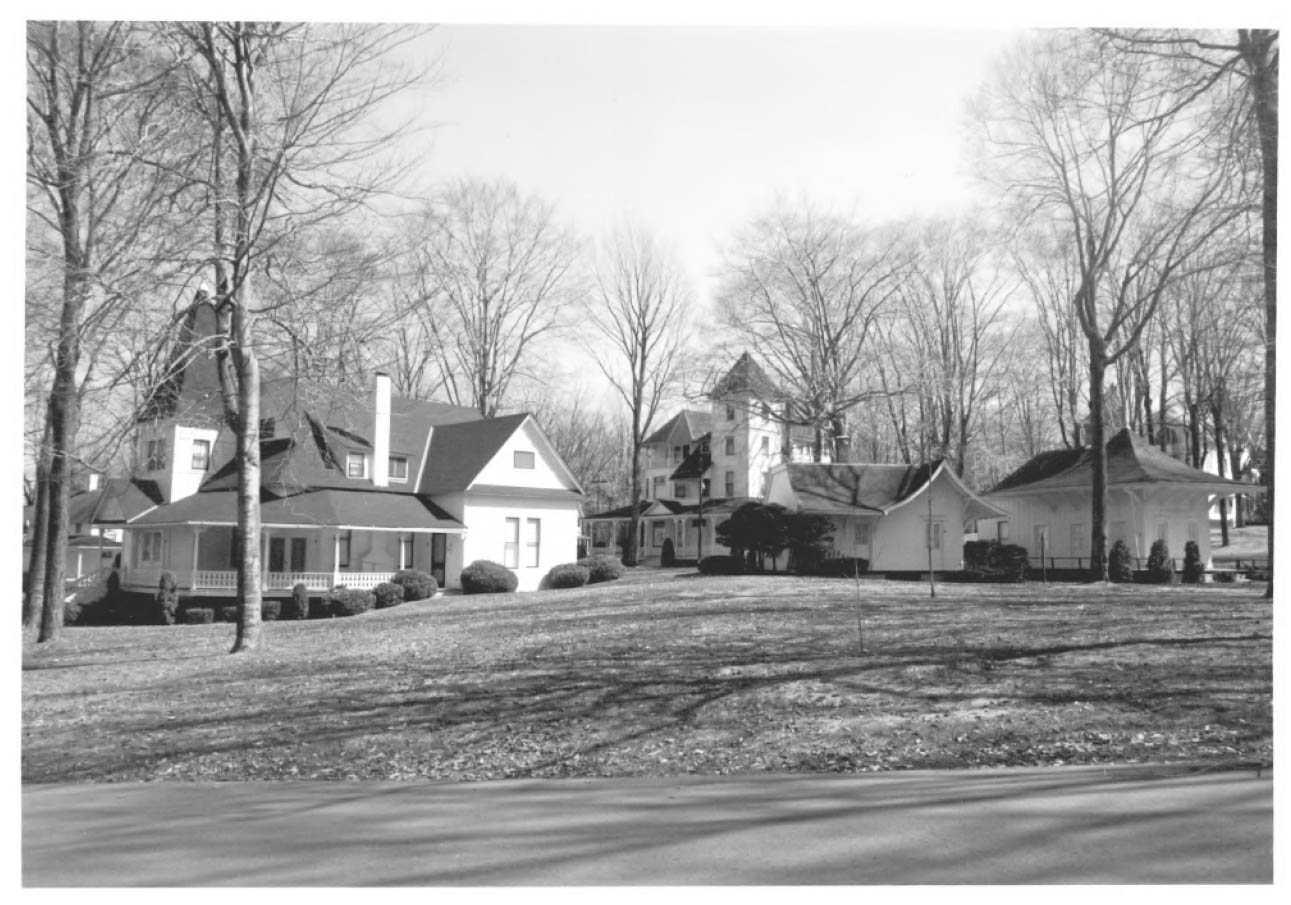
Bay View in 1986

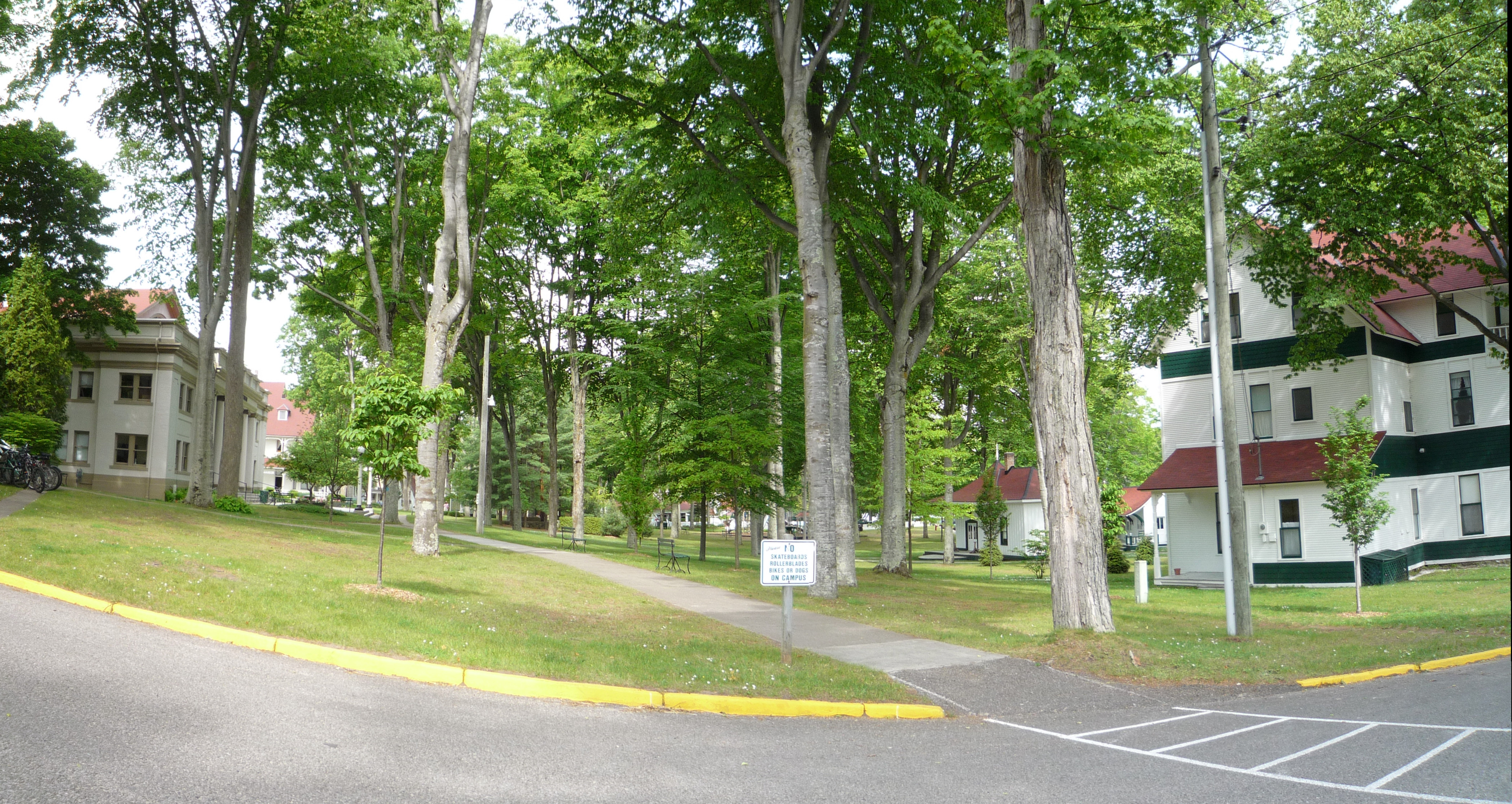
View of Association Grounds

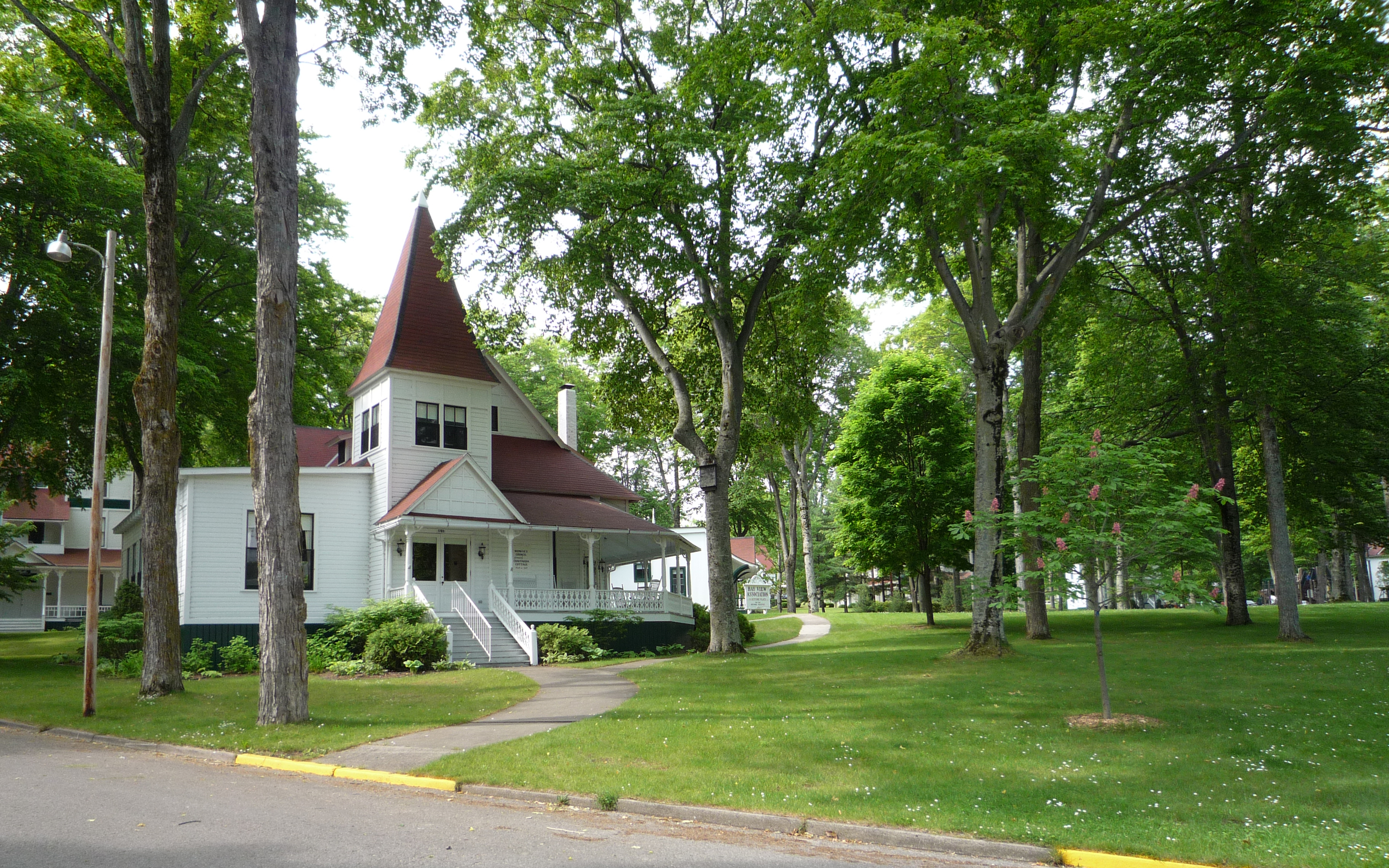
Woman's Council building

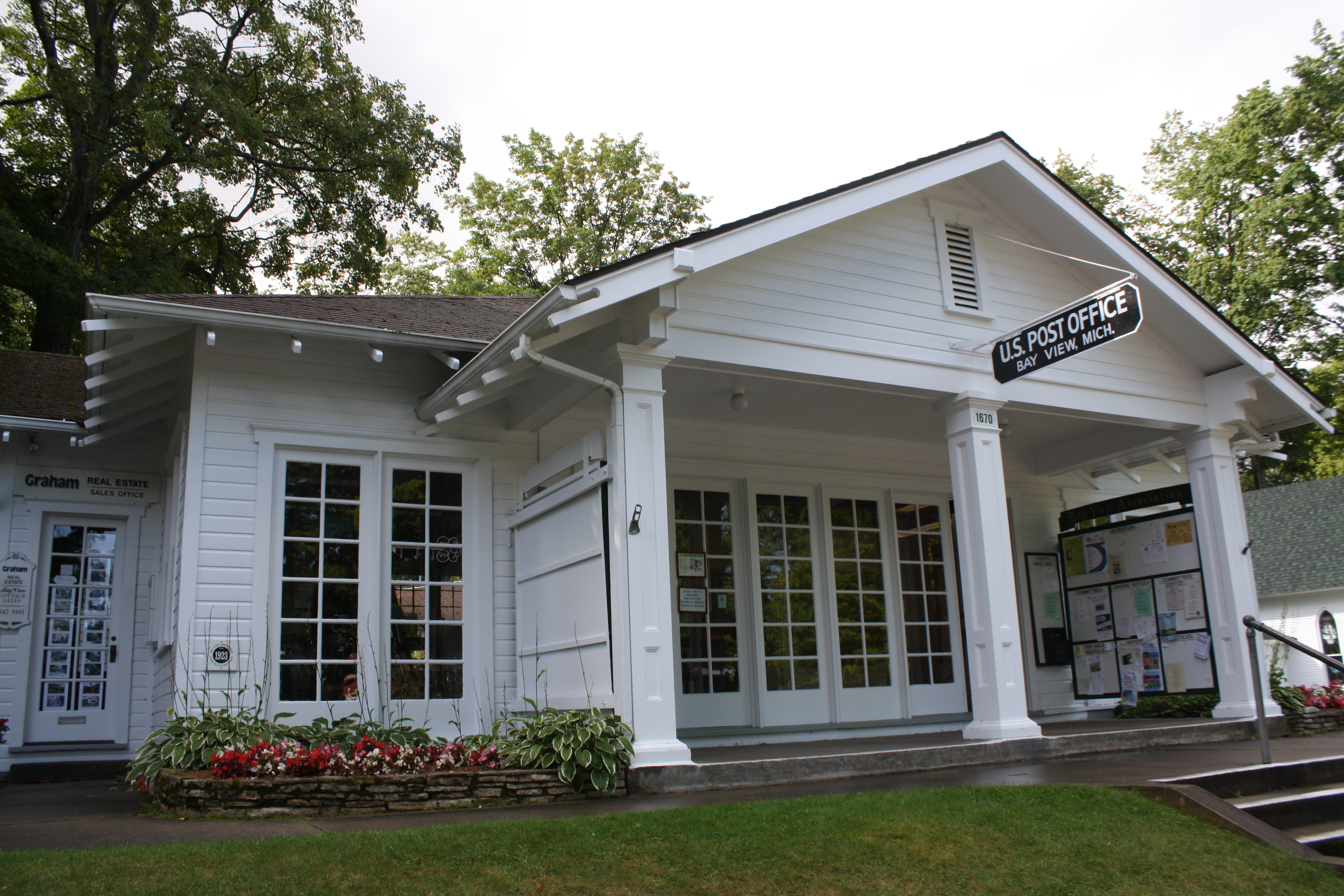
Post office

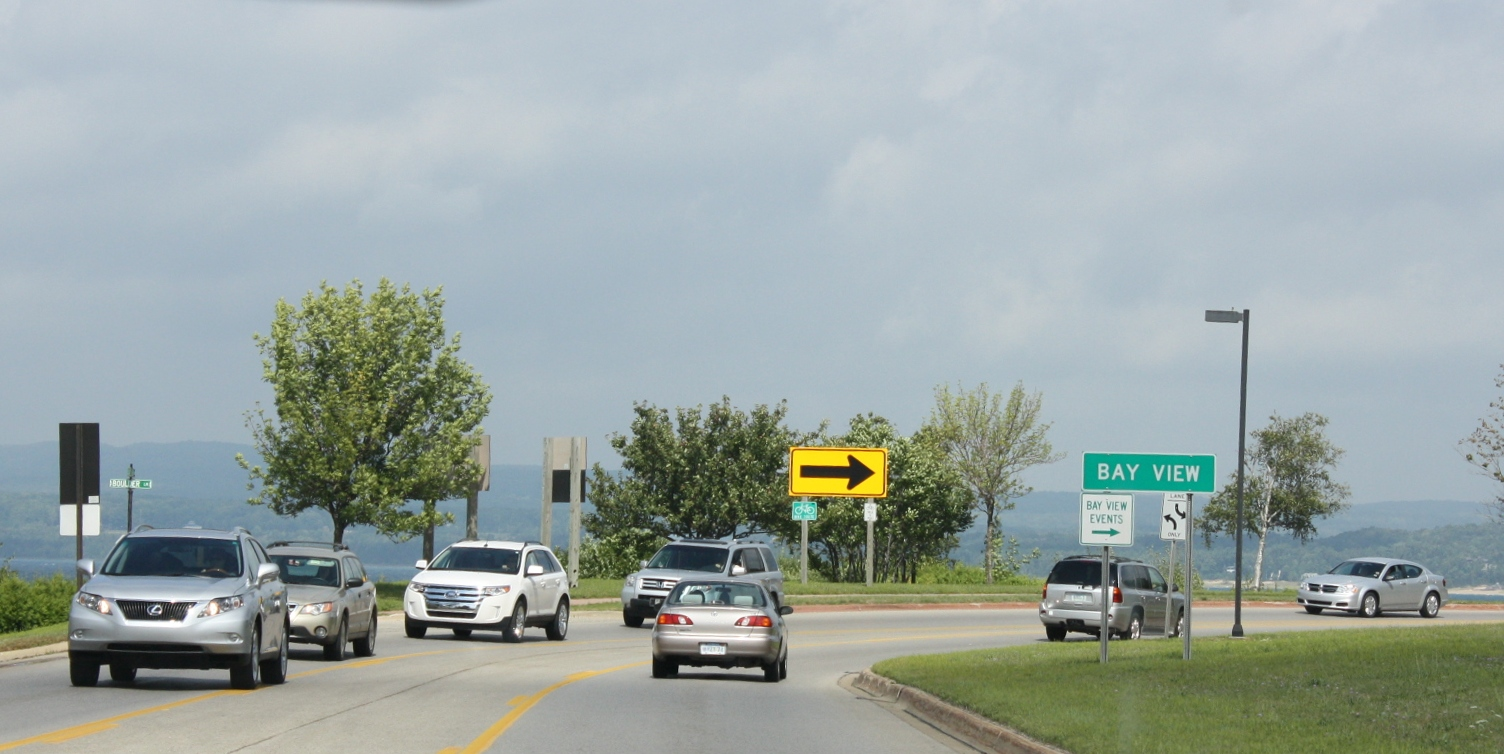
Bay View sign on US31

== Controversies ==
On August 7, 2018 the Bay View Association removed the requirement that members be of "Christian persuasion." Nearly 70 percent of Bay View members voted in favor of the amendment, which immediately went into effect. Membership in the Bay View Association is required to own a cottage in the community. That vote left in place a bylaw which required that five of the nine members of the resort's ruling board must be Methodist. A subsequent lawsuit resulted in a consent decree, approved by the board on July 9, 2019, which removed that requirement.

The Bay View Association has had other membership requirements. When the association was founded in 1875 there were no explicit requirements, but in 1942 the Bay View Board adopted the following resolution: "No person shall be accepted as a member of this association or be allowed to rent or lease property or a room, for longer than a period of one day, unless such person is of the white race and a Christian who must provide acceptable and good recommendations. This resolution does not apply to servants within a household or to employes[sic]".

In 1947 the by-laws were revised to add "Any person twenty-one years of age and good moral character, by a two-thirds vote of the Board of Trustees, may be accepted as a member of this Association provided that he or she is of the Caucasian race and of Christian persuasion." The two provisions Caucasian requirements were removed in 1959.

From the 1960s through to the 1980s there was a quota on how many Catholics were allowed to be members. Membership of Catholics was not to exceed 10% of the total membership. Once the quota was met additional Catholics applicants were rejected. This quota requirement was abandoned in the 1980s.

On August 6, 2011, the Bay View Association members voted on a proposal that would remove the Christian affiliation requirement. The proposal was defeated by a vote of 52% (381 members) opposed to 48% (346 members) in favor of the proposal. The proposal needed a two thirds majority to pass.

On August 3, 2013, another vote was taken to change the membership qualification requirements to include non-Christians. The proposal was again defeated by a vote of 51.85% (364 members) for the change to 48.14% (338 members) opposed to the change. A two-thirds majority is required to pass the amendment.

The Board, led by President Jon Chism, held the belief that Bay View should defend the membership requirements, resulting in an increase in the Association's directors and officers insurance.

In July 2017, The Bay View Chautauqua Inclusiveness Group filed a civil rights and religious discrimination lawsuit against the Bay View Association in the U. S. District Court for the Western District of Michigan.

In May 2019, mediation resulted in an agreement to resolve the controversy. The agreement was implemented on July 18, 2019 by a Consent Order from the U.S. District Court for the Western District of Michigan. There is no longer any religious requirement for membership in the Association or to buy a cottage.

The Consent Order which ended the membership controversy did not restrict the religious program of the Association. As a Chautauqua, the Bay View Association conducts programming in the areas of religion, education, recreation, and the performing arts. The Association employs a Director of Worship and Religious Activities, conducts Sunday worship services, and presents lectures on religious subjects daily during the summer Assembly Season. All elements of all the programs are open to the general public.

The Association's Mission Statement is also not affected by the Court's Order. The mission of the Bay View Association is to be an institution in which Christian values and traditions are central; To enrich the human experience for individuals and families within Bay View and the surrounding community through a seasonal program of religious, educational, cultural and recreational opportunities; And to provide a Christian perspective in a changing world.

In July 2020, Bay View faced backlash from their community for perceived racist activity. Members in support of the Black Lives Matter movement wrote the names of Black victims of police brutality on sidewalks in Bay View as part of the "say their names" campaign. The President of the Board of Trustees ordered the grounds crew to wash away the chalk, and sent an email to members threatening to fine those who chalked the sidewalk. This sparked divisive discourse within the association. Members asked the Board of Trustees to release a statement condemning racism, which the Board ultimately voted against in a 7 - 2 vote.

== See also ==
- List of National Historic Landmarks in Michigan
- National Register of Historic Places listings in Emmet County, Michigan
