= Stafford's Bay View Inn =

Hotel in Bay View, Michigan, USA

Coordinates: 45.38627°N 84.92771°W

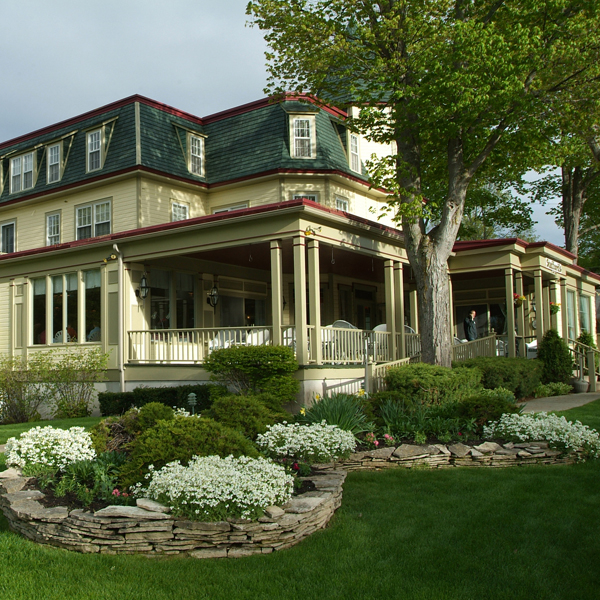
Stafford's Bay View Inn in Bay View, Michigan.

The Stafford’s Bay View Inn is located in Bay View, Michigan, on Little Traverse Bay. The inn is a historical building that has been around for over 120 years as part of the Bay View Association of the Methodist Church established in 1876. It is located on Woodland Avenue directly off U.S. Highway 31 with a Petoskey address.

== History ==
In 1886, John Wesly Howard built the Woodland Avenue House in the rapidly growing Methodist summer community of Bay View. The House was then renamed The Howard House in 1888 after Wesly Howard and served as a summer hotel. During the late 19th century, weekly rates averaged $4.50 for room and board. As the years went by, the property expanded and a various number of proprietors came and went. As the Inn assumed a new owner, it would be renamed accordingly such as The Roselawn, after then late owner, Hiram O. Rose.

The Inn was renamed for the final time in 1935 with today’s title, The Bay View Inn.

In the summer of 1957, Stafford C. Smith first visited the Inn with his aunt for the Inn’s well-known Sunday brunch. He returned each summer through 1960 and worked an assortment of positions under the Inn’s owner, Dr. Roy Heath. During the summer of 1960, Stafford met his future wife, Janice Johnson, who had been hired as a hostess in the dining room.

Stafford, during the following winter of 1960, began to work at the Perry Hotel in Petoskey, Michigan as the new assistant manager. Stafford and Janice were planning a June 17, 1961 wedding, but the Perry Hotel was sold only four months after Stafford had begun his new position, and Stafford lost his job.

Being out of a job with no marriage location, Stafford and Janice devised a plan and soon bought the Bay View Inn, which had recently been put up for sale by Dr. Heath. It is now known as Stafford’s Bay View Inn after the current owner Stafford C. Smith.
