= Hugo Gottesmann =

Austrian musician (1896–1970)

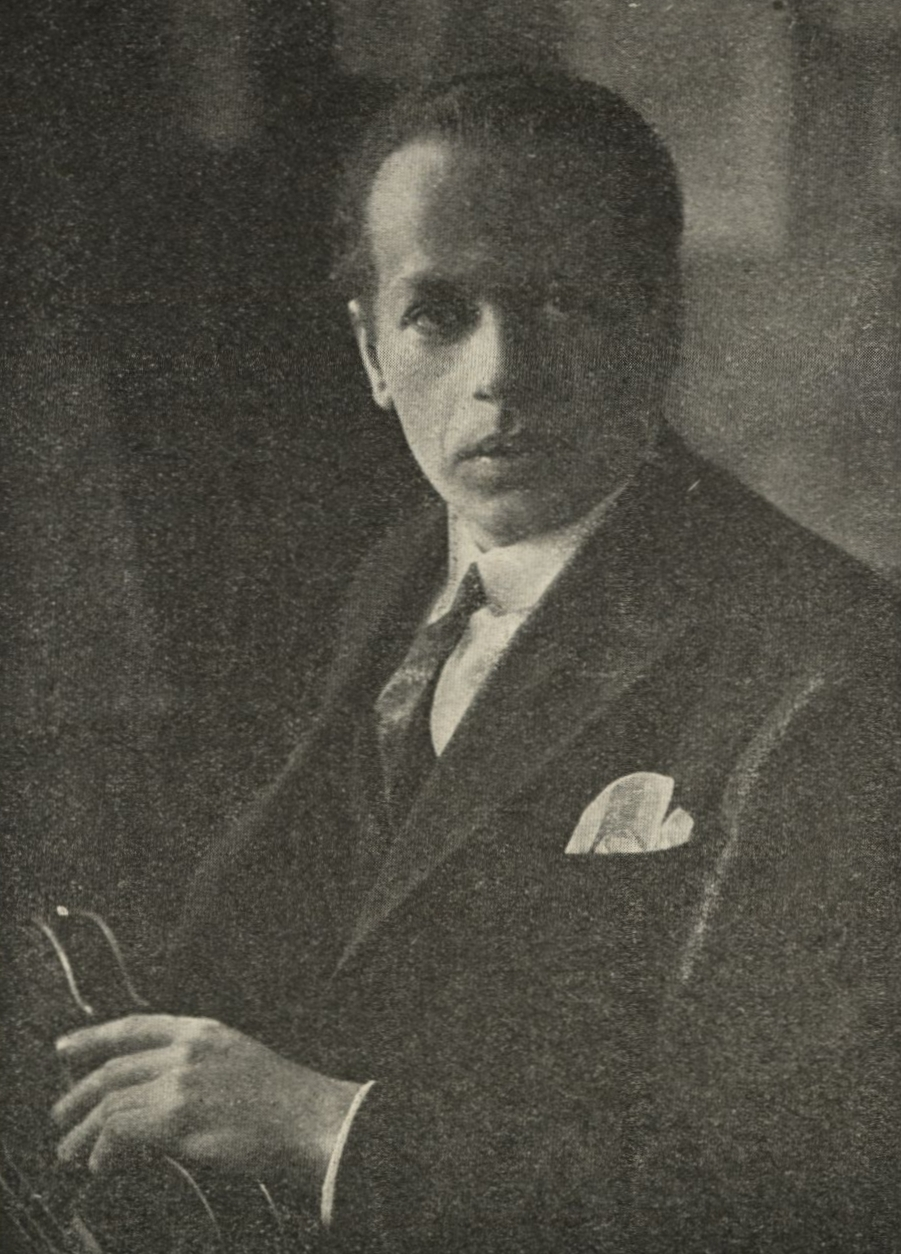
- Occupations: Musician, conductor

Hugo Gottesmann (April 8, 1896 – January 22, 1970) was an Austrian violinist, violist, conductor, and chamber musician. A highly decorated soldier in World War I, his career in Vienna as a conductor and violinist was truncated with the advent of the Third Reich in 1933. He was fired from his positions at Radio Wien, the Vienna Symphony, and the Academie für Musik and forced to seek work elsewhere in Europe and emigrate to the United States.

== Early life ==
Gottesmann was born to Jewish parents Leopold and Anna Greenwald Gottesmann in Leopoldstadt Vienna. He showed musical talent at an early age and was given violin lessons. He was accepted at the University of Music and Performing Arts Vienna and studied with the Czech pedagogue Otakar Ševčík and composer Richard Stöhr. He graduated in 1916 first in his class and was awarded the "Staatspreis".

== Military service ==
Gottesmann was drafted August 23, 1916, into the Austro-Hungarian Army in World War I as a private. He was assigned to the 7th Artillery Regiment and fought on the Eastern Front in Galicia against the Russians or, having entered the war late, possibly on the Italian Front. He rose from private to lieutenant in a few months and received at least four medals, three "in recognition of brave acts in the face of the enemy." He earned the "Silberne Tapferkeitsmedaille II. Kl.' on September 19, 1917. On January 12, 1918, he was awarded the "Karl Truppen Kreuz". He earned the Bronze Signum Landis-Medaille with Crossing Swords on March 20, 1918. He was discharged November 29, 1918, as a lieutenant.

== Das Gottesmann Quartett ==
Upon completion of his military service at the end of World War I, Gottesmann formed the Gottesmann Quartet. Members of the group over the next decade included some of Vienna's finest musicians. Violinist Wilhelm Müller had been a member of the Joachim Quartet. Violists Hugo Kauder and Marcel Dick and cellists Richard Krotschak and Hermann Busch were principals with the Wiener Sinfonie-Orchester. The group toured Belgium, Holland, Poland, Czechoslovakia and Austria. They were featured on the 1925 New Year's Concert. In 1928, for the Schubert Centennial Celebration, they performed the composer's entire string quartet cycle in the courtyard of his "Geburtshaus". They made approximately 182 performances on Radio-Wien from 1925 until 1934. Adolf Busch's biographer Tully Potter referred to the group as "distinguished".

Gottesmann edited Tchaikovsky's Streichquartett No. 2 in D dur op. 22 (Universal) and Streichquartett No 3. in Es Moll op. 30.(Universal).

== Viennese career ==
Gottesmann made his solo debut with the Wiener Tonkünstler Orchestra under Czech Conductor Oskar Nedbal on April 8, 1919, at Vienna's Grosser Konzerthaussaal. He performed Mozart's A Major Concerto, Fantasy for Violin and Orchestra composed for him by Hugo Kauder, and Brahms's Violin Concerto in D major. German violinist Adolf Busch was concertmaster of the orchestra.

Gottesmann became the first concertmaster of the new orchestra when the Tonkünstler-Orchester merged with the Wiener Sinfonie-Orchester in 1922. As concertmaster Gottesmann was the soloist for new works by Karol Szymanowski and Pantscho Wladigeroff and important performances of the Missa Solemnis and St. Matthew Passion under Wilhelm Furtwängler. He also served under conductors George Szell, Richard Strauss. and Bruno Walter. For Vienna's 1927 Beethoven Centennial Celebration, Gottesmann performed Beethoven's Violin Concerto in D major at the Theatre an der Wien where the concerto was premiered in 1806. In 1929, he performed the concerto with the Vienna Philharmonic under conductor Robert Heger on Radio-Wien. Another high point in his career was his performance of Mozart's Violin Concerto in G-major under conductor Bruno Walter.

Gottesmann was a member of the Arnold Schoenberg "Society for Musical Private Performances," Vienna 1918–1922. The Gottesmann Quartet performed Schoenberg's Quartet Nr. 1 D-Minor. Op 7 on February 18, 1921, at the Konzerthaus Mozart-Saal. In 1930, Gottesmann premiered a violin sonata by Josef Matthias Hauer at the International Festival of Contemporary Music in Liège, Belgium. He frequently performed contemporary music as a soloist, with his Gottesmann Quartet and as a conductor. Some of the composers he featured were Hugo Kauder, Julius Chajes, Guido Peters, Karl Weigl, Carl Goldmark, Pantscho Wladigeroff, Ernesta Halffter, Karol Szymanowski, Anton Smareglia, Paul Josef Frankl, Ernest Bloch, Max Reger, Albert Siklos, Karl Rathaus, Christian Sinding, Eugene Goossens, Richard Mandl, Robert Fuchs, Maurice Ramillo Horn, Joseph Marx, Friedrich Wührer, Ludwig Czaczkes, Alfred Freudenhain, Gustav Mahler, Claude Debussy, and Nickolaus Mjaskowsky.

After his performance in the 1927 Beethoven Festival, Gottesmann was appointed conductor of RAVAG or Radio-Wien. He had already been performing on the station for several years. Three days after Radio-Wien began broadcasting, Gottesmann was featured October 4, 1924, with Cellist Hermann Busch and Pianist Otto Schulhof performing Schubert's Piano Trio in B-Dur. Between 1924 and 1938, Gottesmann was heard on Radio-Wien approximately 300 times.

About the same time as his RAVAG appointment, Gottesmann became the permanent Sunday conductor of the Wiener Sinfonie-Orchester at Vienna's Musikverein Golden Hall. In January 1932, he conducted the Wiener Sinfonie-Orchester, the Vienna State Opera chorus and soloists in Beethoven's Ninth Symphony at the Grosser Konzerthaus-Saal. Three months later he conducted the opening concert of the 200th Anniversary of Haydn's birth at Redouten Hall in the Hofburg Palace. He conducted the summer symphony concerts in Gôteborg, Sweden in 1934 and 1935 and was featured several times as guest conductor with the Augusteo Orchestra (Orchestra dell'Accademia Nazionale di Santa Cecilia) in Rome before and after World War II. In the United States in 1942 and 1943, he conducted the North American tour of the Ballet Russe de Monte Carlo.

Gottesmann was asked to join the faculty of his alma mater, the Akademie für Musik, in 1920, four years after graduation. He taught violin and chamber music, and was an exceptional teacher. He applied for the "Title of Professor". On September 21, 1926, his request was denied by a vote of three (Hofmann, Franz Schmidt, Alexander Wunderer) to two (Joseph Marx, Karl Geiringer). Five days later on September 26, 1926, in Linz, Austria, the State of Austria conferred on Gottesmann the "Title of Professor". It is the only known case where the State of Austria overruled an academy decision. Gottesmann is always referred to as Professor in references prior to 1938. During the academic year of 1925 and 1926, the Akademie für Musik und darstellende Kunst offered "Volkstümliche Kurse" which were public courses in which the instructors received a percentage of the course fees. Gottesmann taught at least one of these classes.

A 1970 news-release from the City of Vienna stated that Gottesmann "was a gifted artist, who was a decisive influence on the musical life in Vienna..."

== Career in the United States ==
In 1933, Gottesmann was fired from all of his positions: as conductor at Radio-Wien; as professor at the Akademie für Musik; and his lifetime contract as concertmaster and conductor with the Wiener Sinfonie-Orchester. One reason given for this action was the patronage of the Gottesmann Quartet and the Wiener Sinfonie-Orchester by Hugo Breitner, Austria's unpopular Counselor of Finance (1919-1932). Breitner, known as the architect of Red Vienna, had instituted a progressive luxury tax on the propertied class to provide housing for the poor. Gottesmann took legal action but there is no known documentation of a settlement. Another reason given for the firing was his Jewish ethnicity. Gottesmann accepted conducting opportunities with the Gôteborg Summer Orchestra in Sweden and the Augusteo Orchestra in Rome. In 1936 he immigrated to the United States.

In New York, Gottesmann performed regularly on WQXR-FM. He freelanced with various orchestras such as the Leopold Stokowski Orchestra. He led the second violin section of the Busch Chamber Players and Little Symphony.

In 1942, Gottesmann replaced Robert Mann on the faculty of the Bay View Summer College of Liberal Arts in Bay View, Michigan, now known as the Bay View Music Festival. The school was connected with Albion College. Gottesmann taught violin and performed as soloist and leader of the string quartet. Daniel Majeske studied with Gottesmann in 1948-9 before joining the Cleveland Orchestra in 1955 where he served as Concertmaster from 1969-1993. Peter Sparling, leading dancer with Martha Graham and Distinguished Professor at U-M, was another student of Gottemann in Bay View. Gottesmann remained with the festival 28 years until his death. In 1946, Adolf Busch asked Gottesmann to join the Busch Quartet as violist. For the next six years, he performed in New York and toured the British Isles, Europe, and South America with the group. Beside concert appearances, he made recordings and performed radio broadcasts. The recording of Beethoven's String Quartet Op.59, No. 3. he made with the group in 1951 was awarded the Deutscher Schallplattenpreis when it was re-released November 1, 1998. Author Tully Potter states that the high quality of Gottesmann's playing can be assessed from the 1949 recording of Brahms' String Quartet No. 3 in B♭ major, Op. 67. The 1949 recording of Brahms' Piano Quartet in G minor. Op.25 with Adolf Busch, Hermann Busch, Hugo Gottesmann, and Rudolf Serkin is highly regarded.

When Adolf Busch's death forced the Busch Quartet to disband in 1952, Igor Buketoff offered Gottesmann the concertmaster position of the Fort Wayne Philharmonic. During Gottesmann's Fort Wayne tenure, Yehudi Menuhin, Nathan Milstein, Isaac Stern and Rudolf Serkin soloed with the orchestra. Gottesmann also conducted ballet performances and led the string quartet.

== Death ==
Gottesmann was diagnosed with stomach cancer in 1951. The cancer was arrested and Gottesmann resumed his career. In 1969, he was again diagnosed with stomach cancer and died January 22, 1970, in Fort Wayne, Indiana.

== Compositions written for Gottesmann ==
For Gottesmann's debut, Hugo Kauder dedicated to the violinist his Sonate für Violine und Klavier in 1919. He also composed his Sonata in G minor for Violin and String Quartet for Gottesmann. in 1923, and his Zwei kleine Sonaten für Violine in 1933. Josef Matthias Hauer (1883-1959) composed his Stücke für Violine und Klavier Op. 41 for Professor Gottesmann now in the collection of the Austrian National Library. Eduard Frank, violinist with the Vienna Philharmonic and later Holocaust victim, composed the Gottesmann-Serenade in 1929 for his friend. Composer Richard Stöhr dedicated his String Quartet E Minor Op. 114 to Gottesmann in the 1940s. Later Adolf Busch composed Prelude and Fugato for Solo Viola for Gottesmann's 52nd birthday.

Gottesmann played a Carlo Ferdinando Landolfi violin. In the Busch Quartet, he performed on a small Domenico Busan viola which Rudolf Serkin borrowed from Austrian collector Elisabeth Bondy, widow of Oskar Bondy.
