= The Wonder Book of Bible Stories =

1904 book by Logan Marshall

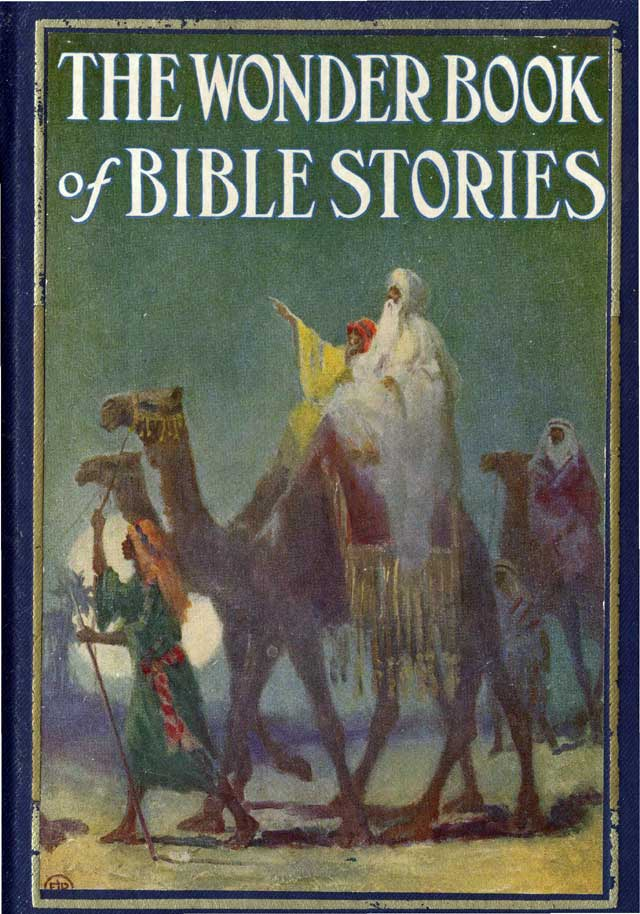
- Author: Logan Marshall
- Subject: Bible stories
- Publication date: 1904
- Media type: Print
- OCLC: 2904402
- Dewey Decimal: 220.9505
- LC Class: BS551

The Wonder Book of Bible Stories is a 1904 collection by Logan Marshall published in the United States. The book includes biblical stories from both the Old and New Testaments retold for children and illustrated with rich woodcuts and color plates. Reprinted several times in the 1920s, it went out of print in 1925. It was made available online by Project Gutenberg in 2005 and there have subsequently been several print editions in Chinese and in English, published in Taipei, as well as other ebook versions.

Other collections of Bible stories with this title have been made by Mary Juergens (1951), David Kyles (1953) and Jesse Lyman Hurlbut (1958).
