= Logan Marshall =

American writer (1883–1937)

Logan Howard Smith
- Born: November 18, 1883; Germantown, Philadelphia, Pennsylvania, U.S.
- Died: September 22, 1937 (aged 53)
- Resting place: Laurel Hill Cemetery
- Spouse: Amelia Sparks Douglas

Logan Marshall (November 18, 1883 – September 22, 1937) was the pen name of Logan Howard-Smith of Germantown, Philadelphia, Pennsylvania. He was the son of Robert Spurrier and Elizabeth (McKinney) Howard-Smith. The father was an executive of Link-Belt.

Howard-Smith attended the University of Pennsylvania and graduated in 1905. Upon graduation he took a position as assistant editor at The John C. Winston Co., a publishing firm. Winston was later acquired by Henry Holt and became part of Holt, Rinehart & Winston. At Winston, Howard-Smith both edited and wrote a large number of books, mainly under the pen name Logan Marshall. These were often quickly produced and designed to satisfy public curiosity concerning a current event. As a result, Howard-Smith has been characterized as a "hack", and his language criticized as "strained, excessive, or melodramatic." Howard-Smith's (as Logan Marshall) The Sinking of the Titanic and Great Sea Disasters, however, achieved a great deal of fame as a result of being quickly at the market, and continues to be cited in bibliographies about the incident.

Logan Howard-Smith married Amelia Sparks Douglas on April 22, 1917. He died at age 53 on September 22, 1937, and is buried at Laurel Hill Cemetery in Philadelphia, Section J, Plot 182 & 184 N Part.

== Works ==
=== Written as Logan Marshall ===
- The Universal Handbook of Necessary Information for Home, School and Office, Practically Arranged for Ready Reference. Ed. Logan Marshall (1910)
- Life of Theodore Roosevelt (1910)
- The Sinking of the Titanic and Great Sea Disasters (1912)
- The True Story of Our National Calamity of Flood, Fire, and Tornado (c1913)
- The Story of the Panama Canal (1913)
- The Story of Polar Conquest: The Complete History of Arctic and Antarctic Exploration, including the Discovery of the South Pole by Amundsen and Scott; the Tragic Fate of the Scott Expedition and the Discovery of the North Pole by Admiral Peary (1913)
- The Tragic Story of the Empress of Ireland (1914)
- Myths and Legends of All Nations: Famous Stories from the Greek, German, English, Spanish, Scandinavian, Danish, French, Russian, Bohemian, Italian and Other Sources. Tr. and ed. by Logan Marshall (1914)
- The Story of Europe and the Nations at War: A Graphic Narrative of the Nations Involved in the Great War, Their History and Former Wars, Their Rulers and Leaders, Their Armies and Navies, Their Tesources, the Reasons for Conflict and the Issues at Stake (1914)
- Horrors and Atrocities of the Great War (c. 1915)
- Seeing America, including the Panama expositions: A Descriptive and Picturesque Journey Through Romantic and Historic Cities and Places, Natural Wonders, Scenic Marvels of National Pride and Interest (c1915)
- Paul Georg Munch, Hindenburg’s March into London Translated from the German original. Ed. Logan Marshall (1916)
- Mother Goose and Favorite Fairy Tales Edited and arranged by Logan Marshall (1917)
- The Wonder Book of Bible Stories Edited and arranged by Logan Marshall (1925)
- Swedish American Handbook. Ed. Logan Marshall
- Famous Tales of Fact and Fancy
- A History of Nations and Empires

=== Written as Logan Howard-Smith ===
- Good Times at Home: a Library of Entertainment, Instruction and Amusement, Embracing Seven Instructive Books in One Volume: Book I. Fireside Gems from Our Popular Poets ... Book II. The Model Speaker and Reciter ... Book III. Games, Amusements and Sports ... Book IV. The Songs We Love to Sing ... Book V. The Home Book of Etiquette ... Book VI. Wonderful and Remarkable Things and Facts ... Book VII. Biography and Anecdote of the Great ... Ed. by Logan Howard-Smith (1909)
- The History of Battery A (formerly known as the Keystone Battery) by Logan Howard-Smith and J. F. Reynolds Scott (1912)
- The National Encyclopedia: A Compendium of Information and Instruction on All Subjects, for Home, School and Office (1915)
- Thrilling Stories of the Great War: Heroic Incidents and Startling Events of the World War on Land and Sea, in the Air and Under the Water (1916)
- Earl Kitchener and the Great War

== See also ==
- Titanic in popular culture
