= Mary Canberg =

American musician (1918–2004)

Mary Canberg (1918 – 15 June 2004) was an American violinist, conductor, and music educator.

Canberg was born in Grand Rapids, Michigan. She studied with Michael Press and Hans Letz at the Juilliard School in New York City and made her professional debut in a recital at Town Hall on 31 January 1947. She gave several more recitals in New York during the late 1940s through the 1950s and performed in a string quartet with John Corigliano, Sr. and Martin Ormandy, both of whom had long associations with the New York Philharmonic. Canberg also worked frequently with lauded organist Clarence Dickinson (1873–1969) for music at the Brick Presbyterian Church on Park Avenue during this time. Working closely with the fledgling Clarkstown Recreation Commission and its founder Commissioner James Vincent Damiani Sr., she founded the Rockland County Youth String Orchestra in 1964, which she conducted for many years. The Rockland County Youth String Orchestra had its opening performance on Friday, April 24, 1964, at Nanuet JR.-SR. High School Auditorium with an encore at Clarkstown SR. High School on April 26, 1964, sponsored by the Clarkstown Recreation Commission. She also taught music to many students, a number of which have gone on to have highly successful performing careers, including cellist Ronald Thomas and violinists Joseph Lin and James Buswell. She died in West Nyack, New York.
