= James Buswell =

American violinist and conductor (1946–2021)

James Oliver Buswell IV
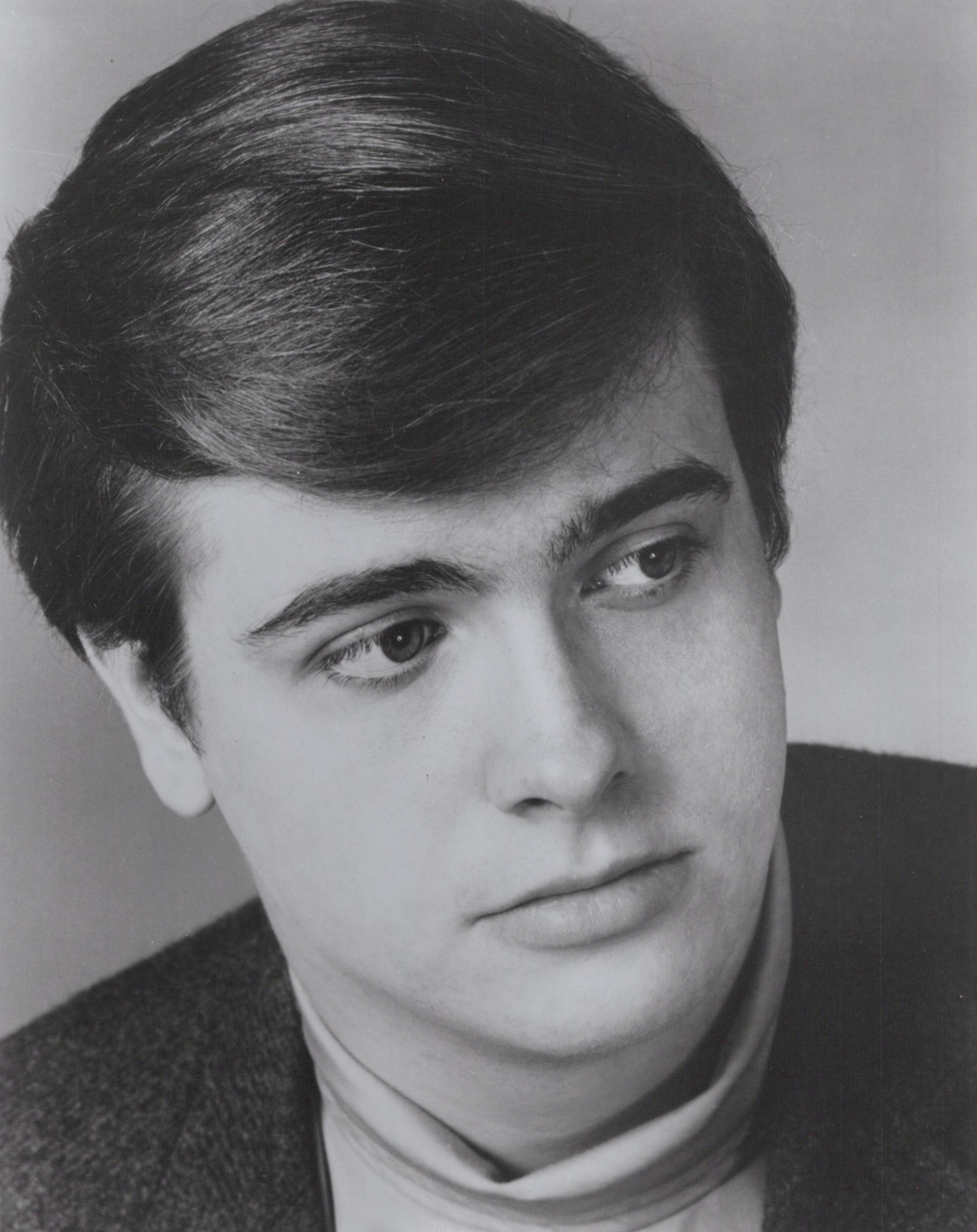
- Buswell in 1969
- Born: December 4, 1946; Fort Wayne, Indiana, US
- Died: September 28, 2021 (aged 74); Boston, Massachusetts, US
- Occupations: Violinist; Chamber musician; Conductor

James Oliver Buswell IV (December 4, 1946 – September 28, 2021) was an American violinist, chamber musician, conductor and educator.

== Biography ==
Buswell learned violin at age five. His solo debut took place with the New York Philharmonic at the age of seven. When he was 18, he appeared as soloist on one of the New York Philharmonic's Young People's Concerts performing Mendelssohn's Violin Concerto in E minor with Leonard Bernstein conducting. This performance was televised and shown throughout the United States. He later studied with Mary Canberg, Paul Stassevich, and Ivan Galamian at the Juilliard School and was a graduate of Harvard University.

He was also a Grammy nominated recording artist for the Barber Violin Concerto with the Royal Scottish National Orchestra.

Buswell was on the faculties of University of Arizona, Indiana University School of Music (1973–1986) and the New England Conservatory (1987–2014). Most recently, he was on the faculty of the Steinhardt School of Culture, Education, and Human Development at New York University with his wife, cellist Carol Ou.

He had four children (Anna Buswell, William Buswell, Joshua Buswell, and Rachel English) and four grandchildren.

James died September 28, 2021, in Boston.
