= Joseph Press =

Russian cellist

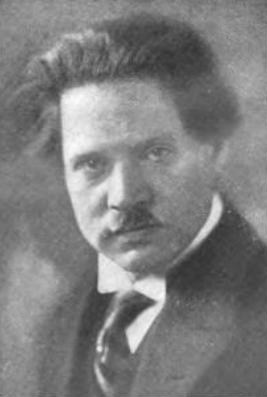
- Born: Josef Isaakovitch Press; 1882 or 1883; Vilnius, Russian Empire
- Died: October 4, 1924 (aged 41); Rochester, New York, US
- Education: Moscow Conservatory
- Occupation: Cellist
- Relatives: Michael Press (brother)

Josef Isaakovitch Press (Russian: Иосиф Исаакович Пресс; 1882 or 1883 – October 4, 1924) was a Russian-American cellist.

== Biography ==
Joseph Press was born in Vilnius in 1882 or 1883. He won a gold prize scholarship to the Moscow Conservatory. After graduating, he performed as a soloist, and became head of the cello department at the Petrograd Conservatory.

He performed in the concerts of the Society for Jewish Folk Music which also featured violinists Jascha Heifetz and Efrem Zimbalist the bass Feodor Chaliapin. In 1921, he emigrated to America with his brother, Michael Press.

He began teaching at the Eastman School of Music in 1922. He died of pneumonia in Rochester, New York on October 4, 1924.
