= Felix Petyrek =

Austrian composer

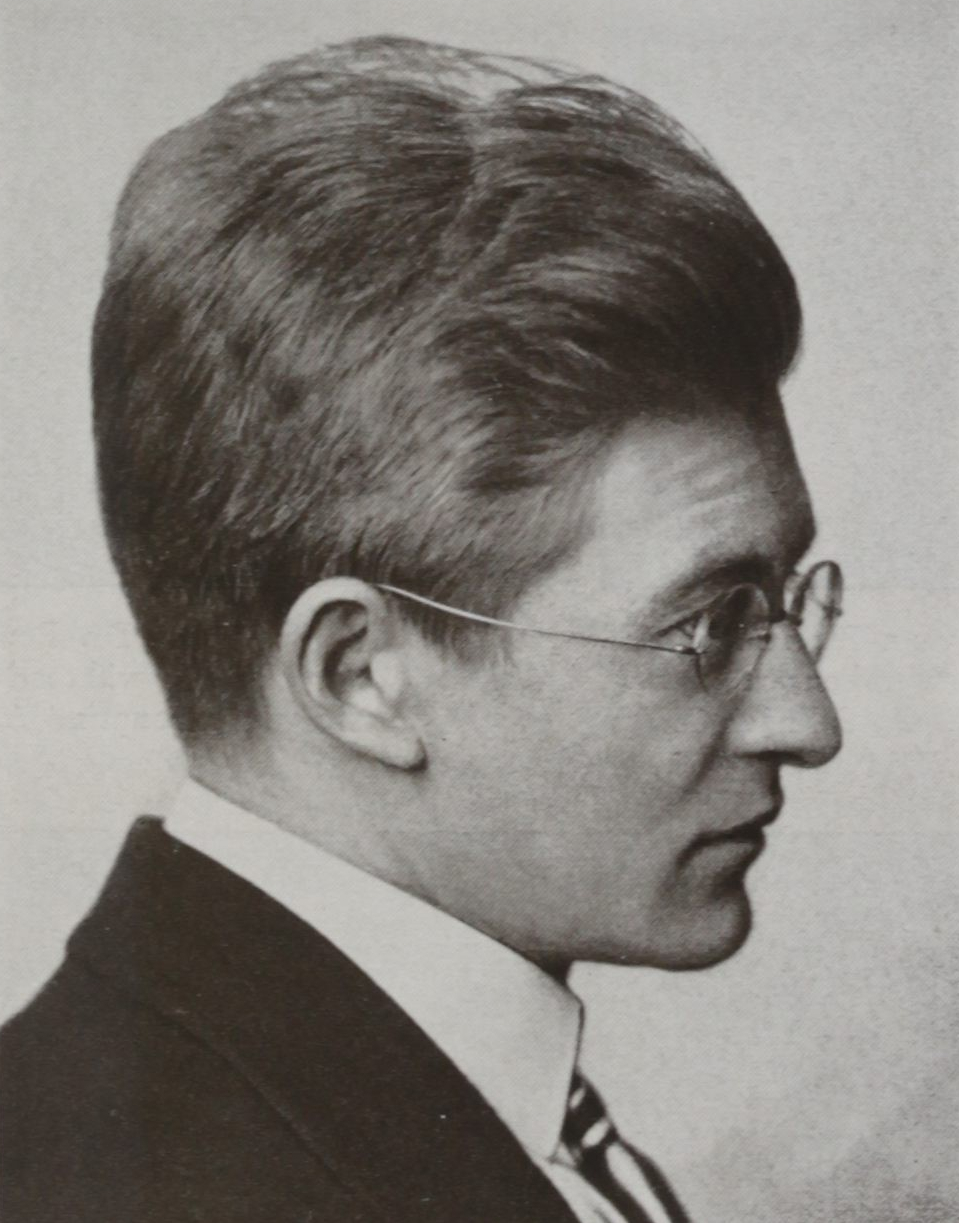
Felix Petyrek

Felix Petyrek (14 May 1892 in Brno – 1 December 1951 in Vienna) was an Austrian composer. He wrote stage works, songs, piano music (including duos and duets) in a Romantic style.

Petyrek was a pupil of Franz Schreker and Guido Adler in Vienna. During World War 1. for health reasons Petyrek was not moved to the front, but had to care at St. Andrä camp of prisoners of war. There he collected songs of the prisoners coming from many nations. Together with Bernhard Paumgartner, he worked at the center of music history at the Imperial War Ministry. From 1919 Petyrek taught at the Mozarteum. After Petyrek had lived for health reasons three years in Abbazia, he went in 1926 to the Athens Conservatoire, where he led the master class for piano and also worked as a lecturer of musicology. At the same time he gave lectures and published in professional journals, much of them in Greek. Later he taught at the music conservatories in Stuttgart and Leipzig.

Petyrek was a member of the November Group.
