= Hugo Kauder =

Austrian composer, pedagogue, and music theorist

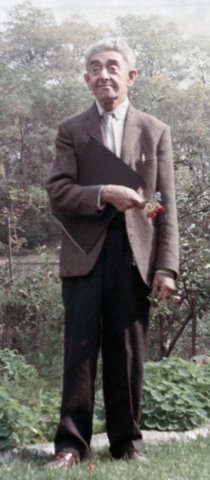
Kauder in 1965

Hugo Kauder (9 June 1888 – 22 July 1972) was an Austrian-Jewish composer, music theorist, and teacher. He composed in a relatively traditional, Brahmsian contrapuntal–harmonic manner with substantial modal mixture.

Kauder sought a synthesis of sound and word in his vocal music and was attentive to texts, praising the word painting of Schoenberg's Op. 15 Stefan George settings. He was close to Rudolph Pannwitz, who wrote aphorisms and was influenced by George and Friedrich Nietzsche.

He wrote over 300 works. A society (2002) and performance competition (2003) were founded in his name.

== Biography ==
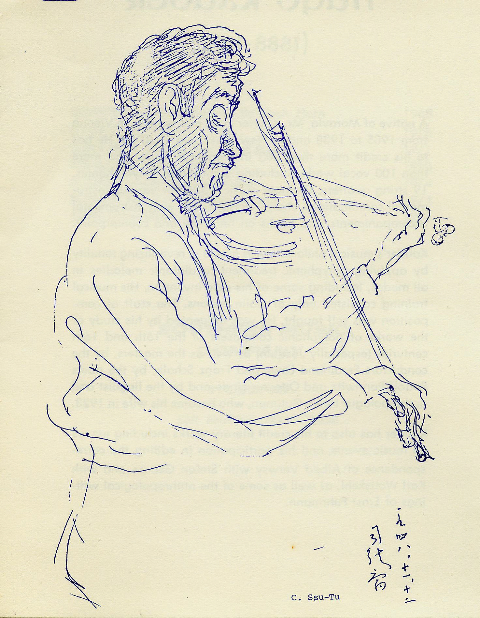
Drawing of Hugo Kauder by C. Ssu-Tu, 1948

Kauder was born in Tovačov. His father Ignaz was Oberlehrer (principal) of the local German language primary school. The local violin teacher gave the boy Kauder lessons. This was his only formal training in music.

In 1905, Kauder moved to Vienna to study engineering. He often skipped school with Egon Lustgarten to study scores in the Imperial Court Library. Several volumes of Guido Adler's Denkmäler der Tonkunst in Österreich, a compendium of music including that of the Franco-Flemish School, especially interested him. He cited Josquin des Prez as a "teacher".

From 1911 to 1917, Kauder played violin in the Wiener Tonkünstler-Orchester under Ferdinand Loewe, Franz Schalk, Arthur Nikisch, and Richard Strauss. So began a lifelong friendship with Dutch hornist Willem Valkenier (1887–1986), which inspired many horn compositions. From 1917 to 1922, Kauder was the violist of the Gottesmann Quartet.

He was a member of Arnold Schoenberg's Society for Private Musical Performances, to which he referred (perhaps skeptically) as "our club" in a 1918 letter to Alban Berg. He mentioned practicing Karl Weigl's String Quartet No. 1 on viola d'amore for a Feb. 1919 concert. At a Nov. 1919 concert, he played in Igor Stravinsky's Pribaoutki, Schoenberg conducting.

Kauder met poet and philosopher Rudolph Pannwitz at Bad Gastein in Dec. 1919, who he came to regard as a mentor. Pannwitz did not play an instrument but composed settings of classic poems. He believed, somewhat unconventionally, that composers should find and reveal the music latent in texts rather than creating the musical setting at will. Kauder took and expanded this approach in his vocal music.

At the first "Internationalen Kammermusiktage" (Note: International Chamber Music Days) in Salzburg (1922), Kauder stood photographed with Lustgarten and many of their contemporaries. (Note: Among these were Karl Alwin, Karl Weigl, Wilhelm Grosz, Arthur Bliss, Paul Hindemith, Karl Horwitz, Willem Pijper, Paul Amadeus Pisk, Rudolf Réti, Ethel Smyth, Anton Webern, and Egon Wellesz.) There César Saerchinger advocated for "Weltmusiktage", and Rudolf Réti and Egon Wellesz founded the Internationalen Gesellschaft für Neue Musik at the Café Bazar. Kauder's 1916 Nachts, three movements for viola, cello, and piano, was performed as part of a concert program on the topic of night. In Anbruch, Lustgarten highlighted Kauder's independence of any school of composition.

In 1923 Kauder married Lustgarten's cousin Helene Guttman (1898–1949), a linguist, archeologist, and bible scholar.

For the rest of his life, in Vienna and later in New York City, Kauder composed and privately taught violin, music theory, and composition. He conducted a chorus and a chamber ensemble of friends and students, including his son Otto. They studied and performed classics as well as Kauder's own music. Karin Wagner emphasized the influence of Beethoven, Brahms, and Mahler on Kauder's music.

== Reception ==
Many notable musicians appreciated and performed Kauder's music in pre-Anschluss (and to some extent post-World War II) Vienna. Conductors included Viktor Bermeiser, Siegmund Levarie, Josef Mertin, Karl Ristenpart, and Alexander Zemlinsky. Among string quartets were the Gottesmann Quartet, Kolbe Quartet, (Note: The Kolbe Quartet comprised four young women. They were led by Margarete Kolbe.) Rosé Quartet, and Sedlak-Winkler Quartet. Pianists included Adolf Baller and Friedrich Wührer. Various others did also, among them Alphons Jansen (cello), Ernst Paul (horn), and Alexander Wunderer (oboe).

The Hugo Kauder Society was founded (2002) in New Haven. Its mission is to foster awareness and appreciation of the composer, and to provide opportunities to emerging musicians to perform (and sometimes premiere) his music. In 2003, the society established an international music competition in Kauder's name. Among the winners were the Euclid Quartet (2004) and oboist Ivan Danko (2009).

The Euclid Quartet recorded his four string quartets for Centaur Records (Cat. No. 2840, released 2007). A Slovakia-based trio in Kauder's name recorded his 1916 trio and others' chamber music for oboe (Ivan Danko), viola (Robert Lakatos), and piano (Ladislav Fanzowitz) for Pavlik Records in 2010. Karen Bentley Pollick and Daniel Glover have recorded his four string sonatas, written between 1913 and 1920.
