= Ludwig Czaczkes =

Austrian composer, musicologist and pianist

Ludwig Czaczkes (12 September 1898 – 4 August 1992) was an Austrian composer, musicologist and pianist. He is known for his studies on the music of J. S. Bach.

Ludwig Czaczkes was born and raised in Vienna. He studied music at the Academy of Music and the Performing Arts in 1912–1916, fought at World War I in 1916–1918 and continued his studies after the war. His teachers included Emil Sauer (piano), Ferdinand Löwe (conducting) and Josef Marx (composition). He also studied musicology at University of Vienna with Guido Adler and performed as pianist. From 1923 to 1931 he taught at the Academy of Music.

As Czaczkes was Jewish, he chose to emigrate to Turkey in 1937 and taught at Ankara Conservatory till 1949. He then returned to his native land and served as a professor at the Academy.

Czaczkes’ best-known theoretical work is his two-volume study Analyse des Wohltemperierten Klaviers: Form und Aufbau der Fuge bei Bach (1956) on The Well-Tempered Clavier.

Czaczkes died in Vienna in 1992, aged 93.

== Sources ==
- Blumesberger, Susanne (ed.): Handbuch österreichischer Autorinnen und Autoren jüdischer Herkunft: 18. bis 20. Jahrhundert, p. 207. K. G. Saur Verlag, München 2002. ISBN 3-598-11545-8
