= Court Street Methodist Church =

Historic church in Wisconsin, United States

- U.S. National Register of Historic Places
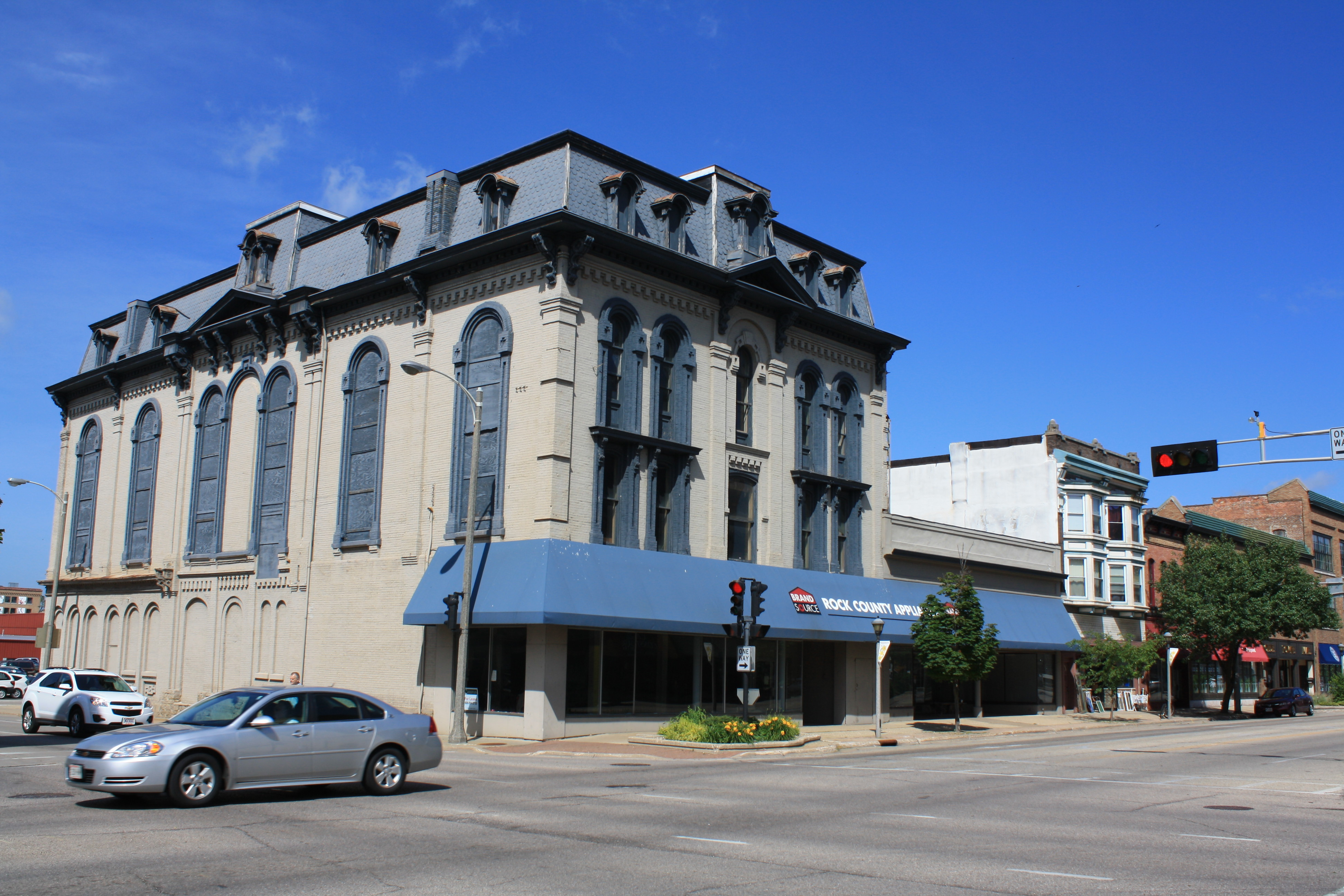

- Location within Wisconsin Location within the United States
- Location: 36 S. Main St., Janesville, Wisconsin
- Coordinates: 42°40′55″N 89°1′17″W
- Area: 0.207 acres (0.084 ha)
- Built: 1868, 1905-06
- Architectural style: Second Empire
- NRHP reference No.: 77000045
- Added to NRHP: November 17, 1977

Court Street Methodist Church, which for a time also was known as Rock County Appliance and TV, is a historic church at 36 S. Main Street in Janesville, Wisconsin, United States. It was built in 1868 and was renovated by Masonic organization during 1905–1906. It was added to the National Register of Historic Places in 1977.

It is 50 by 138 feet (15 m × 42 m) in plan, designed in a restrained Second Empire style.
