= Jesse Lyman Hurlbut =

American Methodist Episcopal clergyman and author (1843–1930)

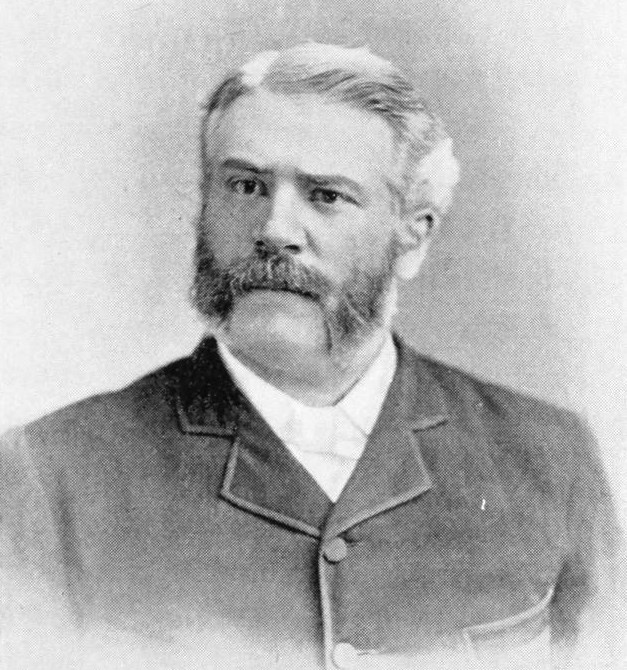
- Hurlbut circa 1917

Personal life
- Born: February 18, 1843 New York City, New York, U.S.
- Died: August 21, 1930 (aged 87) South Orange, New Jersey, U.S.
- Education: Wesleyan University

Religious life
- Religion: Methodism
- Denomination: Methodist Episcopal Church
- Profession: Minister, author

Jesse Lyman Hurlbut (February 15, 1843 –1930) was an American clergyman of the Methodist Episcopal Church. He was born in New York City, graduated at Wesleyan University in 1864, and held pastorates at Newark, Montclair, Paterson, Plainfield, Hoboken, Morristown, Orange, and Bloomfield, all in New Jersey. After 1879 he was connected with the Sunday-school and tract work of his denomination. He was secretary of the Epworth League in 1889–1892 and for some time was associated with J. H. Vincent in the direction of the Chautauqua Literary and Scientific Circle. From 1909 until his retirement in 1914 he was District Superintendent of the Newark District.

== Selected works ==
- Manual of Biblical Geography (1882)
- Outlines in Old Testament History (1890)
- Our Church (1902)
- Story of the Bible (1905)
- Outline Studies in the New Testament (1906)
- Teacher Training Lessons (1908)
- Organizing and Building up the Sunday School (1909)
- Traveling in the Holy Land through the Stereoscope (1913)
- The Superintendent's Helper (1915)
- Life of Christ for Young and Old (1915)
- The Story of Chautauqua (1921)
- An Introduction to the John C. Winston Company's 1909 edition of John Bunyan's Pilgrim's Progress - a version revised for younger readers.
