= Mikhail Press =

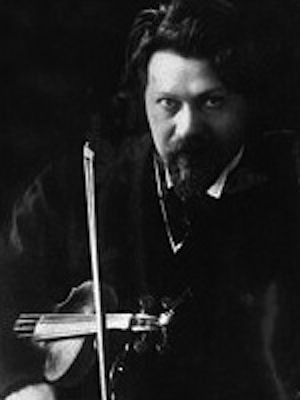
Mikhail Press

Mikhail (Moisej) Isaakovich Press, also known as Michael Press, (Russian: Михаил Исаакович Пресс; 29 August 1871, in Vilnius, Lithuania – 22 December 1938, in Lansing, Michigan) was a Russian-American violinist, conductor and music educator.

Press began studying violin with Tissen at the age of eight in Vilnius, and made his first public appearance at ten years old. At the age of thirteen he was concert master in the Vilna Opera House. For some years he was conductor of the Karatayev Opera Company, travelling all over Russia.

Press entered the Moscow Conservatory in 1897 studying violin with Jan Hřímalý and graduated with a gold medal in 1899. From 1901 to 1904 he was professor at the Philharmonic Society Conservatory in Moscow. Press played in chamber music ensembles and in 1905 organized the Russian Trio, a piano trio which also included his wife Vera Maurina as pianist (graduate of Moscow Conservatory), and his brother Joseph Press (Иосиф Пресс, 1881–1924), a gifted cellist.

From 1915 to 1918, Press taught at the Moscow Conservatory, succeeding Hřímalý as Professor of Violin. He narrowly escaped execution during the Russian Revolution and fled to Germany and Gothenburg, Sweden where he conducted the Gothenburg Symphony for two years.

Press migrated to the United States and made his debut in 1922. He joined the violin faculty of the Curtis Institute of Music in 1924 and served as Carl Flesch's assistant for one year. In the 1920s, he was a member of the Old Masters Trio with cellist Leo Schulz. He taught at Michigan State College in East Lansing, Michigan from 1928–1938. During summers of 1935 until 1938, Press was a member of the music faculty at the Bay View Association, Bay View, Michigan, as a teacher, soloist, and chamber musician. Press was also a composer and conductor. He was guest conductor with the Philadelphia Orchestra and Boston Symphony Orchestra, among others.

Among Press' students were Vadim Borisovsky, Dorothy DeLay and Mary Canberg.

== Discography ==
- Johan Halvorsen: Passacaglia on a Theme of Handel – The Dawn of Recording: The Julius Block Cylinders; Michael Press (violin), Joseph Press (cello); Marston Records C198
