= Strathmore, Syracuse =

- Strathmore "By the Park" Subdivision
- U.S. National Register of Historic Places
- U.S. Historic district
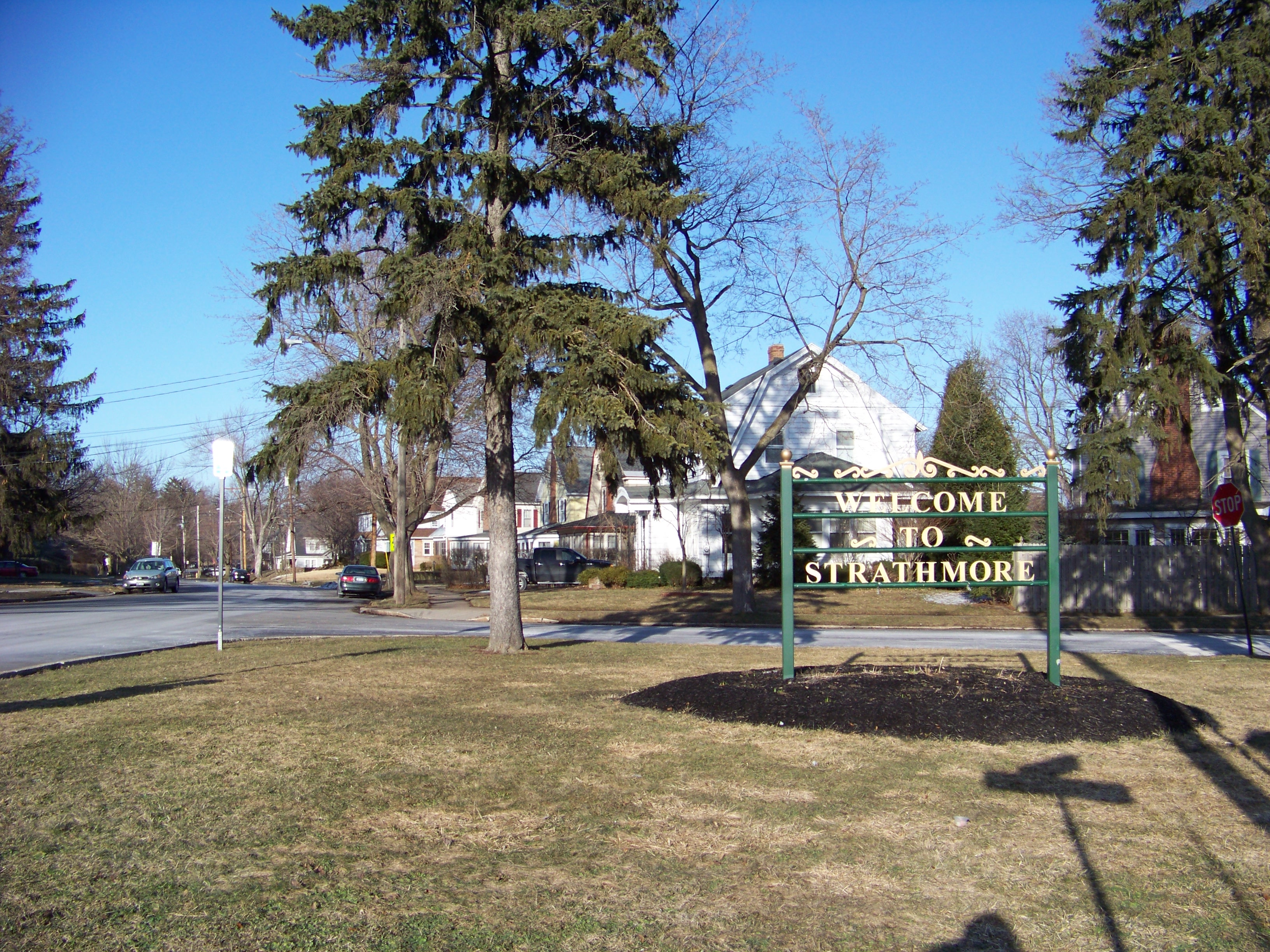

- Location within New York Location within the United States
- Location: Glenwood, S. Geddes, Wellesley, Twin Hills, Strathmore, Arden, Alanson, Charmouth, Robineau, Syracuse, New York
- Coordinates: 43°1′16″N 76°10′19″W
- Built: 1919
- Architect: Ward Wellington Ward; et al.
- Architectural style: Colonial Revival
- MPS: Historic Designed Landscapes of Syracuse MPS
- NRHP reference No.: 06000564
- Added to NRHP: July 12, 2006

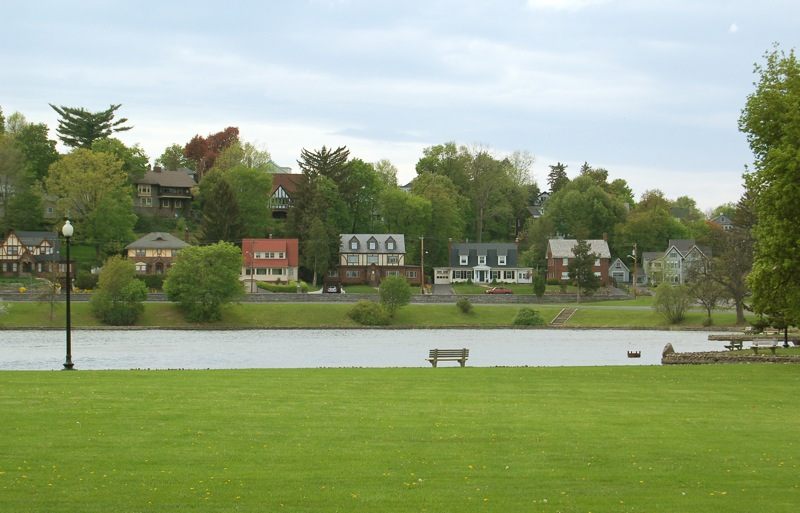
Strathmore houses around Onondaga Park

Onondaga Park

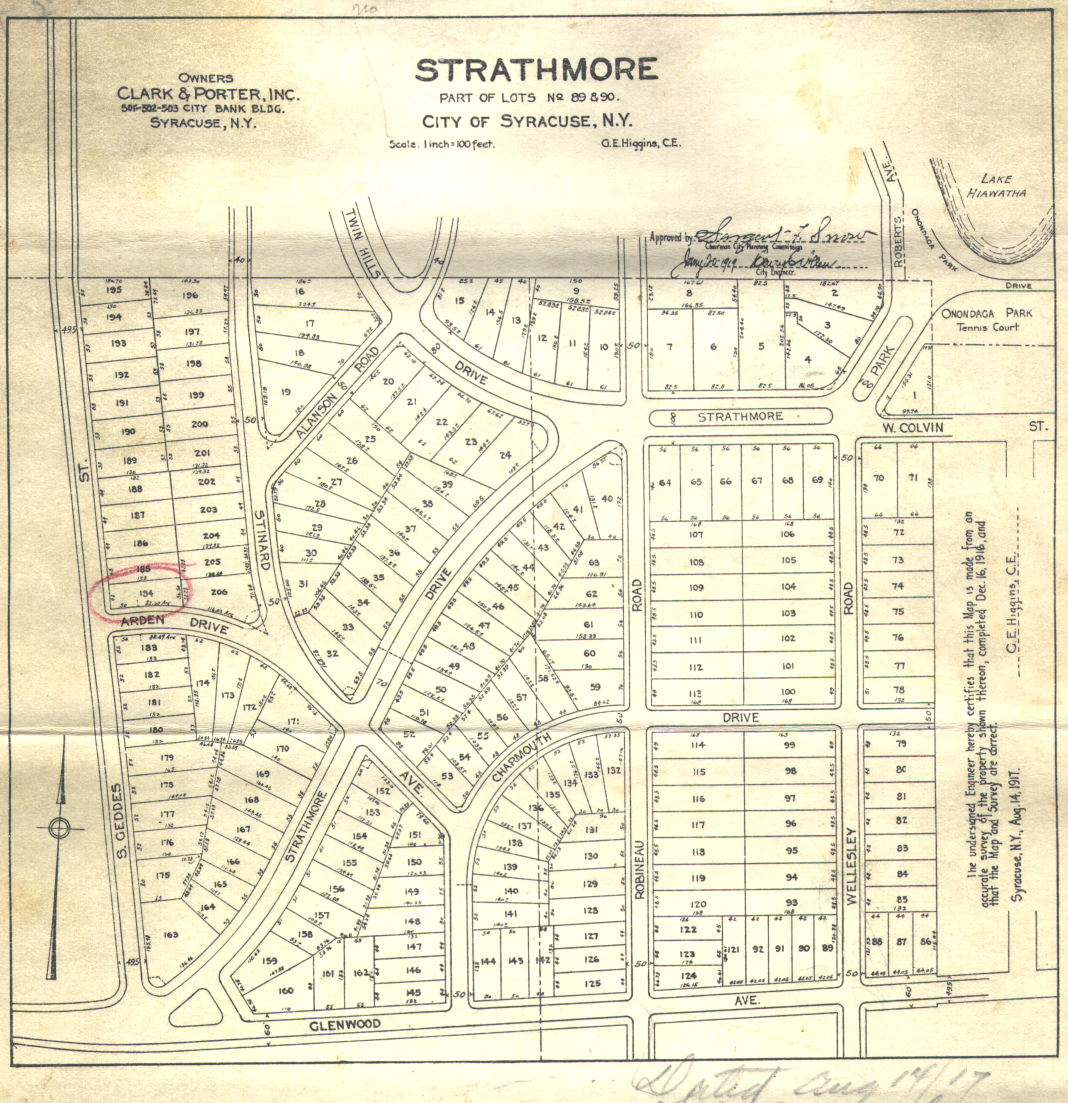
Original Strathmore Neighborhood Layout of Lots

Strathmore, or Strathmore "By the Park" Subdivision, is a neighborhood in the southwest of Syracuse, New York, United States. It is a mostly residential neighborhood that has many houses from the early and middle of the twentieth century.

== History ==
The subdivision was planned by 1917 and developed in 1919 by Clark & Porter, Inc. Marketing materials stated "...no smoke, no dirt, no fogs, no two-family or apartment houses, no business places of any kind, nothing but homes." An extension of the middle class and upper middle class Summit Avenue residential neighborhood on the other side of Onondaga Park and Hiawatha Lake, Strathmore was marketed as "an exclusive residential district" when it officially opened on September 27, 1919. It attracted solidly middle class and upper middle class residents into various enclaves such as Robineau Road. The original advertisement flyer proclaimed "There can be no cheap homes in Strathmore by the Park", referring to Onondaga Park. Strathmore was zoned strictly residential, allowing for only single-family and two-family homes with a garage. It also contains many rental properties in the "less greater" section past Summit Ave.

Today, the neighborhood remains desirable and attracts a diverse, solidly middle and upper middle class population of white collar, academic, and creative class professionals. Strathmore is characterized by its Garden City town planning principles, bucolic tree-lined streets, and residential architecture of well-built Colonial Revival, Georgian, Federal, Norman French, Tudor, and Arts and Crafts style homes. During the annual Strathmore House Tour, five renovated houses are open to the public. In 1987, Onondaga Park became an official Syracuse Historic Preservation District.

It was added to the National Register of Historic Places in 2006. Strathmore homes designed by Ward Wellington Ward which are listed on the National Register of Historic Places are:

- Clark House, 105 Strathmore Drive
- Dunfee House, 206 Summit Avenue
- Fairchild House, 111 Clairmont Ave
- Hunziker House, 265 Robineau Road
- Porter House, 106 Strathmore Drive
- Sanford House, 211 Summit Ave
- Stowell House, 225 Robineau Road
- White House, 176 Robineau Road

Other listings on the National Register of Historic Places are the Huntley Apartments, Onondaga Highlands-Swaneola Heights Historic District, Onondaga Park, and Strathmore "By the Park" Subdivision.
