= Meadowbrook, Syracuse =

Neighborhood in Syracuse, New York

- Neighborhood
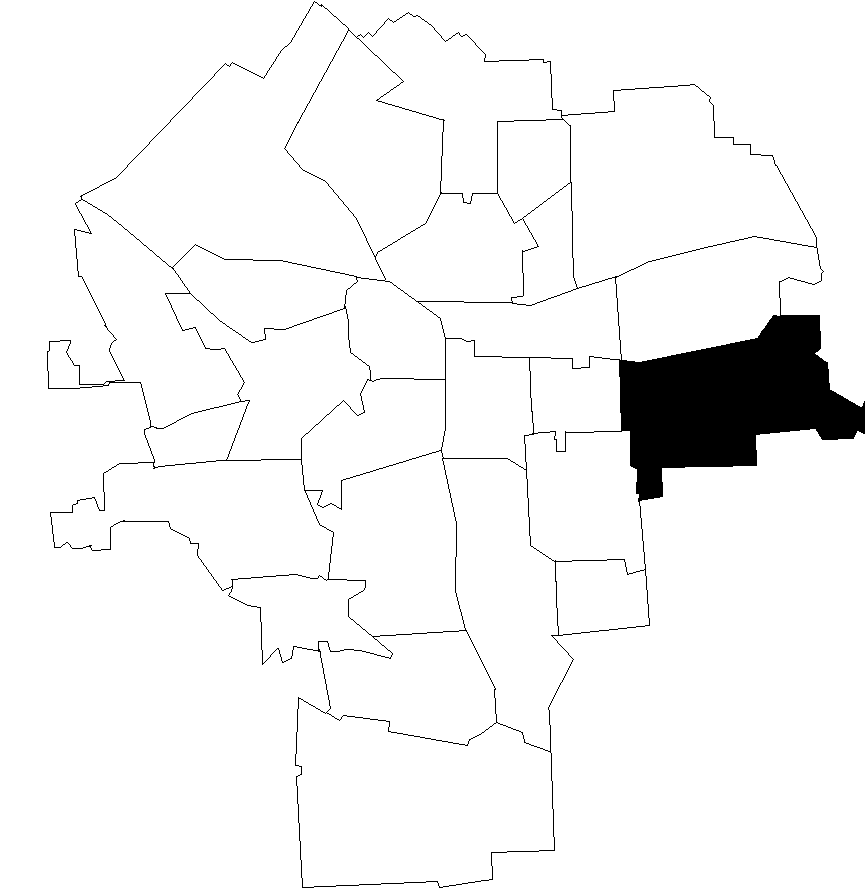
- Location in Syracuse
- Interactive map of Meadowbrook, Syracuse
- Coordinates: 43.046°N 76.095°W
- Country: United States of America
- State: New York
- City: Syracuse

Population (2014)
  - Total: 5,202
- Time zone: EST
- Zip codes: 13210, 13224, 13214

Meadowbrook (also known as Meadow's Brook) is a Syracuse, New York neighborhood, located in the southeastern corner of the city. It corresponds to Onondaga County Census Tract 46. It is named after Meadow Brook, which runs through it and into Butternut Creek.

== Borders ==
Its northern border runs along Salt Springs and Springfield Roads to the north, where it borders the Salt Springs neighborhood. To the west, its borders are Westmoreland Avenue, Cumberland Avenue, and Nottingham Road, where it borders the Westcott and University neighborhoods. To the south and east the neighborhood borders the Town of DeWitt.

== Streets ==
Meadowbrook is bisected by New York State Route 92, East Genesee Street. Other major roads in the neighborhood include Meadowbrook Drive, Euclid Avenue, and Hillsboro Parkway. Most streets do not have sidewalks, although there are plans to install some.

== Education ==
Le Moyne College, Syracuse's second-largest college, is located in Meadowbrook's northeast corner. Nottingham High School is located on East Genesee Street, near the center of the neighborhood. There are two primary schools: H.W. Smith School, and Solace Elementary School. The Manlius Pebble Hill School, an independent pre-K to 12 school is located near the neighborhood, in DeWitt.

== Retail ==
There is not much retail located in Meadowbrook. Nottingham Plaza (with about 10 small stores) and P&C Plaza are in its southwest corner near/on the border with DeWitt.

== Characteristics ==
Meadowbrook is one of the wealthiest neighborhoods in Syracuse, with suburban-style housing, as a result of which it is sometimes referred to as "the suburb in the city." 80.7 percent of housing in the neighborhood is owner-occupied, about twice the citywide average. As of 2010-2014 Census information, 5,202 people lived in Meadowbrook. From that same period, the median household income for the neighborhood was $73,000. Registered voters are 54% Democrat, 19% Republican, 21% non-enrolled, and 5% percent other.

The Ashton House, Harry N. Burhans House, Fuller House, Hoeffer House, Poehlman House, Sanderson House at 112 Scottholm Terrace, Sanderson House at 301 Scottholm Boulevard, Scottholm Tract Historic District, and Louis and Celia Skoler Residence are listed on the National Register of Historic Places.
