= University Neighborhood, Syracuse =

Neighborhood of Syracuse, New York

Coordinates: 43.030°N 76.124°W

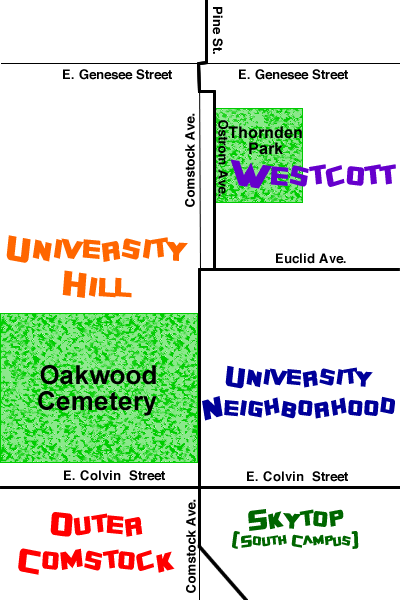
The University Neighborhood in relation to other nearby neighborhoods, with approximate boundaries. (Not to scale)

The University Neighborhood is one of Syracuse, New York's 26 officially recognized neighborhoods. It borders the neighborhoods of Westcott to the north, University Hill to the west, Outer Comstock to the southwest, Skytop (South Campus) to the south, and Meadowbrook to the east.

The University Neighborhood is mostly residential, with only a few convenience stores located throughout. The neighborhood is close to retail and dining, however, with Westcott Street being lined with small shops and restaurants immediately to the north, and the Nottingham Plaza across East Colvin Street at its southeastern corner. This plaza has a grocery store, Eckerd drug store, liquor store, barber shop, as well as a UPS Store behind it. Additionally, Marshall Street, the main retail area of adjacent University Hill is within a short walk of the northwestern corner of the neighborhood. The neighborhood is also home to the city's only cooperative grocery store, the Syracuse Real Food Co-op.

== History ==
Like its surrounding neighborhoods, the University Neighborhood grew as a result of the growth of Syracuse University, which was founded in 1870. Electric streetcars ran along Euclid Avenue, its northern border. As the university continued to grow, particularly after World War II, students moved into many of the houses along Euclid Avenue and its side streets. When the university went through a short period of enrollment decline in the early 1990s, it enacted a sophomore residency requirement, which required second-year students to live in university housing. Previously only freshmen were required to do so. As a result, some University Neighborhood buildings were acquired by non-students. It also includes the Berkeley Park Historic District.

The Berkeley Park Subdivision Historic District, Spencer House, Ward House, and Welsh House are listed on the National Register of Historic Places.

== Conflicts ==
Today the neighborhood consists of a mixture of families and students. This unusual combination results in vibrant diversity, however the students of Syracuse University command the nightlife presence. Though conflict is usually limited to noise complaints from these late-night student parties, an extreme example occurred on May 1, 1999, when students hosted a block party on Livingston Avenue, causing the event to be colloquially called the "Livingstock Riots". Over 1,000 people attended, which created a mob-like mentality among the intoxicated students. Violence broke out when police arrived to end the party at 10 P.M. Syracuse Police used riot gear for the first time in over a decade to break up the riot, which had spun out of control after furniture and debris were set on fire in the streets. The aftermath of this event lead to 39 arrests being made, 15 of them from the university itself. Subsequent block parties (resuming in 2007) have not featured violence.
