= Onondaga Highlands–Swaneola Heights Historic District =

Historic district in New York, United States

- U.S. National Register of Historic Places
- U.S. Historic district
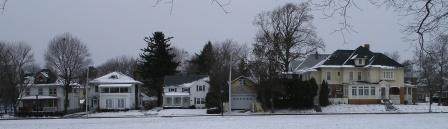

- Location within New York
- Location: Syracuse, New York
- Coordinates: 43°1′49″N 76°10′1″W
- NRHP reference No.: 10000590
- Added to NRHP: August 30, 2010

The Onondaga Highlands–Swaneola Heights Historic District is a historic district in the Strathmore neighborhood of Syracuse, New York. The historic district was nominated to be listed on the National Register of Historic Places (NRHP) in 2009. The New York State's Board of Historic Preservation described the district as "'a turn-of-the-20th-century subdivision where the rolling topography, uniform building setback and popular residential styles form a cohesive neighborhood that retains its architectural integrity.'"

It includes at least three previously NRHP-listed houses designed by Ward Wellington Ward:

- Dunfee House (Syracuse, New York) at 206 Summit
- Fairchild House (Syracuse, New York) at 111 Claremont Ave.
- Sanford House at 211 Summit
