= Sedgwick, Syracuse =

Coordinates: 43.0667°N 76.1309°W

Sedgwick is one of the 26 officially recognized neighborhoods of Syracuse, New York, United States. It borders four other Syracuse neighborhoods, with Northside to the north and west, Near Northeast to the southwest, Lincoln Park to the south, and Eastwood to the east.

Sedgwick, and more specifically Sedgwick Farms, are an established, historic, affluent, and architecturally significant district in near northeast Syracuse which features the most elaborate, extensive, and eclectic collection of early-20th century residences in the city. The stately homes found in this neighborhood represent some of the finest works of Syracuse architects, landscape architects, interior designers, and builders, including Ward Wellington Ward, Dwight James Baum, Paul Hueber, Bonta and Taylor, Archimedes Russell, and Harry King. The John G. Ayling House was listed on the National Register of Historic Places in 2011.

Sedgwick and Sedgwick Farms are well regarded for their architectural and landscape diversity. Winding boulevards and tree-lined streets feature noteworthy historical revival examples of the Italianate, Georgian Colonial, Dutch Colonial, Federal, Norman French, Spanish, and English Tudor pre-war residential architecture. The neighborhood is characterized by its Garden City town planning principles, bucolic tree-lined streets, and manicured landscaping. In 1977, the Sedgwick-James-Highland Preservation district was first established as the largest preservation district in Syracuse.

The Sedgwick-James-Highland Preservation District contains approximately 285 residences, one church, Lincoln Junior High School, and a number of business establishments, several of which are residential conversions. The district divides itself into three distinct but contiguous sections: Upper James Street, the original Sedgwick Farms Land Tract, and a contiguous length of Highland Avenue with side streets Oak and DeWitt. These three areas are unified by the continuity of their architectural styles, urban form, and neighborhood character. The residences in these areas are among the finest in the city and approximately 95% of them were built in the first three decades of the twentieth century.

Highland and James streets, laid out in the nineteenth century, run parallel and form a southwest-northeast axis for the district. Extending north from the center section of this axis is the Sedgwick Farms Tract. Sedgwick Drive is the main landscaped boulevard at the heart of Sedgwick Farms.

== Sources ==
- City of Syracuse (official nite) Neighborhoods
- Description of the neighborhood at syracusethenandnow.org
- http://www.sedgwickfarm.org/history.html
