= Estabrook House (Syracuse, New York) =

Historic house in New York, United States

- U.S. National Register of Historic Places
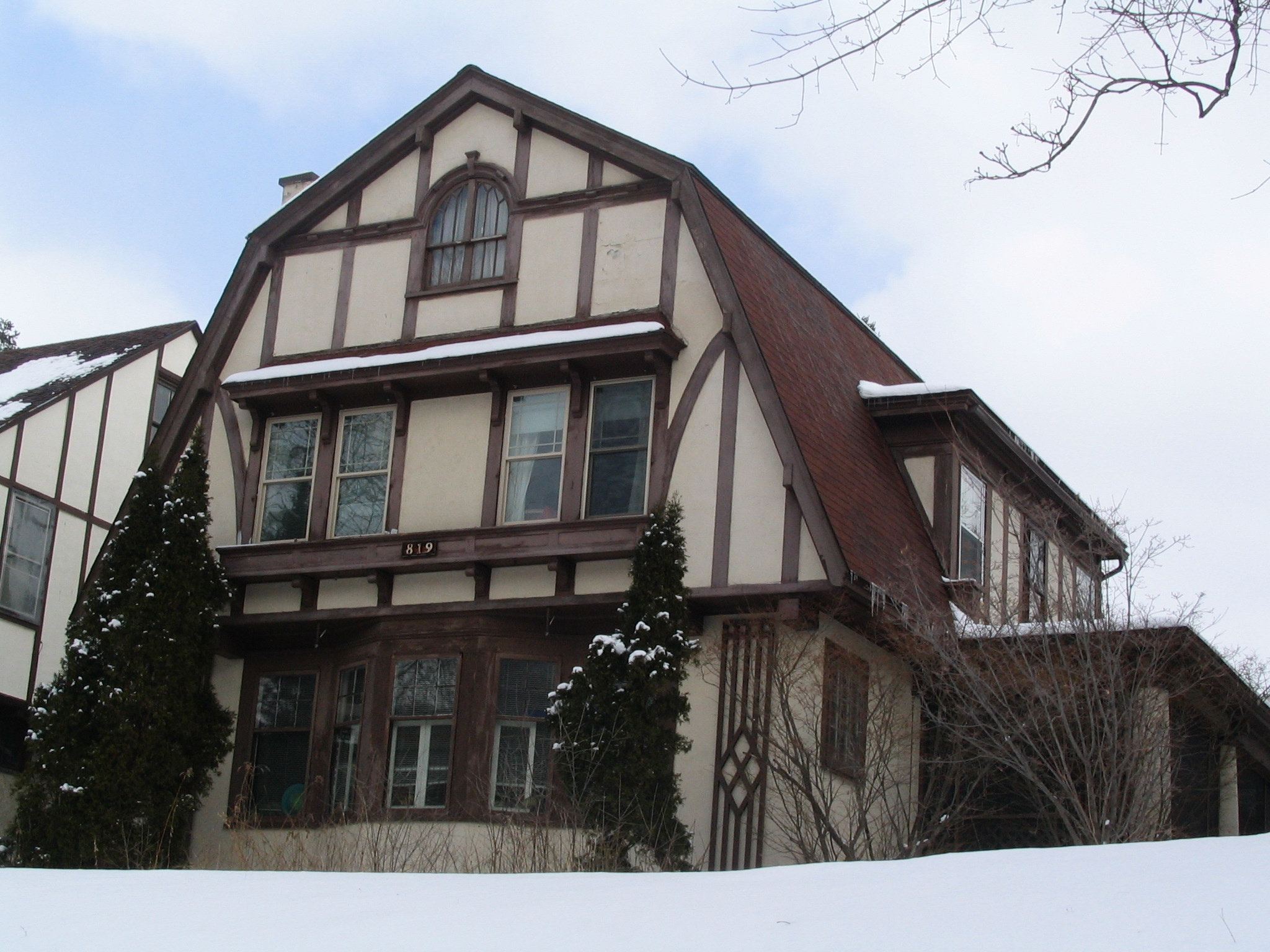

- Location within New York Location within the United States
- Location: 819 Comstock Ave., Syracuse, New York
- Coordinates: 43°2′4.51″N 76°7′47.3″W
- Built: 1909
- Architect: Ward Wellington Ward
- Architectural style: Bungalow/craftsman
- MPS: Architecture of Ward Wellington Ward in Syracuse MPS
- NRHP reference No.: 97000071
- Added to NRHP: February 14, 1997

Estabrook House in Syracuse, New York was built in 1909. Along with other Ward Wellington Ward-designed homes in Syracuse, it was listed on the National Register of Historic Places in 1997. The home's design includes a gambrel roof and a jettied second story. It is currently a private residence.

The Charles Estabrook Mansion is another Ward home, in Fayetteville outside Syracuse.

== See also ==
- List of Registered Historic Places in Onondaga County, New York
