= John G. Ayling House =

Historic house in New York, United States

- U.S. National Register of Historic Places
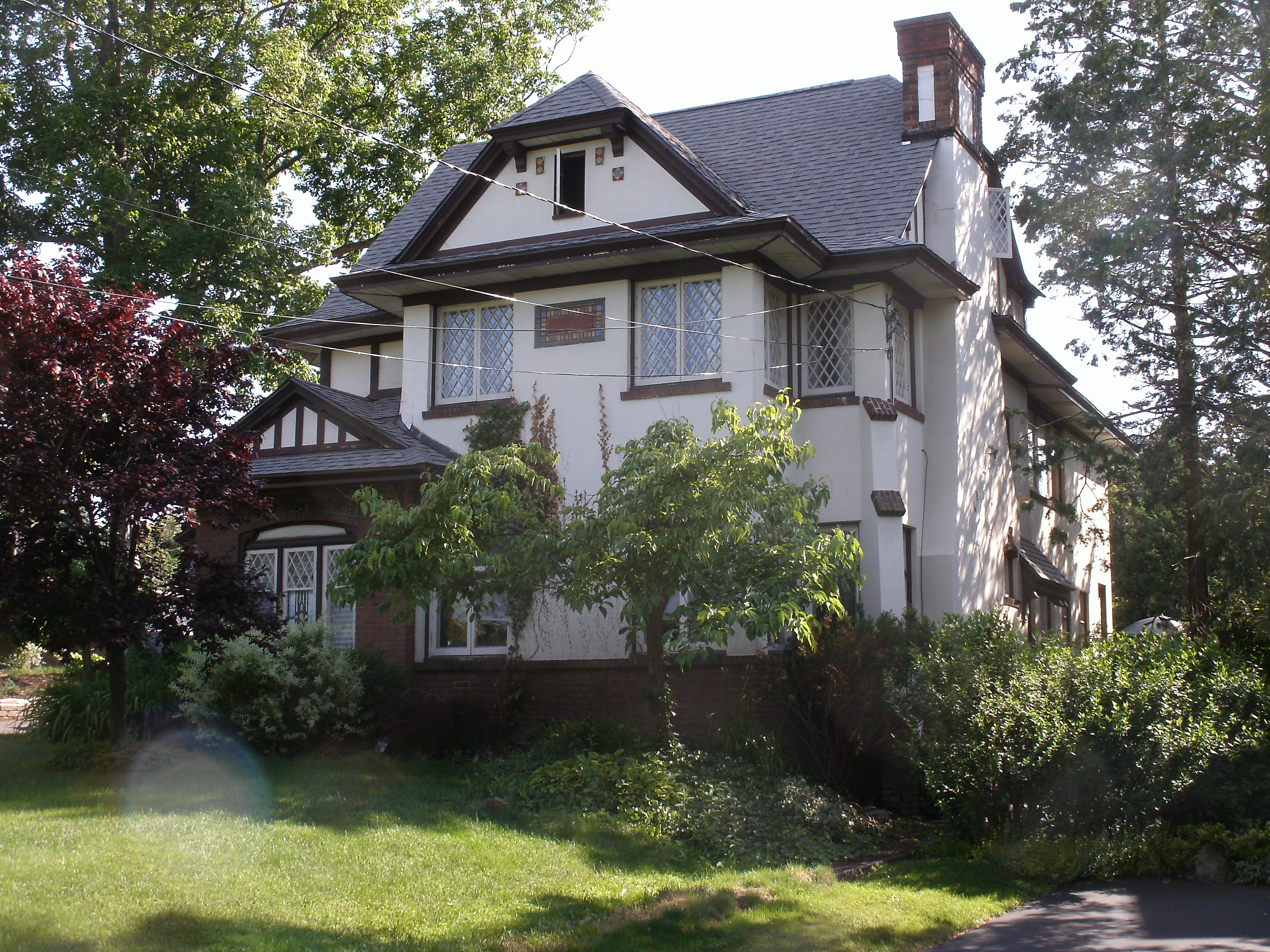
- John G. Ayling House, June 2011

- Location within New York Location within the United States
- Interactive map showing the location of John G. Ayling House
- Location: 223 DeWitt St., Syracuse, New York
- Coordinates: 43°03′47″N 76°08′02″W
- Area: less than one acre
- Built: 1915
- Architect: Ward Wellington Ward
- Architectural style: Tudor Revival, American Craftsman
- MPS: Architecture of Ward Wellington Ward in Syracuse MPS
- NRHP reference No.: 11000277
- Added to NRHP: May 6, 2011

The John G. Ayling House is a historic house located at 223 DeWitt Street in the Sedgwick neighborhood of Syracuse, Onondaga County, New York.

== Description and history ==
It was designed by architect Ward Wellington Ward (1875–1932) and built in 1915. It is a two-story, Tudor Revival style asymmetrical dwelling. It is sheathed in stucco and half-timbering and has a steep cross-gabled roof. The house features diamond paned and leaded glass windows and American Craftsman inspired Moravian tiles.

It was listed on the National Register of Historic Places on May 6, 2011.

In 2015, the house was bought by writers Jonathan Dee and Dana Spiotta, who began residing there.
