= Skytop, Syracuse =

Coordinates: 43.0218°N 76.1236°W

Skytop is one of the 26 officially recognized neighborhoods of Syracuse, New York. It includes Syracuse University's South Campus.

== Geography ==
It borders two other Syracuse neighborhoods: University Neighborhood to the north, and Outer Comstock to the west. It holds Syracuse University's South Campus Housing.
