= Outer Comstock, Syracuse =

Coordinates: 43°1′9″N 76°7′52″W

Outer Comstock is one of the 26 officially recognized neighborhoods of Syracuse, New York.

== Geography ==
It borders six other Syracuse neighborhoods, with University Hill to the north, Brighton and North Valley to the west, the University Neighborhood and Skytop (Syracuse University's South Campus) to the east, and South Valley to the south.

Route 81 forms the neighborhood's boundary to the west. In the south it is roughly marked by Seneca Turnpike as it ascends from The Valley, in the east by (from north to south) Comstock Ave., East Colvin St., the hill crest between Roe Ave. and the Skytop neighborhood, and the southeastern city limits, and in the north by the boundary between Oakwood Cemetery and the SU campus.

There are four signs, painted dark green with gold lettering, erected c. 2003, marking the Outer Comstock bounds; these are located at the corner of East Colvin and Benedict Ave. in the northwest, the corner of East Colvin and Comstock at Comfort Tyler Park (informally known as Comstock Park) in the northeast, the corner of East Brighton Ave. and Thurber St. on the west, and the corner of Jamesville Ave. and Ainsley Dr. in the southeast.

== Residential ==
The Outer Comstock neighborhood contains mostly modest ranches, split-levels and bungalow style homes, as well as a few apartment complexes.

== Commercial ==
At the top of the southern hill past the onramp to Interstate 481 is a concentrated commercial park with medical and financial offices, two gas stations and some restaurants.

Between Thurber and 481 on Brighton Ave. are a vintage used-car dealer, an auto-repair shop, an old newspaper press, a distribution warehouse, as well as the main offices for the local apartment complexes.

== Industrial ==
Along Ainsley Drive lies a dealer for Caterpillar Inc., as well as a number of buildings owned by Syracuse University and a few other warehouse type buildings.

Outer Comstock, as well as other neighborhoods including Brighton and Washington Square were found to have higher levels of iron and manganese, likely as a result of past industrial land use.

== Miscellaneous ==
Percy Hughes Magnet School, a Syracuse City school serving children in grades K-6, is the only school in the neighborhood, at 345 Jamesville Ave.

There are three cemeteries in the area; Oakwood Cemetery, Temple Beth El Poiley Czedeck Cemetery, which lies between Hughes school, Jamesville Ave., East Colvin and the backyards of the residents of the west side of Hughes Place, and Frumah Packard Cemetery, bounded by Thurber St., Jamesville Ave., and the apartment complexes of Remington Gardens and Hidden Valley Apartments.

There are two local churches; The Church of Jesus Christ of Latter-day Saints on East Colvin across from the Temple Beth El (Syracuse) cemetery, and St. Andrew's Catholic Church on Alden St. Notably, though technically it is not in the Outer Comstock neighborhood, the Masjid Islamic Society of Central New York Mosque is across the street from Oakwood Cemetery, where there are a small number of Muslim graves.

Comfort Tyler Park, in the northeastern part of the neighborhood, has two basketball hoops with enough pavement for half-court games, three tennis courts in borderline yet playable condition, playgrounds, a large field where various athletic teams from the Hughes school play their games, and a formerly wooded area, which was devastated by the 1998 [Labor Day Storm New York State Labor Day Derechos; trees have been replanted in similar locations, but it will likely take 50–75 years before the park regains the forest ambiance of ten years ago.

Nevertheless, in the summer a great number of locals can be seen competing in basketball and soccer and commiserating amongst themselves, whilst children play on the jungle gym and swings, and in the water sprayed by a stone seal over an asphalt ridge.
