= Scottholm, Syracuse =

- Scottholm Tract Historic District
- U.S. National Register of Historic Places
- U.S. Historic district
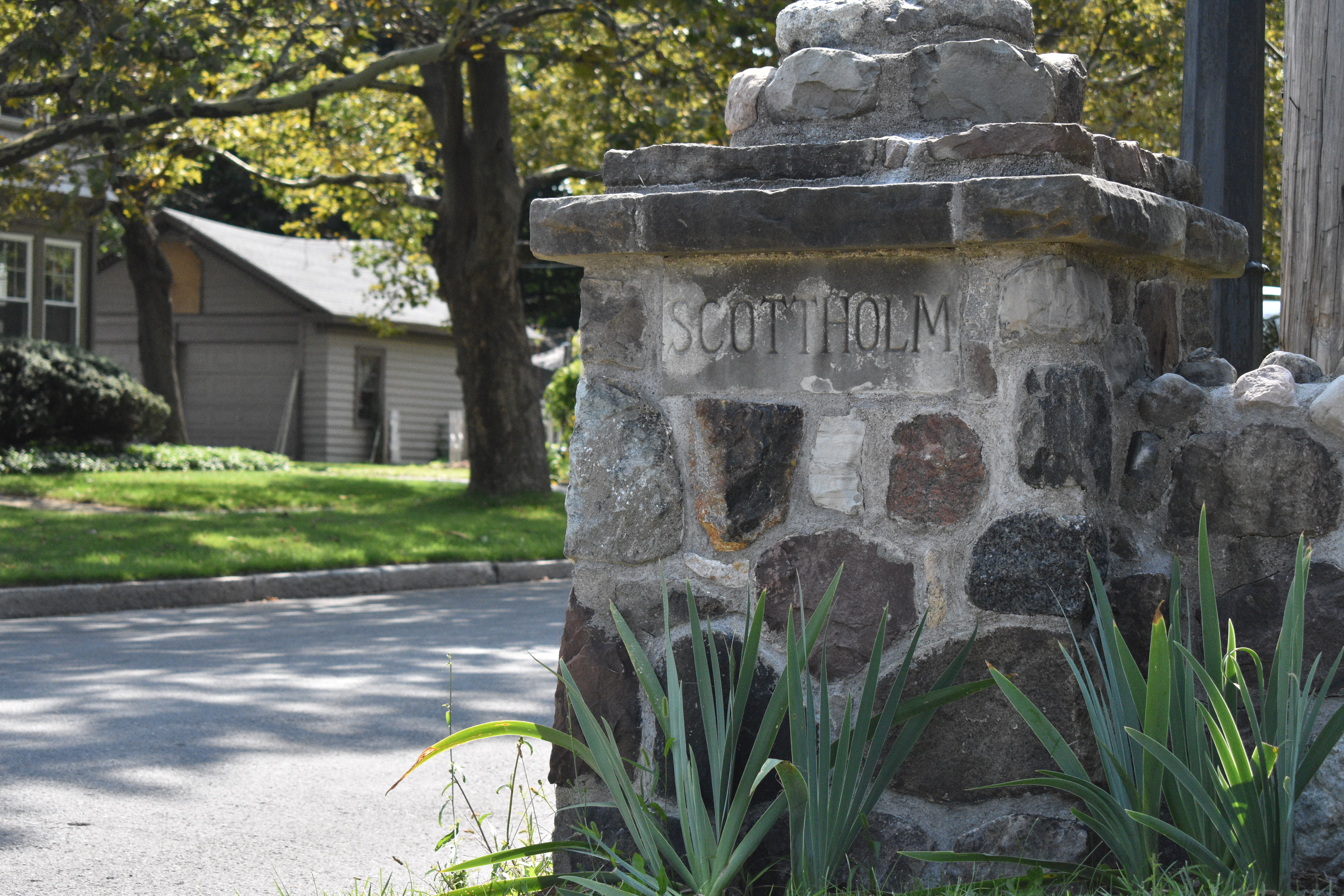

- Location within New York Location within the United States
- Location: bounded by Salt Springs Road on the north; Brookford Road and East Avenue on the east; Meadowbrook Drive on the south; and Scottholm Terrace on the west., Syracuse, New York
- Coordinates: 43°02′29″N 76°06′33″W
- Area: 49.42 acres (20.00 ha)
- Built: 1850, 1915, 1940
- Architect: Corney, Arthur; Sanderson, Amon; Ward, Ward Wellington
- Architectural style: Colonial Revival, Tudor Revival, Mission Revival, Bungalow / Craftsman
- NRHP reference No.: 12000407
- Added to NRHP: July 11, 2012

Scottholm is an historic housing development in the Meadowbrook neighborhood of Syracuse, Onondaga County, New York. It has been registered as a National Historic District. It is bounded by Salt Springs Road on the north; Brookford Road and East Avenue on the east; Meadowbrook Drive on the south; and Scottholm Terrace on the west. Scottholm consists of single‐family homes of varying styles built in the early 20th century. When it was built, Scottholm was marketed to upper middle class and upper class residents. Today, the area attracts a diverse population of white collar, academic, and creative class professionals. Nottingham High School, in the Syracuse City School District, is nearby.

== Scottholm Tract Historic District ==
The Scottholm Tract Historic District is a national historic district encompassing 266 contributing buildings, 1 contributing structure, and 1 contributing site in an exclusively residential section of Syracuse. The neighborhood is well regarded for its architectural and landscape diversity. Winding boulevards and tree-lined streets feature noteworthy examples of Colonial Revival, Tudor Revival, Mission Revival, and Bungalow / American Craftsman style residential architecture. Scottholm is characterized by its Garden City town planning principles and manicured landscaping.

Development of the area began with creation of Genesee Turnpike, now Genesee Street in the 1830s, but what would become “Scottholm Estates” was sketched out in 1914 and lots were sold beginning in 1915. The survey identifies about 30 houses as dating from 1915–1925. Most date from the late 1920s and early 1930s, suggesting the effects of the Depression took a while to be fully felt by Syracuse's white collar professionals who made up a substantial portion of the neighborhood residents. Some of the houses were designed by local architect Ward Wellington Ward.

Scottholm was designed by a landscape architect and planner Arthur C. Comey following the popular ideals for new garden suburbs easily reached by streetcar from urban commercial centers. These new developments, of which Syracuse has several notable examples, are typified by winding streets, mandated setbacks and front yards, organized tree-planting alongside sidewalks, and various protective covenants regarding ownership qualifications. The historic stone gates at the entrances to the Scottholm neighborhood on East Genesee Street remain in place.

Located in the district are the separately listed Poehlman House, Sanderson House at 112 Scottholm Terrace, and Sanderson House at 301 Scottholm Boulevard. Other notable buildings include the Scott Family Farmhouse.

It was listed on the National Register of Historic Places in 2012.
