= Ziegler House (Syracuse, New York) =

Historic house in New York, United States

- U.S. National Register of Historic Places
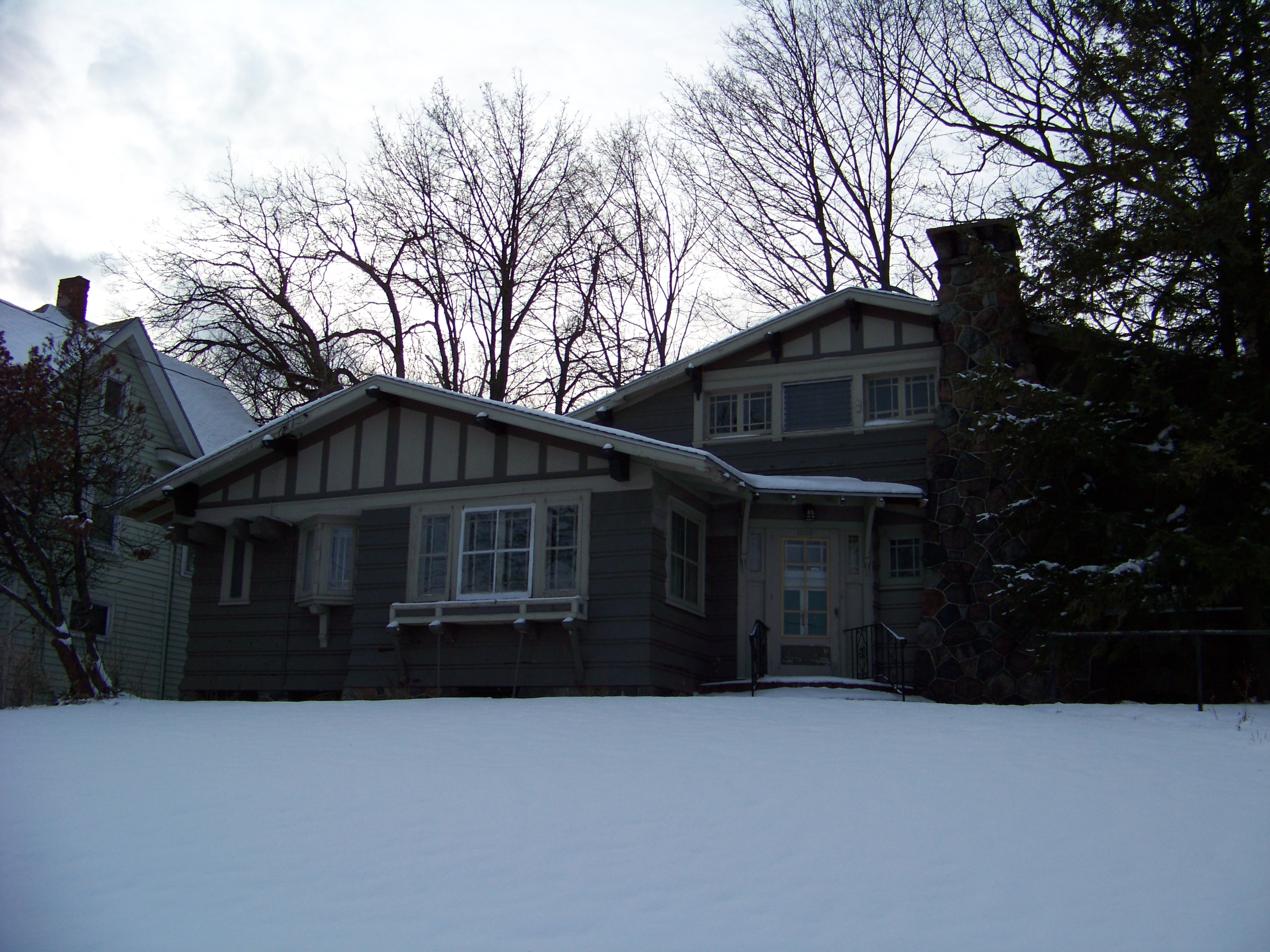

- Location within New York Location within the United States
- Interactive map showing the location of Ziegler House
- Location: 1035 Oak St., Syracuse, New York
- Coordinates: 43°3′59.47″N 76°8′13.2″W
- Built: 1915
- Architect: Ward Wellington Ward
- Architectural style: Bungalow/craftsman
- MPS: Architecture of Ward Wellington Ward in Syracuse MPS
- NRHP reference No.: 97000082
- Added to NRHP: February 14, 1997

The Ziegler House, also known as Ziegler Residence, is a 1 1/2-story house located in Syracuse, New York. Designed by architect Ward Wellington Ward, it was built in 1915 and was listed on the National Register of Historic Places in 1997, along with other Ward Wellington Ward-designed homes. The property includes a garage, also designed by Ward, which included a turntable (that no longer functions) in which vehicles would not need to be backed out of the driveway.

The property was listed for its architecture. The living room includes a Mercer tile fireplace.

As of the 1997 listing, the kitchen was one of very few original kitchens in a Ward-designed home.
