= Fuller House (Syracuse, New York) =

Historic house in New York, United States

- U.S. National Register of Historic Places
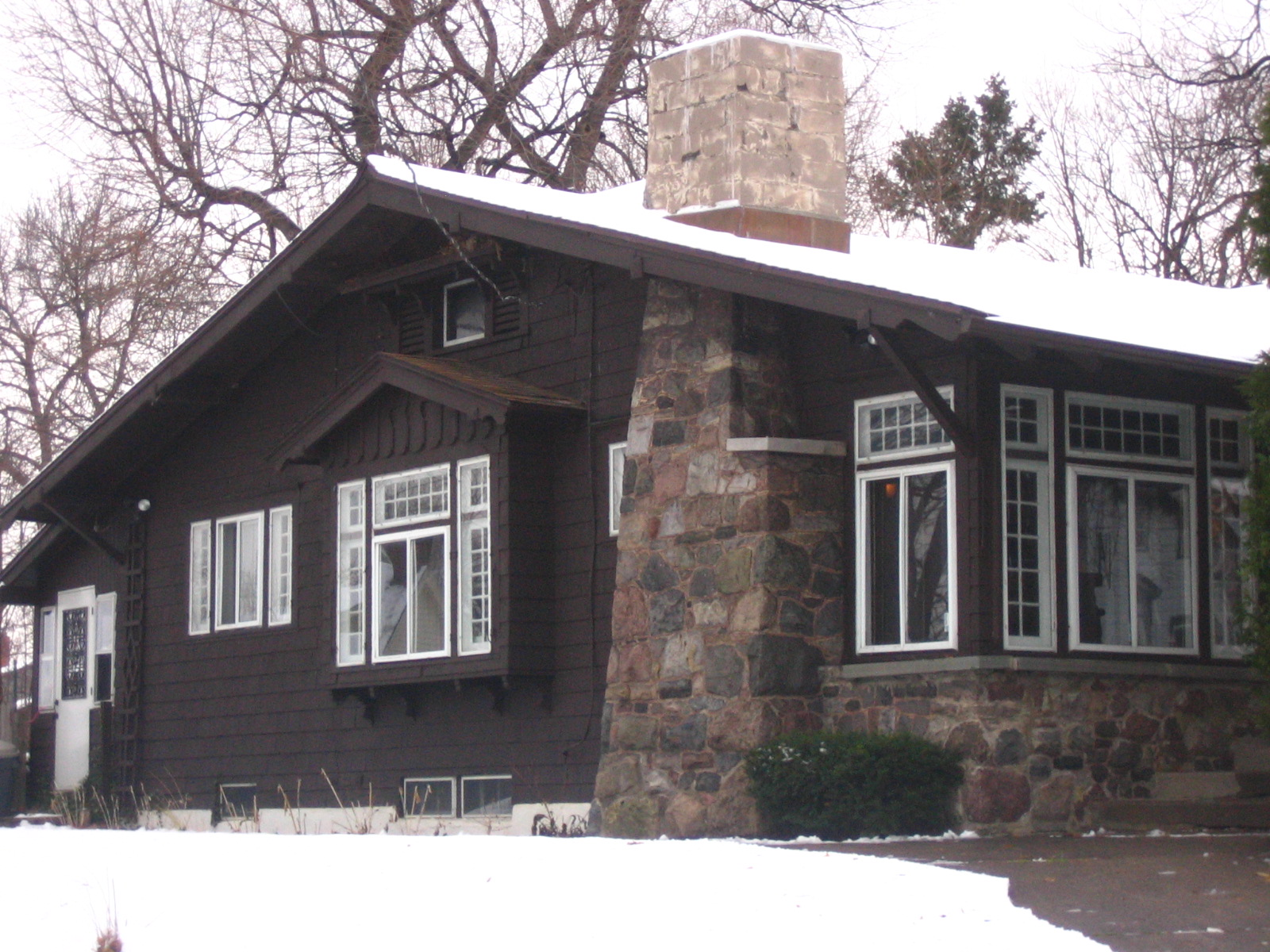
- Detail

- Location within New York Location within the United States
- Location: 215 Salt Springs Rd., Syracuse, New York
- Coordinates: 43°2′42.78″N 76°6′39.81″W
- Built: 1911
- Architect: Ward Wellington Ward
- Architectural style: Bungalow/craftsman
- MPS: Architecture of Ward Wellington Ward in Syracuse MPS
- NRHP reference No.: 97000088
- Added to NRHP: February 14, 1997

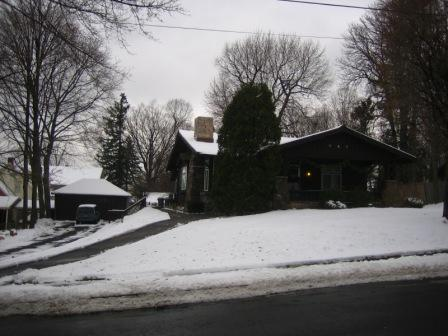
Full view including matching garage

The Fuller House, also known as the Fuller Residence, in Syracuse, New York was designed by Ward Wellington Ward. Along with other homes he designed, it was listed on the National Register of Historic Places in 1997.

The house includes Craftsman architectural style elements.

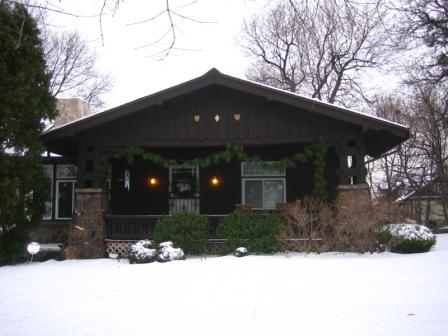
Front detail

It is located directly across Salt Springs Road from the Harry N. Burhans House, a house that was substantially revised by Ward.
