= Garrett House (Syracuse, New York) =

Historic house in New York, United States

- U.S. National Register of Historic Places
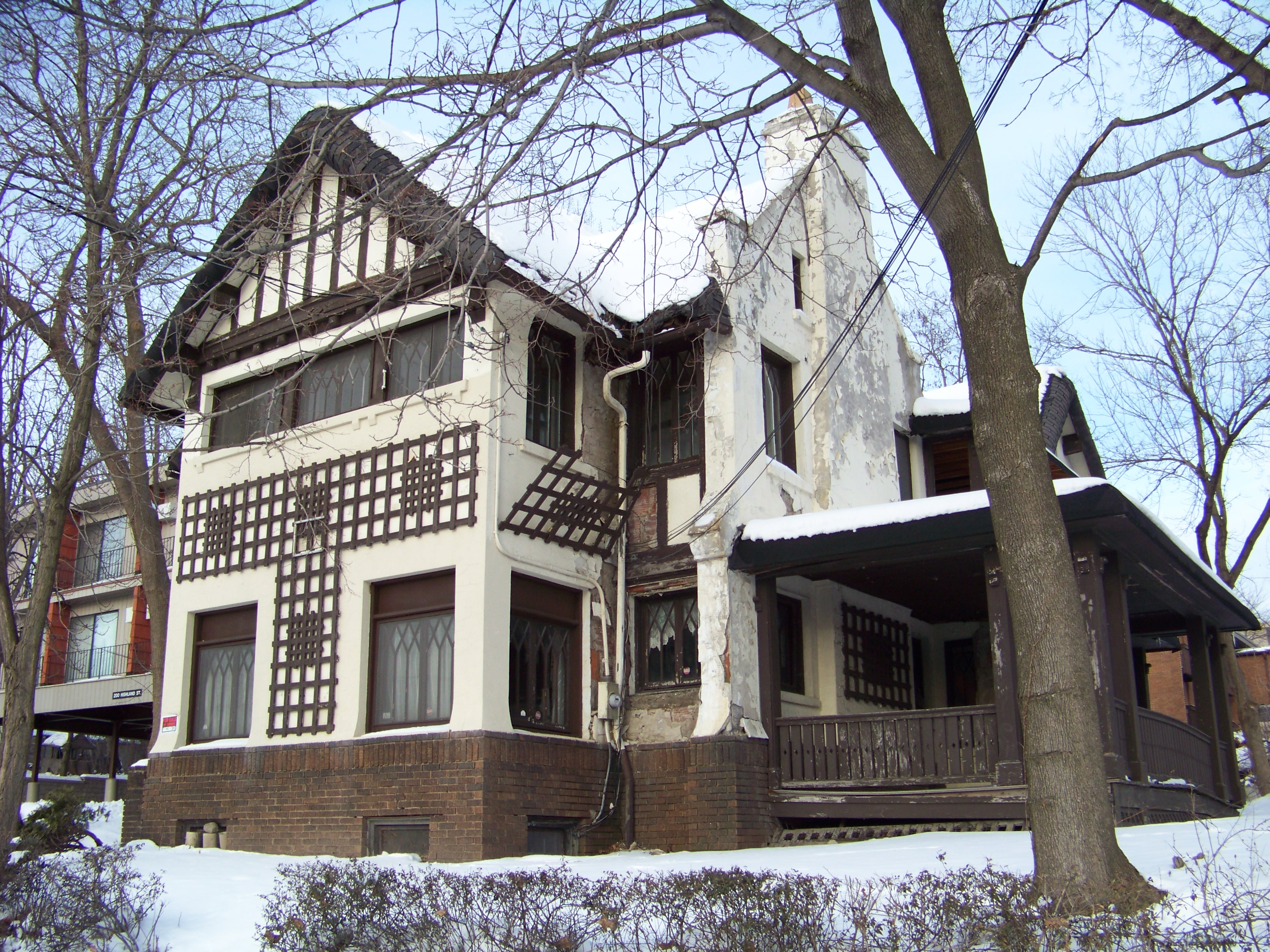

- Location within New York Location within the United States
- Interactive map showing the location of Garrett House
- Location: 110 Highland St., Syracuse, New York
- Coordinates: 43°3′28.78″N 76°8′22″W
- Built: 1913
- Architect: Ward Wellington Ward
- Architectural style: Tudor Revival
- MPS: Architecture of Ward Wellington Ward in Syracuse MPS
- NRHP reference No.: 97000080
- Added to NRHP: February 14, 1997

Frank Garrett House, also known as the Garrett Residence, in Syracuse, New York, was built in 1913. Along with other Ward Wellington Ward-designed homes, it was listed on the National Register of Historic Places in 1997.

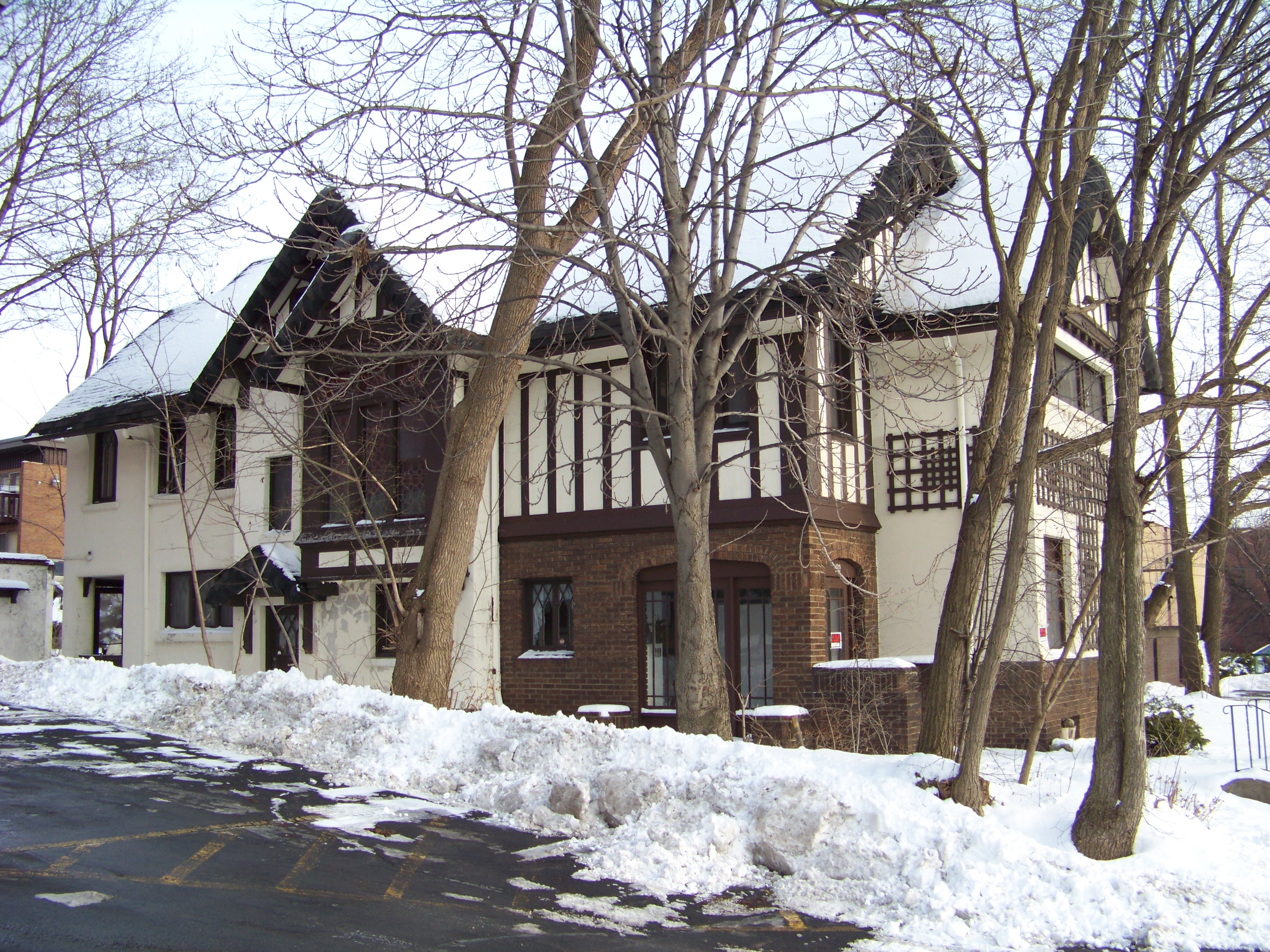
Northern elevation

It is listed for its architecture. The most distinctive feature on the outside of the house was that its roof was made to look like an English Cottage thatched roof. As can be seen in the photos taken in January, 2009, the roof has been covered with modern asphalt shingles and the house sported a "For Sale by Owner" sign. The Mercer fireplace in the first floor living room, customary in Ward Wellington Ward houses, is an exceptionally impressive one depicting St. George and the Dragon.

In January 2011, the Garrett House was purchased by a private buyer and was in the process of being restored. As of October 2025, it appears to be abandoned.

The 2021 book Wayward by author Dana Spiotta features the house prominently in the story. The house has sat vacant.
