= Onondaga Park =

Historic park in Syracuse, New York

- U.S. National Register of Historic Places
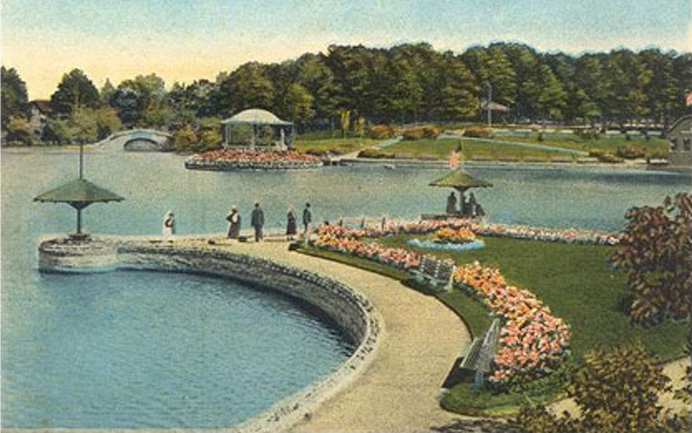
- Postcard from 1910 showing Hiawatha Lake in Upper Onondaga Park

- Location within New York Location within the United States
- Location: Syracuse, New York
- Coordinates: 43°01′38″N 76°09′47″W
- Built: 1898
- Architect: George Kessler, Thurber J. Gillette
- Architectural style: Colonial Revival
- MPS: Historic Designed Landscapes of Syracuse MPS
- NRHP reference No.: 02001657
- Added to NRHP: 2002-12-31

Onondaga Park is an 82.6-acre (33.4 ha) park in the city of Syracuse, New York. Man-made Hiawatha Lake is located within the park, which is situated in Syracuse's Strathmore neighborhood on the city's south side.

Portions of the park were designed by famed urban planner George Kessler in the early 20th century. The park was placed on the National Register of Historic Places in 2002.

== Park description ==
Onondaga Park consists of two neighboring sections, Lower Onondaga Park and Upper Onondaga Park. Upper and Lower Onondaga parks are linked with nearby Kirk Park via Onondaga Creek Boulevard, a parkway completed in 1930. The three parks, together with the parkway, form the only interconnected park system in Syracuse.

=== Lower Onondaga Park ===
Lower Onondaga Park is 15.6 acres (6.3 ha) in size, and contains a baseball diamond and a greenhouse which supplies plants used by many of Syracuse's parks.

This portion of the park was originally landscaped according to designs by urban planner George Kessler, who was hired to design the park in 1907. The park was completed according to Kessler's designs in 1915, featuring extensive stonework and several ponds, including Star Lake, which contained five fountain jets. A large neoclassical greenhouse, designed by a local architect, was added in 1917. Although some remnants of Kessler's original landscaping remain, several changes in the years that followed have obscured the original design, including the channelization of Onondaga Creek in 1927, and the city's decision to fill in Star Lake in the 1970s.

=== Upper Onondaga Park ===
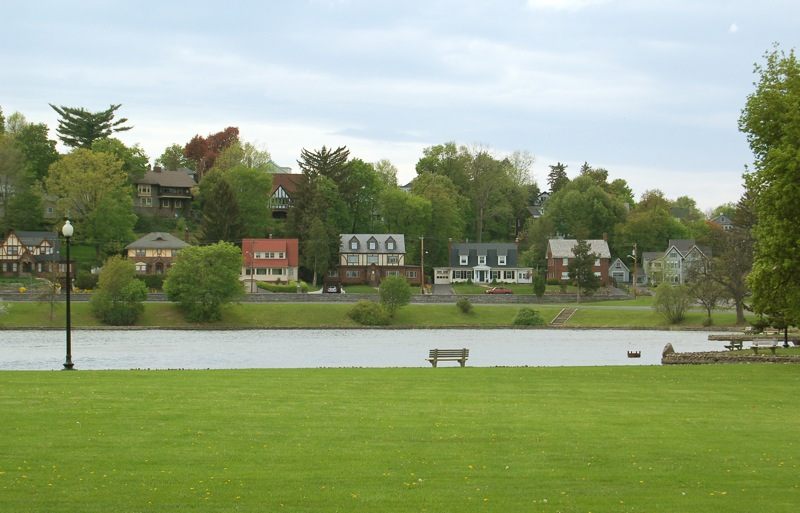
Upper Onondaga Park, overlooking Hiawatha Lake, in May 2006.

The 67-acre (27 ha) Upper Onondaga Park is built around Hiawatha Lake. This portion of the park also includes eight tennis courts, three basketball courts, a playground, and a 50-metre (160 ft) swimming pool with the capacity to hold 352 bathers.

Upper Onondaga Park occupies the site of the former Wilkinson Reservoir, which was built to supply Syracuse with water in the 1870s. The city acquired the reservoir and surrounding land in 1892 and opened the area as a park in 1898.

==== Hiawatha Lake ====
In 1911, Wilkinson Reservoir was re-contoured as a 17-acre (6.9 ha) man-made lake, and has since been known as Hiawatha Lake.

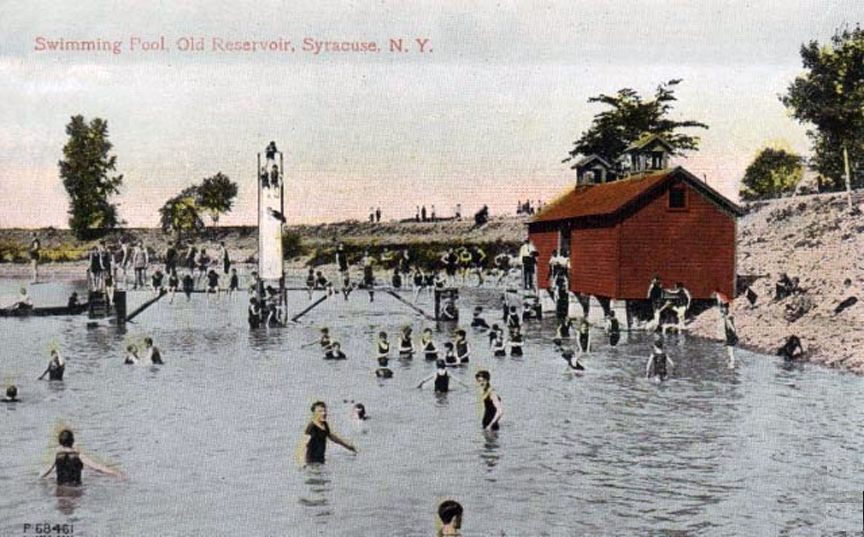
Hiawatha Lake in its early days as a community swimming pool in 1915.

One side of Hiawatha Lake was filled back in and a modern swimming pool was built. In the winter, the lake freezes and local residents use it for pond hockey.

The lake is used for its picturesque quality and large gazebo and often serves as a backdrop for prom and wedding photos.
