= Mohegan Manor =

- Location within New York
- 43°9′33.75″N 76°19′57.37″W
- Location: 58 Oswego Street, Baldwinsville, New York

Site notes
- Architect: Ward Wellington Ward
- Governing body: Private

The Mohegan Manor in Baldwinsville, New York is a building designed and built in 1910 for Odd Fellows use by architect Ward Wellington Ward (1875–1932). It was renovated in the 1990s for use as a restaurant.

Ward was an American architect who worked mostly in Syracuse, New York. He designed more than 250 buildings, of which more than 120 were built and survive.

The Mohegan Manor was originally built for the Independent Order of Odd Fellows and, in 2010, was in use as a restaurant.

The Mohegan Manor is the site of a historic association fundraiser in November 2010.
