= Jonathan Dee =

American novelist and non-fiction writer

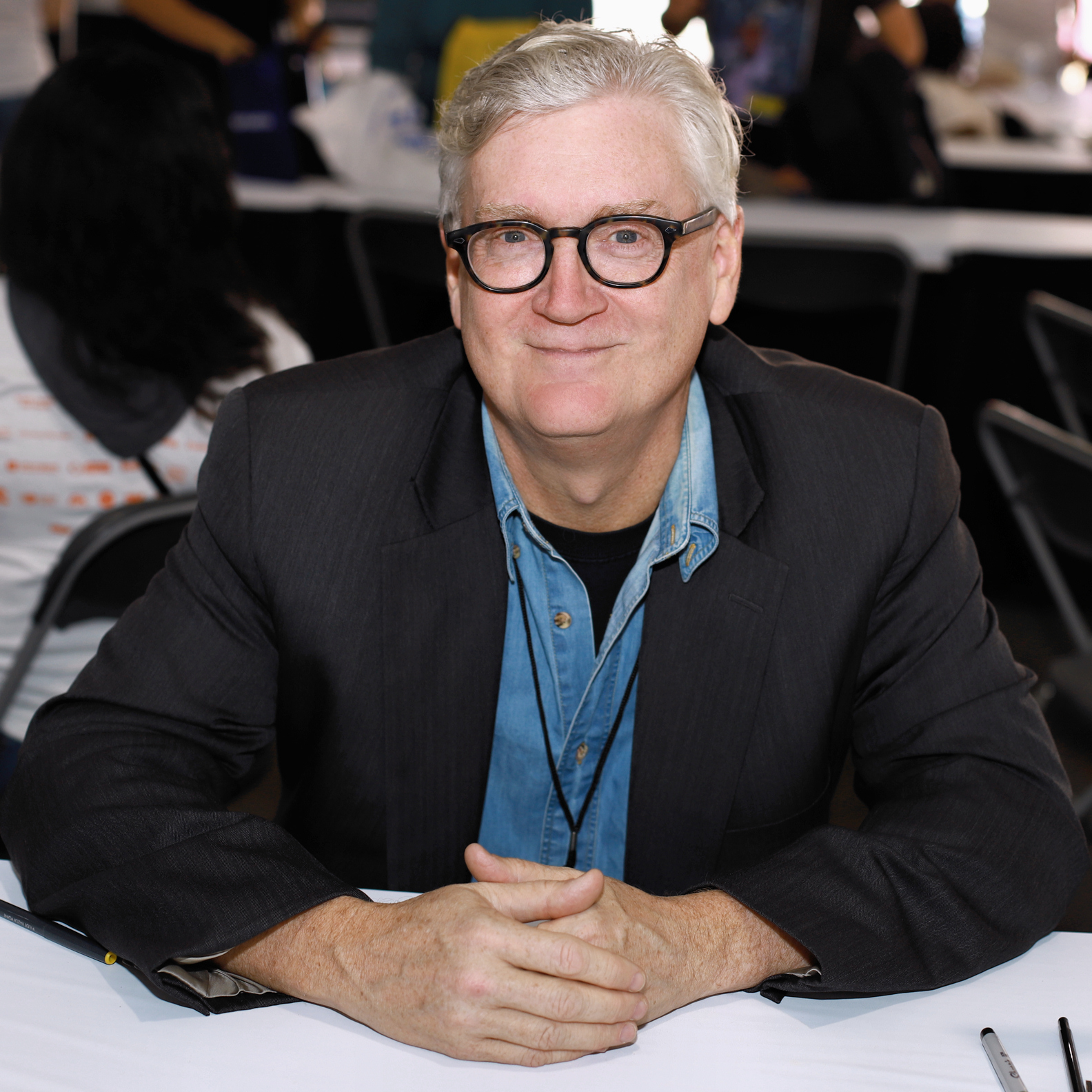
- Dee at the 2022 Texas Book Festival.
- Born: May 19, 1962 (age 64); New York City, U.S.
- Education: Yale University (BA)
- Occupation: Writer
- Writing career
- Notable awards: Prix Fitzgerald for The Privileges (2011)

Jonathan Dee (born May 19, 1962) is an American novelist and non-fiction writer. His fifth novel, The Privileges, was a finalist for the 2011 Pulitzer Prize for Fiction.

== Early life ==
Dee was born in New York City. He graduated from Yale University, where he studied fiction writing with John Hersey.

== Career ==
Dee's first job out of college was at The Paris Review, as an Associate Editor and personal assistant to George Plimpton. Early in his tenure with Plimpton, Dee helped pull off the popular April Fool's joke about Sidd Finch, a fictitious baseball pitcher Plimpton wrote about for Sports Illustrated.

Dee has published eight novels, including The Lover of History, The Liberty Campaign, St. Famous, Palladio, The Privileges, A Thousand Pardons, The Locals, and Sugar Street. He is a staff writer for The New York Times Magazine, and contributor to Harper's. He taught in the graduate writing programs at Columbia University and The New School, and is currently a professor in the graduate writing program at Syracuse University.

Dee collaborated on the oral biography of Plimpton, "George, Being George", published by Random House in 2008. He interviewed Hersey and co-interviewed Grace Paley for The Paris Review's The Art of Fiction series.

== Awards and fellowships ==
Dee was nominated for a National Magazine Award in 2010 for criticism in Harper's. He has received fellowships from The National Endowment for the Arts and the Guggenheim Foundation. His 2010 novel, The Privileges, won the 2011 Fitzgerald prize and was a finalist for the 2011 Pulitzer Prize for Fiction. He was the second winner of the St. Francis College Literary Prize.

== Personal life ==
Dee lives in the historic John G. Ayling House in Syracuse, New York, with his wife, the writer Dana Spiotta.

== Bibliography ==
=== Novels ===
- The Lover of History (1990) (Houghton Mifflin)
- The Liberty Campaign (1993) (Pocket Books)
- St. Famous (1996) (Doubleday)
- Palladio (2002) (Doubleday)
- The Privileges (2010) (Random House)
- A Thousand Pardons (2013) (Random House)
- The Locals (2017) (Random House)
- Sugar Street (2022) (Grove Press)

=== Book reviews ===
Year	Review article	Work(s) reviewed
2021	Dee, Jonathan (March 1, 2021). "Call it like it is : in Viet Than Nguyen's 'The Committed,' fiction is criticism". The Critics. Books. The New Yorker. 97 (2): 62–65. (Note: Online version is titled "How Viet Thanh Nguyen turns fiction into criticism".)	Nguyen, Viet Thanh (2021). The committed. New York: Grove Press.

———————

Bibliography notes
