= Poehlman House (Syracuse, New York) =

Historic house in New York, United States

- U.S. National Register of Historic Places
- U.S. Historic district – Contributing property
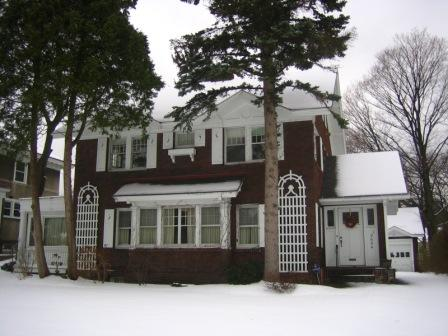

- Location within New York Location within the United States
- Interactive map showing the location of Poehlman House
- Location: 2654 E. Genesee St., Syracuse, New York
- Coordinates: 43°2′37.92″N 76°6′38.97″W
- Built: 1919
- Architect: Ward Wellington Ward
- Architectural style: Colonial Revival
- MPS: Architecture of Ward Wellington Ward in Syracuse MPS
- NRHP reference No.: 97000078
- Added to NRHP: February 14, 1997

Poehlman House, also known as Poehlman Residence, was designed by Ward Wellington Ward. It was added to the National Register of Historic Places in 1997. It is currently a private residence.

It was listed for its Colonial Revival and Arts and Crafts architecture. An Arts and Crafts style detail is the use of moon influences in the decorative shutters on the house. It is located in the Scottholm Tract Historic District.
