= Sanderson House (Scottholm Terrace, Syracuse, New York) =

Historic house in New York, United States

- Sanderson House--112 Scottholm Ter.
- U.S. National Register of Historic Places
- U.S. Historic district – Contributing property
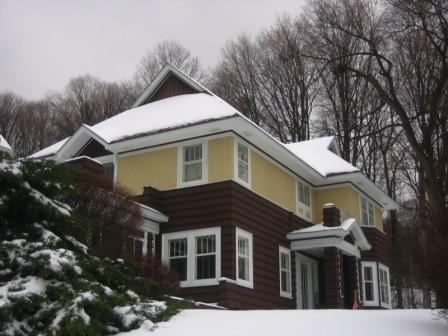

- Location within New York Location within the United States
- Interactive map showing the location of Sanderson House
- Location: 112 Scottholm Ter., Syracuse, New York
- Coordinates: 43°2′32.05″N 76°6′46.02″W
- Built: 1916
- Architect: Ward Wellington Ward
- MPS: Architecture of Ward Wellington Ward in Syracuse MPS
- NRHP reference No.: 97000085
- Added to NRHP: February 14, 1997

The Sanderson House, also known as Sanderson Residence, is a historic house located in Syracuse, New York. It was built in 1916. Along with other Ward Wellington Ward-designed homes, it was listed on the National Register of Historic Places in 1997.

It was built in 1916 for Amon F. Sanderson, an officer of the Scottholm Company which developed the Scottholm Tract in 1911. Sanderson also commissioned Sanderson House at 301 Scottholm Boulevard.

It was listed for its architecture. The house exemplifies Ward's Arts and Crafts style and also Prairie Style. It is one of five nearly identical homes in Syracuse designed by Ward. The others are at 464 Allen Street, 100 Berkeley Drive, 1917 West Colvin Street, and 116 Rugby Road. It is located in the Scottholm Tract Historic District and is currently a private residence.
