= Sanderson House (Scottholm Boulevard, Syracuse, New York) =

Historic house in New York, United States

- Sanderson House--301 Scottholm Blvd.
- U.S. National Register of Historic Places
- U.S. Historic district – Contributing property
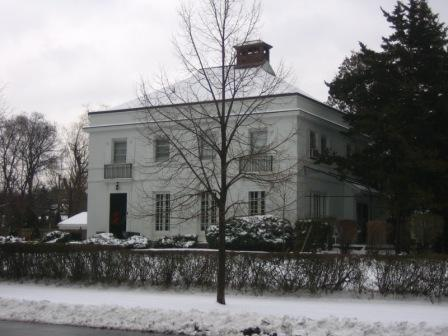

- Location within New York Location within the United States
- Interactive map showing the location of Sanderson House
- Location: 301 Scottholm Blvd., Syracuse, New York
- Coordinates: 43°2′32.3″N 76°6′33.43″W
- Built: 1922
- Architect: Ward Wellington Ward
- MPS: Architecture of Ward Wellington Ward in Syracuse MPS
- NRHP reference No.: 97000084
- Added to NRHP: February 14, 1997

Sanderson House is a Ward Wellington Ward-designed house in Syracuse, New York designed in the British Regency architectural style and built in 1924. The house is listed on the National Register of Historic Places. It was listed for its architecture.

The house was built for Amon F. Sanderson, an officer of the Scottholm Company which developed the Scottholm Tract in 1911. Sanderson also commissioned, for his own residence, Sanderson House at 112 Scottholm Terrace. It is located in the Scottholm Tract Historic District.

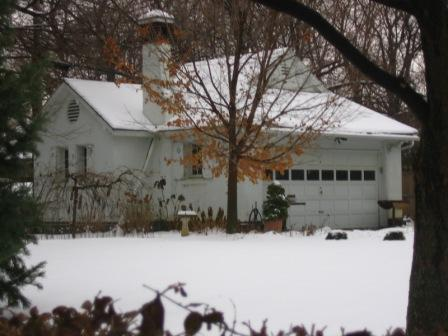
Matching garage
