= Dunfee House (Syracuse, New York) =

Historic house in New York, United States

- U.S. National Register of Historic Places
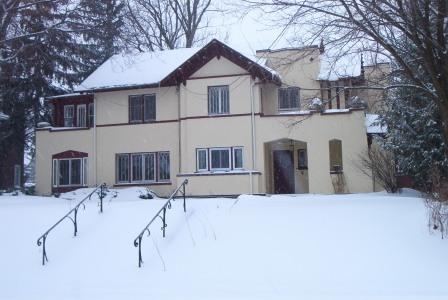

- Location within New York Location within the United States
- Location: 206 Summit Ave., Syracuse, New York
- Coordinates: 43°1′50.33″N 76°10′1.2″W
- Built: 1914
- Architect: Ward Wellington Ward
- MPS: Architecture of Ward Wellington Ward in Syracuse MPS
- NRHP reference No.: 97000092
- Added to NRHP: February 14, 1997

The Dunfee House, also known as the Dunfee Residence, in Syracuse, New York, was built in 1914. Along with the Sanford House across the street and other Ward Wellington Ward-designed homes, it was listed on the National Register of Historic Places in 1997.

The house is listed for its architecture.
