= Hunziker House (Syracuse, New York) =

Historic house in New York, United States

- U.S. National Register of Historic Places
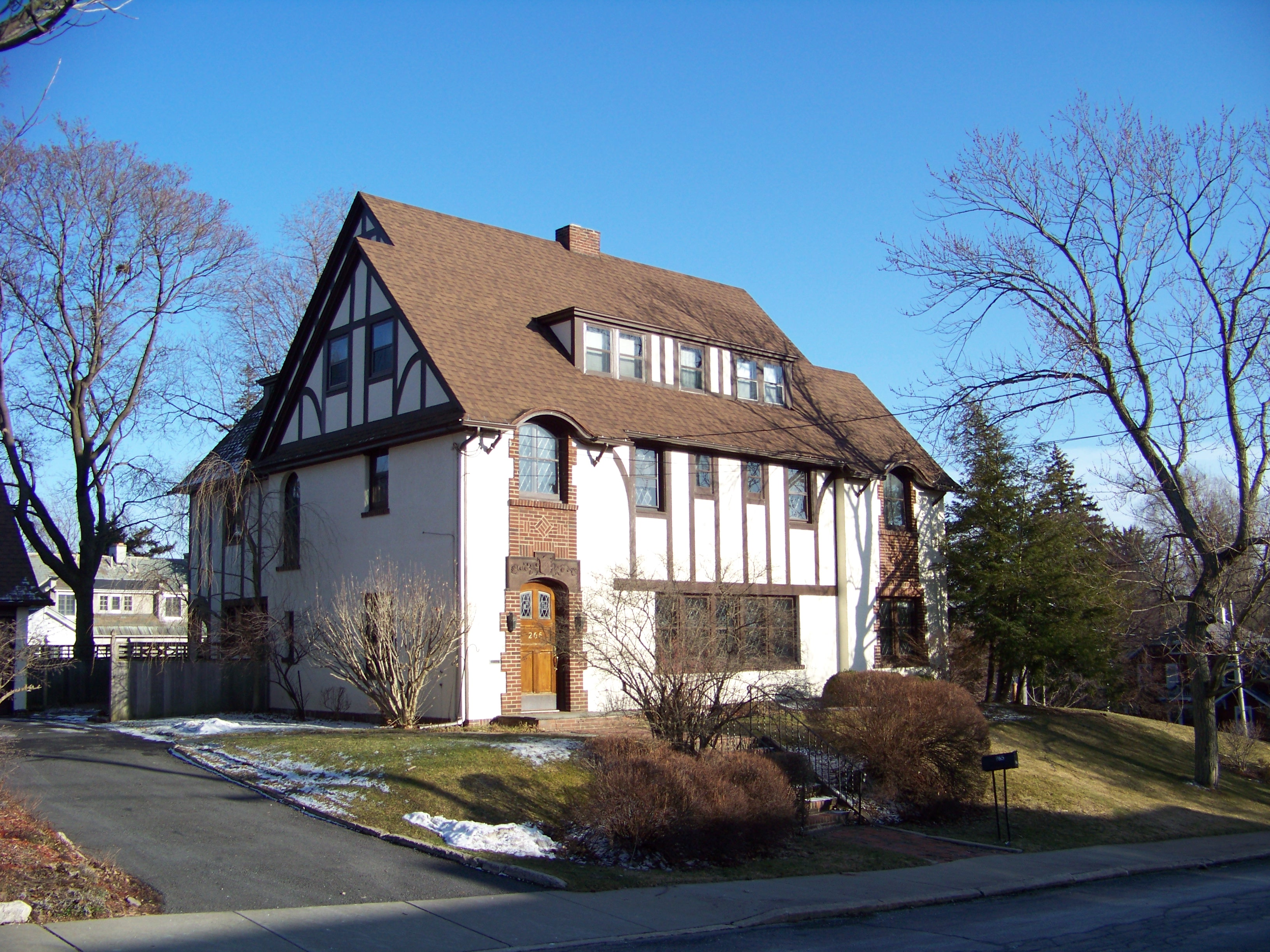

- Location within New York Location within the United States
- Interactive map showing the location for Hunziker House
- Location: 265 Robineau Rd., Syracuse, New York
- Coordinates: 43°1′22.65″N 76°10′15.6″W
- Built: 1926
- Architect: Ward Wellington Ward
- Architectural style: Tudor Revival
- MPS: Architecture of Ward Wellington Ward in Syracuse MPS
- NRHP reference No.: 97000087
- Added to NRHP: February 14, 1997

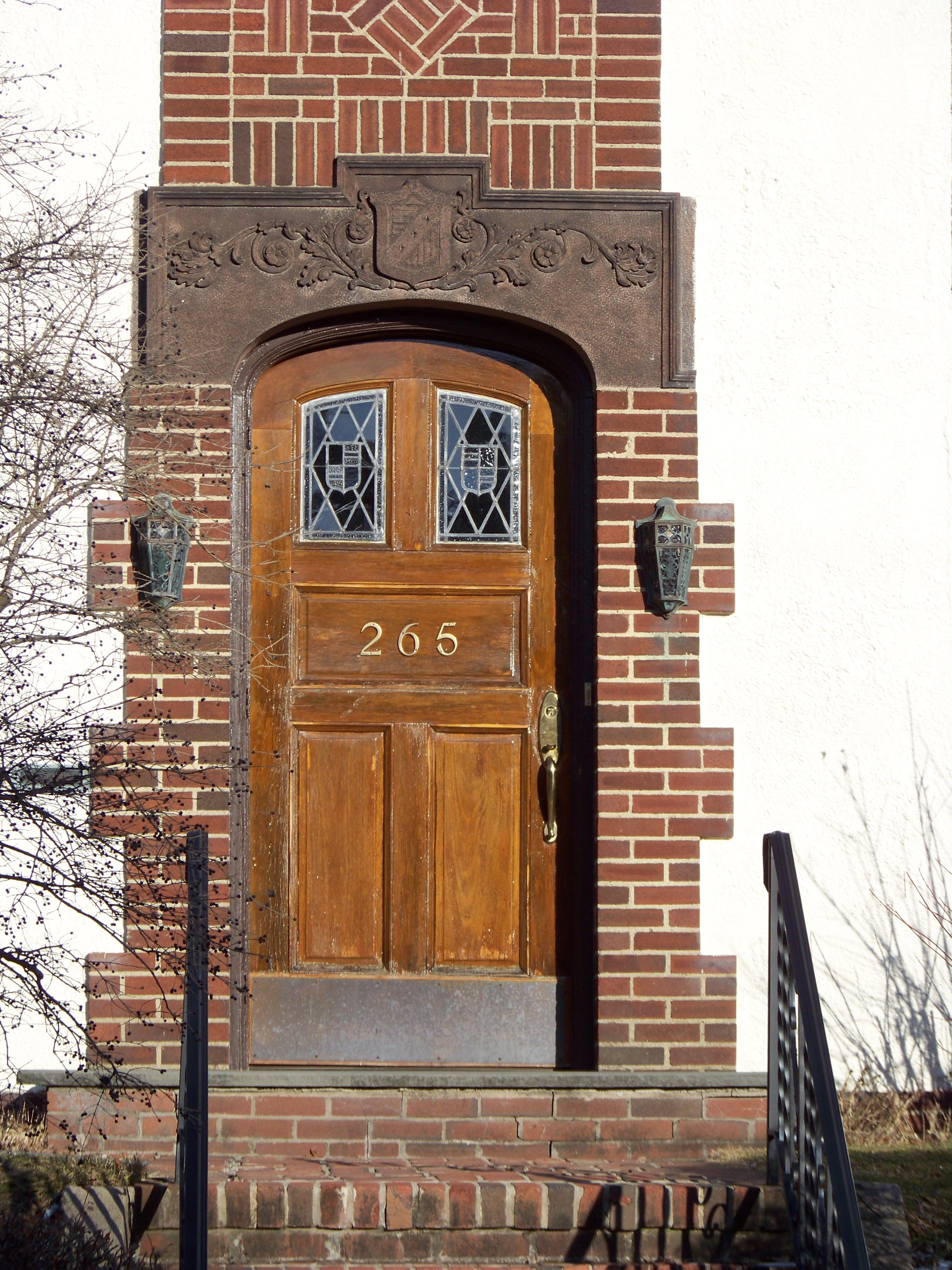
Door detail

Hunziker House or Hunziker Residence, in Syracuse, New York, was designed by Ward Wellington Ward and was built in 1926. It was listed on the National Register of Historic Places in 1997.

It was listed for its architecture.
