= White House (Syracuse, New York) =

Historic house in New York, United States

- U.S. National Register of Historic Places
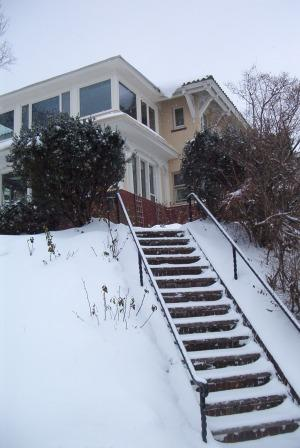

- Location within New York Location within the United States
- Interactive map showing the location of White House
- Location: 176 Robineau Rd., Syracuse, New York
- Coordinates: 43°1′34.75″N 76°10′22.29″W
- Built: 1919
- Architect: Ward Wellington Ward
- Architectural style: Renaissance
- MPS: Architecture of Ward Wellington Ward in Syracuse MPS
- NRHP reference No.: 97000083
- Added to NRHP: February 14, 1997

The White House, also known as White Residence, at 176 Robineau Road in Syracuse, New York was added to the National Register of Historic Places in 1997.

It was designed by Ward Wellington Ward.

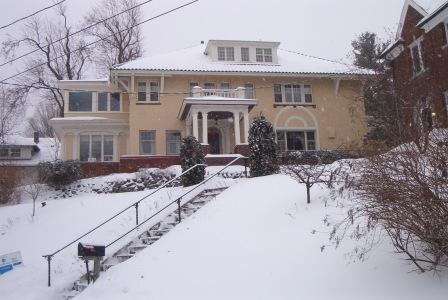

The house remains on a plot of .7-acre (2,800 m^{2}). It is currently a private residence.
