= Ward House (Syracuse, New York) =

Historic house in New York, United States

- U.S. National Register of Historic Places
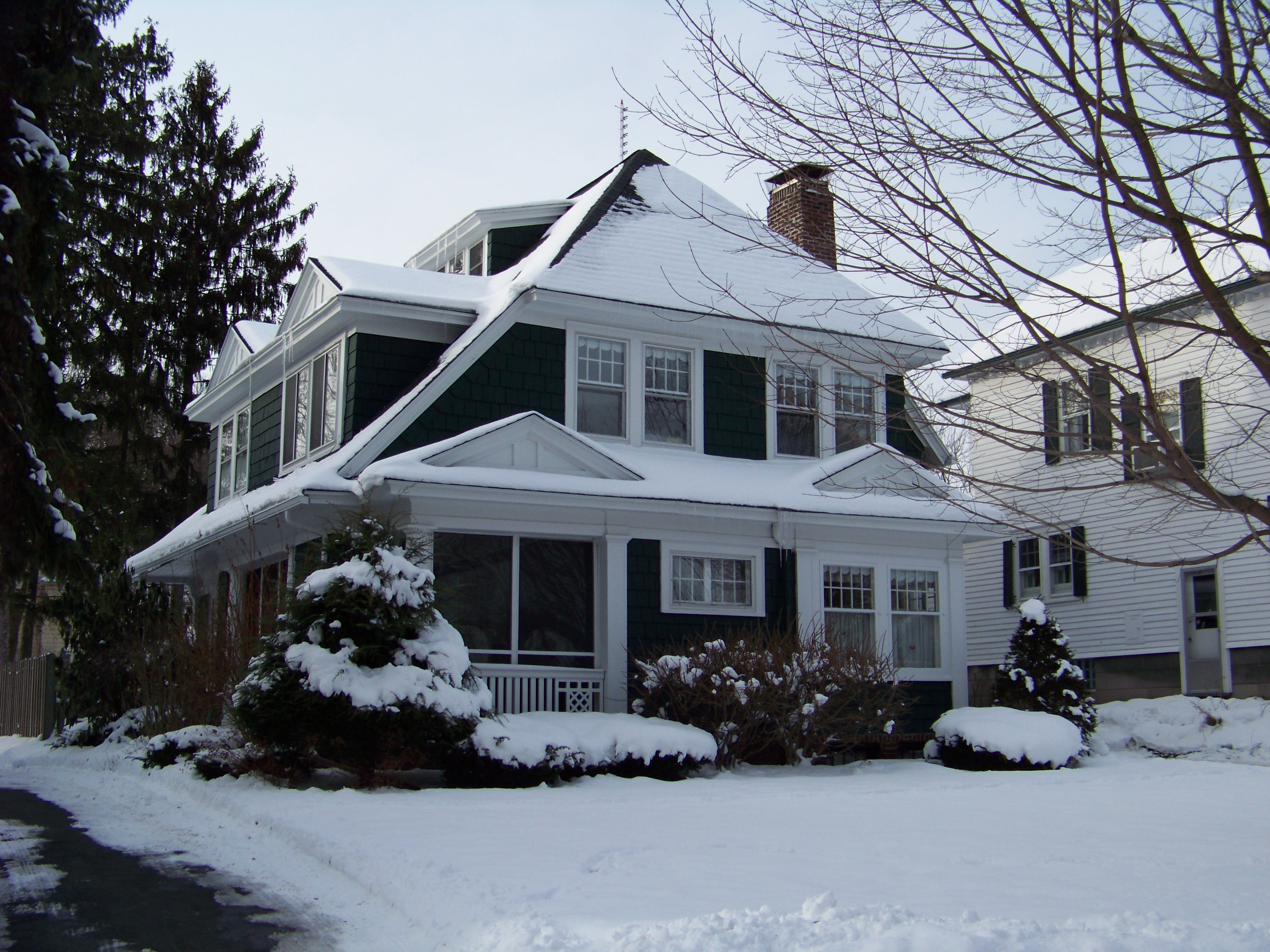

- Location within New York Location within the United States
- Location: 100 Circle Rd., Syracuse, New York
- Coordinates: 43°1′57.84″N 76°7′43.42″W
- Built: 1914
- Architect: Ward Wellington Ward
- MPS: Architecture of Ward Wellington Ward in Syracuse MPS
- NRHP reference No.: 97000069
- Added to NRHP: February 14, 1997

The Ward House in Syracuse, New York was designed in 1914 by architect Ward Wellington Ward. It was one of two speculative properties that Ward and his wife arranged to have built. Along with others of his works, it was listed on the National Register of Historic Places in 1997.
