= Spencer House (Syracuse, New York) =

Historic house in New York, United States

- U.S. National Register of Historic Places
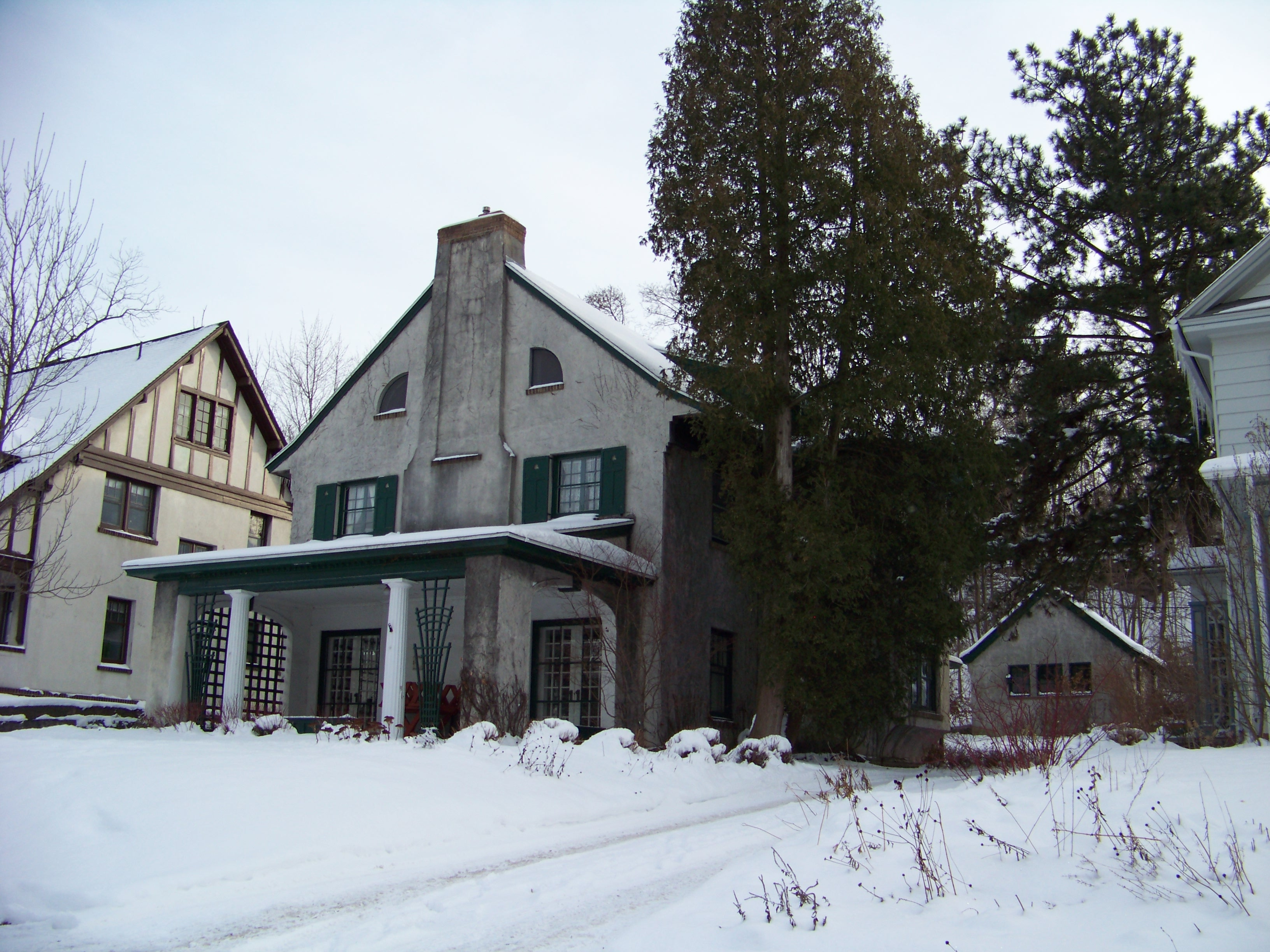

- Location within New York Location within the United States
- Interactive map showing the location for Spencer House
- Location: 114 Dorset Rd., Syracuse, New York
- Coordinates: 43°1′58.53″N 76°7′36.01″W
- Built: 1913
- Architect: Ward Wellington Ward
- Architectural style: Colonial Revival
- MPS: Architecture of Ward Wellington Ward in Syracuse MPS
- NRHP reference No.: 97000074
- Added to NRHP: February 14, 1997

Spencer House, also known as Spencer Residence, located in Syracuse, New York was built in 1913. Along with other Ward Wellington Ward-designed homes, it was listed on the National Register of Historic Places in 1997. It is currently a private residence.
