= Wellington House (Fayetteville, New York) =

Historic house in New York, United States

- Charles Estabrook Mansion
- U.S. National Register of Historic Places
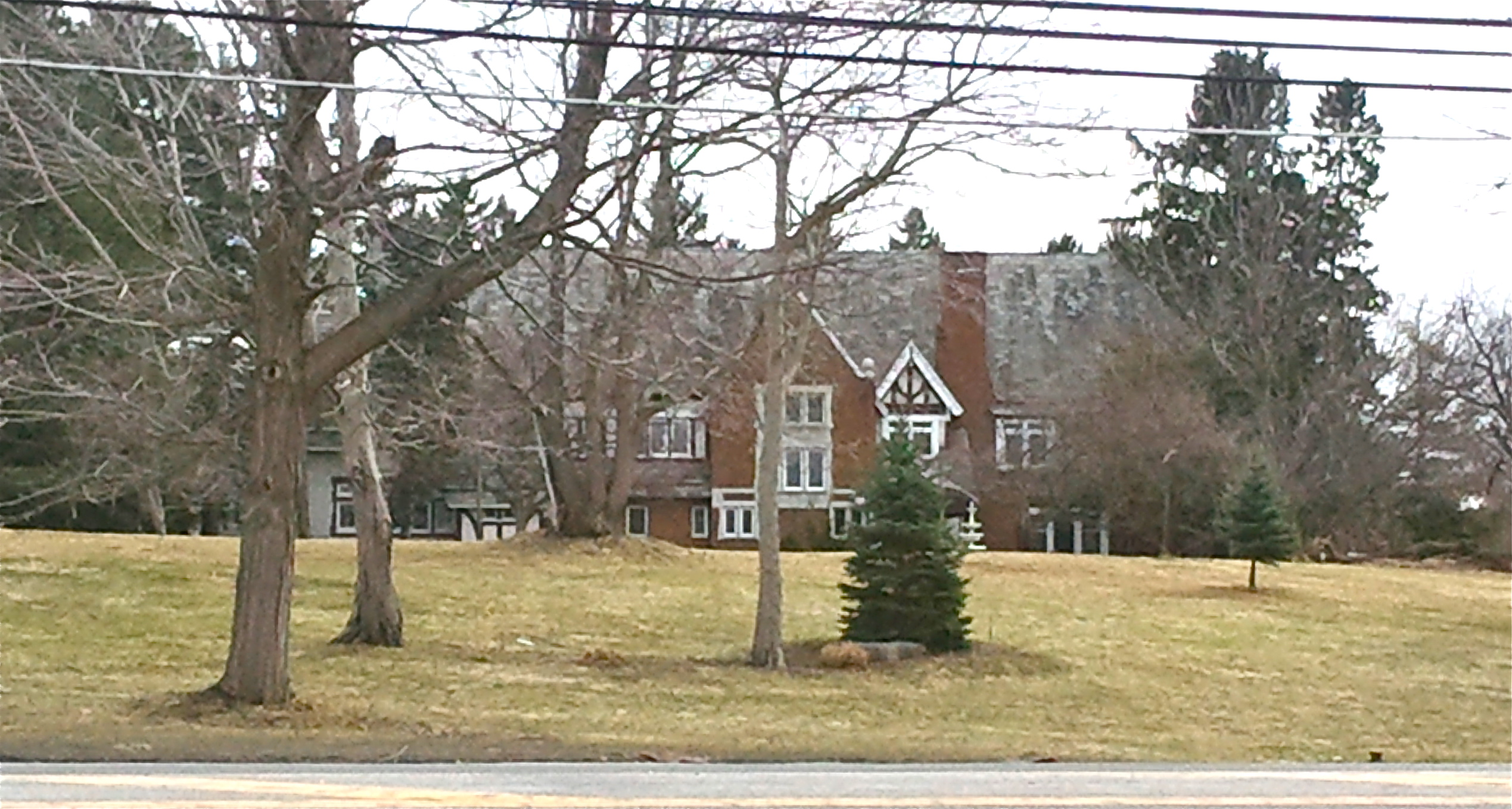

- Location within New York Location within the United States
- Location: 7262 E. Genesee St., Fayetteville, New York
- Coordinates: 43°1′42″N 76°1′16″W
- Area: 11 acres (4.5 ha)
- Built: 1922
- Architect: Ward, Ward Wellington
- Architectural style: Tudor Revival
- NRHP reference No.: 96000487
- Added to NRHP: April 26, 1996

Wellington House, also known as Charles Estabrook Mansion, is a historic home located at Fayetteville, Onondaga County, New York. It was designed by Ward Wellington Ward built in 1922–1923. The main house is a two-story, brick, stone, and half-timber Tudor Revival style mansion topped by a prominent slate roof. It features a Tudor-arched front porch and stone portal. In addition to the main house, the property includes the contributing gardener's residence; combined garage, stables, and greenhouse building; formal garden; brick gateway; two small utility buildings; and the original curving drive.

It was listed on the National Register of Historic Places in 1996.
