= Stowell House (Syracuse, New York) =

Historic house in New York, United States

- U.S. National Register of Historic Places
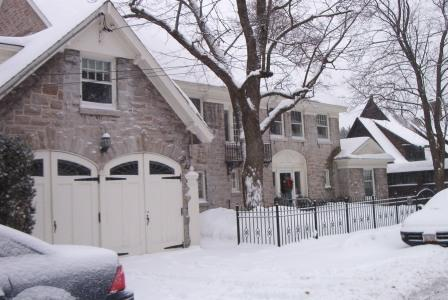

- Location within New York Location within the United States
- Location: 225 Robineau Rd., Syracuse, New York
- Coordinates: 43°1′31.44″N 76°10′16.35″W
- Built: 1919
- Architect: Ward Wellington Ward
- Architectural style: Colonial Revival
- MPS: Architecture of Ward Wellington Ward in Syracuse MPS
- NRHP reference No.: 97000086
- Added to NRHP: February 14, 1997

Stowell House, also known as Stowell Residence, at 225 Robineau Road in Syracuse, New York, is a home designed by Ward Wellington Ward. It may be the only stone house designed by Ward and also included in the Ward MPS.

It was listed on the National Register of Historic Places in 1997.
