= Harry N. Burhans House =

Historic house in New York, United States

- U.S. National Register of Historic Places
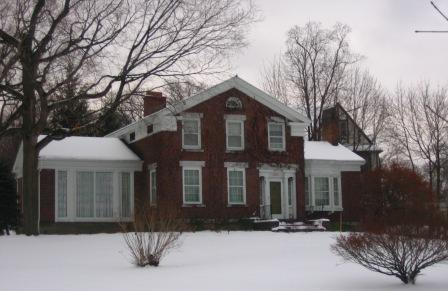
- View from E. Genesee Street

- Location within New York Location within the United States
- Interactive map showing the location of Harry N. Burhans House
- Location: 2627 E. Genesee St., Syracuse, New York
- Coordinates: 43°2′48″N 76°6′40″W
- Built: 1837
- Architect: Ward, Ward Wellington
- Architectural style: Greek Revival, Late 19th And 20th Century Revivals
- MPS: Architecture of Ward Wellington Ward in Syracuse MPS
- NRHP reference No.: 07000868
- Added to NRHP: August 30, 2007

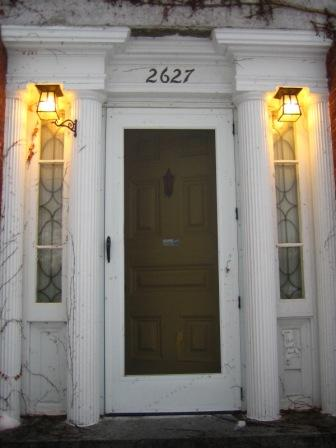
Front door detail

The Harry N. Burhans House is a historic Greek Revival house in the Salt Springs area of Syracuse, New York. With a wide lawn, it commands the intersection of old roads Salt Springs Road and East Genesee Street, the latter being one of the main roads of the area. Built in 1837 on a 100-acre (0.40 km^{2}) plot, it was the first house in the area.

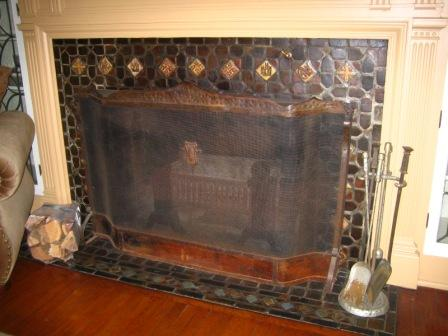
One of the Mercer fireplaces

In 1916, the house was renovated under supervision of architect Ward Wellington Ward. The renovation added four Mercer fireplaces. The house was listed on the National Register of Historic Places in 2007.

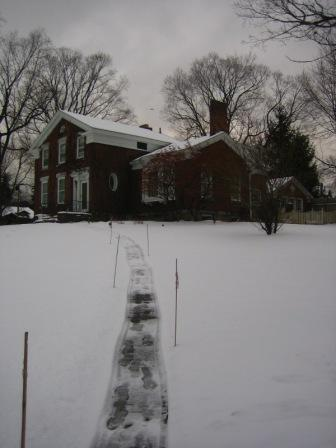
View from Salt Springs Road

The house remains now on a plot of approximately 0.66-acre (2,700 m^{2}).

== See also ==
- List of Registered Historic Places in Syracuse, New York
