= Hoeffer House (Syracuse, New York) =

Historic house in New York, United States

- U.S. National Register of Historic Places
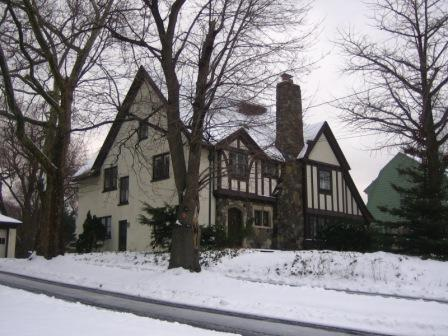

- Location within New York Location within the United States
- Interactive map showing the location for Hoeffler House
- Location: 2669 E. Genesee St., Syracuse, New York
- Coordinates: 43°2′39.57″N 76°6′36.35″W
- Built: 1923
- Architect: Ward Wellington Ward
- Architectural style: Tudor Revival
- MPS: Architecture of Ward Wellington Ward in Syracuse MPS
- NRHP reference No.: 97000079
- Added to NRHP: February 14, 1997

Hoeffer House, also known as the Hoeffler Residence, in Syracuse, New York, was listed on the National Register of Historic Places in 1997. It was designed by Ward Wellington Ward and was built in 1923.

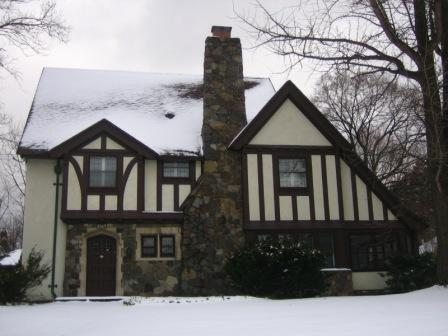

It was listed for its architecture.
