= Porter House (Syracuse, New York) =

Historic house in New York, United States

- U.S. National Register of Historic Places
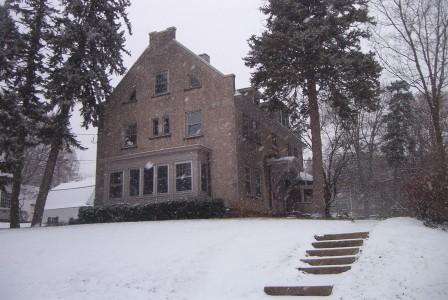

- Location within New York Location within the United States
- Location: 106 Strathmore Dr., Syracuse, New York
- Coordinates: 43°2′4.51″N 76°7′47.3″W
- Built: 1909
- Architect: Ward Wellington Ward
- Architectural style: Colonial Revival, Bungalow/craftsman
- MPS: Architecture of Ward Wellington Ward in Syracuse MPS
- NRHP reference No.: 97000091
- Added to NRHP: February 14, 1997

Porter House, also known as Porter Residence, in Syracuse, New York, is a home designed by Ward Wellington Ward. It was listed on the National Register of Historic Places in 1997 for its architecture.
