= Welsh House (Syracuse, New York) =

Historic house in New York, United States

- U.S. National Register of Historic Places
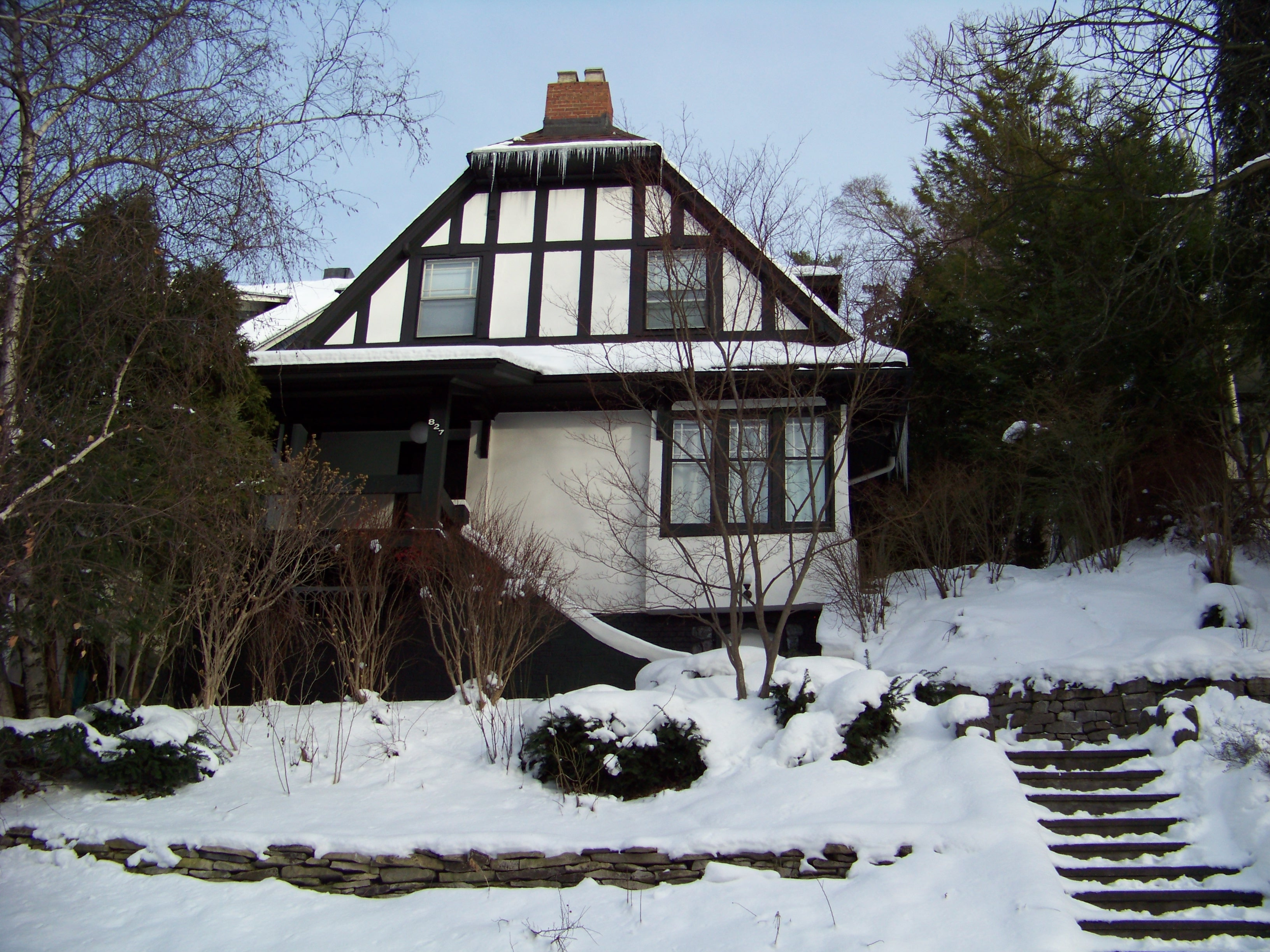

- Location within New York Location within the United States
- Interactive map showing the location of Welsh House
- Location: 827 Lancaster Ave., Syracuse, New York
- Coordinates: 43°2′6.05″N 76°7′23.03″W
- Built: 1912
- Architect: Ward Wellington Ward
- Architectural style: Tudor Revival
- MPS: Architecture of Ward Wellington Ward in Syracuse MPS
- NRHP reference No.: 97000081
- Added to NRHP: February 14, 1997

The Welsh House, also known as Welsh Residence in Syracuse, New York was built in 1912. It was listed, along with other Ward Wellington Ward-designed homes, on the National Register of Historic Places in 1997.
