= Louis and Celia Skoler Residence =

Historic house in New York, United States

- U.S. National Register of Historic Places
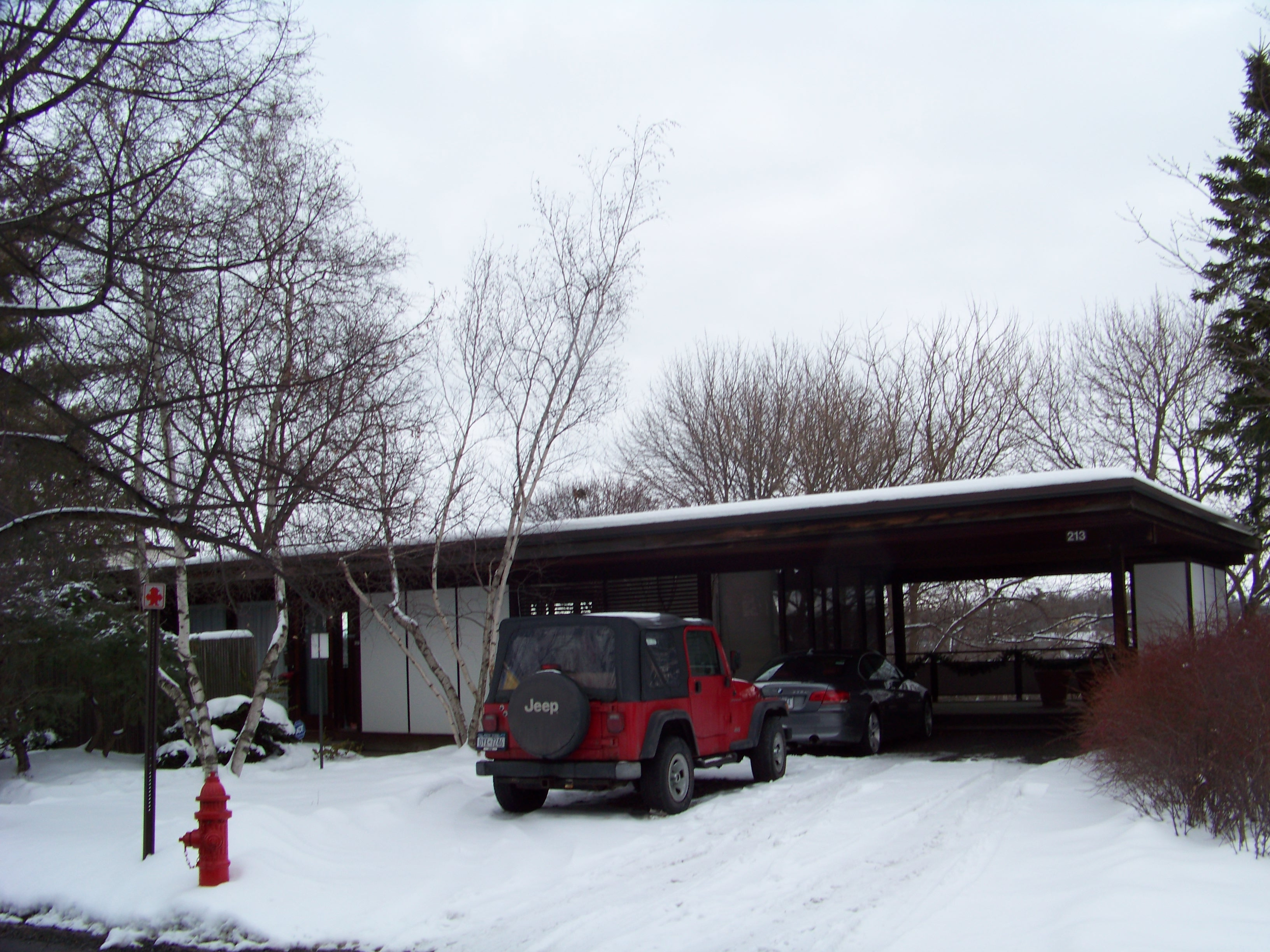

- Location within New York
- Location: 213 Scottholm Terrace, Syracuse, New York
- Coordinates: 43°2′26.92″N 76°6′42.1″W
- NRHP reference No.: 10000013
- Added to NRHP: February 12, 2010

The Louis and Celia Skoler Residence, at 213 Scottholm Terrace in Syracuse, New York, was listed on the National Register of Historic Places on February 12, 2010.

The property was listed by the Common Council of the City of Syracuse as a Syracuse protected site on November 7, 2005.

Louis Skoler (died 2008) was an architect who held a Cornell University degree and was a professor emeritus of Syracuse University. The career of Louis Skoler is documented in a Syracuse University Archives collection.
