= Clark House (Syracuse, New York) =

Historic house in New York, United States

- U.S. National Register of Historic Places
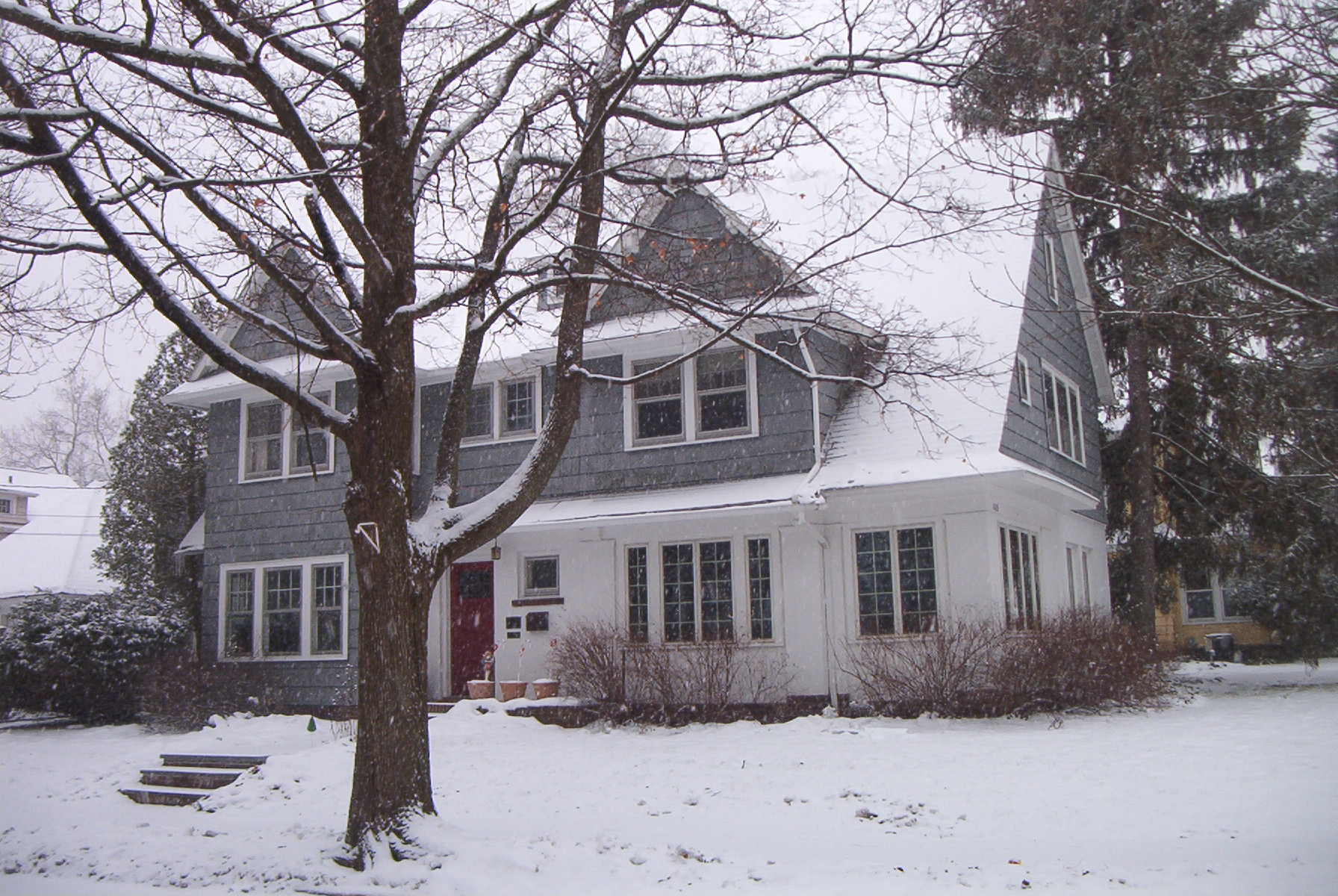

- Location within New York Location within the United States
- Interactive map showing the location of Clark House
- Location: 105 Strathmore Dr., Syracuse, New York
- Coordinates: 43°1′20.32″N 76°10′12.91″W
- Built: 1919
- Architect: Ward Wellington Ward
- MPS: Architecture of Ward Wellington Ward in Syracuse MPS
- NRHP reference No.: 97000090
- Added to NRHP: February 14, 1997

The Clark House is a Ward Wellington Ward-designed home in Syracuse, New York that was listed on the National Register of Historic Places in 1997. It is currently a private residence.

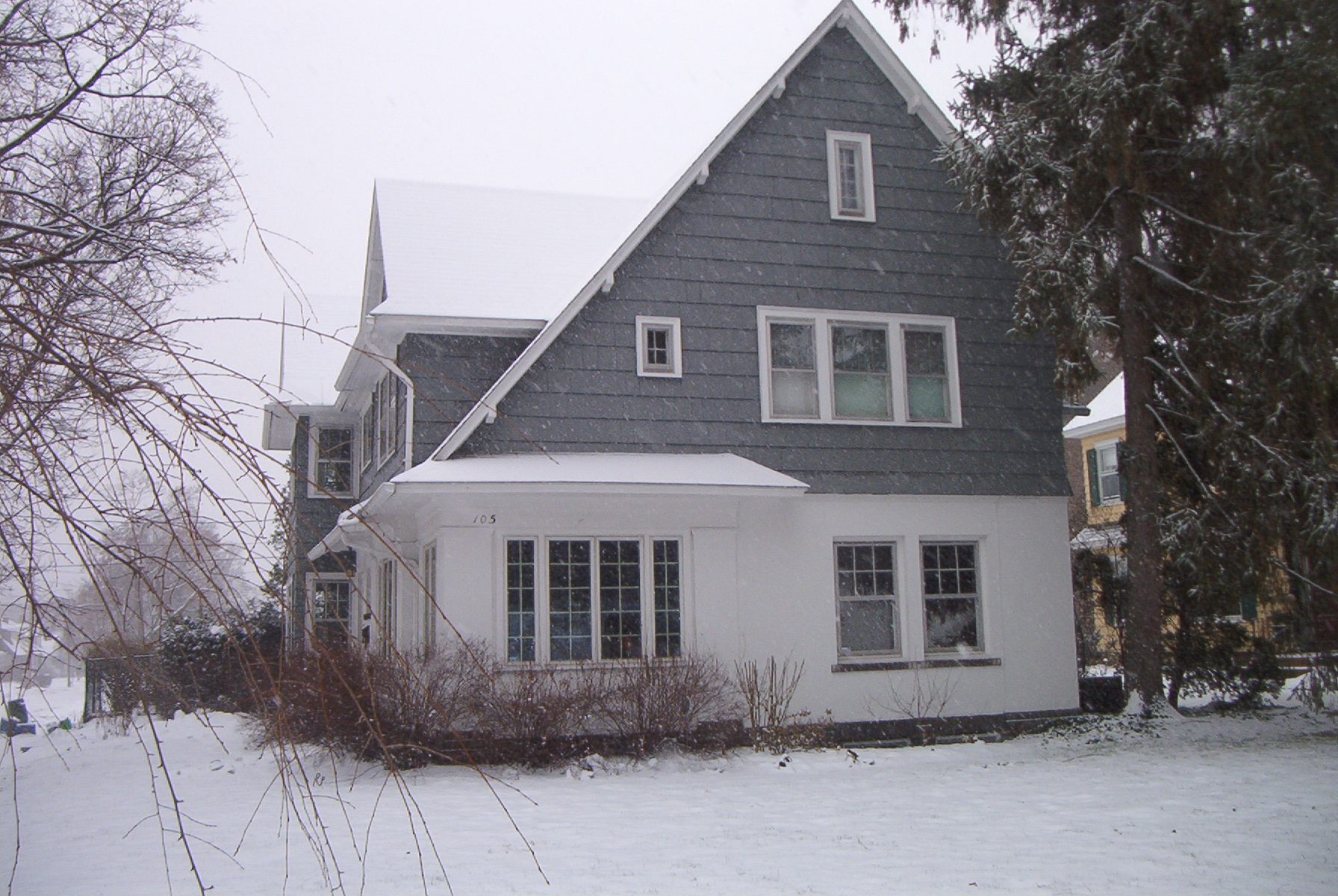
Side view

The house was listed for its architecture.
