= Fairchild House (Syracuse, New York) =

Historic house in New York, United States

- U.S. National Register of Historic Places
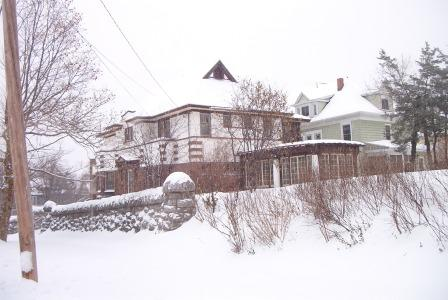

- Location within New York Location within the United States
- Location: 111 Clairmonte Ave., Syracuse, New York
- Coordinates: 43°1′57.17″N 76°10′10.69″W
- Built: 1914
- Architect: Ward Wellington Ward
- Architectural style: Prairie School
- MPS: Architecture of Ward Wellington Ward in Syracuse MPS
- NRHP reference No.: 97000070
- Added to NRHP: February 14, 1997

Fairchild House, also known as the Fairchild Residence, is a Ward Wellington Ward-designed home in Syracuse, New York. It was listed on the National Register of Historic Places in 1997.

It is listed for its architecture.

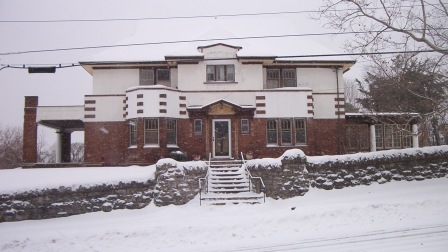

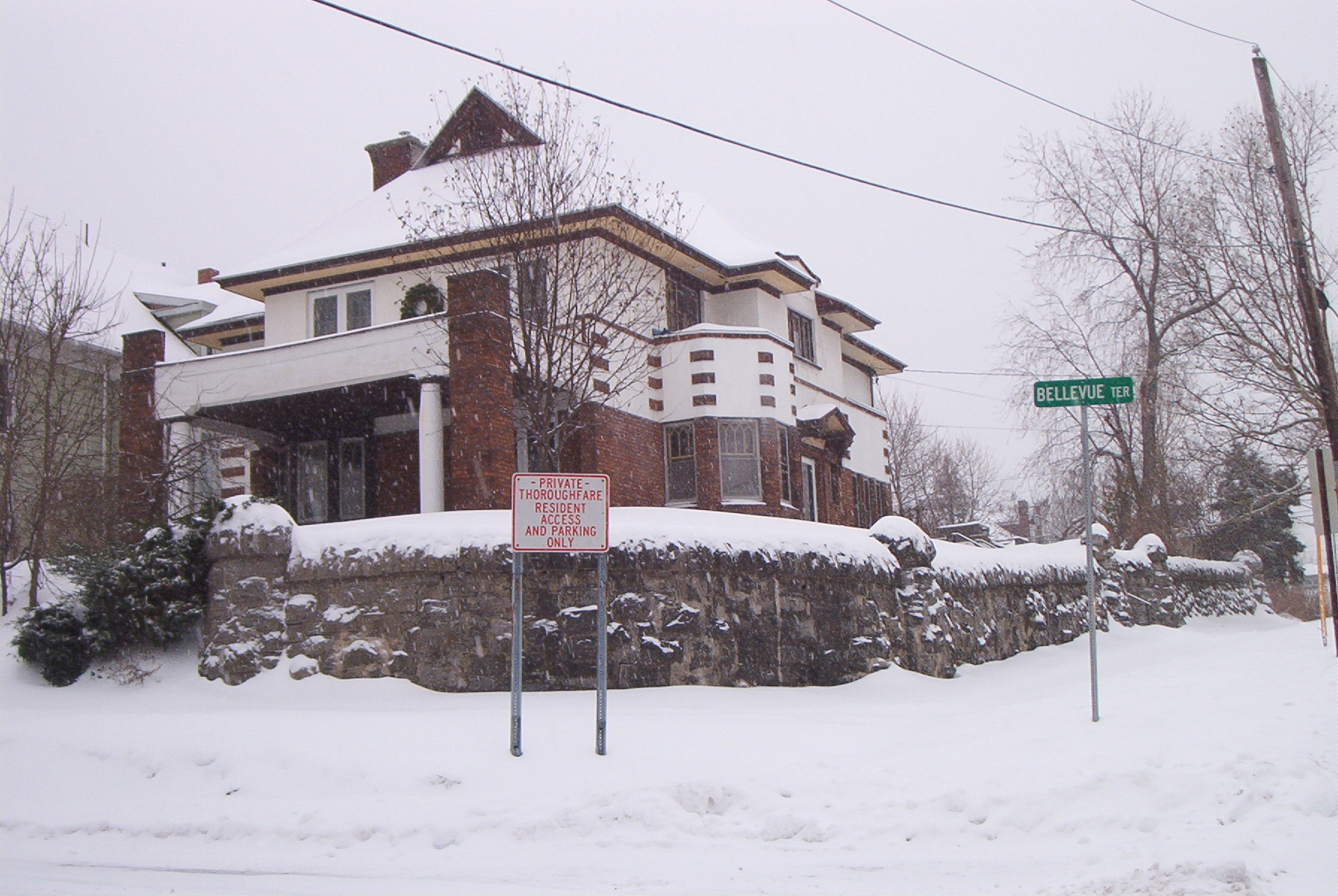
House and garage

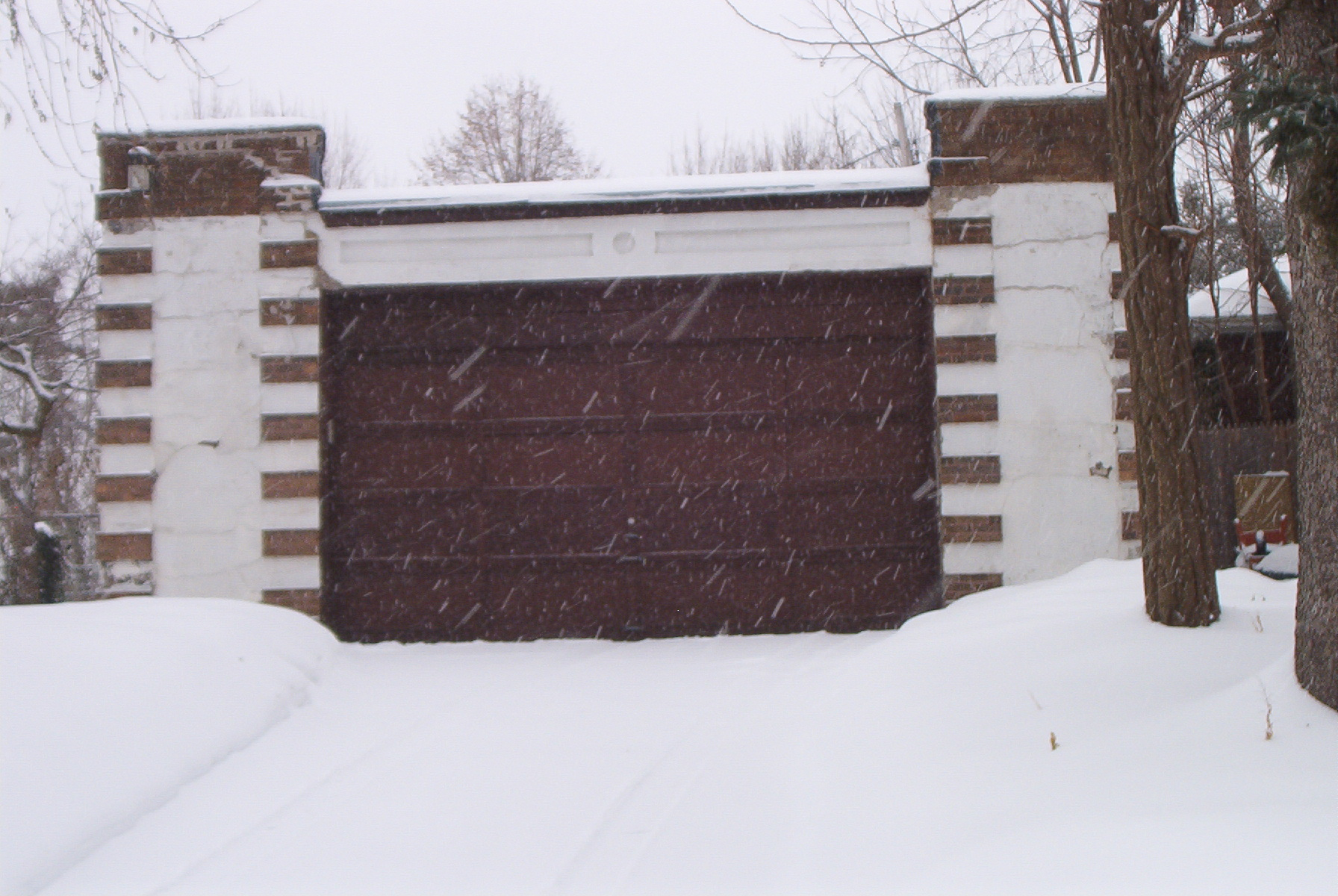
Matching garage
