= Sanford House (Syracuse, New York) =

Historic house in New York, United States

- U.S. National Register of Historic Places
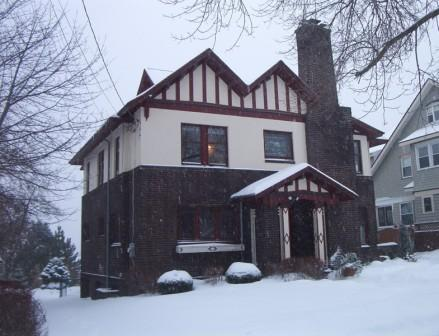

- Location within New York Location within the United States
- Location: 211 Summit Ave., Syracuse, New York
- Coordinates: 43°1′49.73″N 76°9′58.97″W
- Built: 1913
- Architect: Ward Wellington Ward
- Architectural style: Tudor Revival
- MPS: Architecture of Ward Wellington Ward in Syracuse MPS
- NRHP reference No.: 97000075
- Added to NRHP: February 14, 1997

Sanford House, also known as Sanford Residence, is a historic home designed by Ward Wellington Ward and built in 1913. It was listed on the National Register of Historic Places in 1997.

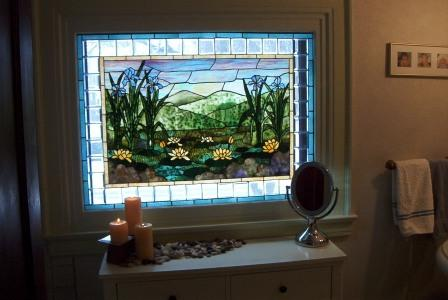
Window, upstairs

It was listed for its architecture.

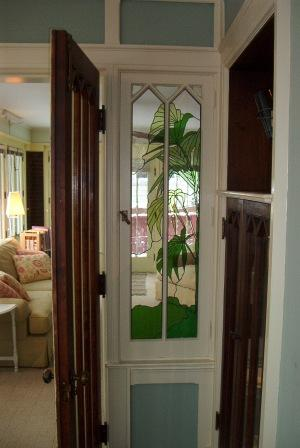
Window, interior doorway
