= Ward Wellington Ward =

American architect

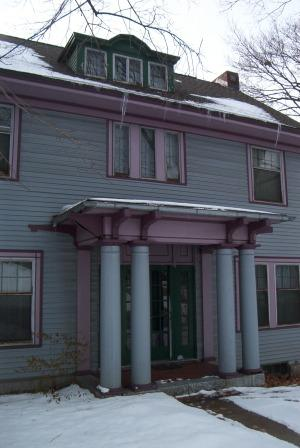
- Exterior detail of the Chapman House in Syracuse, completed in 1913
- Born: July 26, 1875; Chicago, Illinois, United States
- Died: August 6, 1932 (aged 57); Willard, New York
- Occupation: Architect
- Practice: Ward Wellington Ward
- Design: Lemoyne Manor, his studio and home

Ward Wellington Ward (1875–1932) was an American architect who worked mostly in Syracuse, New York. He designed more than 250 buildings, of which more than 120 were built and survive. He was influenced by, and contributed to, the Arts and Crafts movement in architecture. Ward's work is in varying styles, but the houses most typically include crafts-like details such as decorative cutouts in shutters. His designs almost always include garages, gateways, and other small structures like gazebos.

== Syracuse architect ==
Ward was born in Chicago. His decision to live and work in Syracuse was influenced by the presence of Gustav Stickley in Syracuse, who promoted the "Craftsman"-style of architecture, furniture, and other decorative arts in his magazine, The Craftsman. Gustav Stickley's own home in Syracuse is regarded as having the first Craftsman style residential interior dating to 1902 in the United States. Ward's wife's family was also in the Syracuse area.

Ward worked with Horatio Nelson White in Syracuse for a short time.

Ward's homes in Syracuse are concentrated in several neighborhoods which were upscale at the time of their development: Strathmore, Scottholm, Berkeley Park, and Sedgwick Farms.

He designed other buildings in Syracuse, too, and outside Syracuse he designed buildings including Mohegan Manor in Baldwinsville, New York, originally built for the Independent Order of Odd Fellows and now used as a restaurant, and the Charles Estabrook Mansion.

== Master craftsmen ==
His work was part of an international movement, which used quality materials and "considered workmanship both an art and a craft." Ward discovered two master craftsmen early in his career; Henry Keck, who designed stained glass windows, and Henry Mercer, who made Moravian handcrafted tiles in Doylestown, Pennsylvania. Ward used the tiles to decorate the face of wood-burning fireplaces.

== Personal life ==
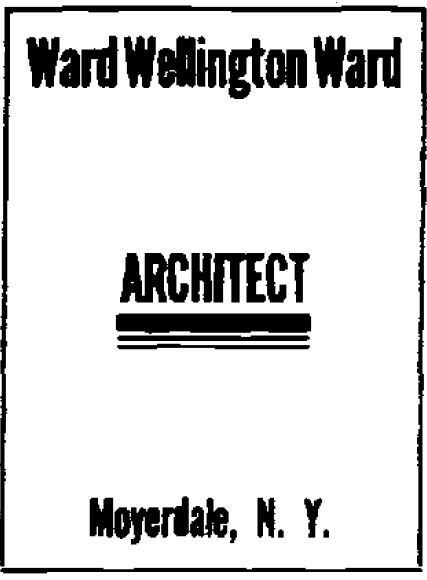
Ward Wellington Ward - Architect - Moyerdale - Syracuse Post-Standard, December 16, 1911

He was married to Maude Moyer who was the daughter of local carriage and automobile manufacturer, Harvey A. Moyer and Rosamond Wilcox. She was raised in Liverpool, New York. The two met while she was attending the Boston Conservatory of Music in Boston, Massachusetts and he was attending Massachusetts Institute of Technology.

Ward remodeled a farmhouse for his father-in-law, Harvey A. Moyer on Old Liverpool Road called Moyerdale and designed plans for a factory for the Moyer company on Wolf Street that is still in existence. In 1916, Ward built a home on a 5-acre (20,000 m^{2}) lot overlooking Onondaga Lake and named it LeMoyne Manor.

The couple had one daughter, Peggy Ward Forgan, who relocated to Enumclaw, Washington after marriage to Peter Paul Forgan.

He died in 1932 and Maude Moyer Ward later sold the house and moved to a house on her parents' Moyerdale property. She died in 1961. The Ward home was later brought out and changed into a restaurant and motel, but still resembles the original structure. Sadly, on August 29, 2018, LeMoyne Manor was demolished by the current owners of the property.

== Memorials ==
Upon his death in 1932, Ward's remains were buried in the Moyer family plot in Woodlawn Cemetery, Grant Boulevard, Syracuse, in a lot unmarked by a stone. A headstone was placed on Ward's grave in a public ceremony on October 20, 2002, by members of the Arts and Crafts Society of Central New York.

== National Register of Historic Places ==
Twenty-six homes and two other buildings designed by Ward and located within the city of Syracuse were listed on the National Register of Historic Places on February 14, 1997, as a result of the Architecture of Ward Wellington Ward in Syracuse MPS, a Multiple Property Submission to the National Register. Listed properties are:

1. Ashton House, 301 Salt Springs Rd.
2. John G. Ayling House, 223 DeWitt St.
3. Blanchard House, 329 Westcott Ave.
4. Chapman House, 518 Danforth St.
5. Clark House, 105 Strathmore Drive, Strathmore
6. Collins House, 2201 E. Genesee St.
7. Dunfee House, 206 Summit Ave.
8. Estabrook House, 819 Comstock Ave.
9. Fairchild House, 111 Clairmont Ave, Strathmore
10. Fuller House, 215 Salt Springs Rd.
11. Gang House, 707 Danforth Street; built in 1914 and currently used as a bed and breakfast
12. Garrett House, 110 Highland St.
13. Hoeffer House, 2669 E. Genesee St.
14. Hunziker House, 265 Robineau Road, Strathmore
15. Kelly House, 2205 E. Genesee St.
16. Poehlman House, 2654 E. Genesee St.
17. Porter House, 106 Strathmore Drive, Strathmore
18. Sanderson House at 112 Scottholm Terrace
19. Sanderson House at 301 Scottholm Boulevard
20. Sanford House, 211 Summit Ave, Strathmore
21. Alton Simmons House, 309 Van Rensselaer St.
22. Spencer House, 114 Dorset Rd.
23. Stowell House, 225 Robineau Road, Strathmore
24. Ward House, 100 Circle Rd.
25. Welsh House, 827 Lancaster Ave.
26. White House, 176 Robineau Road, Strathmore
27. Ziegler House, 1035 Oak St.

Two other multi-unit buildings were also listed:

1. Former Beta Theta Pi fraternity house (now Theta Chi fraternity house), 711 Comstock Ave.
2. Sherbrook Apartments, 600-604 Walnut Ave.

== See also ==
- National Register of Historic Places listings in Syracuse, New York
- Walnut Park Historic District
