= National Register of Historic Places listings in Syracuse, New York =

The National Register of Historic Places listings in Syracuse, New York are described below. There are 126 listed properties and districts in the city of Syracuse, including 19 business or public buildings, 13 historic districts, 6 churches, four school or university buildings, three parks, six apartment buildings, and 43 houses. Twenty-nine of the listed houses were designed by architect Ward Wellington Ward; 25 of these were listed as a group in 1996.

The more than 50 properties and districts in Onondaga County outside Syracuse are listed in National Register of Historic Places listings in Onondaga County, New York. One property, the New York State Barge Canal, spans both the city and the county. The locations of National Register properties and districts with known coordinates can be viewed in map form.

This National Park Service list is complete through NPS recent listings posted November 6, 2026.

Contents: Counties in New York
Albany (Albany) – Allegany – Bronx – Broome – Cattaraugus – Cayuga – Chautauqua – Chemung – Chenango – Clinton – Columbia – Cortland – Delaware – Dutchess (Poughkeepsie, Rhinebeck) – Erie (Buffalo) – Essex – Franklin – Fulton – Genesee – Greene – Hamilton – Herkimer – Jefferson – Kings – Lewis – Livingston – Madison – Monroe (Rochester) – Montgomery – Nassau – New York (Below 14th Street, 14th to 59th Streets, 59th to 110th Streets, Above 110th Street, Islands) – Niagara (Niagara Falls) – Oneida – Onondaga (Syracuse) – Ontario – Orange – Orleans – Oswego – Otsego – Putnam – Queens – Rensselaer – Richmond – Rockland – St. Lawrence – Saratoga – Schenectady – Schoharie – Schuyler – Seneca – Steuben – Suffolk – Sullivan – Tioga – Tompkins – Ulster – Warren – Washington – Wayne – Westchester (Northern, Southern, New Rochelle, Peekskill, Yonkers) – Wyoming – Yates

KEY

^{W}	covered in "Architecture of Ward Wellington Ward in Syracuse MPS"
^{L}	covered in "The Historic Designed Landscapes of Syracuse, New York MPS"
	NRHP-listed
^{∞}	NRHP-listed Historic district

== Current listings in Syracuse ==
	Name on the Register	Image	Date listed	Location	Neighborhood	Description
1	Amos Block	Amos Block	November 16, 1978 (#78001890)	210-216 West Water Street; 43°03′02″N 76°09′17″W	Downtown	Romanesque Revival building formerly fronting on the Erie Canal, from which goods were loaded and unloaded from boats
2	Amphion Piano Player Factory	Amphion Piano Player Factory	March 17, 2023 (#100008717)	689 North Clinton and 156 Solar Sts. 43°03′31″N 76°09′26″W		
3	Armory Square Historic District	Armory Square Historic District	September 7, 1984 (#84002816)	S. Clinton, S. Franklin, Walton, W. Fayette, and W. Jefferson Sts. 43°02′49″N 76°09′18″W	Downtown	Historic district in downtown Syracuse, around the Syracuse Armory, which was revitalized in the 1990s; includes the separately listed Loew's State Theater
4	Ashton House^{W}	Ashton House	February 14, 1997 (#97000089)	301 Salt Springs Rd. 43°02′43″N 76°06′37″W	Salt Springs / Meadowbrook	House designed by architect Ward Wellington Ward, included in set of Ward-designed houses covered in one Multiple Property Submission
5	John G. Ayling House	John G. Ayling House	May 6, 2011 (#11000277)	223 DeWitt St. 43°03′47″N 76°08′02″W	Sedgwick	
6	Babcock-Shattuck House	Babcock-Shattuck House	May 12, 2004 (#04000429)	2000-2004 E. Genesee St. 43°02′43″N 76°07′11″W	Westcott / Near Eastside	Queen Anne-style large house, formerly a post of the Jewish War Veterans of the United States of America
7	Barnes-Hiscock House	Barnes-Hiscock House	July 30, 2010 (#10000512)	930 James St. 43°03′26″N 76°08′12″W	Near Northeast	
8	Bellevue Country Club	Bellevue Country Club	February 5, 2014 (#13001154)	1901 Glenwood Ave. 43°01′37″N 76°11′35″W	Syracuse	
9	Berkeley Park Subdivision Historic District	Berkeley Park Subdivision Historic District	February 20, 2002 (#02000055)	Roughly bounded by Strattford St., Ackerman Ave., Morningside Cemetery, and Comstock Ave. 43°01′55″N 76°07′38″W	University Neighborhood	Residential subdivision, representative of early twentieth century landscape architectural design Includes multiple houses designed by Ward Wellington Ward.
10	Blanchard House^{W}	Blanchard House	February 14, 1997 (#97000094)	329 Westcott St. 43°02′39″N 76°07′10″W	Westcott	House, arbor and garage designed by architect Ward Wellington Ward, included in set of Ward-designed houses covered in one Multiple Property Submission
11	Alexander Brown House	Alexander Brown House	November 3, 1988 (#88002376)	726 W. Onondaga St. 43°02′12″N 76°09′45″W	Near Westside / Southwest	Romanesque Revival sandstone and tile home of Alexander T. Brown, successful inventor and manufacturer
12	Buildings at 500 and 506 Erie Boulevard East	Buildings at 500 and 506 Erie Boulevard East	January 24, 2023 (#100008621)	500 and 506 Erie Blvd. East; 43°03′03″N 76°08′43″W		Former home of the Smith Restaurant Supply Company
13	Harry N. Burhans House	Harry N. Burhans House	August 30, 2007 (#07000868)	2627 E. Genesee St. 43°02′48″N 76°06′40″W	Meadowbrook	1837 Greek Revival house; renovated in 1916 under direction of Ward Wellington Ward
14	Central New York Telephone and Telegraph Building	Central New York Telephone and Telegraph Building	April 3, 1973 (#73001234)	311 Montgomery St. 43°02′54″N 76°08′57″W	Downtown	Building designed specifically to house the telephone company, which it did from 1899 to 1905
15	Central Technical High School	Central Technical High School	April 9, 1981 (#81000662)	258 E. Adams St. 43°02′32″N 76°09′02″W	Downtown	Represents early twentieth century educational building design
16	Chapman House^{W}	Chapman House	February 14, 1997 (#97000072)	518 Danforth St. 43°04′03″N 76°09′25″W	Washington Square	Built in 1912; Colonial Revival and Arts and Crafts elements; one of the set of Ward-designed houses covered in one Multiple Property Submission
17	Clark House^{W}	Clark House	February 14, 1997 (#97000090)	105 Strathmore Dr. 43°01′20″N 76°10′13″W	Strathmore	Significant for its architecture; one of the set of Ward-designed houses covered in one Multiple Property Submission
18	Collins House^{W}	Collins House	February 14, 1997 (#97000076)	2201 E. Genesee St. 43°02′45″N 76°07′01″W	Near Eastside / Westcott	One of the set of Ward-designed houses covered in one Multiple Property Submission
19	Coughlin Brothers-Babson Brothers Factory		May 22, 2026 (#100013034)	838-842 Belden Ave; 43°03′18″N 76°09′57″W	Syracuse	
20	The Courier Building	The Courier Building	February 14, 2014 (#14000006)	210 Montgomery St., 237-43 E. Genesee St. 43°02′58″N 76°09′05″W	Syracuse	Site of Daniel Webster's 1851 "Syracuse Speech" in which he equated resistance to the Fugitive Slave Law with treason. In response, crowds in the area freed an escaped slave from the custody of federal marshals, galvanizing opposition to slavery in Central New York.
21	Crouse College, Syracuse University	Crouse College, Syracuse University	July 30, 1974 (#74001285)	Syracuse University campus 43°02′19″N 76°08′14″W	University Hill	Built in the 1880s; funded by Syracuse banker John R. Crouse; designed by Archimedes Russell Part of the Syracuse University-Comstock Tract Buildings
22	R.E. Dietz Company Factory		October 22, 2018 (#100003097)	225 Wilkinson St. 43°03′03″N 76°09′51″W		
23	Dunfee House^{W}	Dunfee House	February 14, 1997 (#97000092)	206 Summit Ave. 43°01′50″N 76°10′01″W	Strathmore	Significant for its architecture; one of the set of Ward-designed houses covered in one Multiple Property Submission
24	Morgan Dunne House		August 18, 2017 (#100001488)	464 Allen St. 43°02′36″N 76°06′42″W	University Hill	
25	O.M. Edwards Building	O.M. Edwards Building	January 26, 2001 (#00001689)	501 Plum St. 43°03′24″N 76°10′16″W	Lakefront	Representative example of an early twentieth century manufacturing plant; designed by Gordon Wright; built in 1906
26	Elmwood Park^{L}	Elmwood Park	May 19, 2005 (#05000439)	Glenwood Ave., South Ave., City Boundary; 43°01′03″N 76°10′05″W	Elmwood	Originally a privately owned park in the 1890s; significant as an example of such parks from the Pleasure Ground Era; purchased by the city of Syracuse in 1927; bridges, embankments, walls and stairs built of wood and stone were added, making the park also representative of the Reform Park Era
27	Estabrook House^{W}	Estabrook House	February 14, 1997 (#97000071)	819 Comstock Ave. 43°02′05″N 76°07′47″W	University Hill	One of the set of Ward-designed houses covered in one Multiple Property Submission; design includes a gambrel roof and a jettied second story
28	Fairchild House^{W}	Fairchild House	February 14, 1997 (#97000070)	111 Clairmont Ave. 43°01′57″N 76°10′11″W	Strathmore	Significant for its architecture; one of the set of Ward-designed houses covered in one Multiple Property Submission
29	First English Lutheran Church	First English Lutheran Church	March 4, 1998 (#98000139)	501 James St. 43°03′14″N 76°08′46″W	Near Northeast	Designed by Archimedes Russell; built in 1911; significant for mission-inspired architecture
30	Ignatius Fiesinger House		May 21, 2026 (#100013035)	1010 East Washington Street; 43°02′58″N 76°08′09″W		
31	Foster-Hubbard House	Foster-Hubbard House	December 21, 2020 (#100005915)	678 West Onondaga St. 43°02′15″N 76°09′42″W		
32	Fuller House^{W}	Fuller House	February 14, 1997 (#97000088)	215 Salt Springs Rd. 43°02′43″N 76°06′40″W	Salt Springs / Meadowbrook	Craftsman-style house from 1911; one of the set of Ward-designed houses covered in one Multiple Property Submission
33	Gang House^{W}	Gang House	February 21, 1997 (#97000073)	707 Danforth St. 43°04′10″N 76°09′21″W	Washington Square	Built in 1914; gabled; complex facade; brick-clad on the first floor exterior; stuccoed above; one of the set of Ward-designed houses covered in one Multiple Property Submission
34	Garrett House	Garrett House	February 14, 1997 (#97000080)	110 Highland St. 43°03′29″N 76°08′22″W	Near Northeast	One of the set of Ward-designed houses covered in one Multiple Property Submission; roof was originally made to look like an English Cottage thatched roof; Mercer fireplace depicting St. George and the Dragon
35	General Ice Cream Corporation Factory	General Ice Cream Corporation Factory	August 27, 2020 (#100005472)	112-120 Wilkinson St. and 212 Barker Ave. 43°03′03″N 76°09′43″W		
36	Gere Bank Building	Gere Bank Building	March 16, 1972 (#72000894)	121 E. Water St. 43°03′02″N 76°09′07″W	Downtown	Built in 1894; distinctive facade; use of contrasting materials; fireproof vaults in a room beneath the sidewalk; part of the Hanover Square Historic District In the warm weather months, entertainment is common on the plaza around the fountain. Workers in the surrounding office buildings and retail establishments often lunch there. Designed by architect Charles Erastus Colton.
37	William J. Gillett House	William J. Gillett House	May 6, 1982 (#82003393)	515 W. Onondaga St. 43°02′22″N 76°09′31″W	Near Westside / Southwest	Second Empire home; designed by William J. Gillett; also known as Trinity Exchange Shop Building
38	Grace Episcopal Church	Grace Episcopal Church	March 20, 1973 (#73001235)	819 Madison St. 43°02′44″N 76°08′07″W	University Hill	Gothic Revival church designed by Horatio Nelson White; constructed in 1876; congregation has a long history of social activism; national shrine for Saint Oakerhater
39	John Gridley House	John Gridley House	August 16, 1977 (#77000969)	205 E. Seneca Tnpk. 43°00′02″N 76°08′24″W	South Valley / North Valley	Two story; limestone; Federal style; built around 1812; one of the only houses remaining of the original Onondaga Hollow settlement
40	Hall of Languages, Syracuse University	Hall of Languages, Syracuse University	September 20, 1973 (#73001236)	Syracuse University campus 43°02′18″N 76°08′05″W	University Hill	First building constructed on the Syracuse University campus; built in 1871-73; designed by Horatio Nelson White;Part of the Syracuse University-Comstock Tract Buildings
41	George C. Hanford House	George C. Hanford House	March 6, 2023 (#100008656)	506 West Onondaga St. 43°02′23″N 76°09′31″W		
42	Hanover Square Historic District	Hanover Square Historic District	June 22, 1976 (#76001258)	101-203 E. Water, 120-200 E. Genesee, 113 Salina, 109-114 S. Warren Sts. 43°03′01″N 76°09′03″W	Downtown	Seventeen historic buildings; first commercial district in Syracuse; includes Onondaga County Savings Bank Building and Gere Bank Building, also separately listed
43	Hawley-Green Historic District	Hawley-Green Historic District	May 2, 1979 (#79001613)	Wayne, Lodi, Hawley, & N McBride Sts. 43°03′15″N 76°08′28″W	Near Northeast	At first home to craftsmen, artists and musicians; Greek Revival, Gothic Revival, and Italianate-style structures; later home to doctors, lawyers, dentists, politicians, and preachers; Second Empire, Queen Anne, and Stick Style homes Boundary increased in 2018.
44	Hoeffer House^{W}	Hoeffer House	February 14, 1997 (#97000079)	2669 E. Genesee St. 43°02′40″N 76°06′36″W	Meadowbrook	Built in 1923; one of the set of Ward-designed houses covered in one Multiple Property Submission
45	Hotel Syracuse	Hotel Syracuse	March 5, 2008 (#08000141)	500 S. Warren St. 43°02′48″N 76°09′05″W	Downtown	Opened in 1924; example of a modern hotel of its time; designed by William Stone Post
46	Huntley Apartments	Huntley Apartments	June 1, 2011 (#11000327)	407-409 Stolp Ave. 43°01′49″N 76°10′15″W	Strathmore	
47	Hunziker House^{W}	Hunziker House	February 14, 1997 (#97000087)	265 Robineau Rd. 43°01′23″N 76°10′16″W	Strathmore	Built in 1926; one of the set of Ward-designed houses covered in one Multiple Property Submission
48	Kelly House^{W}	Kelly House	February 14, 1997 (#97000077)	2205 E. Genesee St. 43°02′45″N 76°06′59″W	Near Eastside / Westcott	Built in 1923; one of the set of Ward-designed houses covered in one Multiple Property Submission
49	Kemp & Burpee-Brown-Lipe Company Buildings		May 23, 2024 (#100010352)	1117 W. Fayette St and 200-206 S. Geddes St; 43°02′45″N 76°10′16″W		
50	Polaski King House	Polaski King House	April 20, 1979 (#79001614)	2270 Valley Dr. 42°59′32″N 76°09′12″W	South Valley	Built around 1810; Polaski King was an early settler of what was then Onondaga Hollow. The house is no longer standing.
51	Loew's State Theater	Loew's State Theater	May 2, 1977 (#77000970)	362-374 S. Salina St. 43°02′51″N 76°09′11″W	Downtown	Also known as Landmark Theatre; theater from the era of "movie palaces"; opened 1928; included in the Armory Square Historic District, listed in 1984
52	Leavenworth Apartments	Leavenworth Apartments	August 24, 2011 (#11000599)	615 James St. 43°03′16″N 76°08′39″W	Near Northeast	
53	Lipe-Rollway Corporation Building		February 2, 2018 (#100002078)	1153 W Fayette St. 43°02′47″N 76°10′24″W	Westside	1920-21 poured-in-place concrete building was part of diversification of city's industries during that era
54	Lustron House Westchester Deluxe Model 02		January 28, 2026 (#100012673)	121 Manor Dr; 43°02′36″N 76°04′57″W	Salt Springs	An all-metal (specifically, porcelain-enameled steel) house manufactured by the Lustron Corporation of Columbus, Ohio. Prefabricated, assembled here in 1949. Maize yellow exterior. Westchester Deluxe 2BR model.
55	Marshall & Son Warehouse		March 11, 2024 (#100010024)	1 Webster's Landing; 43°03′15″N 76°09′10″W		
56	C.G. Meaker Food Company Warehouse	C.G. Meaker Food Company Warehouse	April 26, 2010 (#10000226)	538 Erie Blvd. W 43°02′59″N 76°09′42″W	Westside	
57	Merrell-Soule None Such Mince Meat Factory	Merrell-Soule None Such Mince Meat Factory	March 30, 2020 (#100005152)	600 North Franklin Street; 43°03′27″N 76°09′27″W	Lakefront	Meat processing plant complex built over first half of 20th century and used until 1981
58	Harriet May Mills House	Harriet May Mills House	January 24, 2002 (#01001495)	1074 W. Genesee St. 43°03′14″N 76°10′26″W	Westside	Home of women's rights leader and her abolitionist parents; she ran for New York State's Secretary of State in 1920
59	Montgomery Street-Columbus Circle Historic District	Montgomery Street-Columbus Circle Historic District	February 19, 1980 (#80004278)	E. Jefferson, E. Onondaga, Montgomery and E. Fayette Sts. 43°02′50″N 76°08′59″W	Downtown	Historic district around the statue of Columbus in Syracuse; includes St. Paul's Cathedral and Parish House, also listed separately A boundary revision was approved December 2, 2024.
60	H.A. Moyer Factory Complex	H.A. Moyer Factory Complex	May 5, 2022 (#100007668)	1710 North Salina and 301 Wolf Sts.; also 1920 Park St. 43°04′14″N 76°09′57″W		1920 Park Street represents a boundary increase approved February 26, 2024.
61	National Casket Company Building	National Casket Company Building	August 12, 2024 (#100010632)	719 East Genesee Street; 43°02′51″N 76°08′26″W		
62	New Kasson Apartments	New Kasson Apartments	August 24, 2011 (#11000600)	622 James St. 43°03′15″N 76°08′36″W	Near Northeast	
63	New York Central Railroad Passenger and Freight Station	New York Central Railroad Passenger and Freight Station	September 11, 2009 (#09000701)	815 Erie Blvd. E. and 400 Burnet Ave. 43°03′04″N 76°08′21″W	Downtown	Art Deco former railroad station a few blocks east of Clinton Square.
64	New York State Barge Canal	New York State Barge Canal	October 15, 2014 (#14000860)	Linear across city 43°03′35″N 76°09′54″W		Successor to Erie Canal approved by state voters in the early 20th century to compete with railroads.
65	Niagara Hudson Building	Niagara Hudson Building	June 14, 2010 (#10000361)	300 Erie Blvd. W. 43°03′04″N 76°09′22″W	Downtown	Art deco classic known as Niagara Mohawk Building, a few blocks west of Clinton Square
66	North Salina Street Historic District	North Salina Street Historic District	September 19, 1985 (#85002441)	Portions of Ash, Butternut, Catawba, E. Laurel, E. Willow, Pearl, & N. Salina Sts.; E. Belden & Gephardt Aves. 43°03′40″N 76°09′15″W	Washington Square	Home to German immigrants in nineteenth century, Italian immigrants in early twentieth century Boundary increased in 2019.
67	Oak Knitting Company	Oak Knitting Company	December 13, 2016 (#16000843)	102 West Division Street; 43°03′35″N 76°09′21″W	Syracuse	1899 textile mill is intact example of late work by local architect Archimedes Russell, adapting older mill styles to newer fireproof building technologies
68	J. F. O'Connor Sales Company Garage		February 26, 2024 (#100009969)	1641 East Genesee Street; 43°02′50″N 76°07′26″W		
69	Odd Fellows Lodge and Temple	Odd Fellows Lodge and Temple	April 7, 2014 (#14000128)	212 Ash St., 823 N. Townsend St. 43°03′38″N 76°09′53″W		Romanesque Revival-style building built in 1887
70	Onondaga County Savings Bank Building	Onondaga County Savings Bank Building	February 24, 1971 (#71000550)	101 S. Salina St. 43°03′02″N 76°09′07″W	Downtown	Designed by Horatio Nelson White; currently known as the Gridley Building
71	Onondaga County War Memorial	Onondaga County War Memorial	December 19, 1988 (#88002754)	200 Madison St. 43°02′48″N 76°09′05″W	Downtown	Arena built in 1949; Moderne style; significant as an example of a World War I and World War II commemorative. Hockey scenes in Slap Shot filmed there.
72	Onondaga Highlands-Swaneola Heights Historic District	Onondaga Highlands-Swaneola Heights Historic District	August 30, 2010 (#10000590)	Bellevue, Onondaga, Summit, Stolp, Ruskin, Clairmonte Aves. and Beverly Rd. 43°01′49″N 76°10′01″W	Strathmore	Cohesively designed early 20th-century residential neighborhood
73	Onondaga Park^{L}	Onondaga Park	December 31, 2002 (#02001657)	Roughly bounded by Roberts Ave., Crosett St., Onondaga Ave. and W. Colvin St.;Onondaga and South Ave., and Onondaga St. 43°01′35″N 76°09′56″W	Strathmore	Designed by George Kessler; contains Hiawatha Lake
74	People's African Methodist Episcopal Zion Church	People's African Methodist Episcopal Zion Church	January 17, 2012 (#11001024)	711 E. Fayette St. 43°02′56″N 76°08′28″W	Downtown	
75	Pi Chapter House of Psi Upsilon Fraternity	Pi Chapter House of Psi Upsilon Fraternity	May 16, 1985 (#85001124)	101 College Pl. 43°02′22″N 76°07′54″W	University Hill	Oldest fraternity house at Syracuse University; associated with emergence of fraternal organizations on campus around 1900
76	Plymouth Congregational Church	Plymouth Congregational Church	November 7, 1997 (#97001384)	232 E. Onondaga St. 43°02′45″N 76°09′01″W	Downtown	Romanesque Revival style church designed in 1858 by Horatio Nelson White and associated with abolitionism
77	Poehlman House^{W}	Poehlman House	February 14, 1997 (#97000078)	2654 E. Genesee St. 43°02′38″N 76°06′39″W	Meadowbrook	House with Arts and Crafts details, designed by Ward Wellington Ward
78	Porter House^{W}	Porter House	February 14, 1997 (#97000091)	106 Strathmore Dr. 43°02′05″N 76°07′47″W	Strathmore	One of the set of Ward-designed houses covered in one Multiple Property Submission
79	Wiliam H. Sabine House	Wiliam H. Sabine House	May 28, 2010 (#10000303)	9 Academy Green; 42°59′57″N 76°09′00″W	South Valley	Federal style home of a family that were slave-holders but became abolititionist, and possible site of abolitionist activity
80	Sagamore Apartment House	Sagamore Apartment House	September 18, 2017 (#100001625)	664-666 W. Onondaga St. 43°02′15″N 76°09′41″W		
81	St. Anthony Convent and Convent School		January 31, 2019 (#100003398)	1024 Court St. 43°04′30″N 76°09′07″W	Washington Square	
82	St. Anthony of Padua Church Complex		March 7, 2019 (#100003435)	417-425 W. Colvin St. & 1515 Midland Ave. 43°01′27″N 76°09′02″W		
83	St. Patrick's Church Complex	St. Patrick's Church Complex	August 7, 2012 (#12000480)	216 N. Lowell Ave. 43°03′00″N 76°10′58″W	Far Westside	
84	St. Paul's Armenian Apostolic Church	St. Paul's Armenian Apostolic Church	June 9, 2010 (#10000335)	310 N. Geddes St. 43°03′05″N 76°10′14″W	Westside	
85	St. Paul's Cathedral and Parish House	St. Paul's Cathedral and Parish House	December 1, 1978 (#78001891)	310 Montgomery St. 43°02′54″N 76°09′01″W	Downtown	Gothic cathedral built in 1884; designed by Henry Dudley
86	St. Paul's Methodist Episcopal Church and Parsonage		March 17, 2023 (#100008718)	300-306 West Seneca Tpk. 43°00′06″N 76°09′03″W		
87	Sanderson House at 112 Scottholm Terrace^{W}	Sanderson House at 112 Scottholm Terrace	February 14, 1997 (#97000085)	112 Scottholm Ter. 43°02′32″N 76°06′46″W	Meadowbrook	One of five nearly identical houses designed by Ward Wellington Ward, this was the home of Amon F. Sanderson, an officer of firm which developed the Scottholm Tract neighborhood in which this lies
88	Sanderson House at 301 Scottholm Boulevard^{W}	Sanderson House at 301 Scottholm Boulevard	February 14, 1997 (#97000084)	301 Scottholm Blvd. 43°02′32″N 76°06′33″W	Meadowbrook	Another Ward Wellington Ward-designed house in the Scottholm Tract area, also owned by Amon F. Sanderson
89	Sanford House^{W}	Sanford House	February 14, 1997 (#97000075)	211 Summit Ave. 43°01′50″N 76°09′59″W	Strathmore	Built in 1913; one of the set of Ward-designed houses covered in one Multiple Property Submission
90	Scottholm Tract Historic District	Scottholm Tract Historic District	July 11, 2012 (#12000407)	The Scottholm neighborhood is bounded by Salt Springs Road on the north; Brookford Road and East Avenue on the east; Meadowbrook Drive on the south; and Scottholm Terrace on the west. 43°02′29″N 76°06′33″W	Meadowbrook	
91	Sherbrook Apartments^{W}	Sherbrook Apartments	February 14, 1997 (#97000093)	600-604 Walnut Ave. 43°02′42″N 76°07′58″W	University Hill	Built in 1914; one of the set of Ward-designed houses covered in one Multiple Property Submission
92	Alton Simmons House^{W}	Alton Simmons House	January 24, 2002 (#01001493)	309 Van Rensselaer St. 43°03′09″N 76°10′01″W	Westside	Gambrel-roofed house with a Mercer fireplace; one of the set of Ward-designed houses covered in one Multiple Property Submission
93	Louis and Celia Skoler Residence	Louis and Celia Skoler Residence	February 12, 2010 (#10000013)	213 Scottholm Terrace; 43°02′27″N 76°06′42″W	Meadowbrook	Home of architect
94	C.W. Snow and Company Warehouse	C.W. Snow and Company Warehouse	April 12, 2007 (#07000290)	230 W. Willow St. 43°03′09″N 76°09′17″W	Downtown	Built in 1913; designed by Archimedes Russell in the Modern Movement style of architecture
95	South Presbyterian Church		March 27, 2017 (#100000813)	2110 S. Salina St. 43°01′33″N 76°08′45″W	Southside	Early 20th century church was home to city's largest congregation at the time; Romanesque Revival building features Tiffany stained glass windows
96	South Salina Street Downtown Historic District	South Salina Street Downtown Historic District	October 6, 2009 (#09000832)	200, 300, & E. side of 400 blocks of Warren, 205-209 Jefferson, 400 blk. & 500-550 S. Salina Sts., 43°02′50″N 76°09′05″W	Downtown	Boundary increase May 7, 2014, #14000193
97	South Salina Street Historic District	South Salina Street Historic District	March 27, 1986 (#86000671)	111 W. Kennedy St. and 1555-1829 and 1606-1830 S. Salina St. 43°01′46″N 76°08′51″W	Brighton	Historic core of what was originally the village of Danforth
98	Spencer House^{W}	Spencer House	February 14, 1997 (#97000074)	114 Dorset Rd. 43°01′59″N 76°07′36″W	University Neighborhood	Built in 1913; one of the set of Ward-designed houses covered in one Multiple Property Submission
99	Gustav Stickley House	Gustav Stickley House	August 23, 1984 (#84002820)	438 Columbus Ave. 43°02′42″N 76°07′20″W	Near Eastside	Built in 1900; regarded as the first American Craftsman house; interior renovated by Gustav Stickley in 1903
100	Stowell House^{W}	Stowell House	February 14, 1997 (#97000086)	225 Robineau Rd. 43°01′31″N 76°10′16″W	Strathmore	Stone house; one of the set of Ward-designed houses covered in one Multiple Property Submission
101	Strathmore "By the Park" Subdivision	Strathmore "By the Park" Subdivision	July 12, 2006 (#06000564)	Glenwood, S. Geddes, Wellesley, Twin Hills, Strathmore, Arden, Alanson, Charmouth, Robineau; 43°01′16″N 76°10′19″W	Strathmore	Borders Onondaga Park; planned by 1917; developed in 1919; "...no smoke, no dirt, no fogs, no two-family or apartment houses, no business places of any kind, nothing but homes."
102	Sylvester Apartment Building	Sylvester Apartment Building	August 27, 2020 (#100005483)	900-906 East Fayette St. 43°02′55″N 76°08′15″W		
103	Syracuse Boys Club	Syracuse Boys Club	May 28, 2025 (#100011899)	430 E. Genesee Street; 43°02′53″N 76°08′46″W		
104	Syracuse Bread Company Factory	Syracuse Bread Company Factory	January 24, 2023 (#100008620)	200 Maple St. 43°02′56″N 76°07′32″W		
105	Syracuse City Hall	Syracuse City Hall	August 27, 1976 (#76001259)	233 E. Washington St. 43°03′00″N 76°08′57″W	Downtown	Constructed from 1889 to 1893; Romanesque Revival style; designed by Charles Erastus Colton
106	Syracuse Lighting Company	Syracuse Lighting Company	January 11, 2017 (#100000497)	311 Genant Dr. 43°03′27″N 76°09′17″W	Syracuse	Built in stages from late 19th to mid-20th centuries, the city's first electric power plant drove its industrialization after the Erie Canal declined.
107	Syracuse Savings Bank	Syracuse Savings Bank	February 18, 1971 (#71000551)	102 N. Salina St. 43°03′03″N 76°09′08″W	Downtown	Designed by Joseph Lyman Silsbee; built in 1875 adjacent to the Erie Canal; its passenger elevator, the first in Syracuse, was an attraction
108	Syracuse University-Comstock Tract Buildings	Syracuse University-Comstock Tract Buildings	July 22, 1980 (#80004279)	Syracuse University campus 43°02′15″N 76°08′04″W	University Hill	15 buildings located on the original Syracuse University campus; land donated by George Comstock
109	Temple Society of Concord	Temple Society of Concord	April 27, 2009 (#09000259)	910 Madison St. 43°02′43″N 76°08′03″W	University Hill	Jewish congregation founded in 1839 by German immigrants; present Temple was dedicated in 1911
110	Third National Bank	Third National Bank	September 22, 1972 (#72000896)	107 James St. 43°03′05″N 76°09′07″W	Downtown	Also known as the Community Chest Building; designed by architect Archimedes Russell in 1885
111	Thornden Park^{L}	Thornden Park	December 29, 1994 (#94001490)	Roughly bounded by Ostrom Ave., Madison St., Beech St., Bristol Pl., Greenwood Pl. and Clarendon St. 43°02′29″N 76°07′35″W	Westcott	This park was acquired in 1921 as part of the City Beautiful movement and is known for its 1924 rose garden.
112	Trinity Episcopal Church		August 27, 2013 (#13000628)	523 W. Onondaga St. 43°02′20″N 76°09′38″W	Southwest / Near Westside	Part of Historic Churches of the Episcopal Diocese of Central New York MPS
113	Upsilon Alpha Chapter House	Upsilon Alpha Chapter House	August 19, 2021 (#100006764)	300 Waverly Ave. 43°02′24″N 76°07′54″W		
114	Utica Mutual Insurance Building		May 28, 2025 (#100011891)	420 E Genesee Street; 43°02′53″N 76°08′47″W		
115	Walnut Park Historic District	Walnut Park Historic District	September 15, 1983 (#83001755)	Walnut Pl. and Walnut Ave. 43°02′32″N 76°07′57″W	University Hill	Adjacent to Syracuse University; neighborhood originally established by the social elite of Syracuse; currently known as Fraternity/Sorority Row
116	Ward House^{W}	Ward House	February 14, 1997 (#97000069)	100 Circle Rd. 43°01′58″N 76°07′43″W	University Neighborhood	Arts and Crafts-style home, one of two houses designed and owned, as a speculative property, by Ward Wellington Ward.
117	Weighlock Building	Weighlock Building	February 18, 1971 (#71000552)	SE corner of Erie Blvd. E. and Montgomery St. 43°03′02″N 76°09′04″W	Downtown	Dates from 1850; canal boats were weighed here when travelling through Syracuse on the Erie Canal
118	Welsh House^{W}	Welsh House	February 14, 1997 (#97000081)	827 Lancaster Ave. 43°02′06″N 76°07′23″W	University Neighborhood	A Ward Wellington Ward-designed house, from 1912
119	West Brothers Knitting Company	West Brothers Knitting Company	September 10, 2014 (#14000582)	700-710 Emerson Ave. 43°03′18″N 76°11′26″W	Westside	Well-preserved 1906 textile mill
120	Westcott-University Neighborhood Historic District		February 6, 2025 (#100011439)	Bounded by portions of Madison St, Bassett St, East Genesee St, Cumberland Ave, Westmoreland Ave, Euclid Ave, Montana St, Dakota St, Kensington Rd, Westcott St, Broad St, Lancaster Ave, Ackerman Ave, Stratford St, etc. 43°02′11″N 76°07′32″W		
121	Whedon–Schumacher House	Whedon–Schumacher House	July 8, 2019 (#100004182)	365 W. Onondaga St. 43°02′29″N 76°09′24″W		1892 Archimedes Russell house later used as funeral home
122	White House^{W}	White House	February 14, 1997 (#97000083)	176 Robineau Rd. 43°01′35″N 76°10′22″W	Strathmore	Another Ward Wellington Ward-designed house, built in 1919
123	White Memorial Building	White Memorial Building	February 6, 1973 (#73001237)	106 E. Washington St. 43°02′58″N 76°09′09″W	Downtown	Prominent, 1876-built, Gothic building with "exceedingly pleasant" dissimilatudes
124	Louis Will House	Louis Will House	November 10, 2009 (#09000909)	714 N. McBride St. 43°03′28″N 76°08′48″W	Near Northeast	Queen Anne home of Louis Will, Progressive Party mayor of Syracuse during 1914-16.
125	Hamilton White House	Hamilton White House	July 20, 1973 (#73001238)	307 S. Townsend St. 43°02′53″N 76°08′44″W	Downtown	Built circa 1840 by and for Hamilton White, Esquire; significant in the area of architecture and for its relationship to the commerce and politics of Syracuse
126	Ziegler House^{W}	Ziegler House	February 14, 1997 (#97000082)	1035 Oak St. 43°03′59″N 76°08′13″W	Northside	Built in 1915

== Former listings ==
	Name on the Register	Image	Date listed	Date removed	Location	City or town	Description
1	Oliver Teall House		March 16, 1972 (#72000895)	December 10, 1990	105 S. Beech St.	Syracuse	Demolished on September 8, 1990.

== See also ==
- National Register of Historic Places listings in New York
