= Westside, Syracuse =

Coordinates: 43.0467°N 76.1655°W

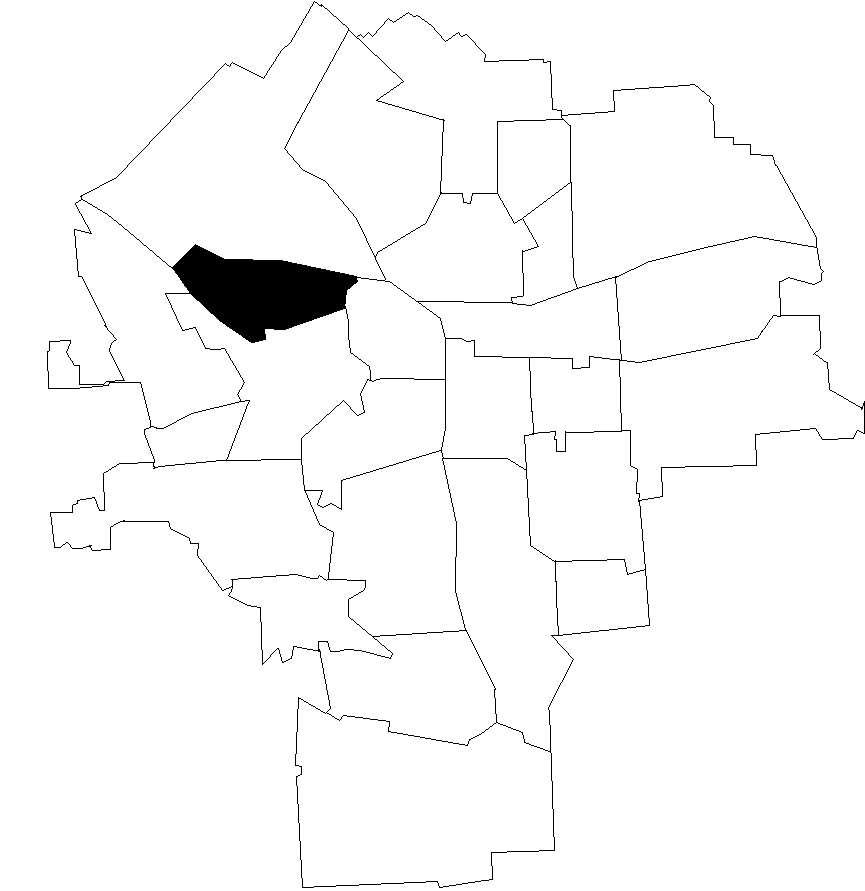
- Interactive map of Westside, Syracuse
- Annexed: 1866

Population (2000)
  - Total: 2,761
- ZIP Code: 13204

Westside is a Syracuse, New York neighborhood, directly west of Downtown Syracuse. It corresponds to Onondaga County Census Tracts 21 and 22. It is made up of three parts, near West side, far west side and the West side

Located between Interstate 690, and West Street, Syracuse’s Westside neighborhood consists of a mix of commercial, residential, and mostly-abandoned industrial units. The residential portion, centered on Park Avenue, is to the south of “Historic Automobile Row,” with its over twenty car dealerships. To the south of the neighborhood’s residences, is a former industrial section, still apparent, with its many, mostly-empty warehouses, and overgrown spur railroad tracks. Along Erie Boulevard, the southern boundary-road, much of the former industrial presence has been replaced with modern commercial office buildings. Leavenworth Park and Frazer Park are the two largest parks of the neighborhood.

Its western portion has traditionally been a Polish neighborhood. Several families of Polish descent, even direct immigrants, still live in the neighborhood. The Polish Home, a banquet and bar facility on Park Avenue, serves as a major neighborhood meeting facility.

While the neighborhood lacks pedestrian-friendly connections to its neighbors, the Lakefront, Near Westside, Far Westside, and downtown, it is served by three major bus corridors that pass along the north, south, and through the center of the neighborhood.

The Westside of Syracuse is known for its large and continuously growing Hispanic population. This neighborhood is full of businesses that are owned by, and cater to, Spanish speaking clients.

The C.G. Meaker Food Company Warehouse, Harriet May Mills House, St. Paul's Armenian Apostolic Church, Alton Simmons House, and West Brothers Knitting Company are listed on the National Register of Historic Places.
