= Washington Square, Syracuse =

Neighborhood of Syracuse, New York

Coordinates: 43.070°N 76.154°W

Neighborhood in Syracuse Washington Square
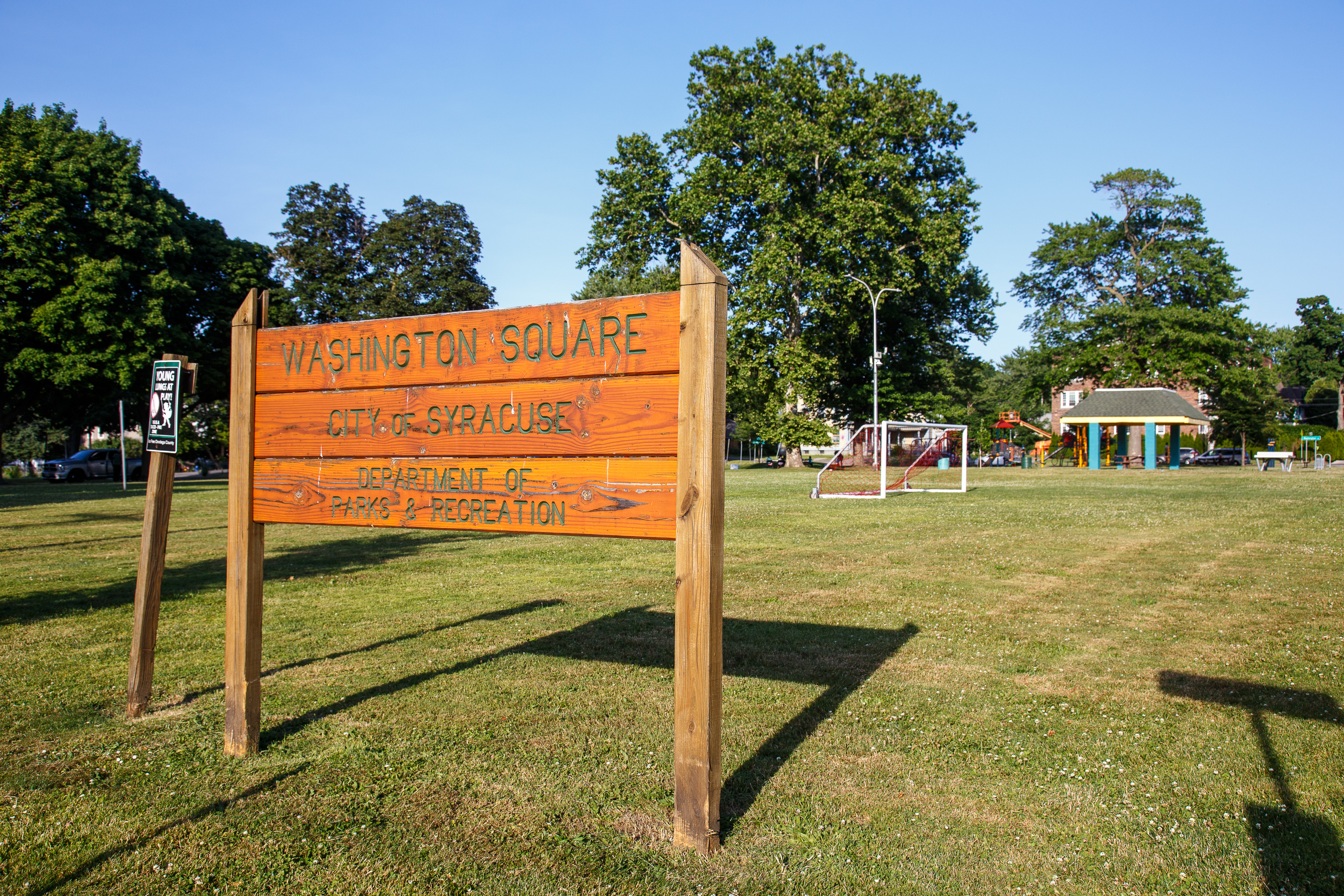
- Washington Square Park
- Interactive map of Neighborhood in Syracuse
- Country: United States
- State: New York
- County: Onondaga County
- City: Syracuse

Population (2020)
  - Total: 22,833

Washington Square is one of the 26 officially recognized neighborhoods of Syracuse, New York.

== Description ==
Washington Square encompasses what used to be the old Village of Salina which has a concentration of two, three, and four- family structures, and larger apartments surrounded by single-family homes. The neighborhood contains mixed-use buildings along the North Salina Street corridor. Washington Square has the most historic rooming/boarding houses out of all the city's neighborhoods. Historic multiple residences ranked second highest, and apartment buildings ranked seventh. Almost 50 percent of Washington Square's mixed-use buildings have historic significance.

The North Salina Street Historic District runs from the 500 Block (where Prospect Street meets N. Salina Street), to the end of the 900 block at Union Place. The City of Syracuse hired a consultant to initiate a streetscape enhancement plan, which includes improved sidewalks, new street furniture, improved parking, new landscaping, interpretive historic markers, and a pedestrian friendly atmosphere. This is intended to be a catalyst for store owners to rehabilitate or improve their own storefronts in order to attract more businesses to locate on this once magnificent 19th Century commercial strip.

The Washington Square neighborhood consists of a mix of residential, commercial and industrial sectors. Businesses are concentrated along North Salina, North State Street, East Hiawatha Boulevard, and Wolf Street. Retail, professional, service, wholesale, and industrial type businesses populate the area. Franklin Elementary is the school located in the neighborhood.

Schiller Park serves the needs for this area. Woodlawn Cemetery, though not a park, is often used for dog walking and strolling by the neighbors. Washington Square Park lies in the far western corner, along North Salina Street.

In addition to the North Salina Street Historic District, the Chapman House and Gang House are listed on the National Register of Historic Places.

== Geography ==
It borders three other Syracuse neighborhoods, with Northside to the east, Near Northeast to the southeast, and Lakefront to the west.
