= Near West Side =

Near West Side or Near Westside can refer to:

- Near West Side, Chicago
- Near Westside Historic District
- Near Westside, Syracuse

== See also ==
- Near East Side (disambiguation)
- Near North Side (disambiguation)
- Near South Side (disambiguation)
- West Side (disambiguation)
