= Near East Side =

Near East Side or Near Eastside may refer to:

- Near East Side, Chicago, Illinois
- Near East Side, Columbus, Ohio
- Near Eastside, Syracuse, New York

== See also ==
- Near North Side (disambiguation)
- Near South Side (disambiguation)
- Near West Side (disambiguation)
