= Trinity Episcopal Church (Syracuse, New York) =

Historic church in New York, United States

- U.S. National Register of Historic Places
- Location within New York Location within the United States
- Location: 523 W. Onondaga St., Syracuse, New York
- Coordinates: 43°02′20″N 76°09′38″W
- Area: 1.24 acres (0.50 ha)
- Built: 1914-1915, 1926
- Architect: Brazer & Robb; Bonta, Edwin
- Architectural style: Gothic Revival
- MPS: Historic Churches of the Episcopal Diocese of Central New York MPS
- NRHP reference No.: 13000628
- Added to NRHP: August 27, 2013

Trinity Episcopal Church, now known as the Faith by Love Church, is a historic Episcopal church located in the Southwest / Near Westside neighborhood of Syracuse, Onondaga County, New York. The church was built in 1914–1915, and is a one-story, Collegiate Gothic style stone building. It has a steeply pitched front gable slate roof and a massive square tower with corner buttresses. Also on the property is the contributing Parish House. It is a two-story, Second Empire style frame dwelling with a mansard roof. The Jaynes Memorial Hall was added to the rear of the Parish House in 1926. The congregation was established in 1855, and remained at the location until 1994.

It was listed on the National Register of Historic Places in 2013.

The Trinity Church, Leyfield Parish House and William J. Gillett House were listed as sold in December 2017, for $185,000.
