= Near Eastside, Syracuse =

Coordinates: 43.0378°N 76.1199°W

Near Eastside is one of the 26 officially recognized neighborhoods of Syracuse, New York. It borders seven other Syracuse neighborhoods, with Downtown Syracuse to the west, Near Northeast, Lincoln Park, Syracuse, and Eastwood to the north, Salt Springs to the east, and University Hill and Westcott to the south.

The Gustav Stickley House, Collins House, and Kelly House are listed on the National Register of Historic Places.
