= Near North =

Near North may refer to:

== Places ==
- Near North, Minneapolis, a defined community consisting of several neighborhoods
  - Near North (neighborhood), Minneapolis, within the broader community

== Other geographic references ==
- Norte Chico, Chile, a region in Chile sometimes translated as Near North
- Near north, a term used in Australia for the Far East
- Near north, a cultural and economic region of Canada, roughly similar to the Boreal forest ecological region

== See also ==
- Near North Side (disambiguation)
