= Near South Side =

Near South Side or Near Southside can refer to:

- Near South Side, Chicago, Illinois
- Near Southside, St. Louis, Missouri
- Near Southside, Fort Worth, Texas

== See also ==
- Near East Side (disambiguation)
- Near North Side (disambiguation)
- Near West Side (disambiguation)
