= Near North Side =

Near North Side or Near Northside may refer to:

- Near North Side, Chicago, Illinois
- Near Northside, Houston, Texas
- Near North Side, Omaha, Nebraska

== See also ==
- Near North (disambiguation)
- Near East Side (disambiguation)
- Near South Side (disambiguation)
- Near West Side (disambiguation)
