= Huntley Apartments =

- U.S. National Register of Historic Places
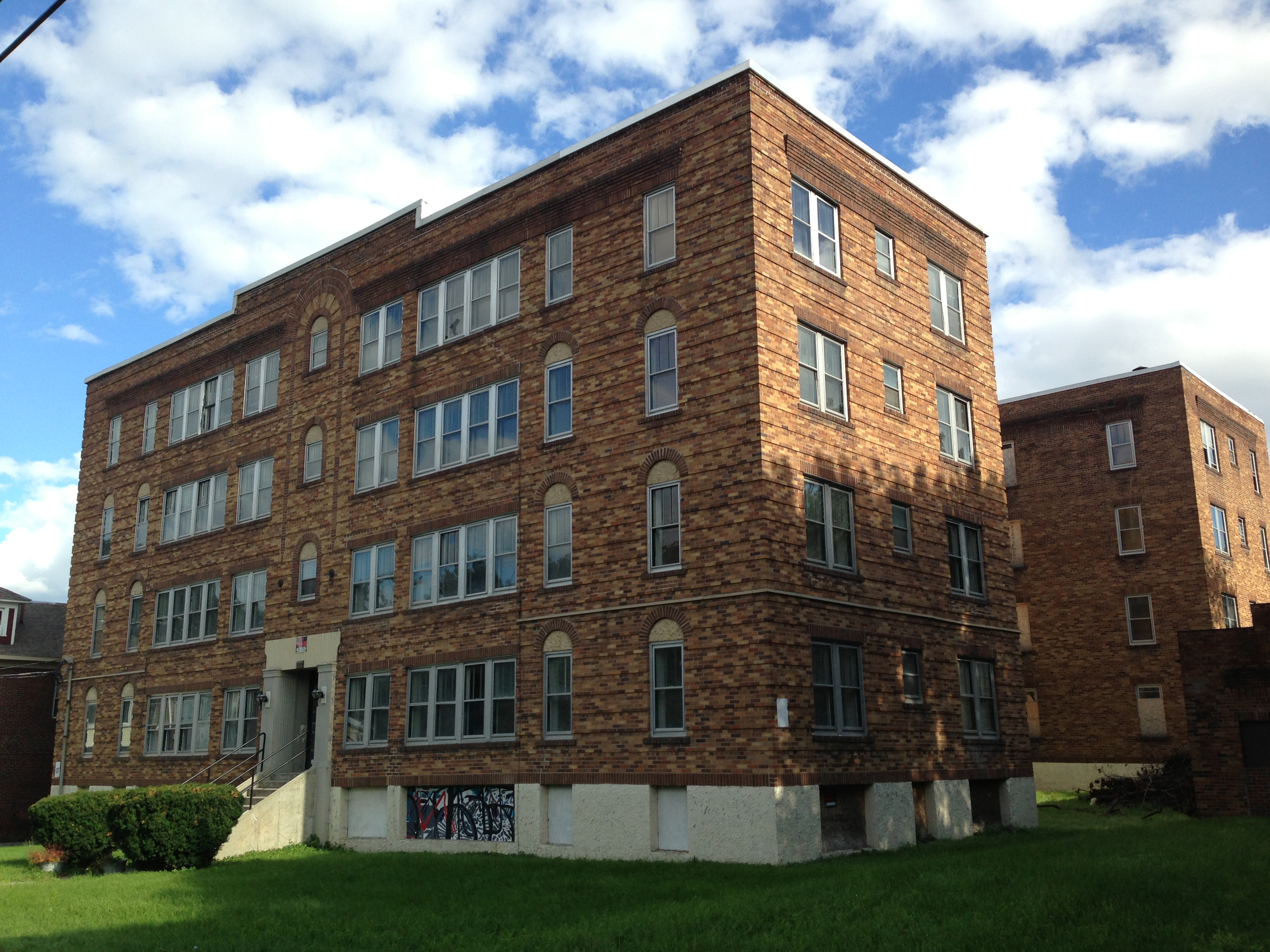
- Huntley Apartments, August 2013

- Location within New York
- Location: 407-409 Stolp Ave., Syracuse, New York
- Coordinates: 43°01′48″N 76°10′16″W
- Area: 0.4 acres (0.16 ha)
- Built: 1928
- Built by: Moses Hilder
- NRHP reference No.: 11000327
- Added to NRHP: June 1, 2011

The Huntley Apartment building is a four-story, "H" shaped, historic brick apartment building located in Syracuse, New York. It was built in 1928, and now contains 42 apartments of various sizes, from studios to three bedroom flats. Connected to the building is a one-story, masonry, flat-roofed garage.

The building was listed on the National Register of Historic Places in 2011.
