= Ashton House (Syracuse, New York) =

Historic house in New York, United States

- U.S. National Register of Historic Places
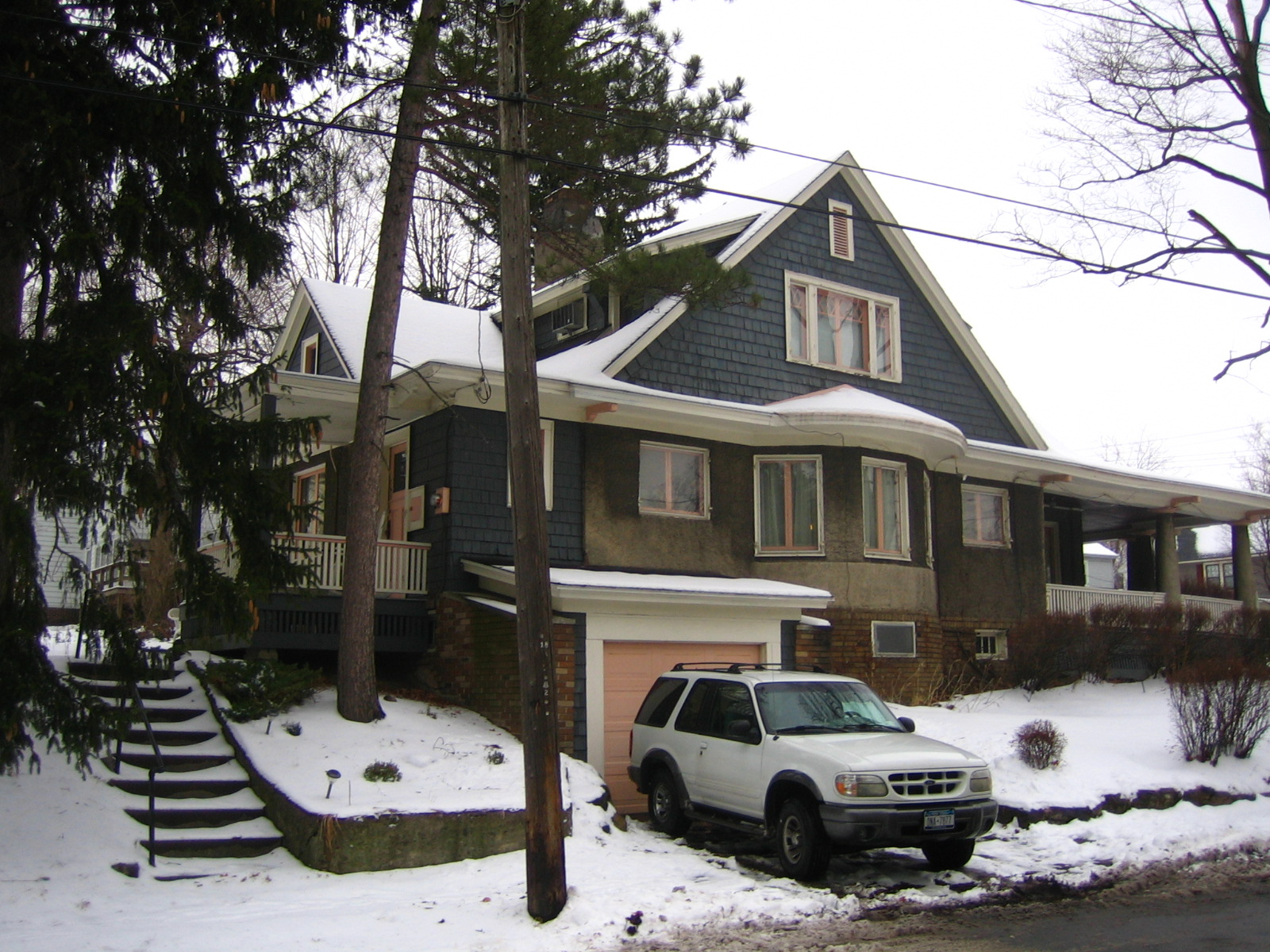

- Location within New York
- Location: 301 Salt Springs Rd., Syracuse, New York
- Coordinates: 43°2′43.12″N 76°6′37.29″W
- Area: less than one acre
- Built: 1913
- Architect: Ward Wellington Ward
- Architectural style: Arts and Crafts
- MPS: Architecture of Ward Wellington Ward in Syracuse MPS
- NRHP reference No.: 97000089
- Added to NRHP: February 14, 1997

Ashton House, also known as the Ashton residence, is a Ward Wellington Ward-designed home built in 1913 in Syracuse, New York. It was listed on the National Register of Historic Places as part of the Architecture of Ward Wellington Ward in Syracuse MPS in 1997.

Features include a wraparound porch, a Mercer tile fireplace and a Keck studio stained glass interior window.

It is located at 301 Salt Springs Road in the Salt Springs neighborhood of Syracuse.
