= Berkeley Park Subdivision Historic District =

Historic district in New York, United States

- U.S. National Register of Historic Places
- U.S. Historic district
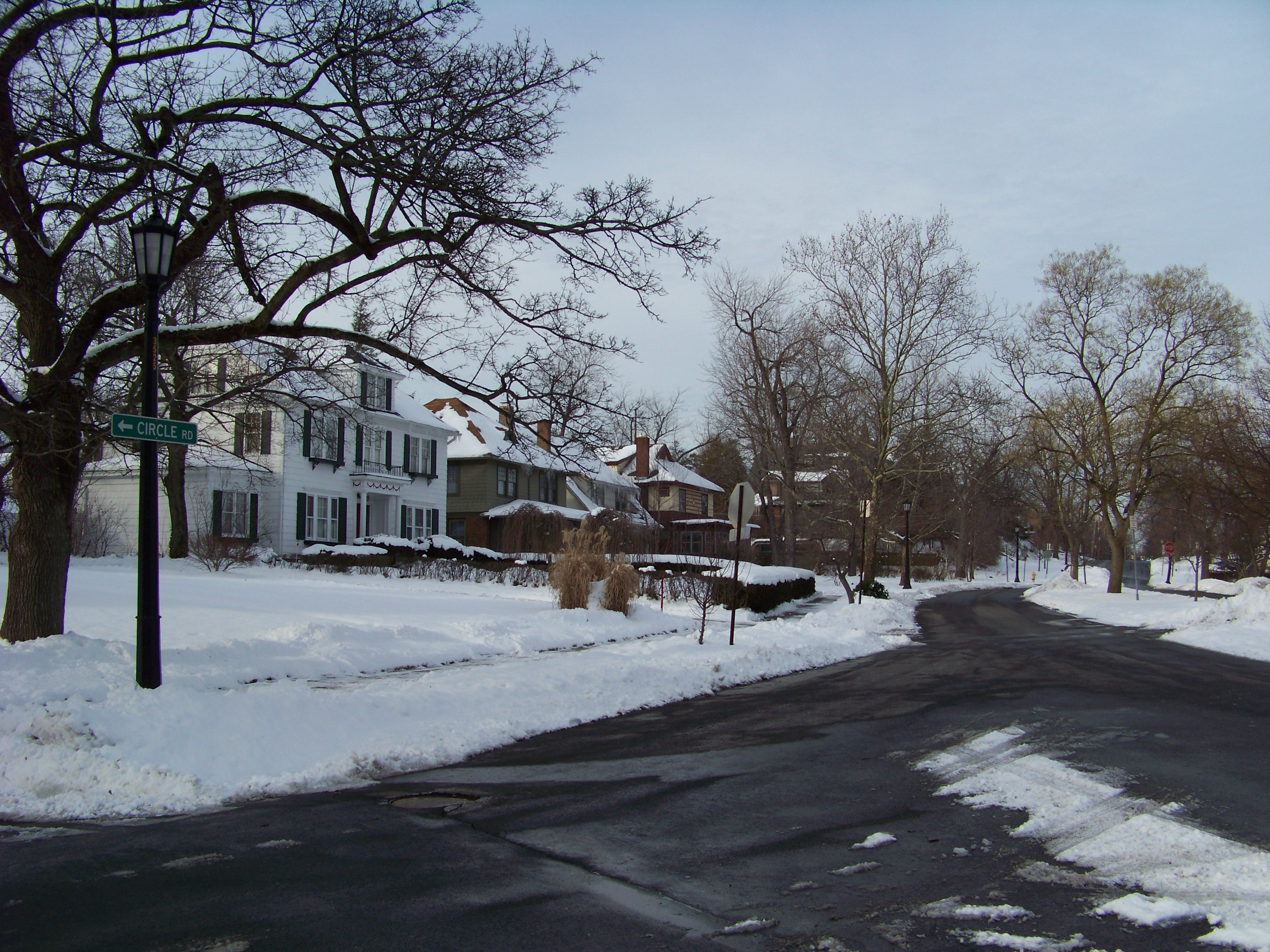

- Location within New York Location within the United States
- Location: Roughly bounded by Strattford St., Ackerman Ave., Morningside Cemetery, and Comstock Ave., Syracuse, New York
- Coordinates: 43°1′55″N 76°7′38″W
- Architect: Clarence Congdon
- Architectural style: Late 19th And 20th Century Revivals
- MPS: Historic Designed Landscapes of Syracuse MPS
- NRHP reference No.: 02000055
- Added to NRHP: February 20, 2002

Berkeley Park Subdivision Historic District is a residential subdivision in Syracuse, New York. It was designed in 1911 by Clarence Congdon. It is significant as "an outstanding and highly intact representation of early-twentieth century landscape architectural design."

The district was added to the National Register of Historic Places in 2002.
