= Courier Building =

Historic commercial building in New York, United States

- The Courier Building
- U.S. National Register of Historic Places
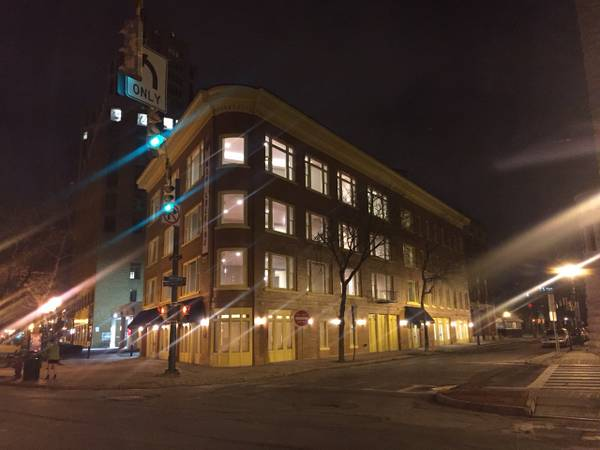

- Location within New York Location within the United States
- Location: 210 Montgomery St., 237-243 E. Genesee St., Syracuse, New York
- Coordinates: 43.0498°N 76.1495°W
- Area: Less than 1 acre (0.40 ha)
- Built: 1844
- Architect: Hunt, Summer L.
- Architectural style: Greek Revival, Chicago
- NRHP reference No.: 14000006
- Added to NRHP: February 14, 2014

Courier Building, also known as the Frazee Block, Cutlery Block, Fire Engineer Block, and Potter Building, is a historic commercial building located in Downtown Syracuse, Onondaga County, New York. It was built in 1844, and is a four-story, trapezoidal shaped, Greek Revival style painted brick building. It was updated in 1918 with Chicago Commercial style design elements when modified for use as a Moose Lodge (1918-1946). The Courier newspaper occupied the building from 1856 to 1905. It was the site of Daniel Webster's 1851 "Syracuse Speech" in which he equated resistance to the Fugitive Slave Law with treason. In response, crowds in the area freed an escaped slave from the custody of federal marshals, galvanizing opposition to slavery in Central New York.

It was listed on the National Register of Historic Places in 2014.
