= C.G. Meaker Food Company Warehouse =

Historic commercial building in New York, United States

- U.S. National Register of Historic Places
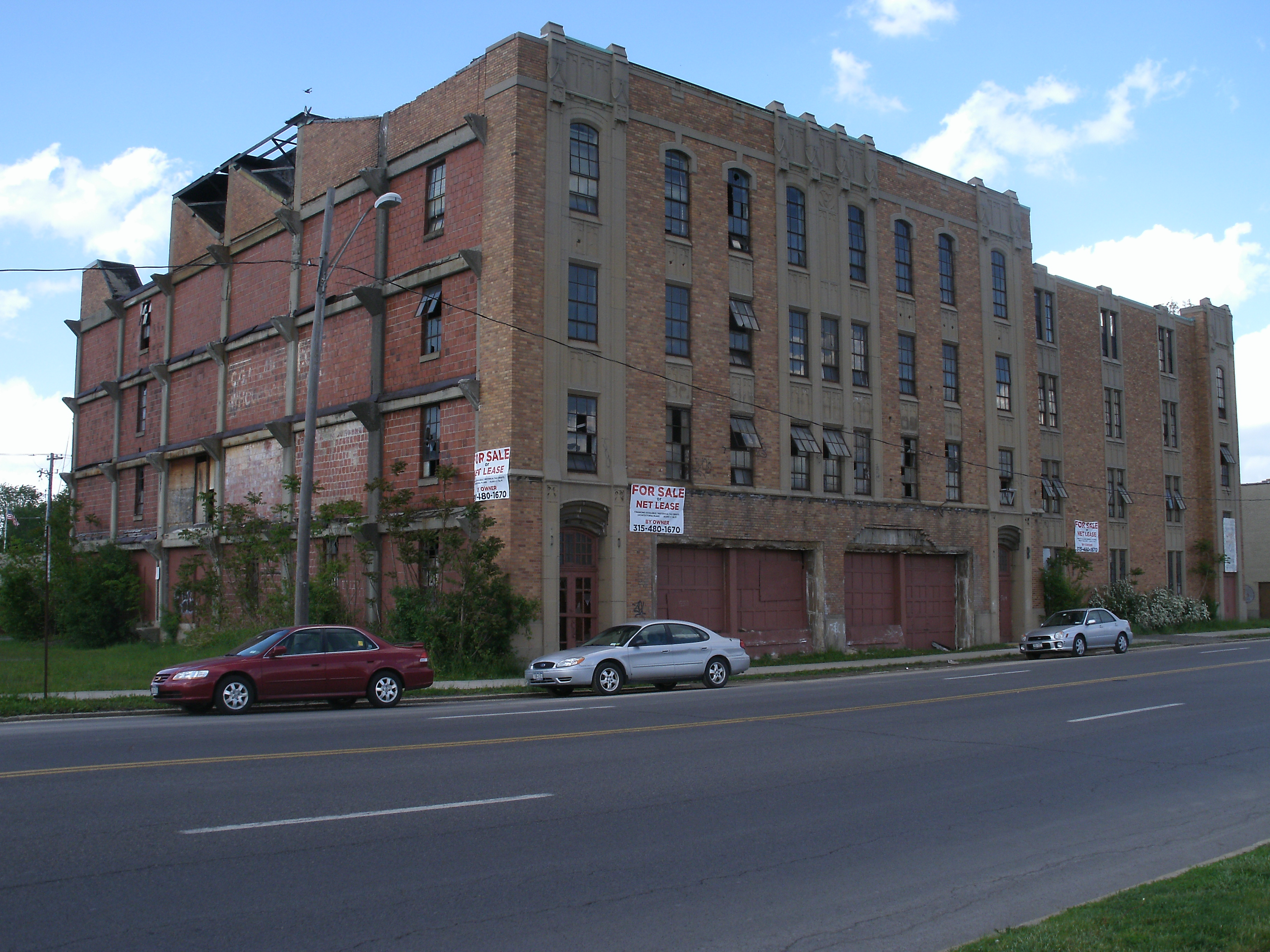
- South (fronting on Erie Blvd) and west sides

- Location within New York
- Location: 538 Erie Blvd. W., Syracuse, New York
- Coordinates: 43.0498°N 76.16260°W
- Built: 1930
- Architectural style: Late Gothic Revival, Modern Movement
- MPS: Industrial Resources in the City of Syracuse, Onondaga County, NY MPS
- NRHP reference No.: 10000226
- Added to NRHP: April 26, 2010

C.G. Meaker Food Company Warehouse, in Syracuse, New York, was listed on the National Register of Historic Places on April 26, 2010.

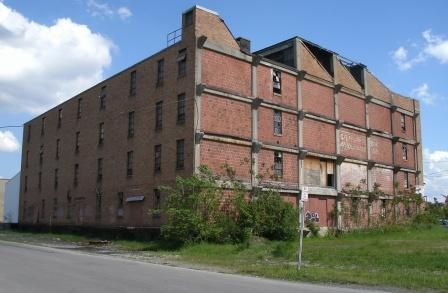
West and north sides

The building was deemed significant as an "excellent local example of an early Modern poured-in-place concrete building." It was planned during economic prosperity of the 1920s, but not completed until depression year 1930, in perhaps somewhat scaled-back form. It is located on Erie Boulevard, which into the 1920s was the route of the Erie Canal, and later was route of railroads.

In May, 2016, a certified historic rehabilitation was completed. The building is now home to 33 residential apartments and first-floor commercial space.

== See also ==
- National Register of Historic Places listings in Syracuse, New York
