= William H. Sabine House =

Historical house in New York

- U.S. National Register of Historic Places
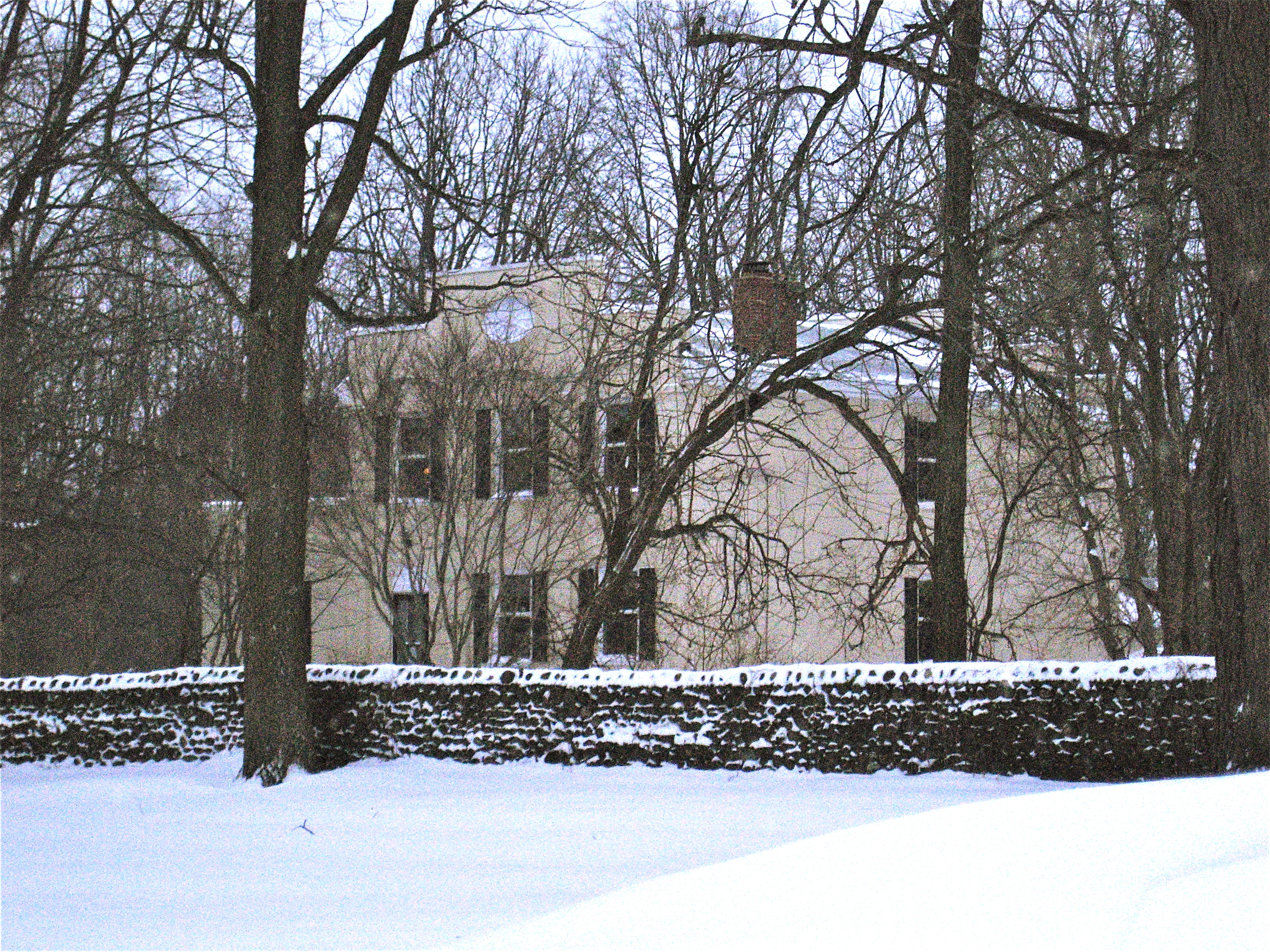

- Location within New York
- Interactive map showing the location of William H. Sabine House
- Location: 9 Academy Green, Syracuse, New York
- Coordinates: 42°59′56.56″N 76°9′0.33″W
- NRHP reference No.: 10000303
- Added to NRHP: May 28, 2010

The William H. Sabine House in Syracuse, New York was listed on the U.S. National Register of Historic Places on May 28, 2010.

The Sabine family was a slave-holding family and later it was an abolitionist family. The family owned the house until 1944. It is currently a private residence.
