= William J. Gillett House =

Historic house in New York, United States

- U.S. National Register of Historic Places
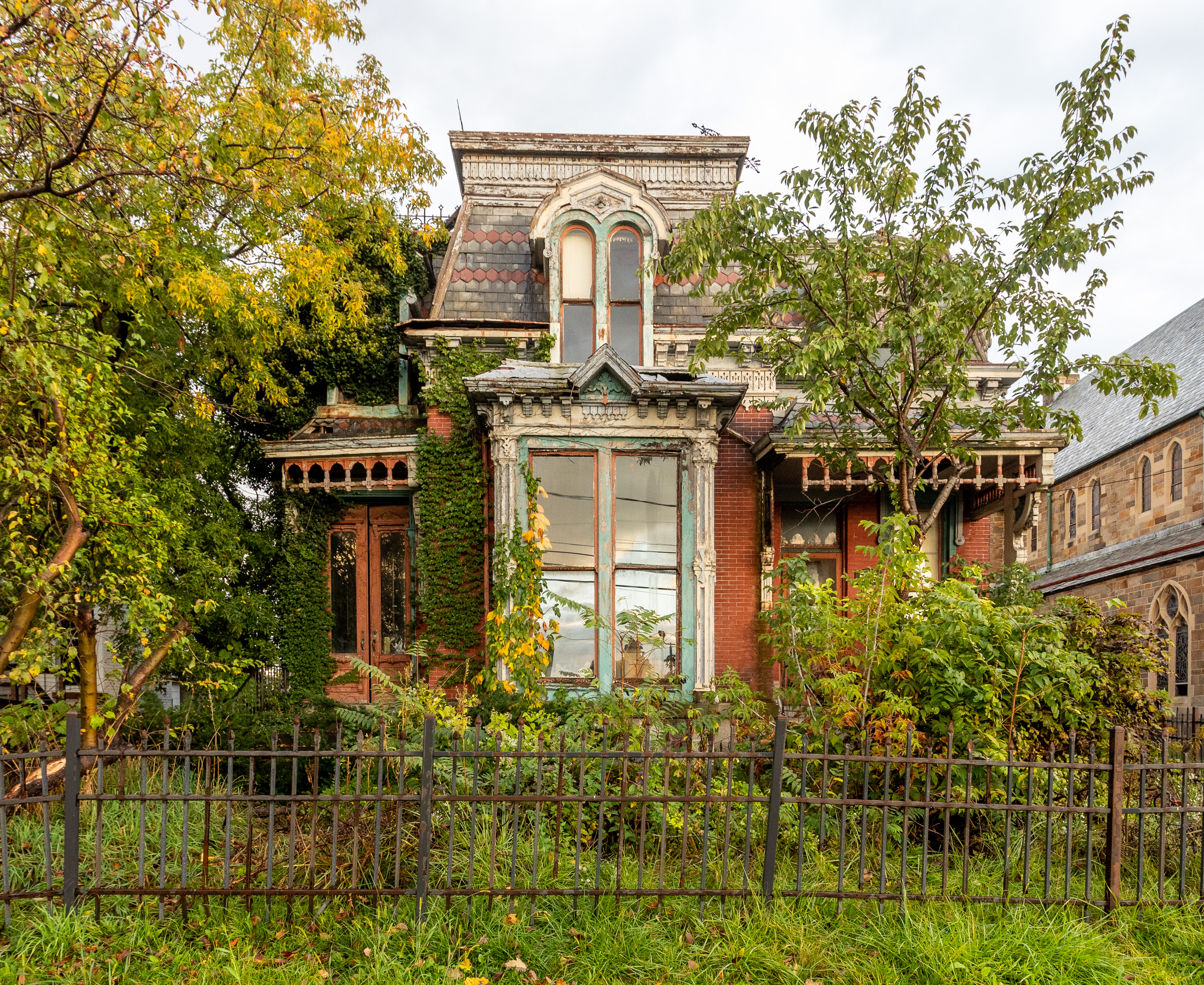

- Location within New York Location within the United States
- Location: 515 W. Onondaga St., Syracuse, New York
- Coordinates: 43°2′22″N 76°9′31″W
- Built: 1877
- Architect: Gillett, William J.
- Architectural style: Second Empire
- NRHP reference No.: 82003393
- Added to NRHP: May 06, 1982

The William J. Gillett House, also known as Trinity Exchange Shop Building or William J. Gillett Residence, is a building in Syracuse, New York. It was designed by William J. Gillett.

== History and description ==
Gillett was born in 1840 and served in the Union Army during the American Civil War. He designed and built this house ca. 1875, and died in 1903.

The house continued as a private residence until 1957, when it was purchased by the neighboring Trinity Episcopal Church. The church used the downstairs as a thrift shop, and rented apartments on the second floor.

It was listed in 1982 for its architecture. A local neighborhood group purchased the property, along with the Trinity Episcopal Church next door, in 2018. They expected to begin stabilization and renovations of the structure in 2023.

The city conducted an "emergency partial demolition" of the structure in December 2023, citing extensive deterioration.

William Gillett House

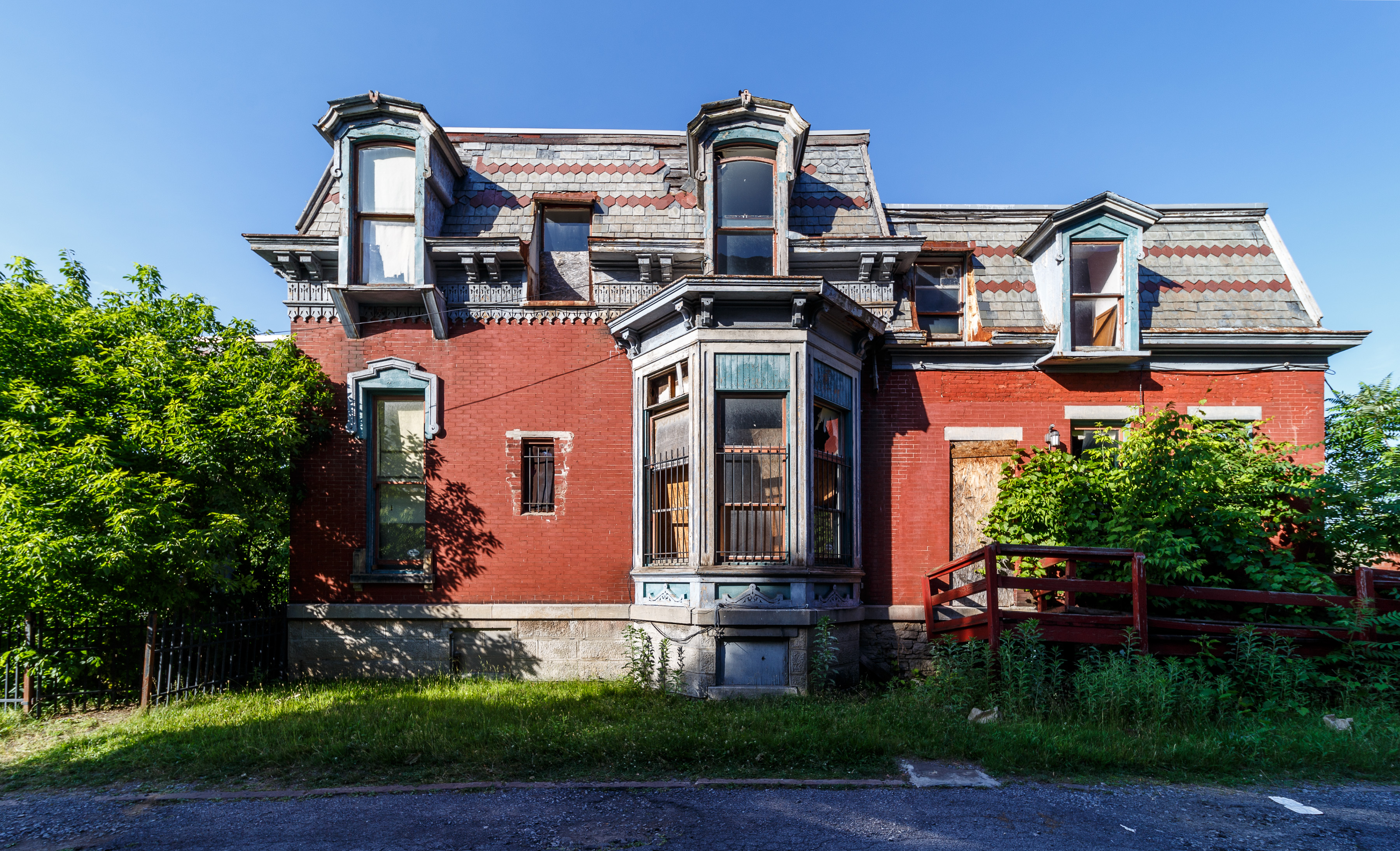
2022 (side view)

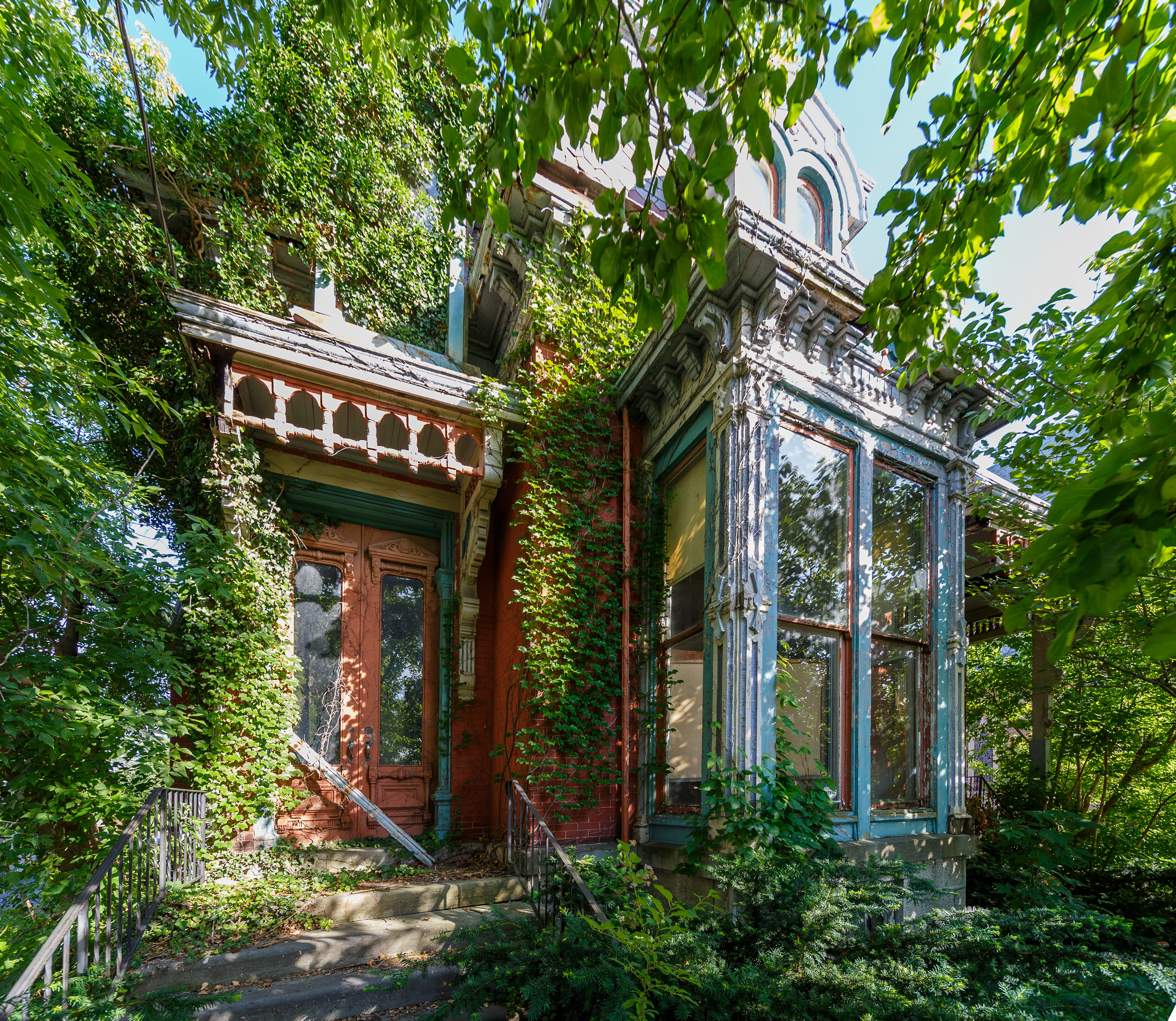
Abandoned and overgrown in 2022
