= Lakefront, Syracuse =

Coordinates: 43.061°N 76.165°W

Lakefront is one of the 26 officially recognized neighborhoods of Syracuse, New York. It borders five other Syracuse neighborhoods, with Washington Square and Near Northeast to the east, Downtown Syracuse to the southeast, and Westside and Far Westside to the south.

Lakefront includes the Franklin Square, Syracuse and Inner Harbor, Syracuse areas.

O.M. Edwards Building was listed on the National Register of Historic Places in 2001.
