= West Brothers Knitting Company =

- U.S. National Register of Historic Places
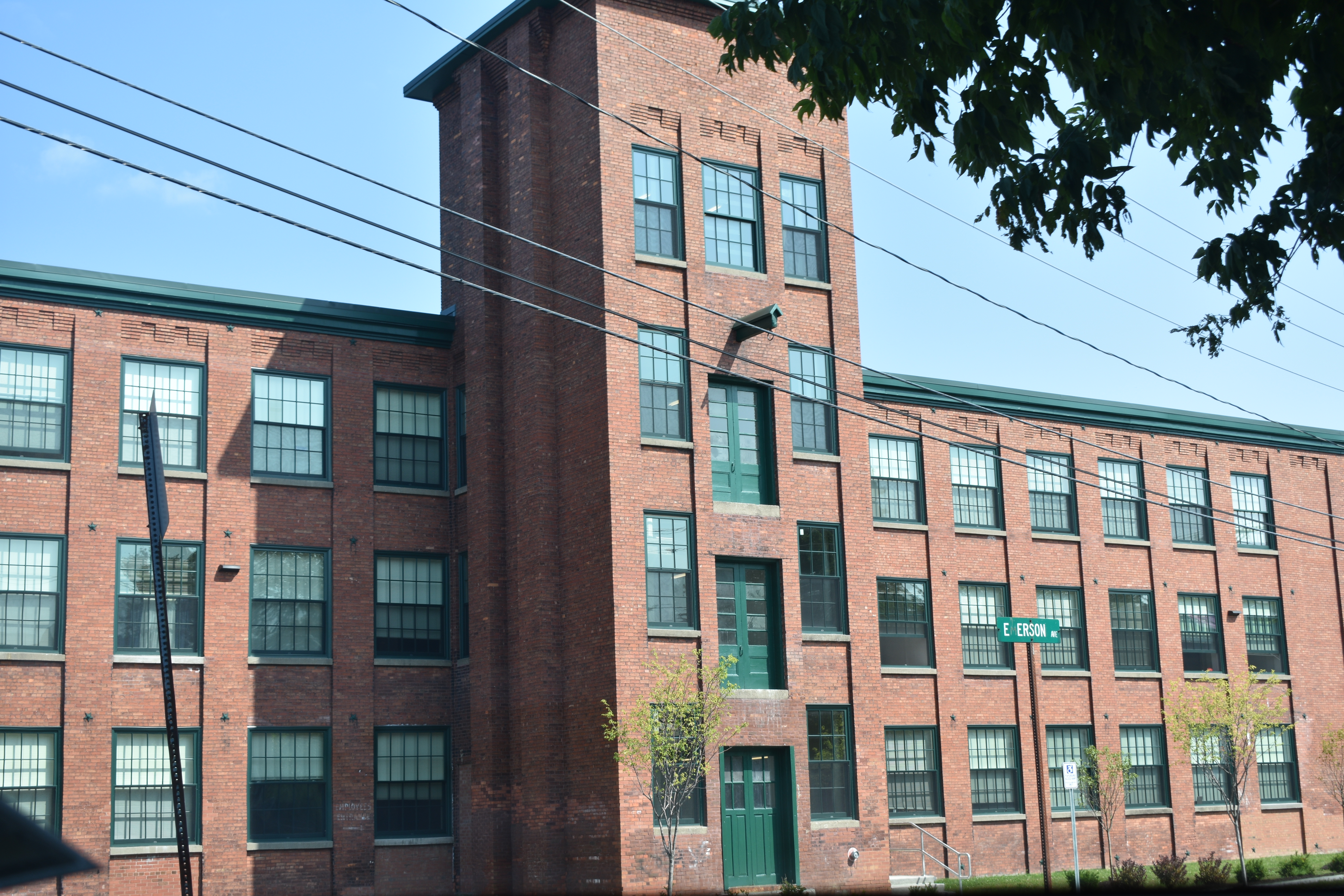

- Location within New York Location within the United States
- Location: 700-710 Emerson Ave., Syracuse, New York
- Coordinates: 43°03′18″N 76°11′26″W
- Area: Less than 1 acre (0.40 ha)
- Built: 1906-1907, 1945, 1958
- Architect: Wright, Gordon A.
- MPS: Industrial Resources of the City of Syracuse MPS
- NRHP reference No.: 14000582
- Added to NRHP: September 10, 2014

West Brothers Knitting Company is a historic knitting mill located in the Westside neighborhood of Syracuse, Onondaga County, New York. West Brothers was built in 1906–1907, and is a three-story, 20 bay by 6 bay, red brick mill building with a raised basement. It is of standard mill construction. The front facade features a three-bay, four-story elevator tower. The West Knitting Corporation moved to Wadesboro, North Carolina in 1928. The mill later housed a corrugated paper container manufacturer, the Gray Brothers Boot & Shoe Manufacturing Company, and most recently a manufacturer of a wide variety of air filters.

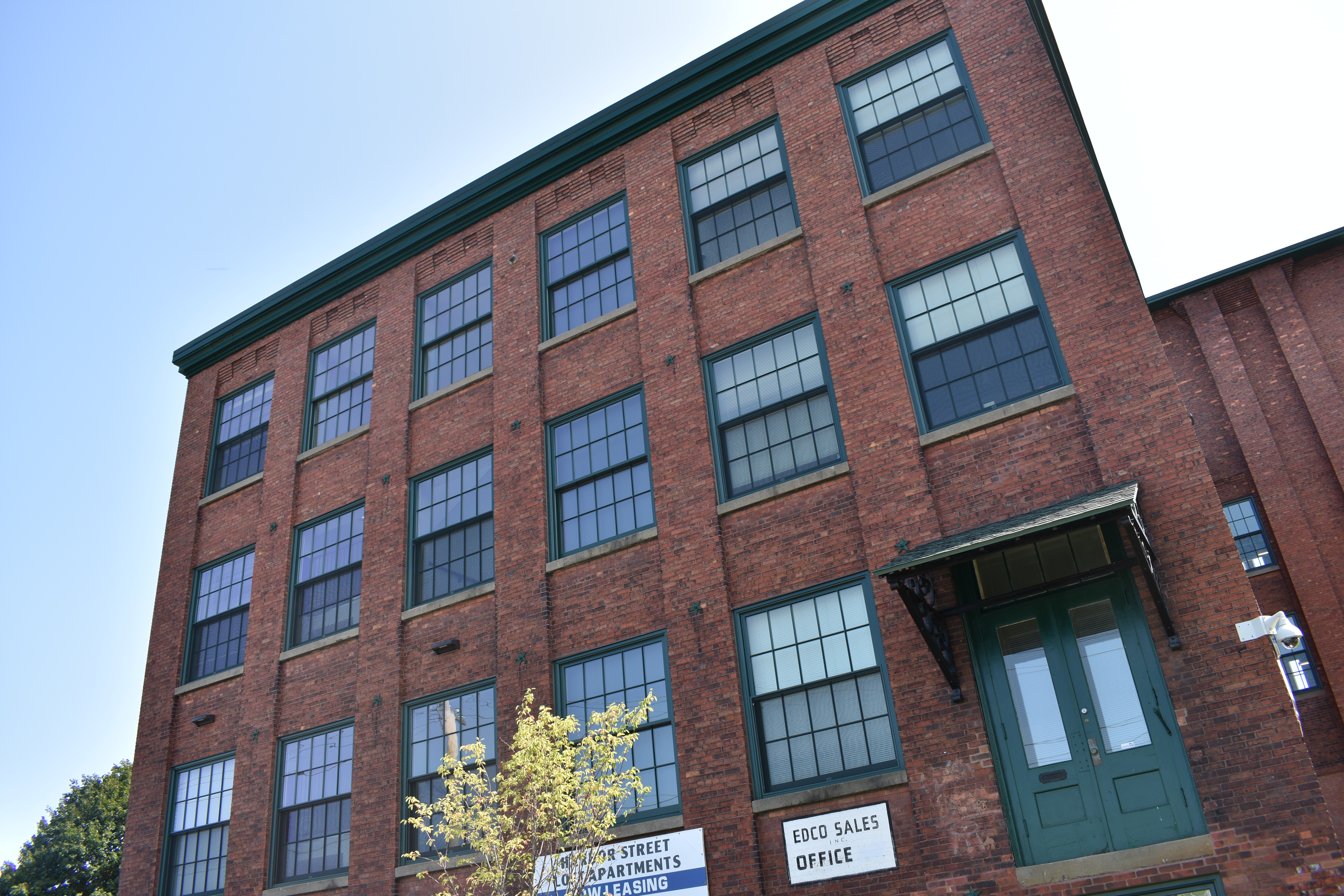
Angle of the West Brother's Knitting Company Building

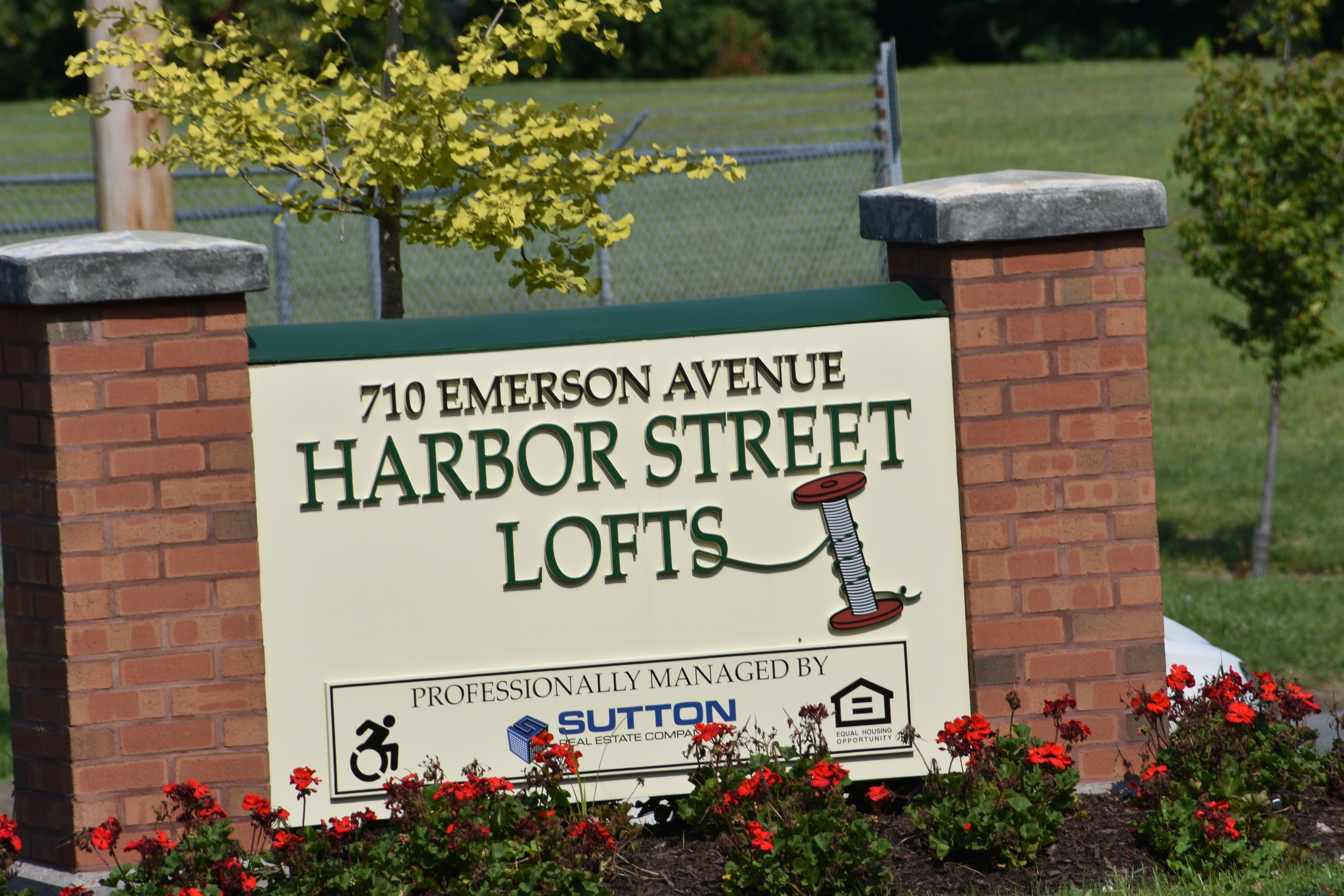
Sign of West Harbor Street Lofts

It was listed on the National Register of Historic Places in 2014.
