= Salt Springs, Syracuse =

Neighborhood in Syracuse, New York

Coordinates: 43°3′4″N 76°5′43″W

Salt Springs
Alternative name:
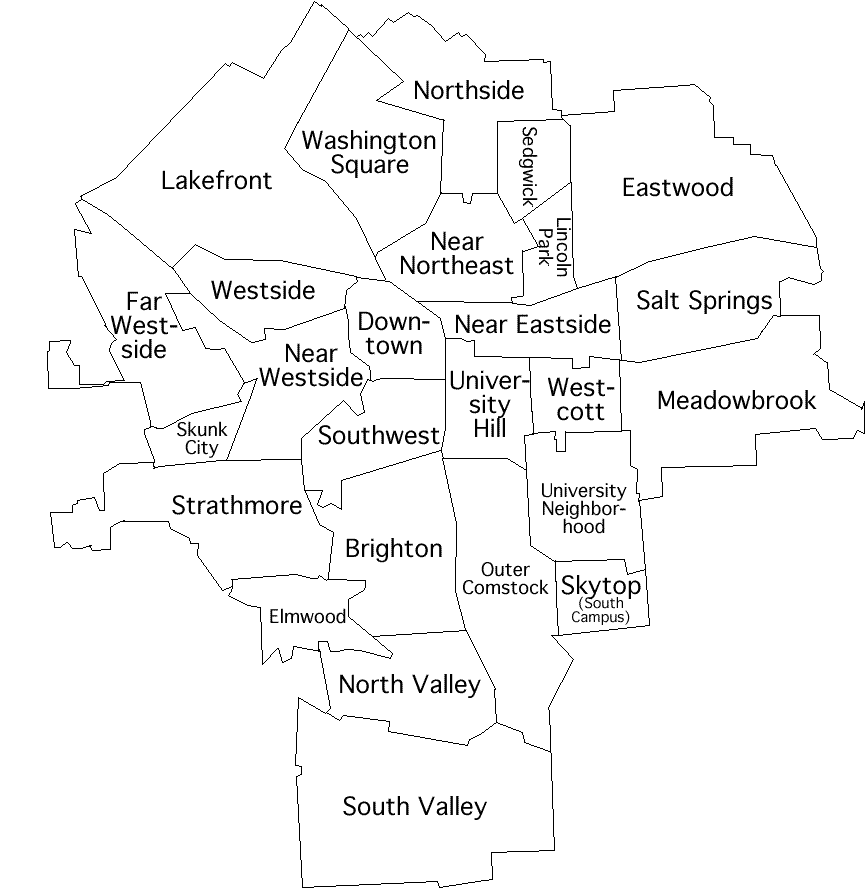

Location in Syracuse

Annexed

Population (2008)
4,937
Median age
29.4
Median household income
$42,347
Owner-occupied housing
38.5%
ZIP codes
13206, 13224

Salt Springs is a Syracuse, New York neighborhood, located in the northeastern corner of the city. It corresponds to Onondaga County Census Tract xx.

== Borders ==
Salt Springs is one of the 26 officially recognized neighborhoods of Syracuse, New York. It is located on the east side of the city. Le Moyne College is located just east of the neighborhood.

== Geography ==
It borders three other Syracuse neighborhoods, with Eastwood to the north, Near Eastside to the west, and Meadowbrook to the south.

== Residential ==
Ashton House is one historic home in the neighborhood, which is listed on the National Register of Historic Places.

== Commercial ==
It contains the Le Moyne Plaza, owned by Le Moyne College.

It also contains the Soule Branch Library.

== Miscellaneous ==
The Ashton House and Fuller House are listed on the National Register of Historic Places.

It is a predominantly African-American neighborhood, that is generally working to middle class. (check block groups for more information or here: https://statisticalatlas.com/neighborhood/New-York/Syracuse/Salt-Springs/Overview )

Bethany Baptist Church, the second oldest church in the city that worships out of the African American tradition, is also in the neighborhood.
