= Southwest, Syracuse =

Southwest is one of the 26 officially recognized neighborhoods of Syracuse, New York. The neighborhood is a part of the Southwest Gateway, an area that has traditionally been defined as being under-invested and having declining infrastructure. Today, it is largely residential with a number of vacant properties and unused buildings. Despite its history, the neighborhood has seen renewed hope with the New York government's $10M Downtown Revitalization Initiative. This project comes amid an ongoing project that will result in the demolition of the I-81 highway through the city, which touches the borders of this neighborhood.

Southwest, Syracuse is home to JMA Wireless’ 5G campus and headquarters, the Central New York Regional Transportation Authority, a Price Rite Marketplace, and the Southwest Community Center, among a few other employers in the area.

== Demographics ==
The neighborhood is majority Black (68.9%), with the remaining race demographics breakdown being 13.2% Hispanic, 12.7% White, 3.8% mixed, 1% other, and 0.4% Asian. The median age of people in this area is 30.5 years old, and 21.6% of residents speak a language in addition to English at home.

According to the United States Census Bureau, this neighborhood has a population of 6,967 people, with 3,292 households. The median household income is $26,271, and the employment rate is 47.9%. In total, 34.4% hold a bachelor's degree or higher, and 46.8% of the school enrolled population are enrolled in school between Kindergarten and 12th grade. An estimated 52.9% of people in this neighborhood are living in poverty.

== Geography ==
Southwest borders five other Syracuse neighborhoods, with Downtown Syracuse to the north, University Hill to the east, Brighton to the south, and Strathmore and Near Westside to the west. It includes properties with ZIP codes 13202, 13204, 13205, and 13207, and is home to 773 employer establishments. Local parks such as Billings Park, Roesler Park, Wilson Park, Libba Cotten Grove, and Spirit of Jubilee Park are all a part of this neighborhood. Additionally, the New York, Susquehanna and Western Railway runs through a piece of this neighborhood.

=== Proximity to I-81 ===
The neighborhood touches Interstate 81, a highway that runs through the city of Syracuse. In 2023, construction began on the project, which will affect roads that take commuters through the city. The project will change traffic patterns in the Southwest neighborhood due to a new community grid road system that will be implemented as a part of the takedown. The area has been studied due to the way it tore apart neighborhoods and caused businesses to shut down. The project "Visualizing 81," investigated the history of this neighborhood, and while many residents at that time felt it was a great place to live, newspapers referred to the construction of the highway as "slum cleanup." The highway has been blamed for many of the struggles felt by residents today, and the new I-81 takedown project brings hope for a better future.

== Community-based organizations ==
=== Southwest Community Center ===
The Southwest Community Center is the centerpiece of the neighborhood community. It is located at 401- 425 South Avenue, Onondaga, Syracuse, NY, 13204, and is open to residents Monday-Saturday every week. The community center hosts a child daycare and works on other programs to serve the greater community. They are known for hosting public meetings as well as providing programming related to financial, educational, recreational, and public health topics. These services are accessible to any Onondaga County resident. One notable investment that was made in this center was in 2014 when they received $369,400 to fight gun violence from the New York State government. There have also been some controversies related to their after-school program, which was abruptly shut down in 2023 due to staffing shortages.

=== Syracuse Grows ===
Syracuse Grows is an organization that offers a Member Garden Program and provides support to 23 local gardens. The group is accessible to anyone in the greater Syracuse area who applies, and member gardens can get help finding funding, recruiting volunteers, growing food, and more, with the goal of helping these gardens to prosper. This organization touches the Southwest, Syracuse neighborhood through The Jubilee Homes Southwest Community Farm, which is located at the intersection of Bellevue Ave and Midland Avenue. The program collaborates with the Cornell Cooperative Extension to employ local youth, while also creating a source for healthy food in an urban environment.

=== Syracuse Community Connections Library ===
This 600-square-foot library was established in 1975 and stands as a resource for local residents, with over 6,000 items. This location serves as a meeting space and community event center and offers a place for other community engagement. It serves as a part of the Onondaga County Library system, which offers services to local residents who hold a library card, including computer skills classes, book discussion groups, and movie nights, among many other offerings. All Onondaga County residents are eligible to apply for access to everything they have to offer, and they can call or visit the library website to apply or find information.

=== Food access organizations ===
This neighborhood has many convenience stores but only one full-sized grocery store – a Price Rite, which is located on South Avenue. Prior to 2016, there were no major grocery stores, leaving the community with only corner stores within a reasonable walkable distance for many residents. As a result, there are multiple food pantries and food access organizations. Some popular options are The Salvation Army Food Pantry, Hopps Memorial Church Food Pantry, Southwest Community Center Food Pantry, and New Salem Food Pantry. According to findhelp.org, there are at least 18 major food pantries in the Syracuse city area, with many being close to this neighborhood.
