= Alton Simmons House =

Historic house in New York, United States

- U.S. National Register of Historic Places
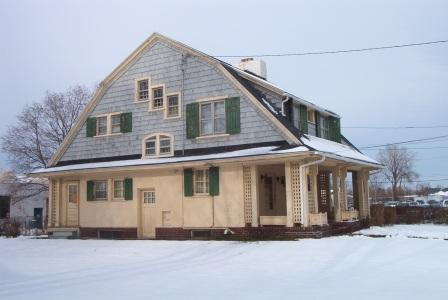

- Location within New York Location within the United States
- Interactive map showing the location of Alton Simmons House
- Location: 309 Van Rensselaer St., Syracuse, New York
- Coordinates: 43°3′9″N 76°10′1″W
- Built: 1912
- Architect: Ward Wellington Ward
- MPS: Architecture of Ward Wellington Ward in Syracuse MPS
- NRHP reference No.: 01001493
- Added to NRHP: January 24, 2002

The Alton Simmons House (also known as the Alton Simmons Residence) is a Ward Wellington Ward-designed home in Syracuse, New York.

== Description and history ==
Built in 1912, it is a 2 1/2-story, gambrel-roofed house which includes a Henry Mercer-tiled fireplace and a number of other notable and unique features. It was listed on the National Register of Historic Places on January 24, 2002.

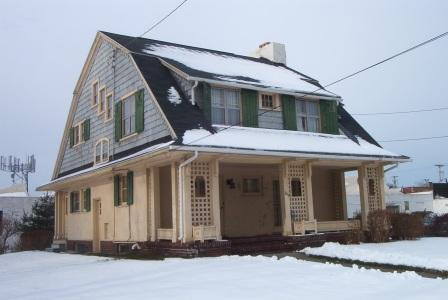

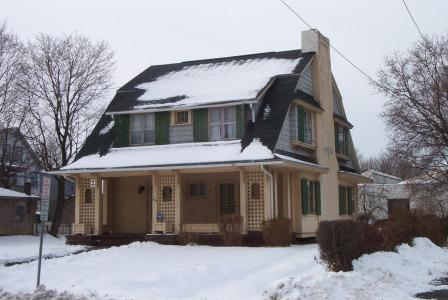
