= North Salina Street Historic District =

Historic district in New York, United States

- U.S. National Register of Historic Places
- U.S. Historic district
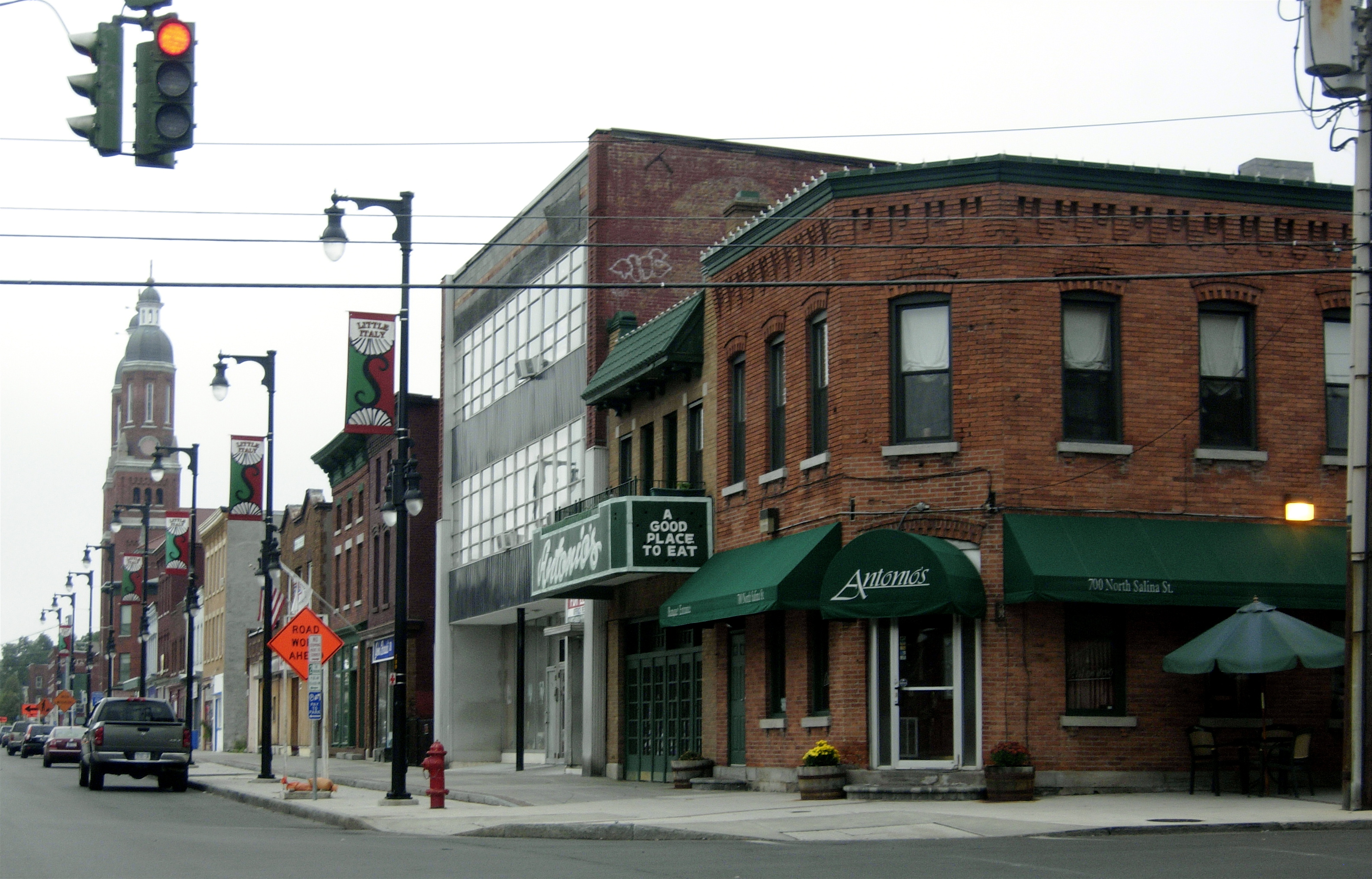
- North Salina Street Historic District, September 2008

- Location within New York Location within the United States
- Location: Portions of Ash, Butternut, Catawba, E. Laurel, E. Willow, Pearl, & N. Salina Sts.; E. Belden & Gephardt Aves., Syracuse, New York
- Coordinates: 43°3′40″N 76°9′15″W
- Area: 12 acres (4.9 ha)
- Architect: Horatio N. White; Multiple
- Architectural style: Greek Revival, Late Victorian, Federal
- NRHP reference No.: 85002441 (original); 100003623 (increase)

Significant dates
- Added to NRHP: September 19, 1985
- Boundary increase: April 5, 2019

The North Salina Street Historic District is a national historic district located on the north side of Syracuse, New York. It encompasses 85 contributing buildings in a section of Syracuse that was home to many German immigrants in the 19th century, and Italian immigrants after the turn of the 20th century. It developed between about 1860 and 1960, and includes examples of Federal, Greek Revival, and Late Victorian style architecture. Notable buildings include Assumption Church (c. 1880) designed by Horatio N. White and Convent (c. 1900), Walier Building (1890), and the Albany Block (c. 1896).

It was added to the National Register of Historic Places in 1985. In 2019 its boundaries were increased to their present location.
