= Harriet May Mills House =

Historic house in New York, United States

- U.S. National Register of Historic Places
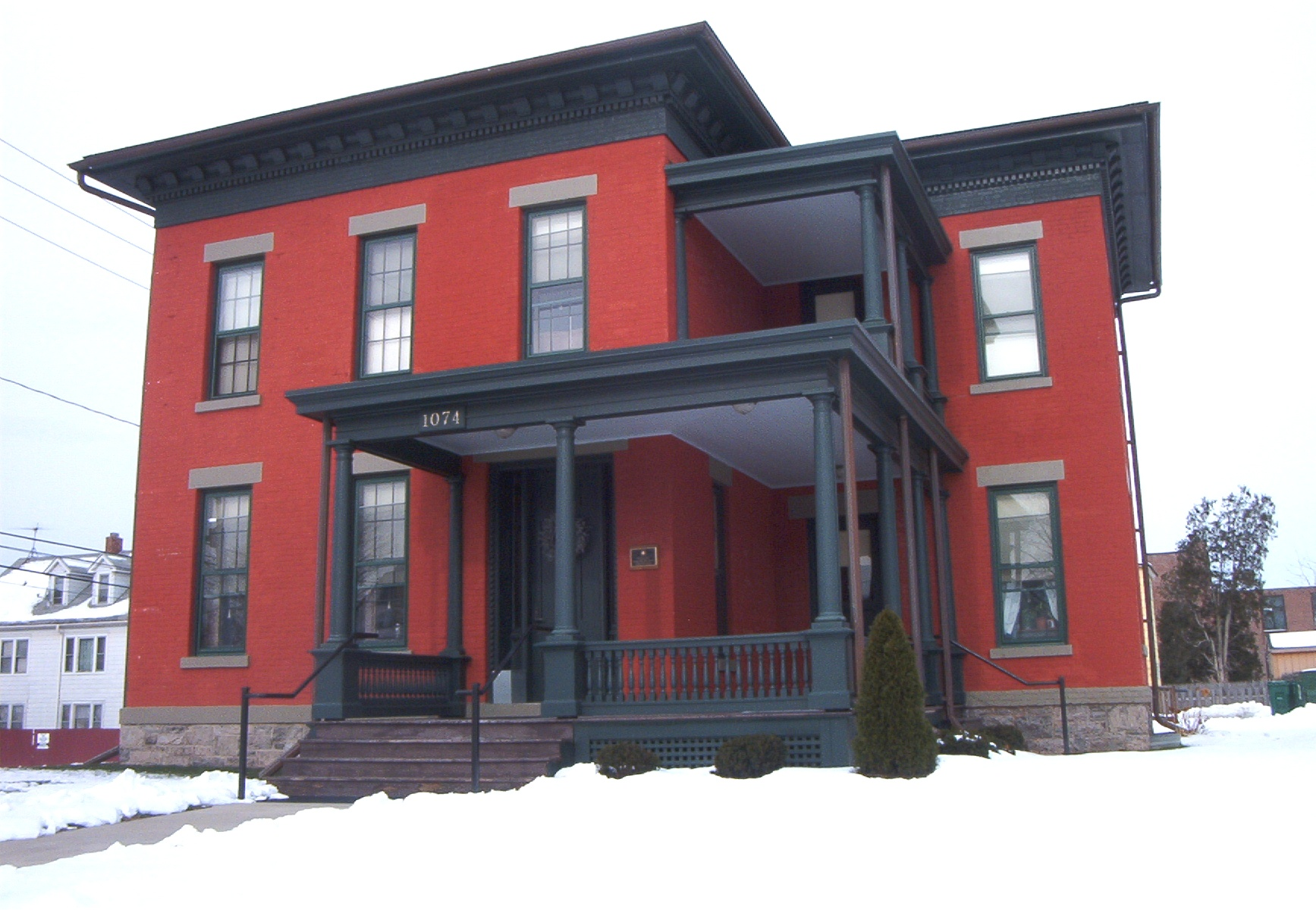

- Location within New York Location within the United States
- Location: 1074 W. Genesee St., Syracuse, New York
- Coordinates: 43°3′14.07″N 76°10′25.81″W
- Built: 1858
- NRHP reference No.: 01001495
- Added to NRHP: January 24, 2002

The Harriet May Mills House or Harriet May Mills Residence is a historic home on the west side of Syracuse, New York. It was listed in the National Register of Historic Places in 2002. Extensive information on the restoration of the home and its former owners is archived on the now-defunct HarrietMayMills.org website.

Charles de Berard Mills and Harriet Ann Mills were abolitionists. Harriet May Mills, their daughter, was active in women's rights. She co-founded a suffragette club, the Political Equality Club, in 1892, which grew rapidly. She was the first female to run for a major statewide office as a candidate of a major political party, running for New York State's Secretary of State in 1920.

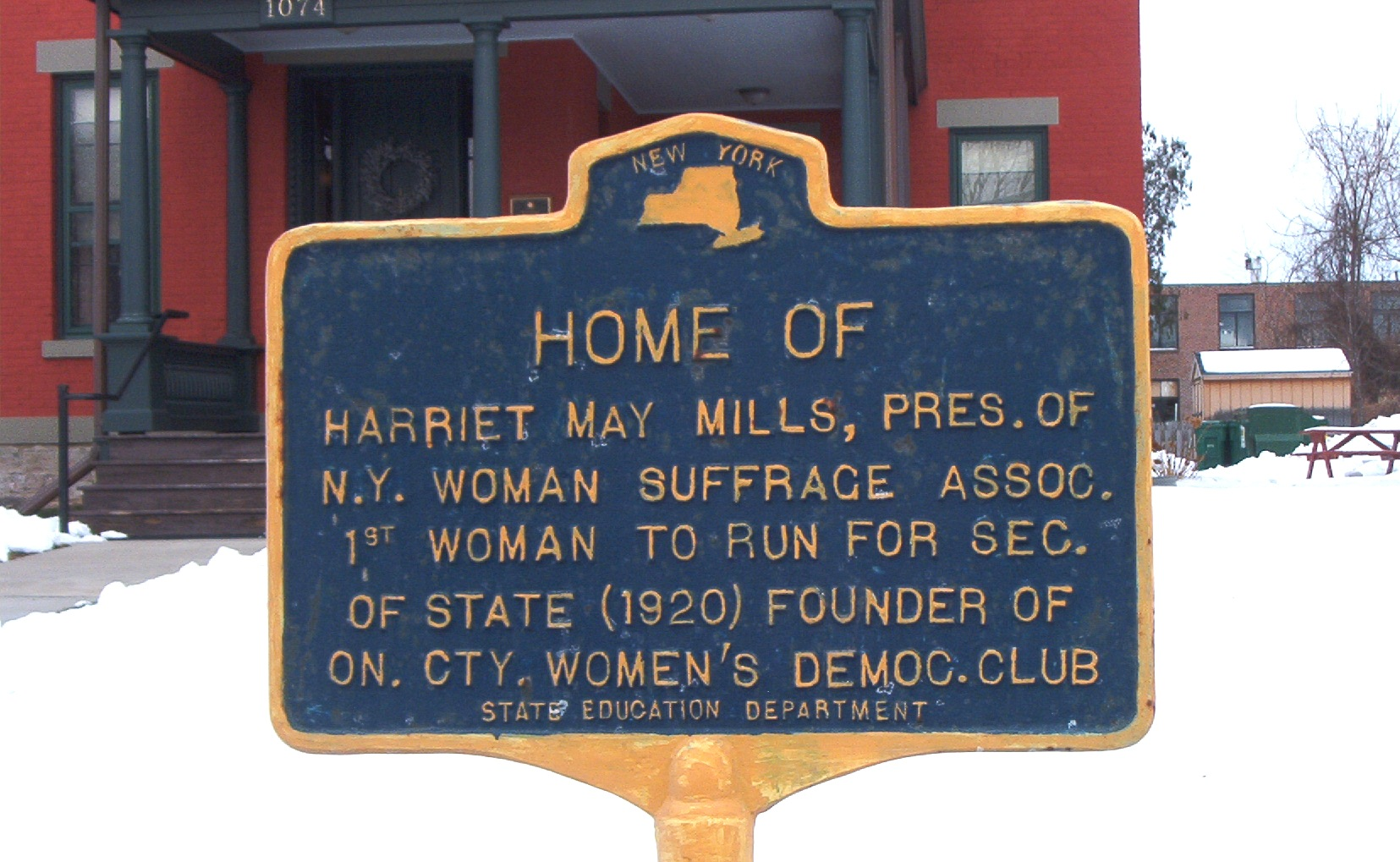

== See also ==
- History of feminism
- List of suffragists and suffragettes
- Women's suffrage
