= Gang House (Syracuse, New York) =

Historic house in New York, United States

- U.S. National Register of Historic Places
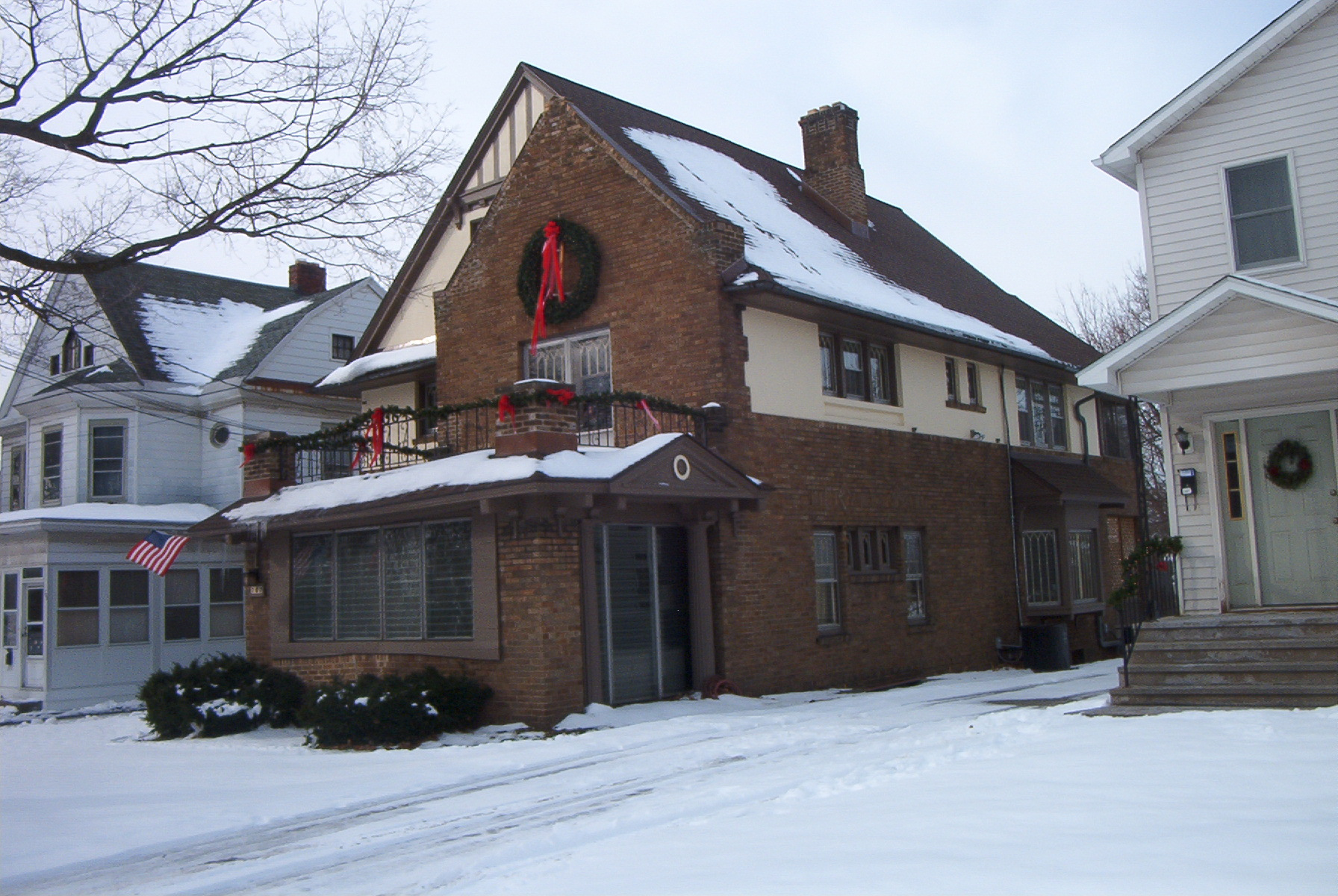

- Location within New York Location within the United States
- Interactive map showing the location of Gang House
- Location: 707 Danforth St., Syracuse, New York
- Coordinates: 43°4′10.42″N 76°9′21.41″W
- Built: 1914
- Architect: Ward Wellington Ward
- Architectural style: Tudor Revival
- MPS: Architecture of Ward Wellington Ward in Syracuse MPS
- NRHP reference No.: 97000073
- Added to NRHP: February 21, 1997

The Gang House, also known as the Gang Residence, is a historic home in Syracuse, New York designed by Ward Wellington Ward. It was built in 1914 and was listed on the National Register of Historic Places in 1997. It served as a bed and breakfast known as the Bed & Breakfast Wellington from around 1988 to 2013.

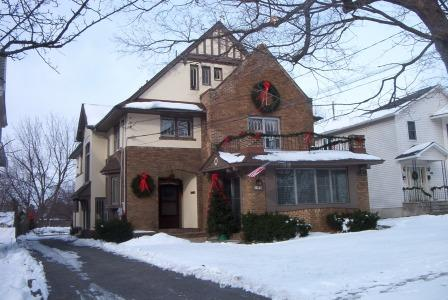

The house is gabled and has a complex facade. It is brick-clad on the first floor exterior, and stuccoed above.

The nearby Chapman House was also designed by Ward.
