= St. Paul's Armenian Apostolic Church =

Historic church in New York, United States

- U.S. National Register of Historic Places
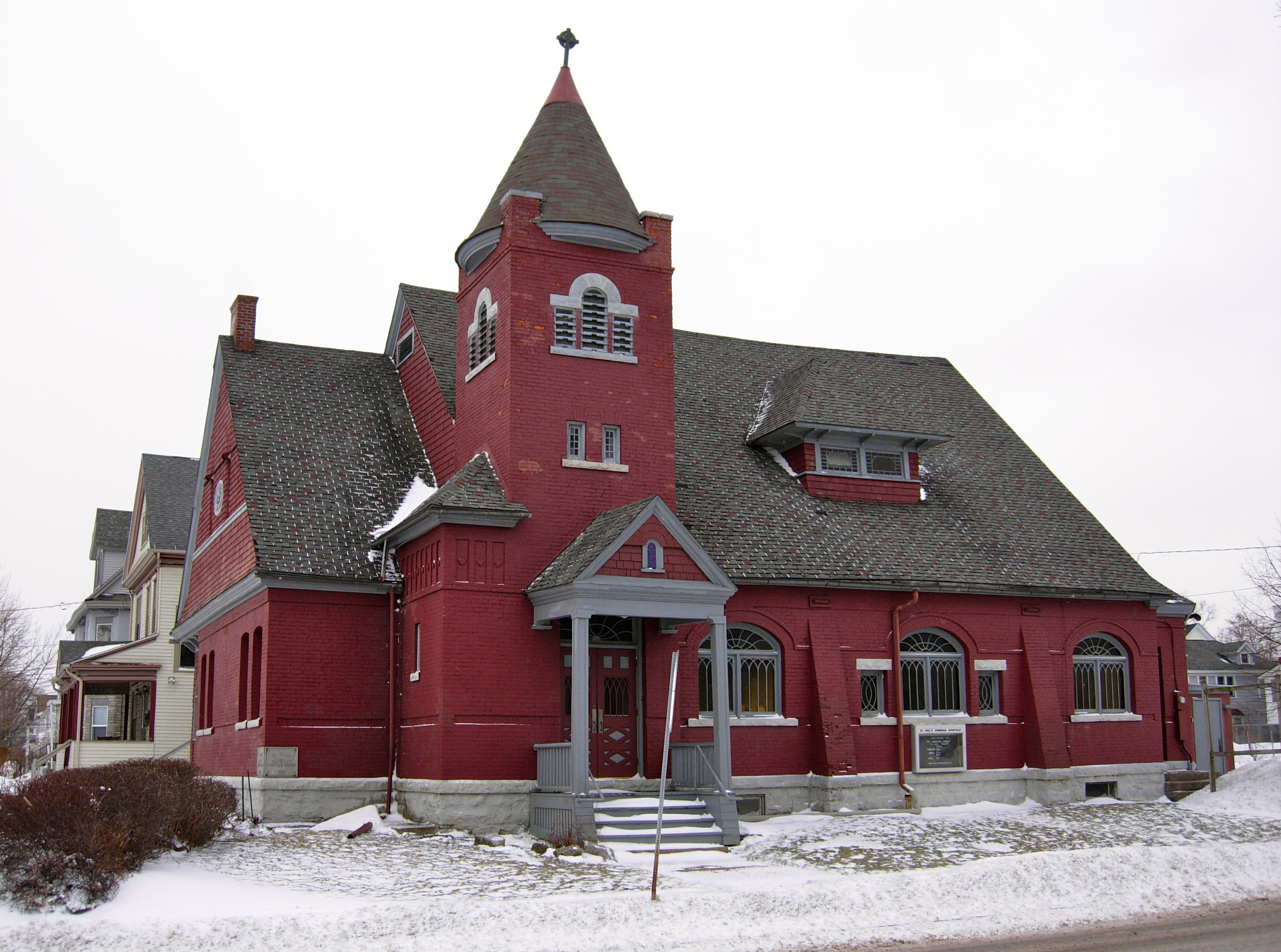

- Location within New York
- Location: 310 N. Geddes St., Syracuse, New York
- Coordinates: 43°3′5.22″N 76°10′14.24″W
- NRHP reference No.: 10000335
- Added to NRHP: June 9, 2010

St. Paul Armenian Apostolic Church is a parish of the Armenian Apostolic Church in Syracuse, New York USA established in 1908.

In 1956 the church bought its current building on North Geddes Street from the Park Avenue Methodist Church. The structure was listed on the U.S. National Register of Historic Places on June 9, 2010.
