= Collins House (Syracuse, New York) =

Historic house in New York, United States

- U.S. National Register of Historic Places
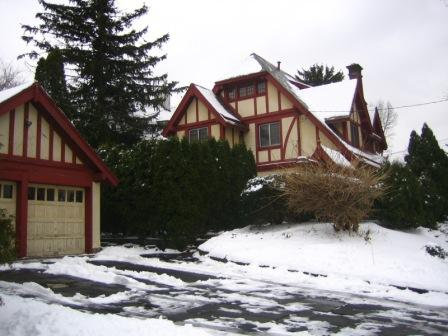

- Location within New York Location within the United States
- Location: 2201 E. Genesee St., Syracuse, New York
- Coordinates: 43°2′44.51″N 76°7′1.19″W
- Built: 1919
- Architect: Ward Wellington Ward
- Architectural style: Tudor Revival
- MPS: Architecture of Ward Wellington Ward in Syracuse MPS
- NRHP reference No.: 97000076
- Added to NRHP: February 14, 1997

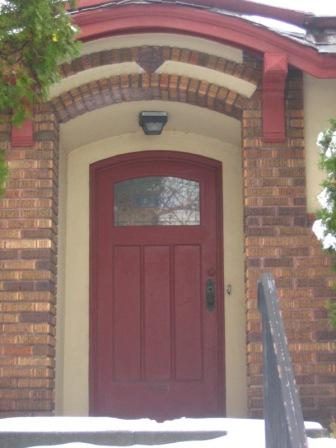
Door detail

Collins House, also known as the Collins Residence, designed by Ward Wellington Ward, was listed on the National Register of Historic Places in 1997.

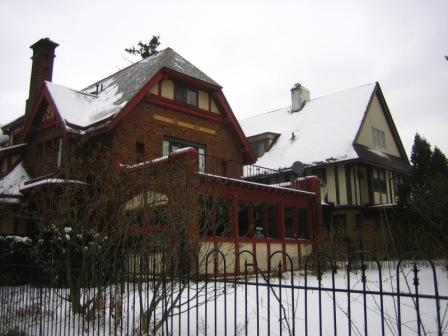
Collins and Kelly Houses

It is adjacent to the Kelly House, also designed by Ward.

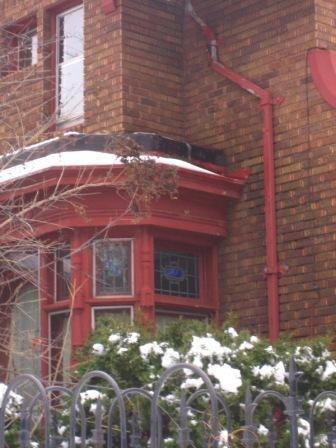
Window detail

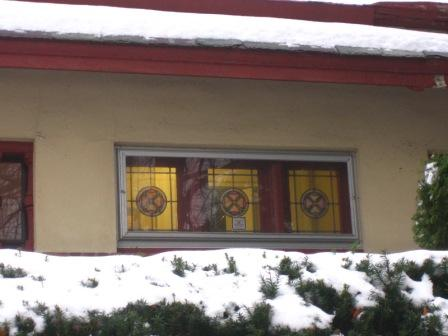
Window detail

The house exhibits decorative details such as stained glass in windows, as appears in other Ward houses.
