= Chapman House (Syracuse, New York) =

Historic house in New York, United States

- U.S. National Register of Historic Places
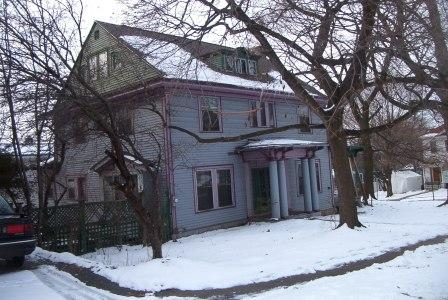

- Location within New York Location within the United States
- Location: 518 Danforth St., Syracuse, New York
- Coordinates: 43°4′2.9″N 76°9′24.8″W
- Built: 1912
- Architect: Ward Wellington Ward
- Architectural style: Colonial Revival
- MPS: Architecture of Ward Wellington Ward in Syracuse MPS
- NRHP reference No.: 97000072
- Added to NRHP: February 14, 1997

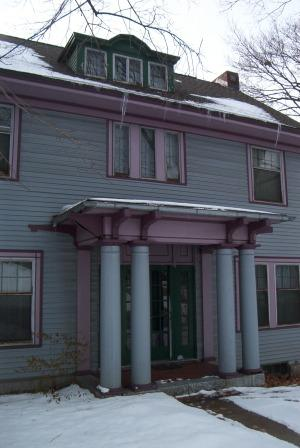

The Chapman House, also known as the Chapman Residence, in Syracuse, New York was built in 1912. Along with other Ward Wellington Ward-designed homes, it was listed on the National Register of Historic Places in 1997.

It shows Colonial Revival and Arts and Crafts elements, and is located at the corner of Danforth and Park, two blocks from North Salina Street.

The nearby Gang House was also designed by Ward.

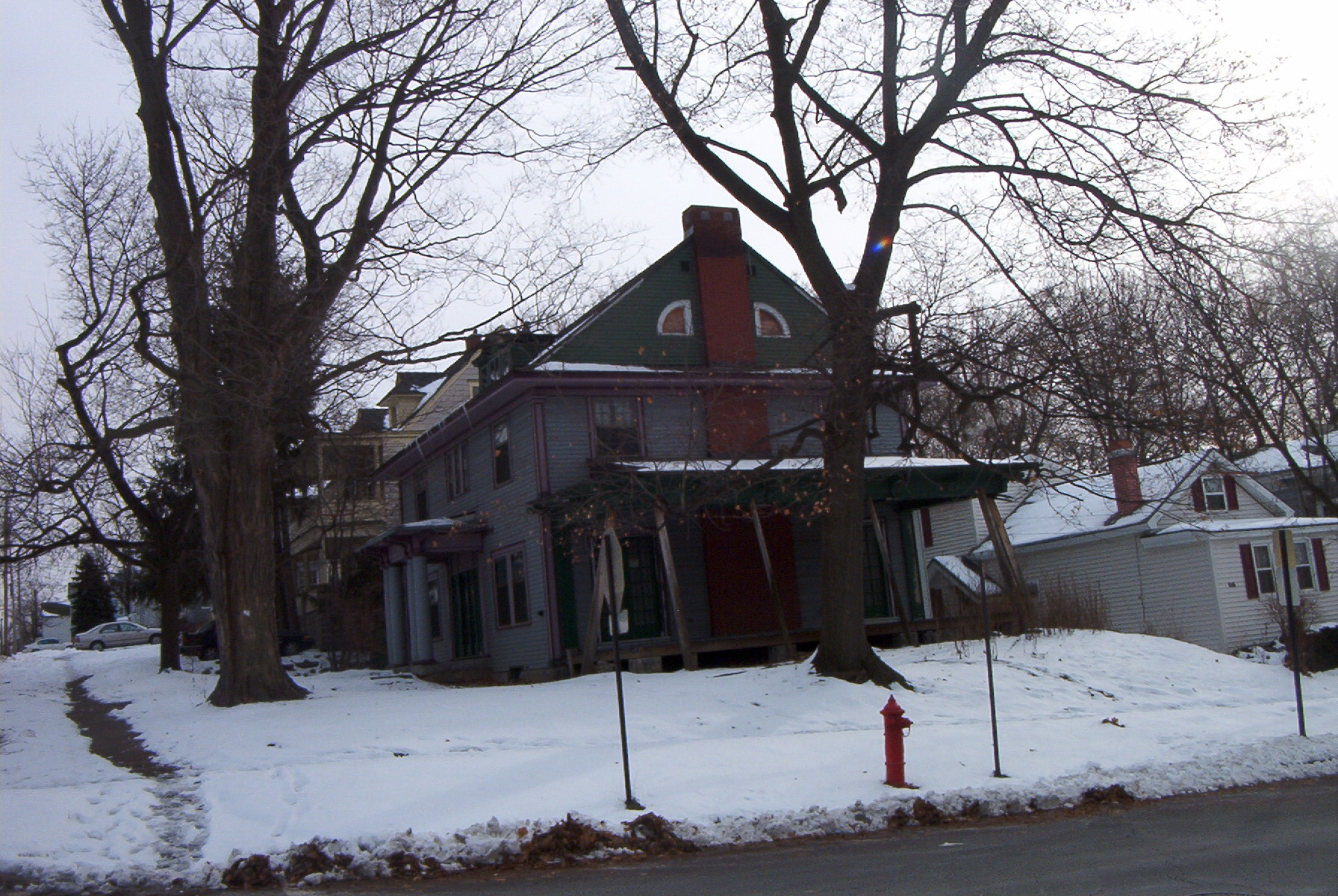
Porch apparently propped up for pillar replacement in December 2007
