= Kelly House (Syracuse, New York) =

Historic house in New York, United States

- U.S. National Register of Historic Places
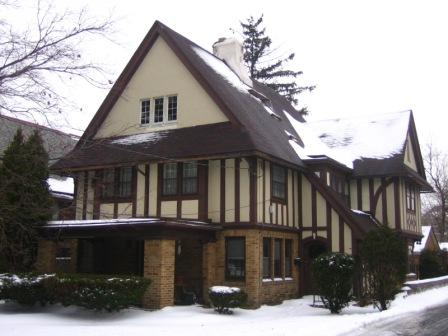

- Location within New York Location within the United States
- Interactive map showing the location of Kelly House
- Location: 2205 E. Genesee St., Syracuse, New York
- Coordinates: 43°2′44.53″N 76°6′58.98″W
- Built: 1923
- Architect: Ward Wellington Ward
- MPS: Architecture of Ward Wellington Ward in Syracuse MPS
- NRHP reference No.: 97000077
- Added to NRHP: February 14, 1997

Kelly House or Kelly Residence is located at 2205 East Genesee Street in Syracuse, New York. It was built in 1923. Along with other Ward Wellington Ward-designed homes such as the adjacent Collins House, it was listed on the National Register of Historic Places in 1997. It is currently a private residence.

The house features a Mercer tile fireplace with tiles depicting 12 trades, and built-in bookcases.

The house fronts on East Genesee Street, but is on an L-shaped lot which provides access to Allen Street as well. The Collins House is at the corner of the two streets.

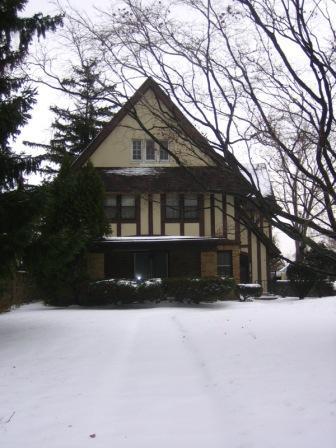
Front, view from East Genesee Street

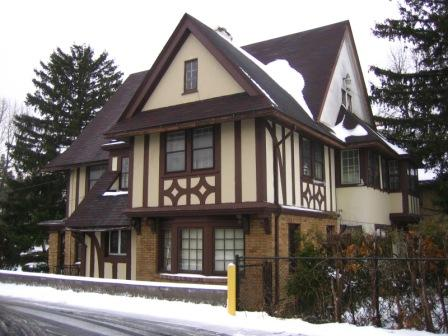
Side and rear

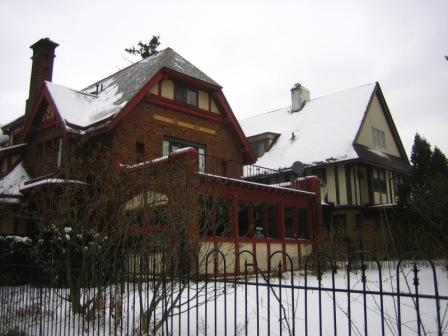
Collins and Kelly houses
