= Near Westside, Syracuse =

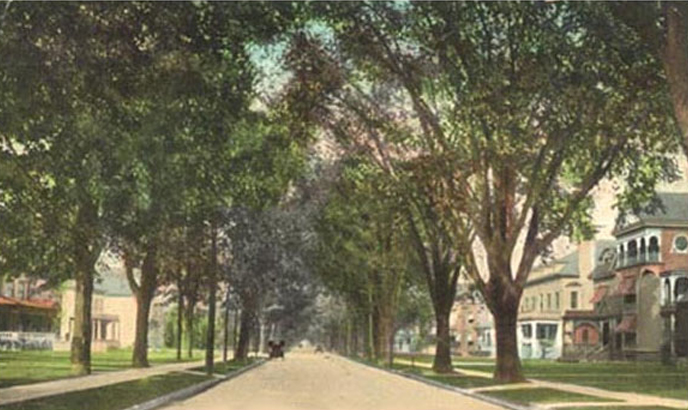
Onondaga Street c.1910

The Near Westside is one of the oldest neighborhoods of Syracuse, New York, United States. In the early 1900s, many wealthy families, including the Mayor of Syracuse, lived in large homes along West Onondaga Street. A beautiful fountain with statues was located at Onondaga Circle, the junction of West Onondaga Street and Delaware Street. Streets like Delaware Street were lined with large elm trees and stately homes.

== History ==
=== Industrial ===
Along the western border of the neighborhood, a multitude of factories employed local residents. These included Franklin Automobile Company, which produced luxury air-cooled cars from 1904 to 1934, and Lipe-Rollway Company, a manufacturer of gears. The main hub of industry started at South Geddes Street, not far from where George Fowler High School and City Hardware of Calley's United Appliance stand today. At the turn of the 19th century, typewriter factories, machinery factories and a large railroad yard along West Fayette Street provided jobs to the residents of the neighborhood.

=== Recent years ===
Today, the Near Westside is home to Syracuse's growing Latino community, with high numbers of Puerto Rican and Cuban families. St Lucy's Catholic Church continues to serve the area and its growing Latino population, offering services for immigrants and refugees at the West Side Learning Center, as well as hosting events such as Latino town hall meetings at the St Lucy's Auditorium.

The area is described as one of America's poorest neighborhoods by United Way of Central New York, with high levels of child poverty. Fowler High School, located on the western end of the neighborhood, has a high percentage of students eligible for free and reduced lunch, among other topics of concern within the community.

The area is served by many non-profit organizations. Several organizations based in this neighborhood provide services for the Latino community, such as the Spanish Action League and Syracuse Area Latinos United against Disparities (SALUD) Inc.

A number of economic and residential development projects have also taken place in the neighborhood's SALT District, led by the Near Westside Initiative, a not-for-profit organization that leverages the resources of Syracuse University. Branding itself as a distinct "neighborhood within a neighborhood", the SALT District has adopted a colorful logo and brand identity of "Syracuse. Arts. Literacy. Technology." The acronym SALT is a reference to the salt production industry that led to Syracuse's nickname, "the Salt City". The Gifford Foundation, Syracuse University's School of Architecture, Syracuse Center of Excellence, and Home HeadQuarters have also played key roles in the initiative.

To the far south of the neighborhood is Syracuse's newly-branded City-Gate Historic Neighborhood (2017). The West Onondaga Street Alliance (WOSA), with the support of Eric Mower & Associates and Cowley Advertising, have taken the initiative to reinvent and improve the neighborhood. The lack of interest in this historic neighborhood for several decades, and the increasing high concentration of poverty, have left the West Onondaga Street Corridor as nothing more than a conduit to reach other nearby neighborhoods. In 2015, the WOSA began to organize to change the direction of the corridor. Today, the City-Gate Historic Neighborhood is a beautiful, historic, and diverse neighborhood. Many business and development opportunities are available.

In 2015, the Everything Oz Museum, a 501c3 non-profit located in Chittenango, New York, purchased the Neal-Baum Mansion for the purpose of opening the nation's largest International Wizard of Oz Museum. L. Frank Baum, author of The Wizard of Oz, married his wife in this house. Baum was born in Chittenango, New York, a nearby suburb of Syracuse.
