= South Beach Psychiatric Center =

State psychiatric hospital in Staten Island, New York

- New York State Office of Mental Health
- State seal of New York

Geography
- Location: 777 Seaview Avenue, Staten Island, New York, United States
- Coordinates: 40.582045°N 74.080922°W

Organization
- Care system: Public
- Type: Psychiatric

History
- Opened: 1969

Links
- Lists: Hospitals in New York State

South Beach Psychiatric Center (SBPC) is a state-operated psychiatric hospital in the South Beach area of Staten Island, New York City. Operated by the New York State Office of Mental Health (OMH), the center provides inpatient and outpatient mental health services for adolescents and adults, serving Staten Island and parts of Brooklyn and Manhattan.

== History ==
South Beach Psychiatric Center was founded in 1969 as part of New York State's mid-20th-century expansion of public mental health services.

The campus sustained severe flood damage during Superstorm Sandy in October 2012.

Post-Sandy redevelopment included a new residential building to replace five existing cottages and was designed as a five-story, 221,000-square-foot facility incorporating recovery-oriented and "normative living environment" concepts. This includes a "Main Street" interior layout with program spaces, including classrooms, a life-skills room, and a spirituality room.

In 2014, OMH announced the opening of a new $42 million Central Services Building intended to replace key infrastructure damaged by storm surge and to improve the resiliency of critical campus operations.

In October 2021, Governor Kathy Hochul and the Dormitory Authority of the State of New York (DASNY) announced the official opening of a new $250 million inpatient building, completing a significant phase of the post-Sandy reconstruction program.

== Services ==
South Beach Psychiatric Center provides treatment and rehabilitation services for adolescents and adults and operates in collaboration with local mental health agencies to support recovery and continuity of care. Services include inpatient psychiatric services, outpatient services, rehabilitation, and recovery-oriented programming

=== Community mental health centers ===
South Beach Psychiatric Center provides outpatient care through a network of community mental health centers in Brooklyn and Staten Island. These are located in the neighborhoods of Bensonhurst, Coney Island, Elm Place, and Mapleton in Brooklyn, as well as Staten Island-based programs such as the South Richmond Assertive Community Treatment program, providing services in patient homes and community settings, and intensive case management services on the main campus. A Fort Hamilton outpatient site operated by SBPC has also been listed in the Coalition for the Homeless Resource Guide.

== Campus and facilities ==
The center is located at 777 Seaview Avenue on Staten Island's eastern shore. State announcements related to post-Sandy reconstruction describe a multi-phase program focused on modernizing facilities and improving flood resilience across the South Beach campus.

The facility was designed for LEED Silver certification and incorporated flood-resilient measures, including raising recreation yards and campus grounds above the 500-year floodplain. The residential building provides 262 behavioral health beds and describes the campus as encompassing approximately 288 acres.

=== Recognition ===
In 2025, the SBPC Residential Building received an Honor Award at the American Institute of Architects New York State (AIA-NYS) Excelsior Awards, recognizing design excellence in the post-Sandy redevelopment of the campus. The redevelopment also received an Excellence in Partnering Award from the Associated General Contractors of New York State.

== See also ==
- New York State Office of Mental Health
- Bronx Psychiatric Center
- Rochester Psychiatric Center
