= Mid-Hudson Forensic Psychiatric Center =

Forensic psychiatric hospital in New Hampton, New York

- New York State Office of Mental Health
- State seal of New York

Geography
- Location: New Hampton, New York, United States
- Coordinates: 41°24′21″N 74°23′33″W

Organization
- Care system: Public
- Type: Psychiatric hospital

Services
- Beds: 285

Links
- Lists: Hospitals in New York State

Mid-Hudson Forensic Psychiatric Center (MHFPC) is a secure adult psychiatric center operated by the New York State Office of Mental Health (OMH) in New Hampton, Orange County, New York. The facility admits patients by court order following judicial findings of incompetence to stand trial or not responsible by reason of mental disease or defect.

In 2013, OMH's statewide restructuring plan proposed shifting Mid-Hudson's inpatient forensic capacity to other forensic centers, citing facility age and high estimated reconstruction costs. State officials later reversed plans to close the facility, with local officials and labor representatives arguing it provided critical capacity and jobs in the region.

== History ==
The Mid-Hudson campus originated as the New York City Reformatory at New Hampton, also known as New Hampton Farms, which opened in 1916 to replace the city's reformatory on Hart Island. Descriptions of the reformatory emphasize agricultural, forestry, and construction work as part of its rehabilitation programs.

Following a directive in 1945, the State of New York was permitted temporary use of a facility known as "Cubicle Building No. 1" at the New Hampton reformatory.

In the 1958–59 New York State budget, the state reported that it had acquired "New Hampton Farms in Orange County" through a lease–purchase arrangement for conversion to a training school for boys. The campus was later transferred to New York State and converted in the 1970s to a forensic psychiatric hospital, later known as Mid-Hudson Forensic Psychiatric Center.

== Services ==
=== Inpatient services and patient population ===
Mid-Hudson Forensic Psychiatric Center is a secure adult psychiatric center that provides evaluation, treatment, and rehabilitation to patients admitted by court order, including individuals found "incompetent to stand trial" or "not responsible by reason of mental disease or defect".

MHFPC serving patients committed under several legal authorities, including New York Criminal Procedure Law (CPL) § 730 (capacity to stand trial); CPL § 330.20 (not criminally responsible due to mental disease or defect); Part 57 of the Mental Hygiene Regulations (civil patients requiring confinement in a maximum-security setting) and Correction Law § 508 (pre-sentenced inmates transferred for psychiatric treatment). MHFPC receives admissions from across New York State, with 60% from New York City. The hospital consists of 18 units, including mixed-gender units.

As of 2025, it has a total bed capacity of 285, including specialized settings such as an acute care unit for patients with serious medical issues, a special services unit for patients with acute behavioral problems, and a unit for substance-use treatment.

=== Length of stay ===
OMH reported that systemwide, CPL § 730 patients treated had an average length of stay of 162 days in 2023.

=== Staffing ===
A New York State Office of the State Comptroller audit of overtime practices reported that, as of March 31, 2007, Mid-Hudson Forensic Psychiatric Center employed 590 individuals, with payroll expenses of $31.9 million and overtime costs of 5.6 million in fiscal year 2006–20707.

=== Training programs ===
MHFPC offers psychology training programs. The MHFPC Psychology Doctoral Internship Training Program brochure describes a full-time doctoral internship. It states that the program is a member of the Association of Psychology Postdoctoral and Internship Centers and American Psychological Association-accredited "on Contingency", a status granted to newer programs that have not had enough students to generate the required outcome data for full accreditation.

== Proposed closure and public response ==
In 2013, the Regional Centers of Excellence plan described Mid-Hudson as nearing the end of its useful life and proposed shifting inpatient capacity to forensic centers in Manhattan and Rochester.

The New York State Assembly's Committee on Mental Health and Developmental Disabilities stated that the OMH plan contemplated closure of several psychiatric centers and legislative committees held hearings around the state, including a hearing at the Middletown City Council Chambers to discuss the proposed closure of Mid-Hudson Forensic Psychiatric Center.

Professional and advocacy organizations also weighed in on the broader plan. The New York State Psychiatric Association published a position statement expressing concern that closing state hospitals without adequate community-based safety nets could have serious negative consequences for people needing acute care. The Alliance for Rights and Recovery (then NYAPRS) published an early summary of the plan and emphasized reinvestment of savings into community-based nonprofit services.

In 2017, OMH reversed plans to close the facility, stating the closure plan would have reduced the number of state psychiatric centers and that local officials argued the facility was one of only a few forensic centers statewide.

In 2019, DASNY described plans for a replacement forensic inpatient building with 250 beds, intended to be constructed while the existing facility remains in operation. (Currently as of June 20, 2026 is being built).

== See also ==
- Kirby Forensic Psychiatric Center
- Central New York Psychiatric Center
- New York State Office of Mental Health
