= Manhattan State Hospital =

Manhattan State Hospital can refer to two New York State run psychiatric hospitals for residents of Manhattan that now have different names following state takeovers in the 1890s:

- Manhattan Psychiatric Center on Wards Island in New York City
- Central Islip Psychiatric Center in Central Islip, New York

== See also ==
- New York State Psychiatric Institute in Manhattan, New York City
