= Victoria Arango =

American academic

Victoria Arango is an American neuroscientist who until 2017, was a professor of clinical neurobiology (in Psychiatry) in the Department of Psychiatry at Columbia University. She was the director of the Diane Goldberg Laboratory for the Molecular Imaging of Neural Disorders (MIND) and the Laboratory of Chemical Neuroanatomy. She was also the associate director of the Division of Molecular Imaging and Neuropathology at the New York State Psychiatric Institute.

Arango pioneered anatomical studies in the brain of suicide decedents, including biochemical, molecular and morphometric studies and her work was instrumental in bringing the utmost in scientific rigor to studies in postmortem human brain. These efforts have led to new findings and collaborations with leaders of the field. Her work has focused on identifying brain biological abnormalities in mood disorders, suicide and alcoholism. Arango serves on the board of directors for the American Foundation of Suicide Prevention and is a council member of the Brain and Behavior Research Foundation. She was the president of the Society of Biological Psychiatry in 2024 and is the president elect of the American College of Neuropsychopharmacology. She is a long-time member of the Society for Neuroscience, the International Academy of Suicide Research, and the American Society of Hispanic Psychiatry. Arango received NIH funding to study suicide for over 30 years. She has published extensively in national and international journals and is considered an international expert in the field of the biology of suicide. She received the Research Award by the American Foundation of Suicide Prevention and the coveted Morselli Medal, a life achievement award for the study of suicide.

She was recruited by the NIMH in 2017, as the chief of the Central-Peripheral Interactions Pathophysiology Program in the Division of Translational Research. Currently, she is an adjunct professor at the University Of Maryland School of Medicine.

== Sources ==
- Department of Psychiatry, Columbia University College of Physicians and Surgeons
- New York State Psychiatric Institute
- Faculty Profile for Victoria Arango, Ph.D.
