= Richard H. Hutchings Psychiatric Center =

State psychiatric hospital in Syracuse, New York

- New York State Office of Mental Health
- Seal of New York

Geography
- Location: 620 Madison Street, Syracuse, New York, United States
- Coordinates: 43.045748°N 76.139670°W

Organization
- Care system: Public
- Type: Psychiatric

Links
- Lists: Hospitals in New York State

Richard H. Hutchings Psychiatric Center (often called Hutchings Psychiatric Center) is a state-operated psychiatric hospital in Syracuse, New York, run by the New York State Office of Mental Health (OMH). The center provides inpatient and outpatient mental health services for adults, and for children and adolescents in Central New York.

== Facilities and services ==
Hutchings as a comprehensive, community-based facility providing an integrated network of inpatient and outpatient services for adults and youth in the Central New York region, operating on a 12-building campus in Syracuse's University's Hill district.

It has 105 adult inpatient beds in three units and 30 inpatient beds for children and adolescents, and also provides outpatient services for adults and adolescents.

=== Education and training ===
SUNY Upstate Medical University's Department of Psychiatry lists Hutchings as a primary affiliate and teaching site. Psychiatry residents rotate at Hutchings during postgraduate years 1 and 2 for inpatient child, geriatric, and community psychiatry experience, and senior electives are available in psychosocial rehabilitation.

=== Madison Street Clinic (downtown Syracuse) ===
In 2016, Hutchings opened a renovated Madison Street outpatient clinic in downtown Syracuse. It's the area's largest adult outpatient behavioral-health clinic and noted the addition of primary-care services alongside psychiatric care.

== History ==
Hutchings' role in Central New York's public mental health system has been the subject of periodic state-level policy debate. In 2003, Governor George Pataki proposed closing Hutchings and relocating patients, prompting a public hearing by the New York State Assembly Standing Committee on Mental Health, Mental Retardation and Developmental Disabilities.

In 2018, the New York State Assembly Youth Mental Health Task Force—formed following proposals affecting youth services at Hutchings—issued a report on gaps in children's behavioral-health services in the region and recommendations to improve access and coordination of care.

In 2022, investigative reporting on statewide children's mental-health capacity and staffing shortages referenced Hutchings in describing constraints on pediatric psychiatric beds at state-operated facilities.

== Renovations and capital projects ==
In 2018, Hutchings announced completion of a multi-phase inpatient building renovation project described as a 10-year, $50 million capital investment, including space for children, adolescents and adult inpatient programs. DASNY's 2019 annual report also discussed features added through the renovation work, such as consolidated treatment areas and rehabilitative program space. In 2024, Hutchings facilities underwent infrastructure improvements and infrastructure improvements and additions. DASNY's FY 2024–25 operations/accomplishments document also listed additional Hutchings campus infrastructure projects (e.g., boilers, roof work, air-handling and cooling components).

== Oversight and incidents ==
In a 2010 report on restraints of children and young adults, released by the New York Office of Mental Health, the rate was .33 per 1,000 patient hours, or 4.5 hours per month -- second only two Elmira Psychiatric Center, which was calculated to be .35 per 1,000 patient hours. In 2016, the New York State Offices of the Inspector General published an investigation into the theft of SNAP benefits from a resident of a Hutchings community residents and discussed corrective actions.

== See also ==
- New York State Department of Health
- New York City Department of Health and Mental Hygiene
- New York State Board for Mental Health Practitioners
