= Charlie Chop-off =

Unidentified serial killer

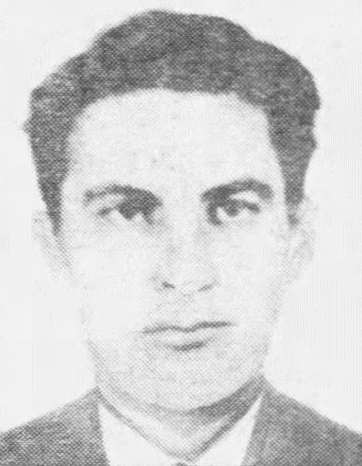
- One of several composite sketches released by the NYPD of Charlie Chop-off
- Other names: The Mad Barber; The Pied Piper of Manhattan
- Conviction: Never convicted
- Penalty: Never sentenced

Details
- Victims: 4 killed; 1 survived
- Span of crimes: March 9, 1972 – August 17, 1973
- Country: United States
- State: New York

Charlie Chop-off is the pseudonym given to an unidentified American serial killer known to have killed three black children and one Puerto Rican child in Manhattan between 1972 and 1973. The assailant is also known to have attempted to murder one other child.

All the victims of Charlie Chop-off were male, and all but one of the attacks involved genital mutilation or attempted genital mutilation of the victims.

While the case is still considered an open one, Ernesto "Erno" Soto was held as a suspect and confessed to one of the murders, but was considered unfit for trial in December 1976 and returned to a mental institution.

== Murders ==
On March 9, 1972, eight-year-old Douglas Owens was found dead, stabbed 38 times. His penis had been cut but not severed from his body. On April 20, another black youth was repeatedly stabbed; his genitals were severed from his body, although he survived his injuries. On October 23, ten-year-old Wendell Hubbard was stabbed to death on the roof of an East Harlem tenement block. His penis had also been severed from his body.

On March 6, 1973, a nine-year-old Puerto Rican child named Luis Ortiz was stabbed 38 times and likewise mutilated. Finally, on August 17, 1973, eight-year-old Steven Cropper was repeatedly slashed with a razor on the roof of a tenement block. He bled to death from an injury to his arm, although his penis was left intact.

== Erno Soto ==
Soto leaving the New York County Courthouse, January 1993

After the botched abduction of a Puerto Rican boy on May 15, 1974, Ernesto Soto, 33, was arrested by the police while "babbling a religious slogan." He had been an intermittent patient at the Manhattan State Hospital since 1968 and was described as an unemployed former drug addict. Soto confessed to the 1973 slaying of Cropper. His only surviving victim did say that Soto looked like his attacker but refused to positively identify him. Manhattan State Hospital officials stated that Soto was in their custody at the time of the murder but also later confirmed that he might have escaped confinement, as it had happened before.

Despite a lack of evidence, investigators still believe that he is a likely suspect, citing the fact that the murders ceased after his arrest and that an anonymous source placed him as a potential culprit on the first killing. However, due to his acute mental instability, he is unlikely to stand trial.

In 1993, Soto's lawyers requested that he be released from Kirby Forensic Psychiatric Center and placed in a "non-secure hospital," despite continued violent behavior and Soto claiming he still felt the need to "sacrifice someone to God."

=== "Miguel Rivera" ===
In 1975, Barbara Gelb published On the Track of Murder and used Miguel Rivera as a pseudonym for Soto. Since then, numerous authors, such as Peter Vronsky or Lane and Gregg, have erroneously cited the name as being that of the killer.

== See also ==
- List of fugitives from justice who disappeared
- List of serial killers in the United States

== Cited works and further reading ==
- Vronsky, Peter (2004). Serial Killers: The Method and Madness of Monsters. New York: Penguin Group (USA) Inc. ISBN 978-1-101-20462-7.
- Newton, Michael (2006). The Encyclopedia of Serial Killers. New York: Infobase. ISBN 0-8160-6195-5.
