= Western New York Children's Psychiatric Center =

State psychiatric hospital for children in West Seneca, New York

- New York State Office of Mental Health
- State seal of New York

Geography
- Location: 1010 East and West Road, West Seneca, New York, United States
- Coordinates: 42.82031°N 78.73414°W

Organization
- Care system: Public
- Type: Psychiatric hospital

Services
- Beds: 46

History
- Opened: 1970

Links
- Lists: Hospitals in New York State

Western New York Children's Psychiatric Center (WNYCPC) is a state-operated psychiatric hospital for children and adolescents in West Seneca, Erie County, New York. Operated by the New York State Office of Mental Health (OMH), the facility provides inpatient psychiatric treatment and community-based services for youth ages 4–18 in Western New York.

== History ==
The facility was built in 1970 to treat children with severe psychiatric problems.

=== Proposed relocation and litigation (2016–2018) ===
In 2016–2017, OMH proposed relocating WNYCPC's inpatient services to the campus of Buffalo Psychiatric Center, drawing opposition from local elected officials, clinicians, families, and advocates.

In July 2017, a citizens' coalition filed a lawsuit seeking to block the planned closure or relocation of the West Seneca facility. In November 2017, Governor Andrew Cuomo vetoed legislation that would require WNYCPC to remain open in West Seneca. In April 2018, Cuomo announced that WNYCPC would remain in West Seneca.

=== Renovation and expansion ===
In 2022, OMH broke ground on a $55 million renovation and expansion project that would add 50,000 square feet of residential and clinical support space and improve existing educational, administrative, and therapeutic areas, while preserving the facility's 46-bed capacity.

The Dormitory Authority of the State of New York (DASNY) later described the expansion project as becoming a $66.5 million renovation and addition project; DASNY's 2024 annual report stated that the project was advancing but had been delayed.

=== Allegations and legal claims ===
A 1990 report by the New York State Commission on Quality of Care for the Mentally Disabled investigated allegations of child abuse and neglect at WNYCPC. In 2021, Child Victims Act lawsuits alleging abuse at the facility in the 1980s and referenced prior state inquiries into the facility.

== Services ==
WNYCPC provides inpatient psychiatric treatment and a range of outpatient and community-based programs, including day treatment, an outpatient clinic, care management, and mobile teams. The center delivers educational services under New York State Education Department regulations.

=== Day treatment ===
The WNYCPC day treatment program provides community-based mental health services integrated with a school setting through a partnership between Erie 1 BOCES and OMH.

== Education and training ==
WNYCPC hosts training programs, including a doctoral psychology internship and clinical training rotations for medical trainees.

=== Psychology doctoral internship ===
OMH describes WNYCPC's Psychology Doctoral Internship Training Program as an Association of Psychology Postdoctoral and Internship Centers (APPIC) member program that provides training in both inpatient and day-treatment settings. The internship participates in the National Matching Services (APPIC Match).

=== Medical education rotations ===
WNYCPC is listed as a participating institution for the University at Buffalo Child and Adolescent Psychiatry program in the American Medical Association's FREIDA directory. The University at Buffalo's fellowship curriculum materials describe rotations at WNYCPC, including intermediate length-of-stay inpatient services and day treatment experiences.

== See also ==
- New York State Office of Mental Health
- Buffalo Psychiatric Center
