= University Hill, Syracuse =

Neighborhood and business district in Syracuse, New York

Coordinates: 43°2′30″N 76°8′8″W

The Hill
- Neighborhood
- University Hill, Syracuse
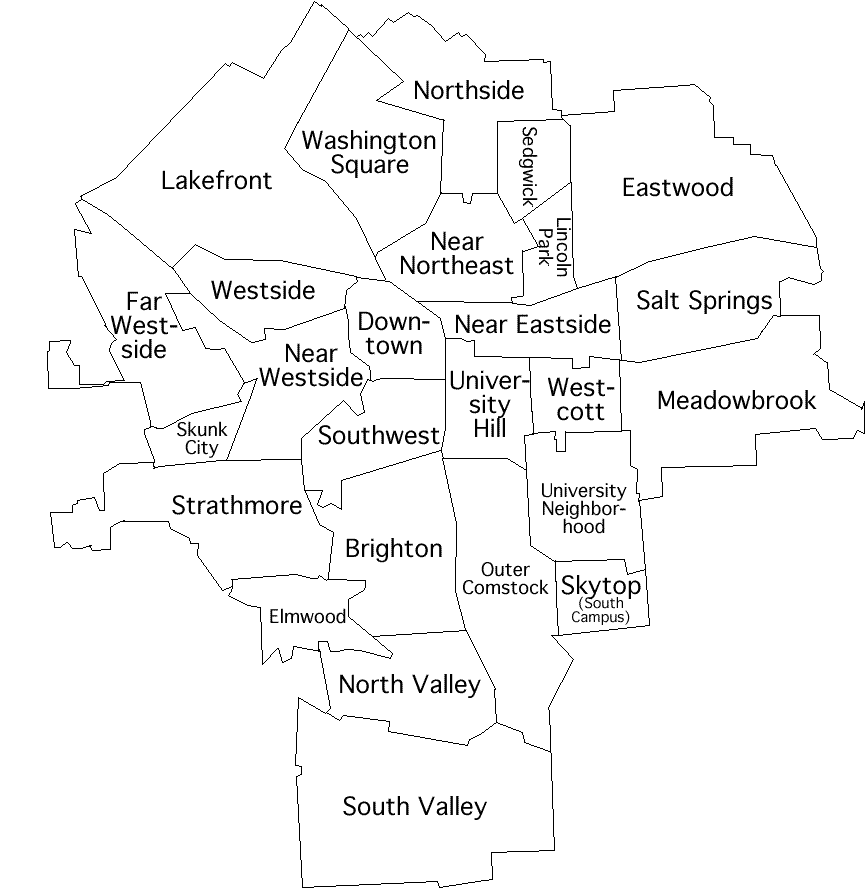
- Interactive map of The Hill
- Annexed: 1835

Population (2008)
  - Total: 11,000
- ZIP code: 13210, 13244

University Hill is a neighborhood and business district in Syracuse, New York, located east and southeast of Downtown Syracuse, on one of the larger hills in Syracuse. The neighborhood is bounded on the west by Almond Street and Interstate 81. It continues east to Ostrom Avenue and Thornden Park, where it borders the Westcott and University neighborhoods. Interstate 690 currently serves as the neighborhood's northern boundary.

University Hill is the major educational and medical district of Syracuse, as well as an important business district, with three of the top ten employers in the Syracuse region located there. The most expansive of these is Syracuse University, from which the neighborhood's name derives. "The Hill" is also to home a Veterans Administration Medical Center, the State University of New York Upstate Medical University, State University of New York College of Environmental Science and Forestry, as well as Crouse Hospital and the Richard H. Hutchings Psychiatric Center. These five institutions account for over 16,000 full-time positions and over 20,000 students.

== Demographics ==
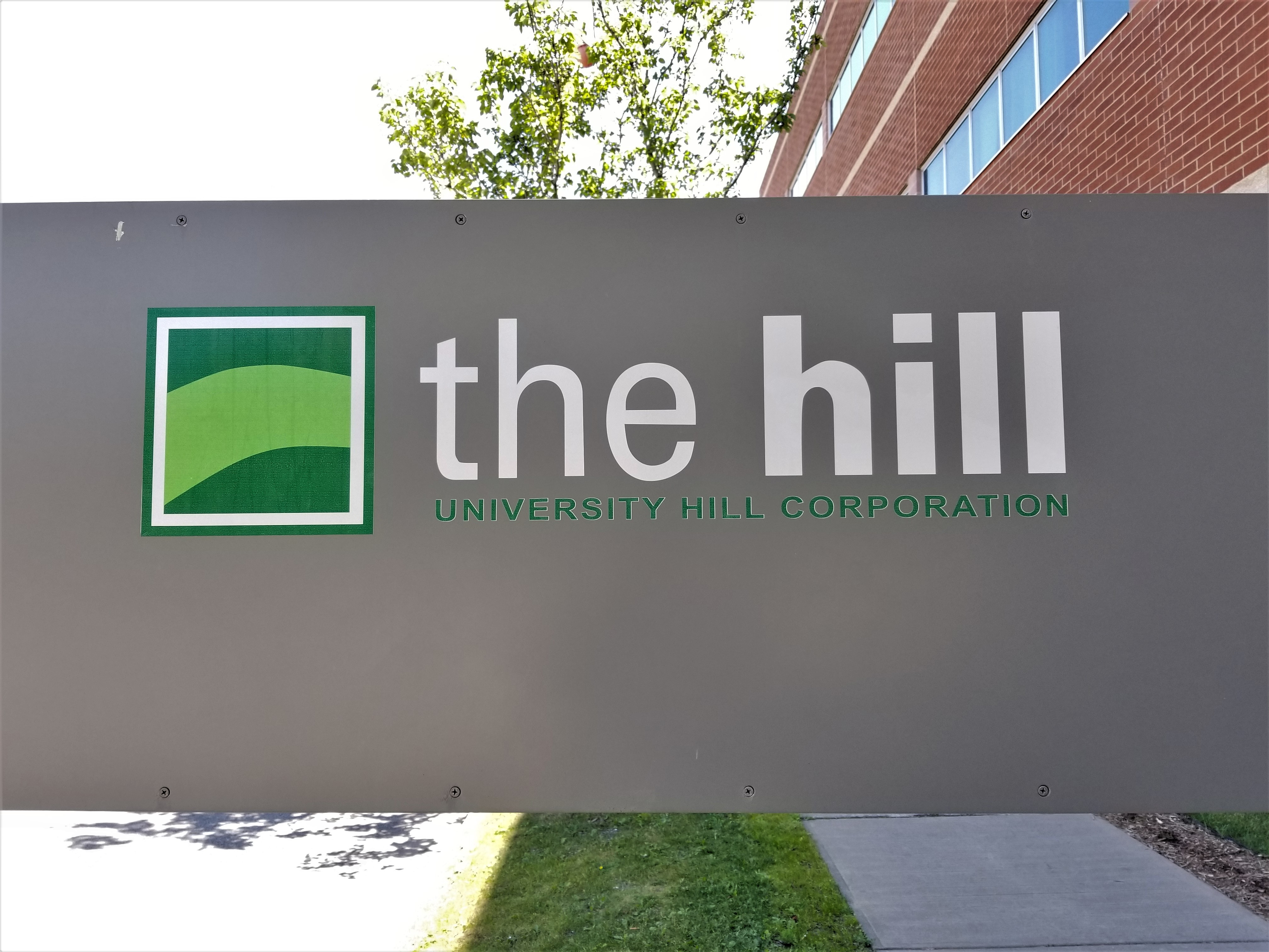
Signage on University Hill

Syracuse University, SUNY ESF, and Upstate Medical University together house nearly 10,000 students in student housing on the hill, with many others living in private, off-campus housing in the neighborhood.

As students make up the majority (around eighty percent) of the residents, census data might appear odd when comparing other neighborhoods. For example, the 2000 Census indicated that 66.8 percent of University Hill's population walked to work, more than six times the citywide average. Only limited parking is available in much of the neighborhood, making walking an attractive option. Student renting also explains the lack of owner-occupied housing, and low median household income.

It is estimated by the University Hill Corporation that over 20,000 people work on "The Hill," with a combined payroll of over $400 million annually. Only the downtown neighborhood employs more people in Syracuse.

The neighborhood has two business districts, Marshall Street and East Genesee Street. Marshall, the larger of the two, has dozens of shops, restaurants, and bars, as well as the Syracuse University Sheraton. East Genesee is lined with three upscale hotels, several shops and eateries, and Syracuse Stage, the performance venue of the Syracuse University drama department.

== History ==
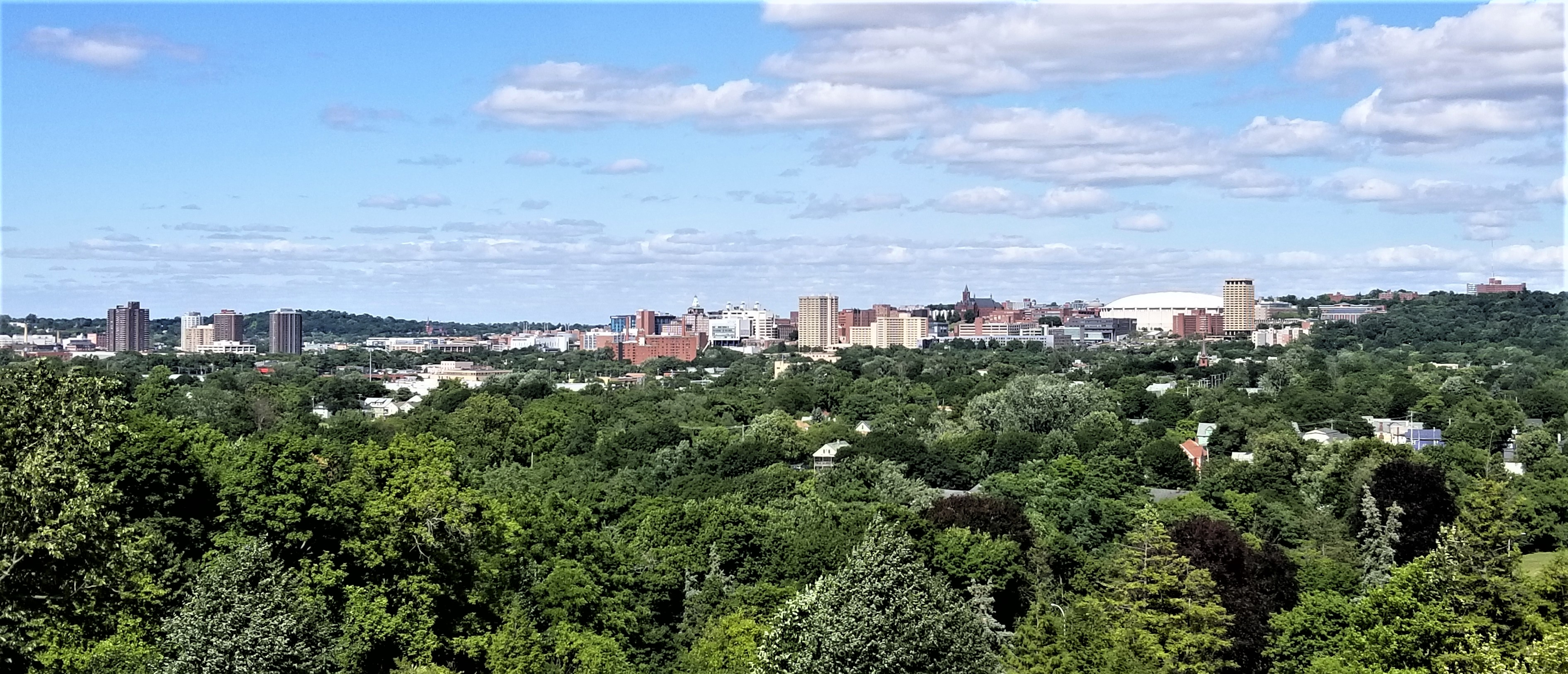
University Hill skyline (2018)

As part of the negotiations that brought the former Genesee College from Lima, New York to Syracuse, George F. Comstock, a member of the university's board of trustees, offered the school 50 acres (20 ha) of farmland in this area of the city. In January 1871, Bishop Jesse Peck, the first chairman of the Board of Trustees, described what was, in effect, the university's first master plan: a scheme for the construction of seven new buildings on Comstock's hillside, each to be dedicated to a different academic discipline. Peck's vision for the new campus was one of stylistic eclecticism; on one occasion, he declared that the new university should "demonstrate the perfect harmony and indissoluble oneness of all that is valuable in the old and the new."

The Hall of Languages, completed in 1873, stood as the only manifestation of the university's first campus plan for a long time. The Panic of 1873 interrupted the institution's further development, and the Hall of Languages housed the entire University for fourteen years.

While the Hall of Languages was being built on his old property, George Comstock purchased 200 acres (81 ha) of the Stevens farm to the north of University Place. By 1872, Comstock had deeded Walnut Park, the centerpiece of his new "Highlands" subdivision, to the city, and successfully parceled out residential lots to the local elite. This greensward, extending northward from University Place, was soon bordered on both sides by large and gracious homes. From the beginning, Comstock intended Syracuse University and the Highlands to develop as an integrated whole; a contemporary account described the latter as "a beautiful town...springing up on the hillside and a community of refined and cultivated membership...established near the spot which will soon be the center of a great and beneficent educational institution."

By the end of the 1880s, the university had resumed construction on the south side of University Place. Holden Observatory (1887) was followed by two Romanesque Revival buildings – von Ranke Library (1889), now Tolley Administration Building, and Crouse College (1889). Together with the Hall of Languages, these first buildings formed the basis for the "Old Row," a grouping which, along with its companion Lawn, established one of Syracuse's most enduring images. The emphatically linear organization of these buildings along the brow of the hill follows a tradition of American campus planning which dates to the construction of the "Yale Row" in the 1790s. At Syracuse, the Old Row continued to provide the framework for its growth well into the twentieth century. The university now has over 250 buildings on University Hill.

The Crouse College, Syracuse University, Estabrook House, Grace Episcopal Church, Hall of Languages, Syracuse University, Pi Chapter House of Psi Upsilon Fraternity, Sherbrook Apartments, Syracuse University – Comstock Tract buildings, Temple Society of Concord, and Walnut Park Historic District are listed on the National Register of Historic Places.

== Future ==
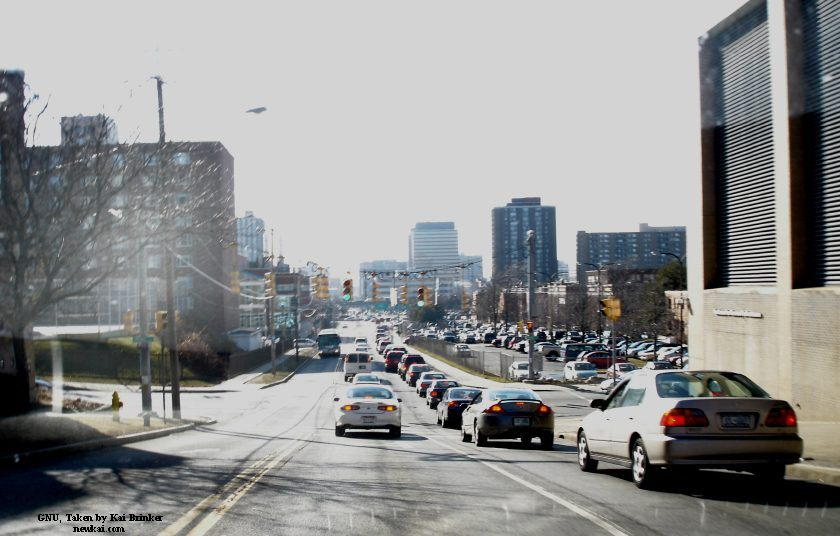
Traffic leaving University Hill towards Interstate 81 and Downtown (2005)

University Hill continues to grow, led by expansions by Syracuse University and Upstate Medical University. In 2005, SU finished a new 150,000 square foot (14,000 m^{2}) building for the Martin J. Whitman School of Management. A major problem facing University Hill is traffic. Many roads are only two-lane, and cannot handle rush hour traffic. Some streets have been widened but many are lined with houses and buildings, often historic, that prevent adding motor vehicle capacity.

== Employers ==
- SUNY Upstate Medical University: 13,000 employees
- Syracuse University: 4,402 employees
- Crouse Hospital: 3,100 employees
- Syracuse Veterans Administration Medical Center: 1,400 employees
- SUNY College of Environmental Science and Forestry: 547 employees

== See also ==
- Archimedes Russell
- Marshall Street, Syracuse
- State University of New York College of Environmental Science and Forestry
- State University of New York Upstate Medical University
- Syracuse University
  - Carrier Dome
- Walnut Park Historic District
- Ward Wellington Ward
