= Sagamore Children's Psychiatric Center =

State psychiatric hospital for children in Dix Hills, New York

- New York State Office of Mental Health
- State seal of New York

Geography
- Location: 197 Half Hollow Road, Dix Hills, New York, United States
- Coordinates: 40.793643°N 73.383822°W

Organization
- Care system: Public
- Type: Psychiatric hospital

Services
- Beds: 54

Links
- Website: Official website
- Lists: Hospitals in New York State

Sagamore Children's Psychiatric Center (SCPC) is a state-operated psychiatric hospital for children and adolescents. Located in Dix Hills, New York, it is operated by the New York State Office of Mental Health (OMH), and provides inpatient, outpatient, and community-based mental health services for youth on Long Island. The center attracted public attention in the 2010s amid statewide proposals to reduce state-operated inpatient capacity and expand community-based services for children's mental health.

== History ==
Sagamore opened in 1969.

In 2013–2014, Sagamore became the subject of public debate after OMH proposed reorganizing state-operated inpatient psychiatric services and shifting resources toward community-based programs. There was local opposition to these plans. In 2014, a state budget agreement kept Sagamore operating for another year while the state evaluated community-based alternatives and potential changes to inpatient capacity.

In 2025, the Dormitory Authority of the State of New York (DASNY) posted bid documents for capital work at the facility, including façade restoration and associated hazardous-materials work for a campus building identified as "Building 80."

== Services ==
Sagamore is an intermediate care inpatient psychiatric facility for children and adolescents, accepting referrals from community hospitals, with length of stay varying by patient needs. The facility also houses ICAN, an inpatient program for youth with autism and other neurodevelopmental disorders.

OMH lists outpatient and community-based services associated with the center, including intensive day treatment programming operated in collaboration with Western Suffolk Boards of Cooperative Educational Services. Program listings include a mobile response/team service associated with Sagamore.

== Education and training ==
The facility provides education services for inpatients and hosts professional training opportunities, including psychology training.

== Notable events ==
In February 2025, an employee of the facility was arraigned on charges including sexual abuse and endangering the welfare of a child, according to court documents. The employee pleaded not guilty.

== See also ==
- New York State Office of Mental Health
- New York State Board for Mental Health Practitioners
