= Capital District Psychiatric Center =

State psychiatric hospital in Albany, New York

- New York State Office of Mental Health

Geography
- Location: 75 New Scotland Avenue, Albany, New York, New York, United States
- Coordinates: 42°39′15″N 73°46′48″W

Organization
- Care system: Public
- Type: Psychiatric

History
- Opened: c. 1972

Links
- Lists: Hospitals in New York State

Capital District Psychiatric Center (CDPC) is a state-operated psychiatric hospital in Albany, New York, United States. It is part of the New York State Office of Mental Health (OMH) and provides inpatient and outpatient services for adults with mental illness in the Capital District region, including inpatient units, outpatient clinics, and a crisis intervention unit.

== History ==
The hospital occupies a site on New Scotland Avenue that previously housed the Bender Laboratory and the Dudley Observatory. The observatory's building was vacated in the late 1960s when the institution moved to a different location; after a 1970 fire, the structure was demolished and Capital District Psychiatric Center was constructed on the former observatory site circa 1972.

In 1975, William DeVita opened a small variety store at CDPC as a not-for-profit corporation employing people with psychiatric disabilities; the project evolved into Rehabilitation Support Services, an organization that provides housing and rehabilitation programs across upstate New York.

In 2025, the New York State Division of the Budget and mental health advocacy organizations highlighted funding for an eight-bed acute care crisis unit and expanded mobile integration services, as well as staffing and infrastructure improvements at the facility. In 2025, Governor Kathy Hochul's office reported that ten additional adult psychiatric beds had been opened at CDPC as part of a broader plan to restore inpatient psychiatric capacity at state-operated facilities.

== Services ==
CDPC provides inpatient psychiatric treatment and rehabilitation for adults diagnosed with persistent mental illness, particularly individuals who have not responded to short-term treatment in general hospital psychiatric units. The facility operates adult inpatient units as well as outpatient services including an Albany outpatient clinic, a child and adolescent outpatient clinic, and community-based crisis services.

CDPC's programs include a crisis intervention unit and crisis inpatient beds, mobile integration teams, and community residential programs such as the New Scotland Residence, which supports individuals transitioning from inpatient care to community living.

As of 2025, the facility hosts 100 beds, 294 annual admissions, and 48 outpatient visits. It has a full-time staff of 244.

The center is located on a medical campus that includes Albany Medical Center, the Albany College of Pharmacy and Health Sciences, Albany Law School, the Stratton Veterans Affairs Medical Center and the OMH central office complex. A neighboring tertiary-care hospital also provides treatment.

== Legal and oversight issues ==
CDPC has been discussed in case law and legal scholarship concerning involuntary commitment, patient rights and seclusion practices. New York appellate decisions such as Christine Q.Q. v. Capital Dist. Psychiatric Center (1985), Matter of Stephen W. (2011) and Matter of Howard U. (2017) have addressed issues including standards for retaining patients for continued inpatient psychiatric care and the evidentiary threshold for involuntary hospitalization. Incidents in 2012 and 2016 prompted concerns about patient seclusion policy and workplace safety.

CDPC appeared in media coverage of criminal cases and the insanity defense. The PBS Frontline documentary A Case of Insanity described the role of CDPC in evaluating and treating Ralph Tortorici, a defendant whose case raised questions about competency, criminal responsibility and the treatment of severe mental illness in the criminal justice system.

== See also ==
- New York State Office of Mental Health
- New York State Office of Addiction Services and Supports
- Office for People With Developmental Disabilities
