= State University Construction Fund =

Public University Corporation

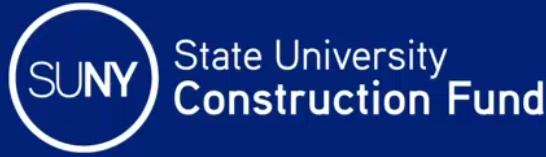

New York State public benefit corporation overview
- Formed: 1962
- Jurisdiction: Provide academic buildings, dormitories and other facilities for the SUNY
- Headquarters: State University Construction Fund 353 Broadway Albany, New York 12246
- New York State public benefit corporation executive: Eric Corngold, Chairman
- Website: www.sucf.suny.edu

The State University Construction Fund is a New York State public-benefit corporation that addresses the construction and capital planning needs of the State University of New York and affiliated institutions.

The mission of the fund is to act as an agent of the university to provide funding for buildings and to help reduce the time between the determination of need and the availability of the completed buildings.

The fund is run by a three-person Board of Trustees. One trustee is selected from the members of the SUNY Board of Trustees, and the other two are nominated by the Governor and confirmed by the State Senate.

SUNY capital program summary
Type	# of buildings	Square feet	Ave age	2008-2013 budget	Source	Projects managed by
Educational facilities	1,823	57.6 million	44.5 years	$4,426 million – Includes $1.65B in future appropriations for critical maintenance projects for 2010/2011 through 2012/2013.	State	Fund/Campus
Hospitals	13	2.5 million	24.3 years	$450 million	Hospital Revenues	Fund/Campus
Residence halls	467	19.3 million	34.0 years	$573 million	Room Rents	DASNY/Campus
Community colleges	490	17.9 million	41.6 years	$436 million	50% State, 50% Local	Local
Totals	2,798	97.3 million	42.1 years	$5,885 million		

== See also ==
- Dormitory Authority of the State of New York
- Empire State Development Corporation
- New York State Environmental Facilities Corporation

== General References ==
- State University Construction Fund Records, 1961-1979. M.E. Grenander Department of Special Collections and Archives, University Libraries, University at Albany, State University of New York (hereafter referred to as the State University Construction Fund Records).
