= Walnut Park Historic District =

Historic district in New York, United States

- U.S. National Register of Historic Places
- U.S. Historic district
- Walnut Park, looking northwest toward Walnut Place

- Location within New York Location within the United States
- Location: Walnut Pl. and Walnut Ave., Syracuse, New York
- Coordinates: 43°2′32″N 76°7′57″W
- Architect: Multiple
- Architectural style: Colonial Revival, Late 19th And 20th Century Revivals, Georgian Revival
- NRHP reference No.: 83001755
- Added to NRHP: September 15, 1983

The Walnut Park Historic District is located in the University Hill neighborhood of Syracuse, New York, adjacent to the Syracuse University campus. The district was added to the National Register of Historic Places in 1983.

== Walnut Park ==
The park was deeded to the city in 1870 by prominent citizen George F. Comstock. Walnut Park is itself a three-block long park. The long sides of the park are bordered on the west by Walnut Place, on the east by Walnut Avenue. Cross streets are Harrison Street, Adams Street, Marshall Street, and Waverly Avenue from north to south. The park was originally landscaped with shade trees, but the Dutch Elm disease wiped out that overall effect in the 1950s. In 1972, new trees were planted. These trees have reached maturity and restored some of the original atmosphere to the park.

== Establishment of the neighborhood ==
The neighborhood surrounding Walnut Park was originally established by some of the social elite of Syracuse. Community leader and banker George Comstock, after donating the property for the park, chose carefully the people to whom he sold building lots.

George H. Bond had the house at 304 Walnut Place built in 1899. He was Onondaga County District Attorney, and founder of the still existent law firm of Bond, Schoeneck and King. The house reflects elements of both the Queen Anne style popular up to that time and the Georgian Revival style becoming popular. The house was later owned by Syracuse University and known as "Blackwell Cottage". It is now the home of Alpha Tau Omega fraternity.

The house at 701 Walnut Place is now owned by Syracuse University and utilized as the Chancellor's residence. It was built for attorney William Nottingham in 1901. The house was designed in the Jacobethan Revival style by architects Brockway and Benson of New York City. Leather lines the library walls. The living room ceiling is decorated with Gothic tracery. The central staircase is carved. A ballroom graces the third floor.

The chateauesque house next door at 703 Walnut Avenue was built for Crucible Steel owner and president Horace Wilkinson in 1905. Gaggin and Gaggin architects of Syracuse designed it. The interior woodworking is various and impressive. Theodore Roosevelt, while engaged in the Barnes-Roosevelt libel case, stayed there as a guest of the family for a month. The house belonged to Phi Delta Theta Fraternity for many years and now belongs to Delta Kappa Epsilon Fraternity, of which American radio and television personality Dick Clark was a member.

Other notable Syracusans who built their homes in the neighborhood included clergyman and archbishop the Reverend Huntington, A. E. Nettleton, of the Nettleton Shoe Company and Paragon Plaster, and the Denison family.

== Fraternity-sorority row ==
In 1915 the Alpha Phi sorority bought the house at 308 Walnut Place. Around 1921 the houses at 208 and 210 Walnut Place and the one at 901 Walnut Avenue all became sorority or fraternity houses. In 1923 house at 300 Walnut Place was sold to the Delta Delta Delta sorority. The house at 310 Walnut Place was built around 1925 for the Sigma Phi Epsilon fraternity and the house at 803 Walnut Avenue was built for Gamma Phi Beta sorority. In 1928, Kappa Alpha Theta sorority had local architect Marjorie Wright design their Tudor style house at 306 Walnut Place. In 1937 the house at 907 Walnut Avenue also became the Kappa Delta sorority house. Over the following decades, more fraternities and sororities moved in, making the area the Fraternity/Sorority Row of Syracuse University.

== Block party ==
Walnut Park was the traditional home of Syracuse University's "block party", an event celebrating the coming of spring with live entertainment in an outdoor setting. In 1993, amid concerns of over-crowding and excessive drinking, the University moved the event to a more readily controllable indoor venue.

== Walnut Park Historic District contributing properties ==
	Landmark name	Image	Date Built	Style	Location	Description
1	Syracuse University; "Cultural Center"		c. 1900	Georgian Revival	104 Walnut Place	2.5 stories; tan brick; shingled dormer; hip roof; interior lion's head molding; oak woodwork; now a vacant lot
2	Syracuse University; "Counseling Center"		c. 1900	Georgian Revival	200 Walnut Place	2.5 stories; clapboard siding; three dormers; steep hip roof; interior oak woodwork; fraternity since 1970; at time of listing known as Kappa Phi Delta fraternity
3	Sigma Alpha Epsilon fraternity		c. 1900	Georgian Revival	206 Walnut Place	2.5 stories; brick; open porch; Doric columns; dormer; hip roof; at listing known as Syracuse University: "Erie Cottage"
4	Alpha Epsilon Pi fraternity		c. 1900	Colonial Revival	208 Walnut Place	2.5 stories; steep hip roof; Keck stained glass; renovated c. 1930; at listing known as Beta Theta Pi fraternity
5	Phi Delta Theta fraternity		c. 1897	Georgian Revival	210 Walnut Place	2.5 stories; brick; hip roof; renovated c. 1920; originally residence of Bishop Huntington. Had been Pi Beta Phi chapter house.
6	Delta Delta Delta sorority		1903		300 Walnut Place	3 stories; tan brick; low hip roof; originally Denison family house
7	Alpha Tau Omega fraternity		1899	Queen Anne/Georgian Revival	304 Walnut Place	2.5 stories; clapboard and shingle; gable roof; originally George Bond residence; at listing known as Syracuse University: "Blackwell Cottage"
8	Kappa Alpha Theta sorority		1928	Tudor Revival	306 Walnut Place	2.5 stories; brick and stucco; gable roof; designed by Marjorie Wright
9	Alpha Phi sorority		1898	Colonial Revival	308 Walnut Place	3 stories; brick and shingle; Flemish gable roof; stained glass windows; designed by J&R Lamb
10	Syracuse University: "Slutzker Center for International Services"		c. 1925	Georgian Revival	310 Walnut Place	2.5 stories; Flemish bond brick; originally Sigma Phi Epsilon fraternity house; at listing known as "Student Government Building"
11	Syracuse University: "Chancellor's Residence"		1901	Jacobethan Revival	701 Walnut Avenue	2.5 stories; brick and stone; interior Gothic tracery ceiling and leather lined library walls
12	Delta Kappa Epsilon fraternity		1903	Chateauesque	703 Walnut Avenue	3 stories; stone; steep gable roof; parapet; battlements; turret; porte-cochere; originally belonged to Horace Wilkinson; residence of Phi Delta Theta fraternity until early 1992; at listing known as Delta Kappa Epsilon fraternity
13	Delta Phi Epsilon sorority		1905		705 Walnut Avenue	2 stories; tan brick; red hip roof; stained glass windows; porte-cochere; originally owned by A.E. Nettleton
14	Delta Tau Delta fraternity		c. 1915	Second Empire	801 Walnut Avenue	2 stories; tan brick
15	Gamma Phi Beta sorority		c. 1930	Colonial Revival	803 Walnut Avenue	2.5 stories; Flemish bond brick
16	Delta Gamma sorority		1907	Tudor Revival	901 Walnut Avenue	2.5 stories; gable roof
17	Tau Epsilon Phi fraternity		1900	Tudor Revival	907 Walnut Avenue	2.5 stories; shingled siding; turret; gable roof

== See also ==
- National Register of Historic Places listings in Syracuse, New York
- Sherbrook Apartments (Syracuse, New York)
- Ward Wellington Ward
