= Elmira Psychiatric Center =

State psychiatric hospital in Elmira, New York

- New York State Office of Mental Health
- Seal of New York

Geography
- Location: 100 Washington Street, Elmira, New York, United States
- Coordinates: 42°5′32″N 76°47′40″W

Organization
- Care system: Public
- Type: Specialist
- Specialty: Psychiatry

History
- Opened: 1972

Links
- Website: omh.ny.gov/omhweb/facilities/elpc/index.htm
- Lists: Hospitals in New York State

Elmira Psychiatric Center (EPC) is a state psychiatric hospital in Elmira, New York, operated by the New York State Office of Mental Health (OMH). The facility provides inpatient care and community-based psychiatric services in New York's Southern Tier and Finger Lakes regions.

== History ==
The center was developed as part of New York State's late-1960s and early-1970s mental-health capital construction program. It was affected by major flooding in the Elmira area during Hurricane Agnes in late June 1972, shortly after the facility opened.

In the early 2000s, New York State considered a consolidation plan under which EPC's inpatient services would be consolidated with Rochester Psychiatric Center and the facility would close on July 1, 2003, with services planned to continue elsewhere in the state system. This was met with public opposition. In 2013, Governor Andrew Cuomo reversed that decision

Also in 2013, OMH announced a statewide reorganization plan to shift its public inpatient system toward a network of Regional Centers of Excellence with associated community service hubs. In 2014, EPC was listed as a community service hub within the Great Lakes region network and was included in systemwide inpatient capacity tables for children's services.

In a 2010 report on restraints of children and young adults, released by the New York Office of Mental Health, the rate was .35 per 1,000 patient hours, or approximately 4.5 hours per month -- the highest in New York State.

== Campus and facilities ==
The campus comprises nine buildings. The facility's inpatient section can accommodate 52 adults and 12 adolescents at once, and they also offer treatments on an outpatient basis. In 2024, Governor Kathy Hochul announced an award of $5 million for a psychiatric emergency program.

=== Cornell University digital collection ===
Architectural photographs and models for the center, dated 1970, are preserved in Cornell University Library's John Clair Miller digital collection. Items depict a multi-building campus that included an Administration/Education building, a dining hall and shared common space, and multiple dwelling units organized with exterior courts and terraces. A representative interior view from the collection identifies the complex as a contemporary American psychiatric-hospital/extended-care facility.

== Services ==
OMH describes EPC as providing inpatient treatment on its Elmira campus for children, adolescents, and adults, as well as community-based psychiatric services across the Southern Tier and Finger Lakes regions. OMH's facility profile lists community-based programs that include Assertive Community Treatment; clinic treatment; community residences; school-based day treatment; drop-in centers; family care residences; intensive case management; and mobile mental health.

OMH's EPC service matrix indicates that EPC-affiliated inpatient and outpatient services are delivered across multiple counties, with program locations that include Elmira, Horseheads, Wellsville, Geneva, Rushville, Shortsville, Watkins Glen, Seneca Falls, Bath, Waverly, Ithaca, Lansing, and Penn Yan.

=== Admissions and access ===
Inpatient admissions are generally made via transfer from an acute-care hospital or through county mental health directors. Access to community-based services typically occurs through county Single Point of Entry processes.

=== Child & adolescent crisis respite ===
A Child and Adolescent Crisis Respite House operates as an eight-bed, short-term, voluntary program to help stabilize crises and support families in maintaining youth in their current residence. The service if intended for youth ages 10–17, with stays of up to two weeks, and may include crisis stabilization, behavioral support, medication education/training, family and peer support, and parenting education.

=== Mobile integration team services ===
OMH's statewide planning documents identify the Southern Tier Mobile Integration Team (MIT) as operating through Elmira, providing community-based interventions such as outreach, engagement, skill-building, peer support, crisis services, and referral. MIT is designed to provide clinical intervention and support for adults with serious mental illness and youth with serious emotional disturbances, including services such as brief therapeutic support, crisis assessment and intervention, and family and caregiver support.

== See also ==
- New York State Office of Mental Health
- List of hospitals in New York (state)
- New York State Department of Health
- New York State Board for Mental Health Practitioners
