= Rockland Children's Psychiatric Center =

State psychiatric hospital for children and adolescents in Orangeburg, New York

- New York State Office of Mental Health
- State seal of New York

Geography
- Location: 2 First Avenue, Orangeburg, New York, United States
- Coordinates: 41°2′48″N 73°58′9″W

Organization
- Care system: Public
- Type: Psychiatric hospital

Services
- Beds: 54

Links
- Lists: Hospitals in New York State

Rockland Children's Psychiatric Center (RCPC) is a state-operated psychiatric hospital for children and adolescents in Orangeburg, New York, operated by the New York State Office of Mental Health (OMH). It provides inpatient psychiatric care and a range of outpatient and community-based programs.

== Services ==
RCPC offers inpatient psychiatric treatment for youth ages 11–18 and an outpatient clinic, day treatment, intensive day treatment, and intensive case management services for ages 5–18. It offers an intensive, short-term, family-based inpatient psychiatric treatment program.

=== Facilities ===
The current inpatient facility is an acute psychiatric care facility completed in 2009, with a project size of 52,000 square feet and a project cost of $19 million. Counties served include Rockland, Westchester, Orange, Sullivan, Putnam, Dutchess and Ulster.

=== Capacity and staffing ===
As of 2025, the facility has 54 beds and 111 full-time personnel. Reported annual admissions are 1,587.

=== Former site ===
In 2011, local officials in the Town of Orangetown sought state authorization to purchase the former Rockland Children's Psychiatric Center property for redevelopment and economic development purposes.

== History ==
=== Proposed closure and conversion debate (2021) ===
In 2021, Governor Andrew Cuomo's proposed state budget included a plan to convert RCPC from a state-operated psychiatric center to a not-for-profit-operated model providing brief, intensive, community-based care. The proposal was described in the state fiscal reporting on the executive budget, threatening closure. Labor unions and elected officials publicly opposed the plan.

A bipartisan group of state legislators and news commentators also urged the state to keep RCPC open. In testimony submitted during the FY2021–2022 budget hearings, the Civil Service Employees Association (CSEA) stated that the executive budget proposed closing RCPC and argued that closure would reduce access to inpatient youth psychiatric services in the lower Hudson Valley.

=== 2025 inpatient bed expansion ===
In April 2025, Governor Kathy Hochul announced that New York had opened 125 additional psychiatric beds at state-operated facilities, including at RCPC.

== See also ==
- Rockland Psychiatric Center
- New York State Office of Mental Health
- Child and adolescent psychiatry
