= New York State Office of Mental Health =

State agency in New York, United States

- Seal of New York

Agency overview
- Type: State agency
- Jurisdiction: New York state government
- Headquarters: 44 Holland Avenue, Albany, New York
- Agency executive: Ann Marie T. Sullivan, Commissioner
- Parent department: New York State Department of Mental Hygiene
- Website: omh.ny.gov

The Office of Mental Health (OMH) is an agency of the New York state government responsible for assuring the development of comprehensive plans, programs, and services in the areas of research, prevention, and care, treatment, rehabilitation, education, and training of the mentally ill. It is part of the pro forma Department of Mental Hygiene along with the Office of Addiction Services and Supports (OASAS) and Office for People With Developmental Disabilities (OPWDD).

== Public mental health system ==
The majority of the public mental health system is in voluntary outpatient programs, the largest and most used being clinic treatment services. Inpatient care is provided mainly by homeless shelters, supplemented by the general hospital network, jails, and state psychiatric centers. 45–57% of New York mental health consumers use Medicaid, which is the largest single source of funding.

== Comprehensive psychiatric emergency programs (CPEPs) ==
More psychiatric emergencies are being pushed into emergency departments where many patients are "boarded" (held after a decision to admit/transfer) for hours to days. Comprehensive psychiatric emergency programs (CPEPs) are meant to provide a single entry point for psychiatric emergencies, including crisis intervention in an emergency room setting, mobile crisis outreach, crisis residence beds, extended observation beds (up to 72 hours), and triage/referral.

== Inpatient services ==
As of February 2025, OMH reported 9,251 inpatient psychiatric beds statewide—including 4,902 beds in general hospitals—amid a ~10.5% decline in total capacity since 2014.

== Facility regulation ==
OMH regulates and licenses private mental health services, such private psychiatric centers, clinics, and treatment facilities, including those in hospitals and schools. OMH also regulates residential treatment facilities for children and youth operated by nonprofit corporations. Programs include inpatient, outpatient, partial hospitalization, day care, emergency, and rehabilitative treatments and services.

All mental health clinics must obtain an operating certificate from OMH to legally operate. OMH uses a certificate of need (CON) process for prior review of proposed programs, and inspects and certifies existing programs on a regular basis.

== Public safety ==
The agency employs Peace officers to maintain order and protect patients, grounds, and buildings.. NYS office of Mental Health officers have peace officer authority when on duty pursuant to New York State Criminal Procedure Law § 2.10 (52). OMH Peace Officers Do not carry firearms. All applicants must attend a training program within five weeks of hire covering penal law, vehicle and traffic law, fire prevention, basic criminal law, first aid and CPR, investigations, proper use of restraints, and other required training.

The New York State Incident Management and Reporting System (NIMRS) is used by providers for reportable incidents, and the Justice Center for the Protection of People with Special Needs has the responsibility to track, prevent, investigate, and prosecute reports of abuse and neglect of vulnerable persons.

== Financing ==
New York excludes most inpatient psychiatric hospital services from Medicaid managed care plan coverage, with coverage instead directed to community and ambulatory programs such as ACT, MHOTRS, CPEP (with limited observation beds), CDT, Partial Hospitalization, PROS, and crisis services. New York could, but does not, because the United States will not pay for it. Care coverage extends only to token short-term substitutes like CPEP extended observation beds, capped at 72 hours, and to outpatient or partial services.

== Workforce development ==
Many essential workers are still earning far below a living wage even after the COVID-19 pandemic. OMH provides funding for eligible workforce development initiatives of licensed providers. Funding comes from federal Community Mental Health Services Block Grants and the enhanced Federal Medical Assistance Percentages program, more recently from e.g. the CRRSAA and American Rescue Plan Act of 2021 (COVID-19 stimuli packages), for targeted rate increases and recruitment and retention funds. The state FY 2024 budget also included funding for cost-of-living adjustments and expanded loan forgiveness for social workers and technicians. The NYS Department of Labor oversees the operation of local WIOA career centers (one-stop centers, American job centers) that offer a range of employment and training services, including job search assistance, career counseling, and access to job training programs.

== Health information ==
The Statewide Health Information Network for New York (SHIN-NY, pronounced "shiny") is a health information exchange that allows healthcare providers to access and share patient data, including several regional health information organizations such as Hixny.

The Psychiatric Services and Clinical Knowledge Enhancement System (PSYCKES) is a HIPAA-compliant web application for using Medicaid claims and health data to support clinical decision making, care coordination, and quality improvement.

== Administration ==
The Behavioral Health Services Advisory Council (BHSAC) advises OMH by reviewing, monitoring, and evaluating the adequacy and delivery of services.

In the State Legislature, the Senate Mental Health and Assembly Mental Health standing committees conduct legislative oversight, budget advocacy, and otherwise report bills on the services, care, treatment, and advocacy for individuals with various disabilities, while the Senate Health and Assembly Health standing committees focus on healthcare facilities operations and services delivery more generally.

In the State Judiciary, the Mental Hygiene Legal Service (MHLS) provides legal representation, advice, and assistance to mentally disabled persons under the care or jurisdiction of state-operated or licensed facilities concerning their admission, retention, care, or treatment.

== History ==
In 1836–1843 the Utica State Hospital was established, and in 1865–1869 the Willard State Hospital was established to relieve Utica of the incurably insane and relieve the almshouses of mentally ill paupers. Throughout the late 18th and most of the 19th centuries, families and county almshouses provided care to the mentally disabled, but in 1890 the State Care Act made the state responsible for the pauper insane. In 1909 the Insanity Law was consolidated in chapter 27 of the Consolidated Laws of New York.

The Department of Mental Hygiene was established in 1926–1927 as part of a restructuring of the New York state government, and was given responsibility for people diagnosed with mental retardation, mental illness or epilepsy. Dr. Frederick W. Parsons was appointed the first department commissioner in January, 1927. He was replaced by Dr. William J. Tiffany in 1937, who then resigned in 1943 over an investigation into handling of an outbreak of amoebic dysentery at Creedmoor State Hospital. By 1950, the department had grown into the largest agency of the New York state government, with more than 24,000 employees and an operating cost exceeding a third of the state budget. The state acceded to the Interstate Compact on Mental Health in 1956. In 1964 the law on involuntary commitment was amended with the express purpose of increasing patients' rights. In 1972 the Mental Hygiene Law was revised and reenacted.

In 1977–1978, the Department of Mental Hygiene was reorganized into the autonomous Office of Mental Health (OMH), Office of Alcoholism and Substance Abuse, and the Office of Mental Retardation and Developmental Disabilities. The three commissioners serve on a council that performs inter-office coordination. In 1989, comprehensive psychiatric emergency programs (CPEPs), hospital-based crisis centers with observation beds, outreach, and referral services, were authorized to relieve overcrowded emergency departments. In 2012, the Protection of People with Special Needs Act (PPSNA) established the Justice Center for the Protection of People with Special Needs to create uniform safeguards for people with special needs served in residential facilities and day programs by provider agencies that are operated, licensed, or certified by a multitude of state agencies, including the OMH, OASAS, and OPWDD.

== List of hospitals ==
The public hospitals in the department are listed below, though there are many other private facilities; the New York State Psychiatric Institute and Nathan Kline Institute for Psychiatric Research are medical research institutes.

Hospital	County	Region
Greater Binghamton Health Center	Broome	Southern Tier
Bronx Psychiatric Center	Bronx	New York City
Buffalo Psychiatric Center	Erie	Western New York
Capital District Psychiatric Center	Albany	Capital District
Central New York Psychiatric Center	Oneida	Statewide
Creedmoor Psychiatric Center	Queens	New York City
Elmira Psychiatric Center	Chemung	Southern Tier
Kingsboro Psychiatric Center	Kings	New York City
Kirby Forensic Psychiatric Center	New York	New York City
Manhattan Psychiatric Center	New York	New York City
Mid-Hudson Forensic Psychiatric Center	Orange	Statewide
Mohawk Valley Psychiatric Center	Oneida	Mohawk Valley
Nathan S. Kline Institute for Psychiatric Research	Rockland	Hudson Valley
New York State Psychiatric Institute	New York	New York City
Pilgrim Psychiatric Center	Suffolk	Long Island
Richard H. Hutchings Psychiatric Center	Onondaga	Central New York
Rochester Psychiatric Center	Monroe	Finger Lakes
Rockland Psychiatric Center	Rockland	Hudson Valley
St. Lawrence Psychiatric Center	St. Lawrence	North Country
South Beach Psychiatric Center	Richmond	New York City
New York City Children's Center	Multiple Locations	New York City
Rockland Children's Psychiatric Center	Rockland	Hudson Valley
Sagamore Children's Psychiatric Center	Suffolk	Long Island
Western New York Children's Psychiatric Center	Erie	Western New York

== List of commissioners ==
DMH

- 1927–1937, Frederick W. Parsons
- 1937–1943, William J. Tiffany
- 1943–1950, Frederick MacCurdy
- 1950–1954, Newton Bigelow
- 1955–1964, Paul H. Hoch
- 1966–1974, Alan D. Miller
- 1975–1978, Lawrence C. Kolb

OMH

- 1978, James A. Prevost
- 1983, Stephen Katz
- 1988, Richard C. Surles
- 1995, James Stone
- 2007, Michael Hogan
- 2014, Ann Marie T. Sullivan

== See also ==
- New York State Department of Health
- New York City Department of Health and Mental Hygiene
- New York State Board for Mental Health Practitioners
