= Lawrence Kolb =

American psychiatrist (1911–2006)

Lawrence Coleman Kolb
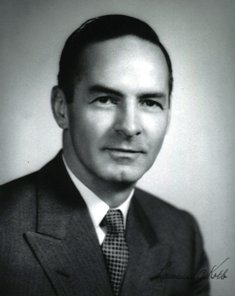

Commissioner of the New York State Department of Mental Hygiene
- In office 1975–1978
- Preceded by: Alan D. Miller
- Succeeded by: James A. Prevost

Personal details
- Born: June 16, 1911 Baltimore, Maryland
- Died: October 20, 2006 (aged 95) Orlando, Florida
- Education: Trinity College, Dublin; Johns Hopkins University

Lawrence Coleman Kolb (June 16, 1911 – October 20, 2006) was an American psychiatrist who was the New York State Commissioner of Mental Hygiene from 1975 to 1978.

== Biography ==
He was born in on June 16, 1911, in Baltimore, Maryland. His family moved to Ireland from 1928 to 1931, and he attended Trinity College in Dublin. He returned to the United States to attend medical school at Johns Hopkins University in Baltimore. Following graduation, he did residency training in psychiatry and neurology, then considered one specialty, at Strong Memorial Hospital in Rochester, New York. During World War II, he went into the Navy and was stationed aboard hospital ships and then put in charge of a clinic for "battle fatigue" in Portsmouth, New Hampshire. After the Navy, Kolb worked at the National Institute of Mental Health in Bethesda, Maryland (where a collection of his papers are held) and the Mayo Clinic in Rochester, Minnesota.

In 1954 Kolb was appointed chairman of the Department of Psychiatry at Columbia University Medical Center and director of the New York State Psychiatric Institute. Kolb oversaw numerous clinical and research advances during his 21-year tenure, the longest of any director. In 1975 Kolb left his posts at Columbia to become the New York State Commissioner of Mental Hygiene and correct abuses in the state system of mental health.

He died on October 20, 2006, in Orlando, Florida.

== Legacy ==
Kolb was strongly committed to research in psychiatry. Early in his career he did a seminal study of phantom limb pain (see the reference below). Many years later he led a significant study on "battle fatigue" in Vietnam veterans, finding that post-traumatic stress disorder could cause physical signs and symptoms. The research facility at New York State Psychiatric Institute is called the Lawrence C. Kolb Research Building.

His father, Lawrence Kolb (1881–1972), was also an eminent psychiatrist. Kolb Sr. pioneered the medical approach to narcotics addiction treatment and advocated treating drug addicts as patients, not criminals.

== Works ==
- Kolb, Lawrence C. The Painful Phantom: Psychology, Physiology and Treatment. Springfield, IL: Thomas, 1954.
- Kolb, Lawrence C., ed. [et al.]. Schizophrenia. Boston: Little, Brown, 1964.
- Kolb, Lawrence C., Viola W. Bernard, and Bruce P. Dohrenwend. Urban Challenges to Psychiatry: the Case History of a Response, by 14 Authors. Boston: Little, Brown, 1969.
- Kolb, Lawrence C. Modern Clinical Psychiatry. Philadelphia: Saunders, 1977.
- Kolb, Lawrence C. and Leon Roizin. The First Psychiatric Institute: How Research and Education Changed Practice. Washington, DC: American Psychiatric Press, 1993.
- Kolb, Lawrence C. co-written with Javad Nurbakhsh; and Hamideh Jahangiri; Handbook of Psychiatry Volume 18 ISBN 978-3-330-34295-8, at The Lap Lambert Academic Publishing, Germany, 2019.
