= Marshall Street, Syracuse =

Street in Syracuse, New York

- Louis Marshall Way
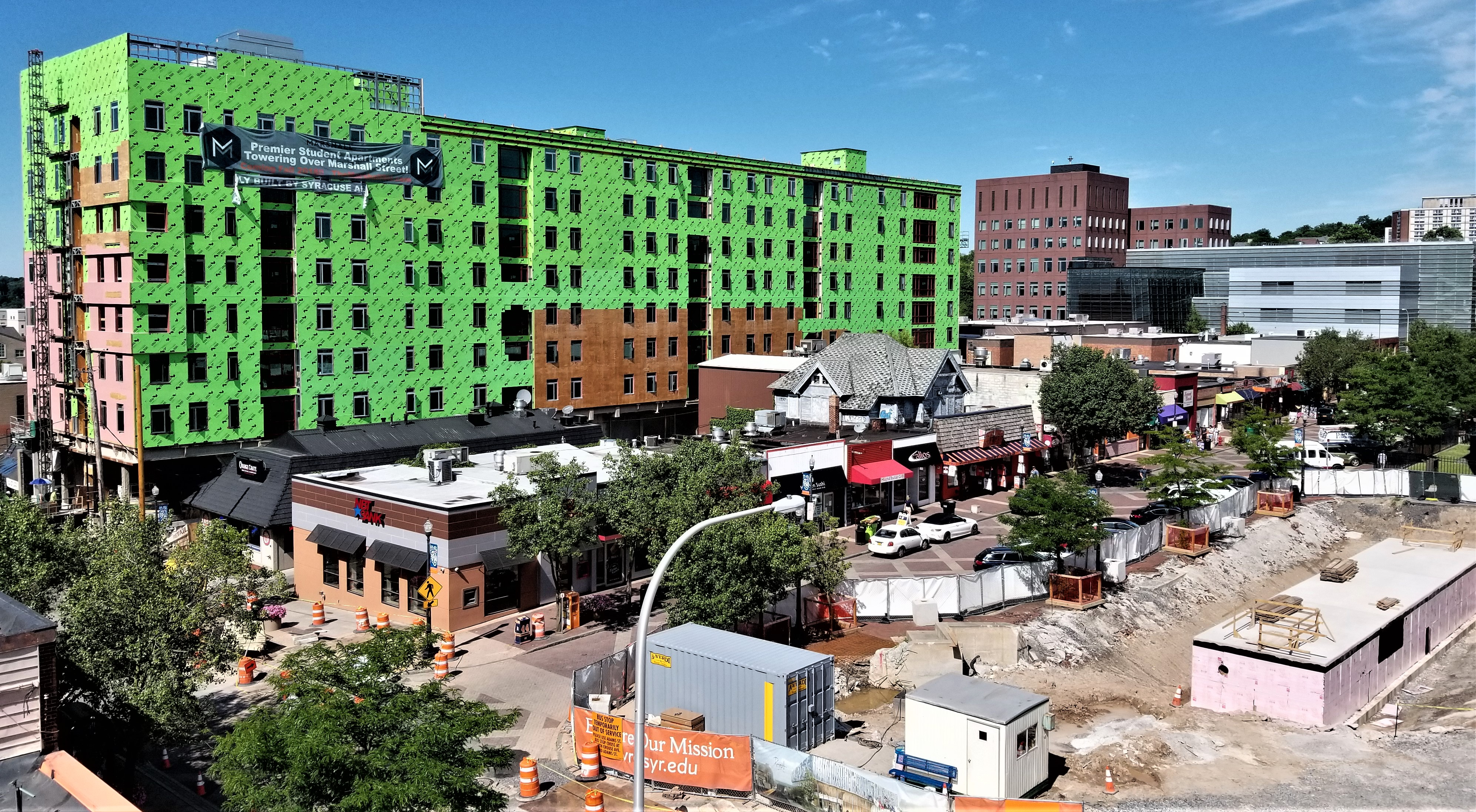
- 100 block of Marshall Street seen from the southwest (July 2018)
- Interactive map of Marshall Street, Syracuse
- Postal code: 13210
- Coordinates: 43.0416°N 76.1356°W
- east end: Ostrom Avenue
- west end: Crouse Avenue

Marshall Street, or "M" Street, is a street in the University Hill neighborhood in Syracuse, New York, adjacent to Syracuse University. Marshall Street often refer to the commercial area including and surrounding the 100 Block of Marshall Street. This area primarily functions as an off-campus commercial area for college students.

== History ==
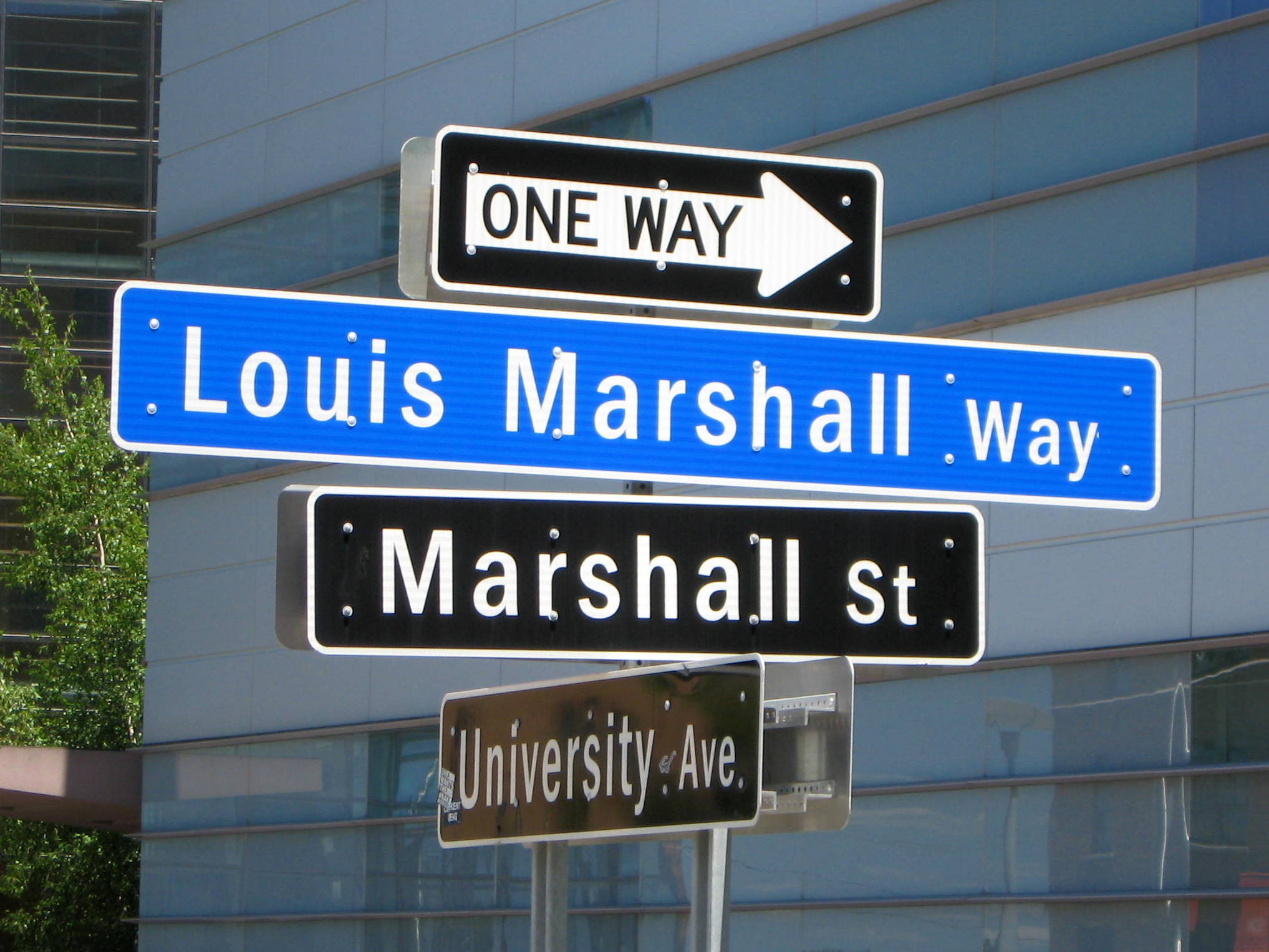

Marshall Street is believed to be named for Louis Marshall (1856–1929), a Syracuse native, corporate and constitutional lawyer, and Trustee of Syracuse University, who helped reestablish the New York State College of Forestry (now SUNY-ESF) at Syracuse University. The 100 block of Marshall Street received the honorary name Louis Marshall Way in 2006. Historians are unsure if the street originally honored Louis Marshall, who only reached prominence after the turn of the twentieth century. The Marshall Square Mall is also located adjacent to Marshall Street. The area is promoted by the Crouse-Marshall Business Association. Marshall Street has been renovated many times over the years.

== See also ==
- University Hill, Syracuse
