= New York City Children's Center =

State psychiatric hospital for children in New York City

- New York State Office of Mental Health
- State seal of New York

Geography
- Location: Multiple campuses in New York City, New York City, New York, United States

Organization
- Care system: Public
- Type: Psychiatric hospital

Links
- Website: omh.ny.gov/omhweb/facilities/nyccc/
- Lists: Hospitals in New York State

New York City Children's Center (NYCCC) is a state-operated psychiatric hospital for children and adolescents in New York City, operated by the New York State Office of Mental Health (OMH). It provides inpatient and outpatient mental and behavioral health services through multiple campuses in the city. It has a fixed 184-bed capacity and a budgeted capacity for 92 beds as of 2025.

== History ==
=== Queens campus ===
The center's Queens campus traces its origins to the opening of the Queens Children's Hospital in February 1970; it was renamed the Queens Children's Psychiatric Center in 1975.

In the early 2000s, proposals to relocate the Queens Children's Psychiatric Center to the Creedmoor Psychiatric Center campus drew local opposition; a 2002 report stated the relocation would not be included in the state budget and the facility would remain at its existing site.

=== Bronx campus ===
NYCCC's Bronx campus was established at the Bronx Behavioral Health Campus in an OMH facility complex that included a children's psychiatric center. In 2016, it had a capacity for 86 beds.

In 2022, there were statewide reductions in children's state-hospital psychiatric beds under New York's OMH "Transformation Plan," with the most significant reduction occurring at NYCCC in 2021.

In 2025, Governor Kathy Hochul's office announced the opening of a state-funded 21-bed inpatient psychiatric facility for youth at the NYCCC Bronx campus, operated by Montefiore Medical Center.

=== Brooklyn campus ===
The Brooklyn campus is on the site of the former Brooklyn Children's Psychiatric Center, which was reconfigured into the Brooklyn Children's Center as part of a shift away from what was underutilized inpatient capacity toward expanded community-based services for children and families in Kings County.

=== Consolidation ===
Under Chapter 56 of the Laws of 2012 there was a consolidation of the Bronx Children's Psychiatric Center, the Queens Children's Psychiatric Center, and the Brooklyn Children's Center into a single entity -- the New York City Children's Psychiatric Center/New York City Children's Center.

== See also ==
- New York State Office of Mental Health
- Creedmoor Psychiatric Center
- Child and adolescent psychiatry
