= Bronx Psychiatric Center =

State psychiatric hospital in the Bronx, New York

- New York State Office of Mental Health

Geography
- Location: 1500 Waters Place, Bronx, New York, United States
- Coordinates: 40°50′48″N 73°50′24″W

Organization
- Care system: Public
- Type: Psychiatric

Services
- Beds: 156

History
- Opened: 1963

Links
- Website: omh.ny.gov/omhweb/facilities/brpc/
- Lists: Hospitals in New York State

Bronx Psychiatric Center (BPC) is a state-operated psychiatric hospital in the Morris Park neighborhood of the Bronx, New York City. It is part of the New York State Office of Mental Health (OMH) system and provides inpatient, outpatient and residential psychiatric services, primarily for adults with serious mental illness in Bronx County and the surrounding region.

The center is located on the Bronx Behavioral Health Campus, a 436,000-square-foot complex that opened in 2015–2016 and includes a 156-bed adult psychiatric hospital, the 86-bed New York City Children's Center – Bronx Campus, and a 188-bed residential village providing transitional and supportive housing.

== History ==
Bronx Psychiatric Center opened in 1963 as a state mental health facility in the northeast Bronx. For decades, its main multi-story building functioned as a roughly 360-bed inpatient hospital operated by OMH. A 2010 report by the nonprofit news outlet City Limits described the facility at that time as a 360-bed state hospital whose staff were protesting proposed layoffs.

In the late 2000s, New York State began a major redevelopment of the campus. The Dormitory Authority of the State of New York (DASNY) managed construction of a new integrated behavioral health campus on the existing site, with work beginning in 2008 and substantial completion in 2015. The new campus was officially opened on January 19, 2016, attended by state officials, community representatives and hospital leadership. The project replaced the original 1960s-era Bronx Psychiatric Center building and modernized facilities for both adult and child mental health services.

== Facilities and services ==
OMH operates Bronx Psychiatric Center as a public psychiatric hospital. The adult inpatient component of the Bronx Behavioral Health Campus is licensed for 156 beds and provides acute and longer-term treatment for adults with serious mental illness. The campus also houses the New York City Children's Center – Bronx Campus, with 86 inpatient beds for children and adolescents, and a 188-bed residential village that offers crisis, transitional and supported housing for individuals with behavioral health conditions.

According to OMH, BPC operates a continuum of services that includes inpatient hospitalization, outpatient clinics and community-based programs aimed at helping individuals transition back to community living. A Bronx reentry and resource directory has described the center as a comprehensive facility with multiple inpatient services and a broad outpatient program.

The campus occupies roughly 85 acres near the Hutchinson River Parkway and Hutchinson Metro Center. The new buildings were designed to incorporate natural light, outdoor courtyards and landscaped areas intended to support recovery and reduce institutional feel. Architectural coverage has noted features such as decentralized nursing stations, improved sightlines for staff, and energy-efficient systems. The facility was designed to reduce energy consumption by about 21 percent compared with the older hospital and to meet LEED Silver sustainability standards.

== Education and training ==
Bronx Psychiatric Center is a training site for clinical psychology and other mental health disciplines. OMH sponsors an APA-accredited psychology doctoral internship program whose adult inpatient, outpatient and residential rotations are based at BPC, and the facility also offers doctoral externship placements. The center has also been cited as an affiliated teaching site for psychiatry and psychology trainees in accounts of mental health care in New York City.

== Campus redevelopment and planning ==
In 2019, the public development authority Empire State Development (ESD) adopted a general project plan for the "Bronx Psychiatric Center Land Use Improvement and Civic Project," covering roughly 34 acres of the state-owned site. The plan envisioned demolishing obsolete structures and replacing them with new office, laboratory, residential and community facilities connected to the adjacent Hutchinson Metro Center and a planned Metro-North Railroad station at Morris Park. According to ESD, new roads, sidewalks, and bike and pedestrian paths are intended to integrate the campus more closely with the surrounding neighborhood while maintaining the hospital core.

In 2023, Governor Kathy Hochul announced additional state funding for 150 new state hospital beds across several OMH facilities, including Bronx Psychiatric Center, as part of a multi-year plan to expand inpatient capacity for people with serious mental illness and reduce homelessness.

== Wellness Center ==
In 2025, OMH announced the opening of a renovated 17,000-square-foot community wellness center on the Bronx Psychiatric Center campus. The space includes group rooms, a teaching kitchen and areas for creative and recreational activities. It is intended as a resource for both people receiving services on campus and community members seeking support.

OMH subsequently solicited proposals from nonprofit organizations to operate the Bronx Psychiatric Center Wellness Center, with the expectation that the operator would offer peer-led groups, recovery-oriented programming, and linkages to housing, employment, and other social supports.

== Oversight and regulation ==
Bronx Psychiatric Center is subject to financial and operational oversight by state agencies. A 1998 audit by the Office of the New York State Comptroller of the center’s handling of patient funds found "serious deficiencies in internal controls over cash" in the cashier’s office and recommended improvements to safeguard patient assets and ensure that receipts and disbursements were properly recorded.

The campus has also been the subject of environmental regulation and remediation by the New York State Department of Environmental Conservation (DEC). In 2019, DEC issued a Record of Decision for the Bronx Psychiatric Center site, classifying it as a Class 2 inactive hazardous waste disposal site under the State Superfund Program and selecting a remedial program to address contamination associated with transformer oil and other hazardous substances.

In December 2021, the Office of Mental Health and Bronx Psychiatric Center issued a public notice of a breach of protected health information after audit records relating to BPC patients were stolen from OMH’s central offices in Albany. The notice stated that the records contained patient names, identification numbers, cash account balances, residence and status information, and admission and discharge dates, and advised potentially affected individuals on steps to monitor for identity theft and fraud.

== Public health and safety incidents ==
=== Legionnaires' disease cluster ===
In 2015, a small cluster of Legionnaires' disease cases in the East Bronx was traced by the New York City Department of Health and Mental Hygiene to a cooling tower at Bronx Psychiatric Center. News reports and a subsequent industry analysis noted that one person died and several others were sickened, and that the facility cooperated with authorities, disinfected the cooling tower and passed follow-up testing. Media coverage linked the case to broader efforts by the city to regulate and inspect cooling towers after a larger outbreak in the South Bronx earlier that year.

=== Violence, deaths and missing persons ===
In 2014, one patient was charged with second-degree murder following the death of another patient inside a ward at the facility. In 2023, a woman's death at the center was investigated as a homicide.

More broadly, reporters and commentators have used Bronx Psychiatric Center as a case study in discussions of long-term institutional care and gaps in the mental health system for New Yorkers with serious mental illness.

== See also ==
- New York State Office of Mental Health
- List of hospitals in New York City
