= Rochester Psychiatric Center =

State psychiatric hospital in Rochester, New York

- New York State Office of Mental Health
- State seal of New York

Geography
- Location: 1111 Elmwood Avenue, Rochester, New York, United States
- Coordinates: 43°7′23″N 77°36′37″W

Organization
- Care system: Public
- Type: Psychiatric

Services
- Beds: 229 (April 2025 budgeted capacity; 87 adult + 142 forensic)

History
- Opened: 1857 (as Monroe County Insane Asylum; state-run since 1891)

Links
- Website: omh.ny.gov/omhweb/facilities/ropc/
- Lists: Hospitals in New York State

Rochester Psychiatric Center (RPC) is a state psychiatric hospital in Rochester, New York, operated by the New York State Office of Mental Health (OMC). It provides inpatient psychiatric treatment for adults, including forensic psychiatric services, and operates outpatient and community-based mental health programs serving multiple counties in the Greater Rochester region.

== History ==
In 1857, Monroe County added a wing to its Alms House for the care of people with mental illness; the addition was known as the Monroe County Insane Asylum. New York State assumed operation of the county institution on July 1, 1891, and it became the Rochester State Hospital as part of the state's network of psychiatric hospitals.

In 2013, OMH's statewide consolidation plan projected that RPC would be transformed into a "Regional Forensic Center of Excellence" and that its adult inpatient services would be reorganized as part of a larger regional center with facilities in Buffalo and Syracuse.

== Services ==
RPC provides specialized inpatient treatment for adults through its Adult Services Unit and offers inpatient forensic psychiatric treatment through the Rochester Regional Forensic Unit. The center also operates outpatient and community programs, including children and youth services, community residences, and early psychosis services (OnTrackNY).

Service area includes Monroe, Genesee, Livingston, Orleans, Wayne, and Wyoming counties.

== Facilities and capacity ==
RPC's budgeted inpatient capacity is 87 adult beds and 142 forensic beds.

State capital improvement projects administered by the Dormitory Authority of the State of New York (DASNY) have included elevator rehabilitation and replacement of chillers and generators in multiple RPC buildings. In late 2024, DASNY also issued a procurement notice for a forensic conversion project at the Rochester Psychiatric Center campus.

== Oversight ==
The New York State Office of Mental Health Board of Visitors provides community involvement in monitoring the quality and management of services at state psychiatric facilities. An RPC patient information guide describes the Board of Visitors as a citizen advisory board that makes announced and unannounced visits and has the power to investigate complaints.

== See also ==
- New York State Office of Mental Health
