= Sherbrook Apartments (Syracuse, New York) =

- U.S. National Register of Historic Places
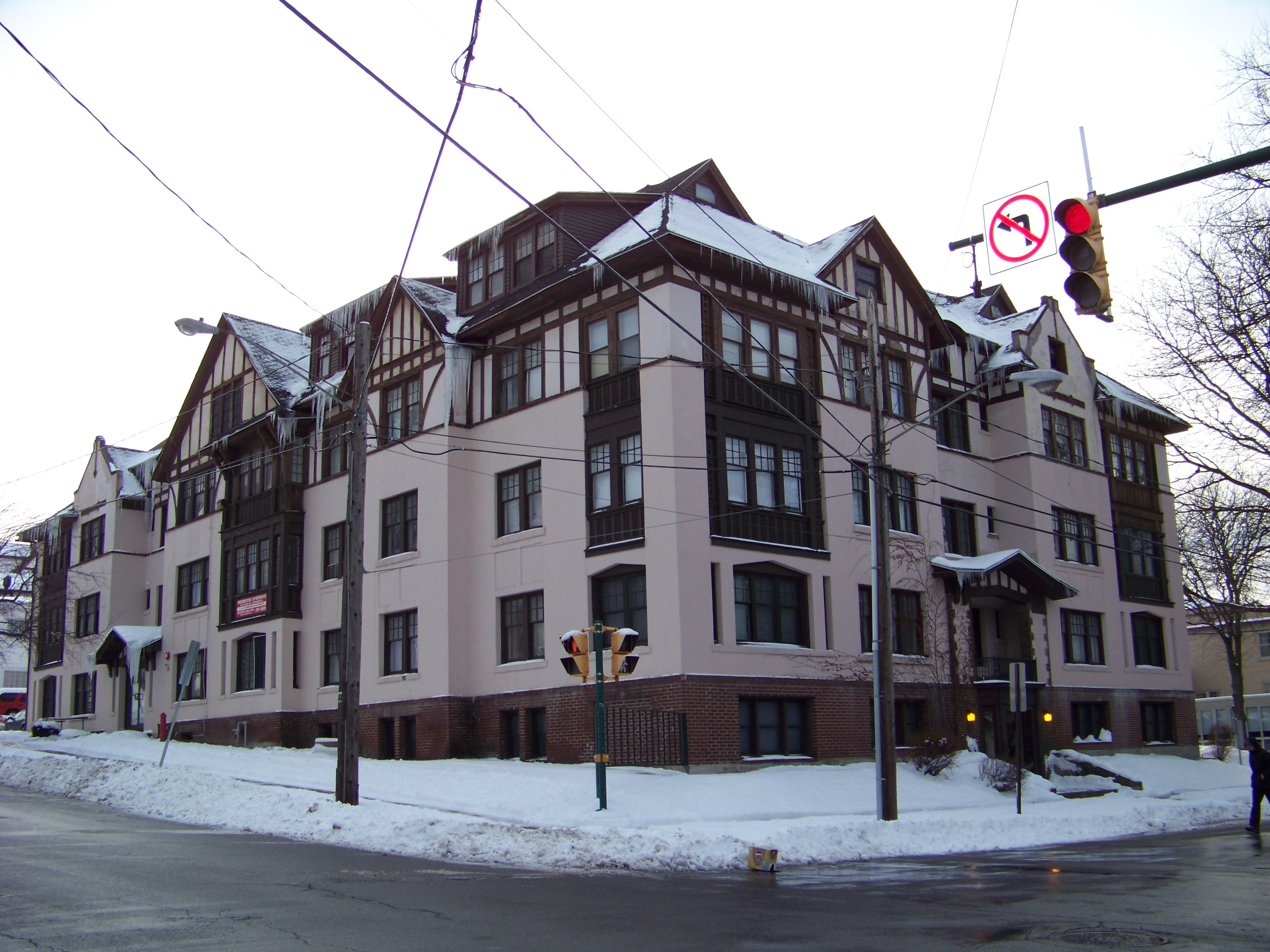

- Location within New York Location within the United States
- Location: 600–604 Walnut Ave., Syracuse, New York
- Coordinates: 43°2′42.1″N 76°7′58.47″W
- Built: 1914
- Architect: Ward Wellington Ward
- MPS: Architecture of Ward Wellington Ward in Syracuse MPS
- NRHP reference No.: 97000093
- Added to NRHP: February 14, 1997

The Sherbrook Apartments, 600-604 Walnut Ave., Syracuse, New York, designed by Ward Wellington Ward, were listed on the National Register of Historic Places in 1997.

== See also ==
- Walnut Park Historic District
