= Manhattan Psychiatric Center =

Coordinates: 40°47′21″N 73°55′47″W

- New York State Office of Mental Health
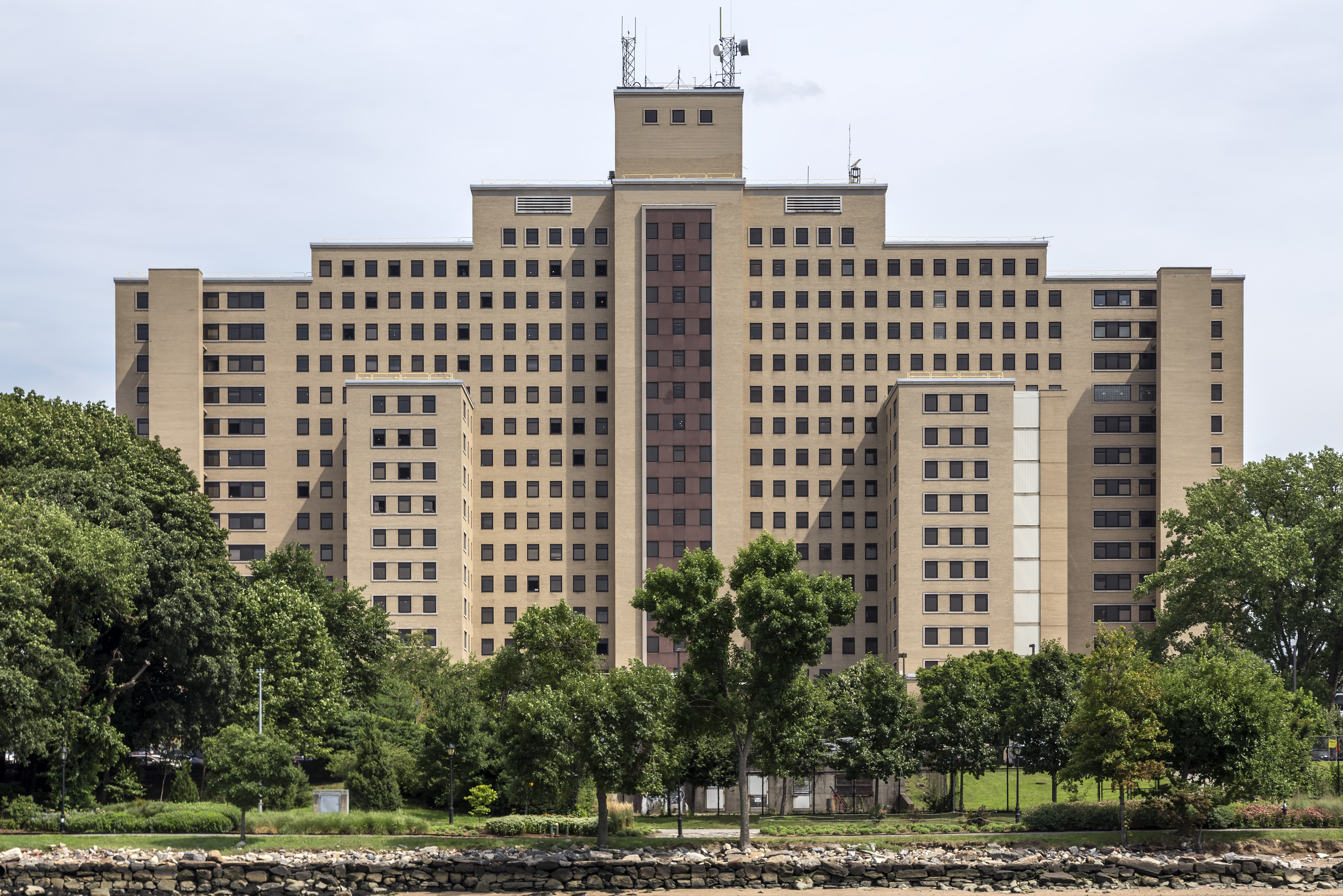
- The main building of the Manhattan Psychiatric Center from the Harlem River in 2017

Geography
- Location: New York City, New York, United States

Organization
- Type: Specialist

Services
- Beds: 509
- Speciality: Psychiatric hospital

History
- Former name: Dunlap-Manhattan Psychiatric Hospital
- Founded: 1848

Links
- Website: omh.ny.gov/omhweb/facilities/mapc/
- Lists: Hospitals in New York State

The Manhattan Psychiatric Center is a New York-state run psychiatric hospital on Wards Island in New York City. As of 2009, it was licensed for 509 beds, but holds only around 200 patients. The current building is 17 stories tall. The building strongly resembles the main building of the Creedmoor Psychiatric Center in Queens. It is adjacent to Kirby Forensic Psychiatric Center, a specialized facility for patients with criminal convictions.

== History ==
The hospital's roots date to 1848 when Wards Island was designated the reception area for immigrants. Some additional structures were originally part of Blackwell's Island Lunatic Asylum, which opened around 1863. The New York City Asylum for the Insane opened in 1863.

The building was significantly enlarged in 1871, and a Kirkbride Plan style building was built. After the immigration entry shifted to Ellis Island in 1892, the state took it over from Manhattan in 1899 and expanded it even further, renaming it the Manhattan State Hospital. At the time, it had 4,400 beds and was the largest psychiatric hospital in the world.

At the time, it was one of two psychiatric hospitals for residents of Manhattan that had been taken over by the state. The other psychiatric hospital would become the Central Islip Psychiatric Center in Central Islip, New York. Both hospitals were referred to as "Manhattan State Hospital".

A fire on February 18, 1923, killed 27 people: 24 patients and three attendants.

The current building complex was constructed in 1954.

In 1969, Manhattan State Hospital was subdivided into three separate hospitals, Dunlap, Meyer, and Kirby. In 1979, the three facilities were combined to become the Manhattan Psychiatric Center, which became affiliated with New York Medical Center. In 1981, the institution made one of its three buildings available to the Kirby Forensic Psychiatric Center, a specialty facility for patients involved with the criminal justice system.

The Manhattan Psychiatric Center is run and operated by the New York State Office of Mental Health, and the site is surrounded by Wards Island Park, which is administered by the New York City Department of Parks and Recreation.

== Notable patients ==
- Mabel Boll, "The Queen of Diamonds" died of a stroke at the facility in April 1949 at the age of 54.
- Ricardo Caputo, Argentine American serial killer, escaped from the hospital in 1974.
- Martin Hildebrandt, tattoo artist
- Scott Joplin was hospitalized in late January 1917 for dementia caused by syphilis, and died there two months later on April 1, 1917.
- Louis Pioggi, gangster
- Valerie Solanas, Radical feminist, who attempted to assassinate pop artist Andy Warhol, entered Dunlap-Manhattan Psychiatric in 1972 and escaped in 1973.
- Erno Soto, suspect in the Charlie Chop-off murders of 1972–73.
- Wilhelm Steinitz, the first undisputed world chess champion, was hospitalized with mental illness possibly caused by syphilis, and died there on August 12, 1900.
