= Kirby Forensic Psychiatric Center =

Psychiatric hospital in New York City

Kirby Forensic Psychiatry Center
- New York State Office of Mental Health
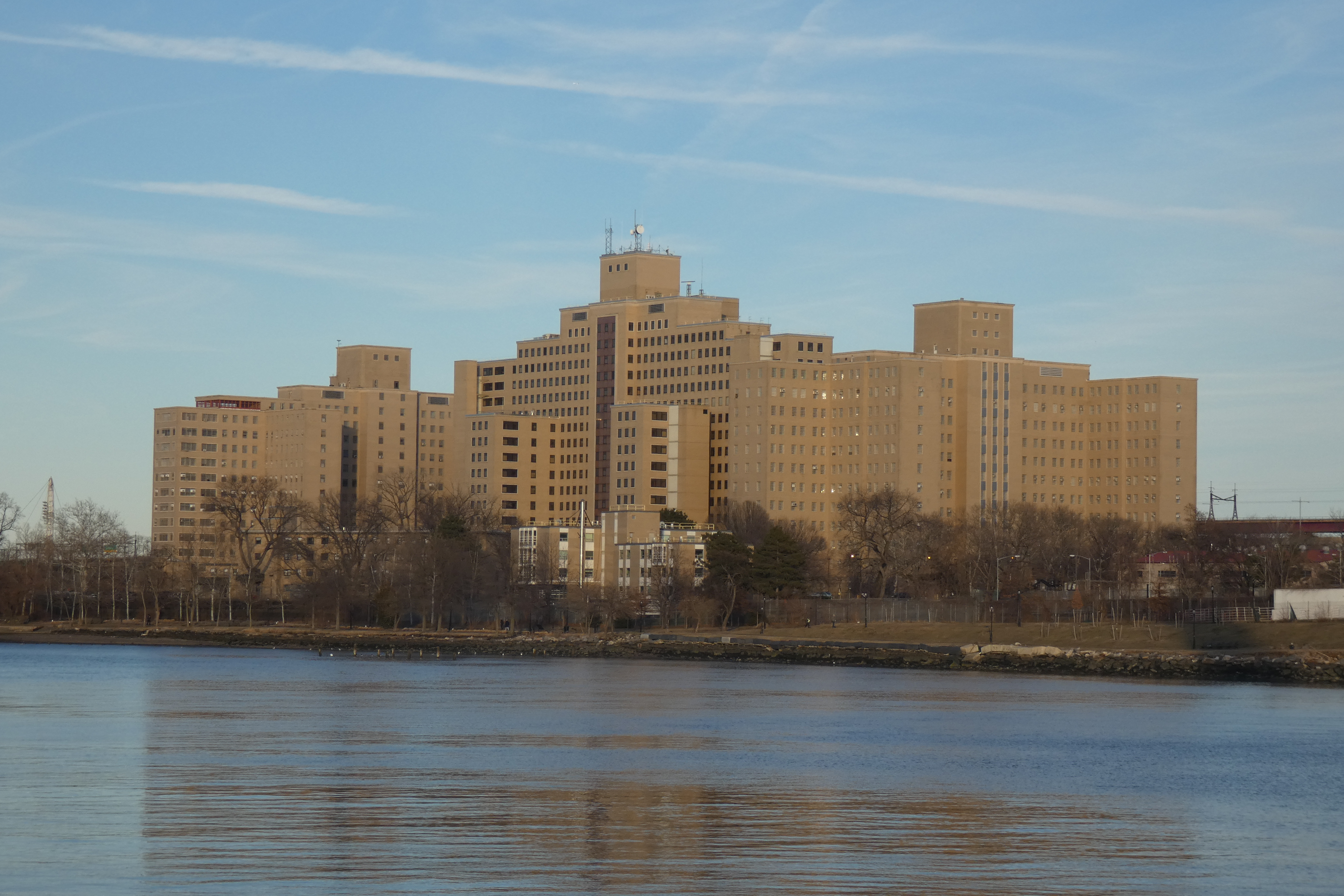
- The Wards Island psychiatric complex. Kirby occupies one of the three buildings.

Geography
- Location: New York City, New York, United States
- Coordinates: 40°47′21″N 73°55′47″W

Organization
- Type: Specialist

Services
- Beds: >200
- Speciality: Psychiatric hospital

Links
- Website: omh.ny.gov/omhweb/facilities/krpc/
- Lists: Hospitals in New York State

Kirby Forensic Psychiatric Center is a maximum-security facility for the mentally ill on Wards Island in New York City, operated by the New York State Office of Mental Health as one of two psychiatric hospitals in the state that treat felony patients. The building, described as "fortresslike", is adjacent to the Manhattan Psychiatric Center. Of its more than 200 patients, 50 are deemed criminally insane; it houses pre-trial detainees unfit to stand trial as well as convicted defendants granted an insanity plea. Among its famous historical inmates was murderer and cannibal Daniel Rakowitz.

== History ==
The Manhattan State Hospital was founded on Wards Island in 1899 as the largest psychiatric institution in the world. By the 1960s the number of patients had declined, and in December 1969 the hospital was divided into three centers, one of which was the Kirby Manhattan Psychiatric Center. In 1979 they were re-consolidated into the Manhattan Psychiatric Center. In 1981, the Kirby Forensic Psychiatric Center was split off from the center as a specialized facility for treating patients from the criminal justice system, occupying a 12-story building in the Wards Island complex.

As of 2019, the state was planning to close the facility and move its patients to the nearby Manhattan Psychiatric Center. The planned move was opposed by the clinicians' union and some of the facility's guards, as the Manhattan Psychiatric Center was not designed to house dangerous patients. Employees described the facility as a dangerous place to work; in a two-year period before 2014, there were 433 assaults by patients. In April 2020, during the COVID-19 pandemic, the hospital took in extra admissions to help the city's overburdened regular hospital system. State-run psychiatric hospitals were among the hardest-hit institutions in the early phase of the pandemic.
