= New York State Psychiatric Institute =

Geography
- Location: Washington Heights neighborhood, Manhattan, New York City, New York, United States
- Coordinates: 40°50′33″N 73°56′40″W

Organization
- Type: Psychiatric hospital
- Affiliated university: Columbia University Vagelos College of Physicians and Surgeons

History
- Opened: 1895

Links
- Website: nyspi.org
- Lists: Hospitals in New York State

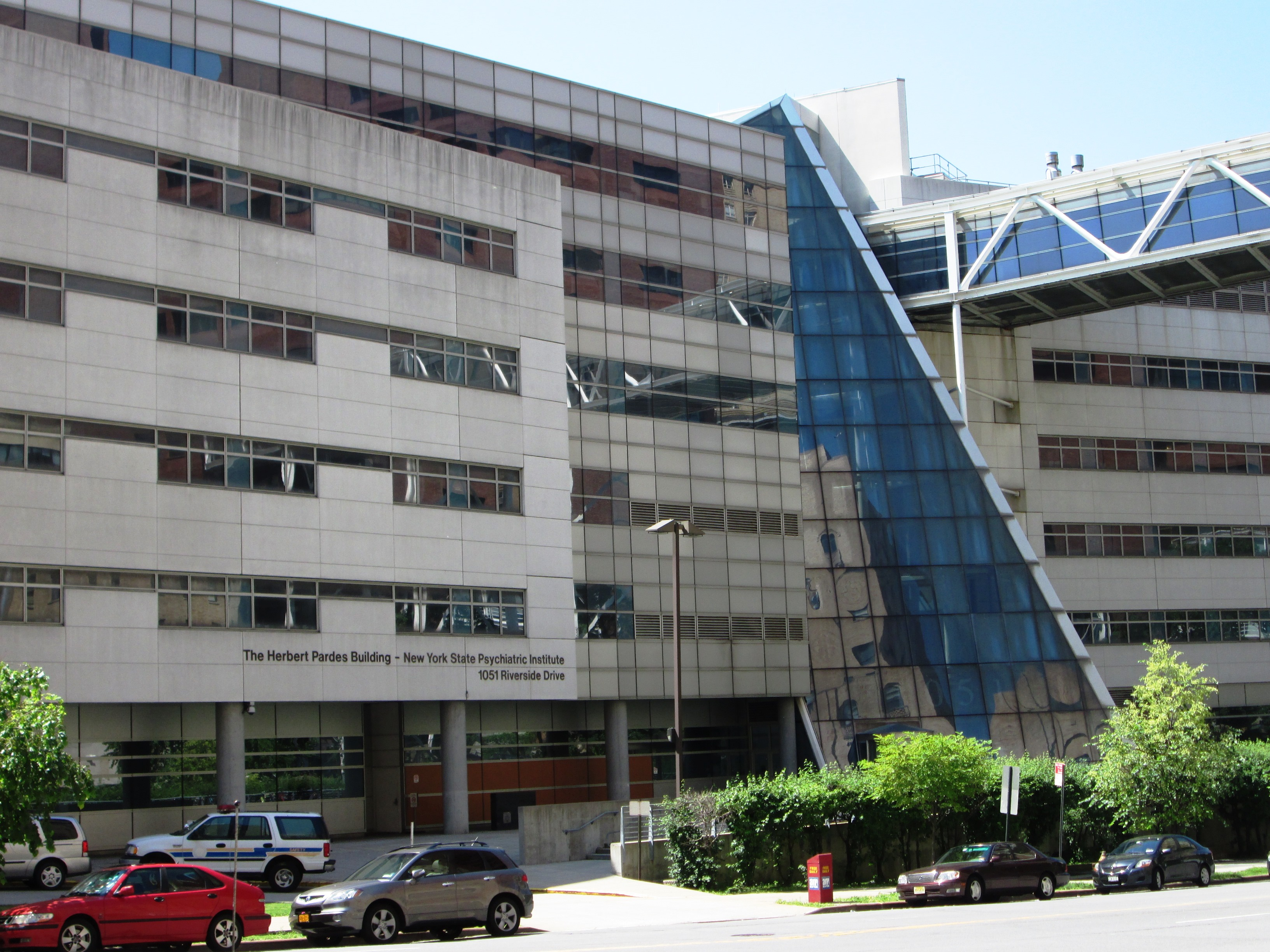
Herbert Pardes Building

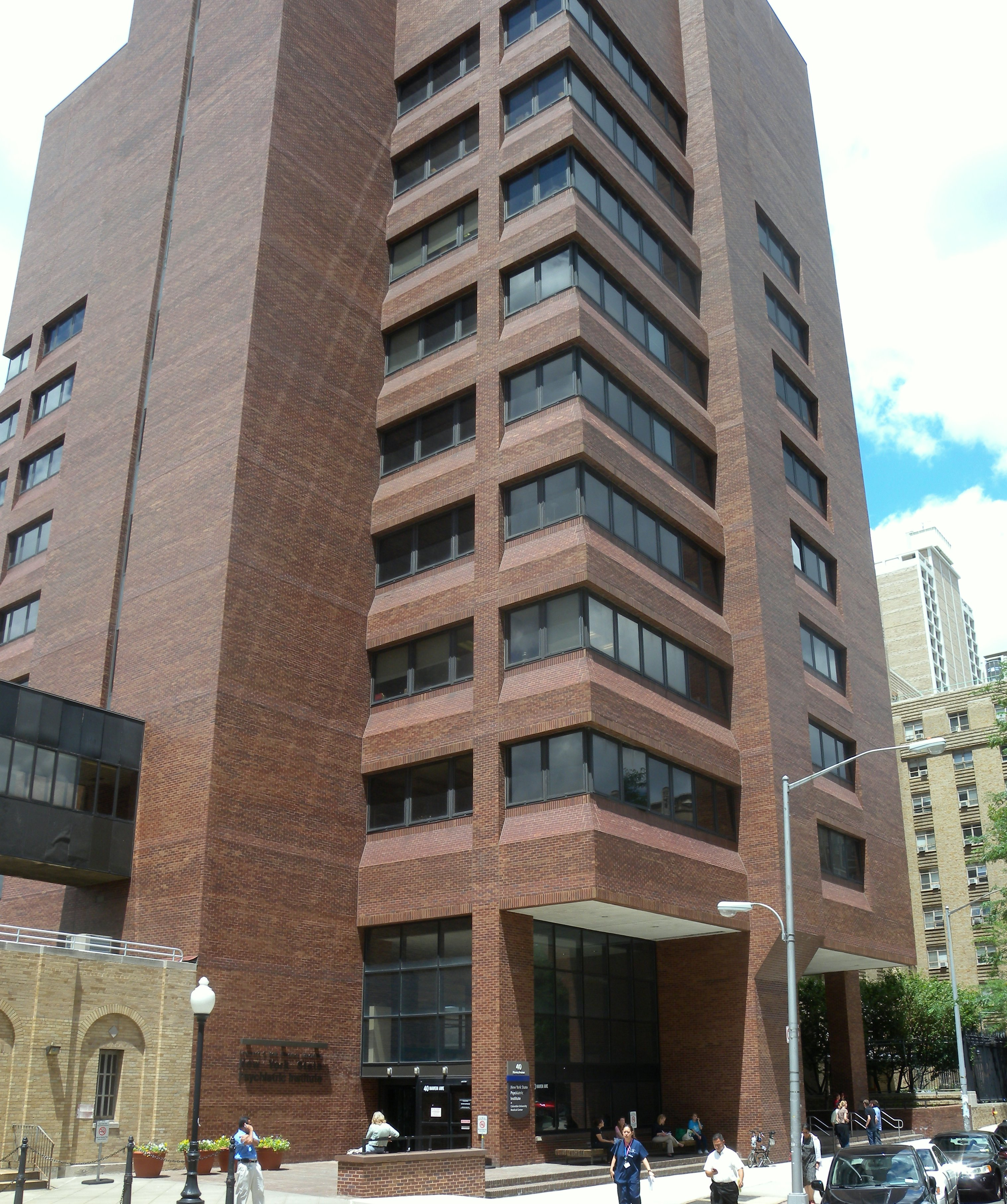
Kolb Research Labs

The New York State Psychiatric Institute, located at the Columbia University Irving Medical Center in the Washington Heights neighborhood of Manhattan, New York City, was established in 1895 as one of the first institutions in the United States to integrate teaching, research and therapeutic approaches to the care of patients with mental illnesses. In 1925, the Institute affiliated with Presbyterian Hospital, now NewYork-Presbyterian Hospital, adding general hospital facilities to the institute's psychiatric services and research laboratories.

Through the years, distinguished figures in American psychiatry have served as directors of the Psychiatric Institute, including Drs. Ira Van Gieson, Adolph Meyer, August Hoch, Otto Kernberg, Lawrence Kolb, Edward Sachar, Herbert Pardes and Jeffrey Lieberman. The current executive director is Dr. Joshua A. Gordon.

== History ==
The institute was established in 1895 by the New York State Hospital Commission as the Pathological Institute of the New York State Hospitals. In 1907, its name changed to Psychiatric Institute of the State Hospitals. The 1927 Mental Hygiene Law designated it as the New York State Psychiatric Institute. In December 1929, the institute opened as a unit of the Columbia-Presbyterian Medical Center, owned and operated by the state of New York under the supervision of the Department of Mental Hygiene.

== Other names ==
It is also known by the following names:

- New York State Psychiatric Institute and Hospital
- NYSPI (New York State Psychiatric Institute)
- Columbia-Presbyterian Medical Center. New York State Psychiatric Institute
- New York (State). New York State Psychiatric Institute
- New York (State). Psychiatric Institute
- New York (N.Y.). New York State Psychiatric Institute
- New York (State). State Psychiatric Institute

== Buildings ==
The institute has two buildings: the Herbert Pardes Building at 1051 Riverside Drive was built in 1998 and was designed by Peter Pran and Timothy Johnson of Ellerbe Becket. It is connected by walkway bridges to the high-rise Lawrence G. Kolb Research Laboratory at 40 Haven Avenue at West 168th Street, built in 1983 and designed by Herbert W. Reimer. Their original building at 722 West 168th Street became the Mailman's School of Public Health in 1999.

== Death of Harold Blauer ==
In 1953, Harold Blauer, a patient undergoing treatment for depression at the institute, died following an injection of the amphetamine MDA given without his permission as part of a U.S. Army experiment. The United States and New York state governments and the Psychiatric Institute attempted to cover up the incident, a fact accidentally discovered in 1975 during a Congressional inquiry on an unrelated matter. In 1987 a federal judge ordered the government to pay US$700,000 in compensation to Blauer's surviving daughter.
