= Dormitory Authority of the State of New York =

Public-benefit corporation in New York

- Company type: Public authority
- Industry: construction; finance; project management
- Founded: April 5, 1944; 81 years ago
- Headquarters: Albany, New York, United States
- Area served: New York State
- Key people: Robert J. Rodriguez, President & CEO; Lisa Gomez, Chair
- Website: www.dasny.org

The Dormitory Authority of the State of New York (DASNY /ˈdæzniː/) provides construction, financing, and allied services which serve the public good of New York State. More specifically, as a New York State public-benefit corporation, DASNY provides services for public and non-proprietary (i.e., nonprofit) private universities in New York State; for not-for-profit healthcare facilities in the State; and for other New York State-related institutions/purposes (such as State court facilities and State pension bonds). Like other public authorities in New York, DASNY has the flexibility to borrow on behalf of the state through legislative authorization, rather than incurring general obligation debt, which requires voter approval.

== Organization ==
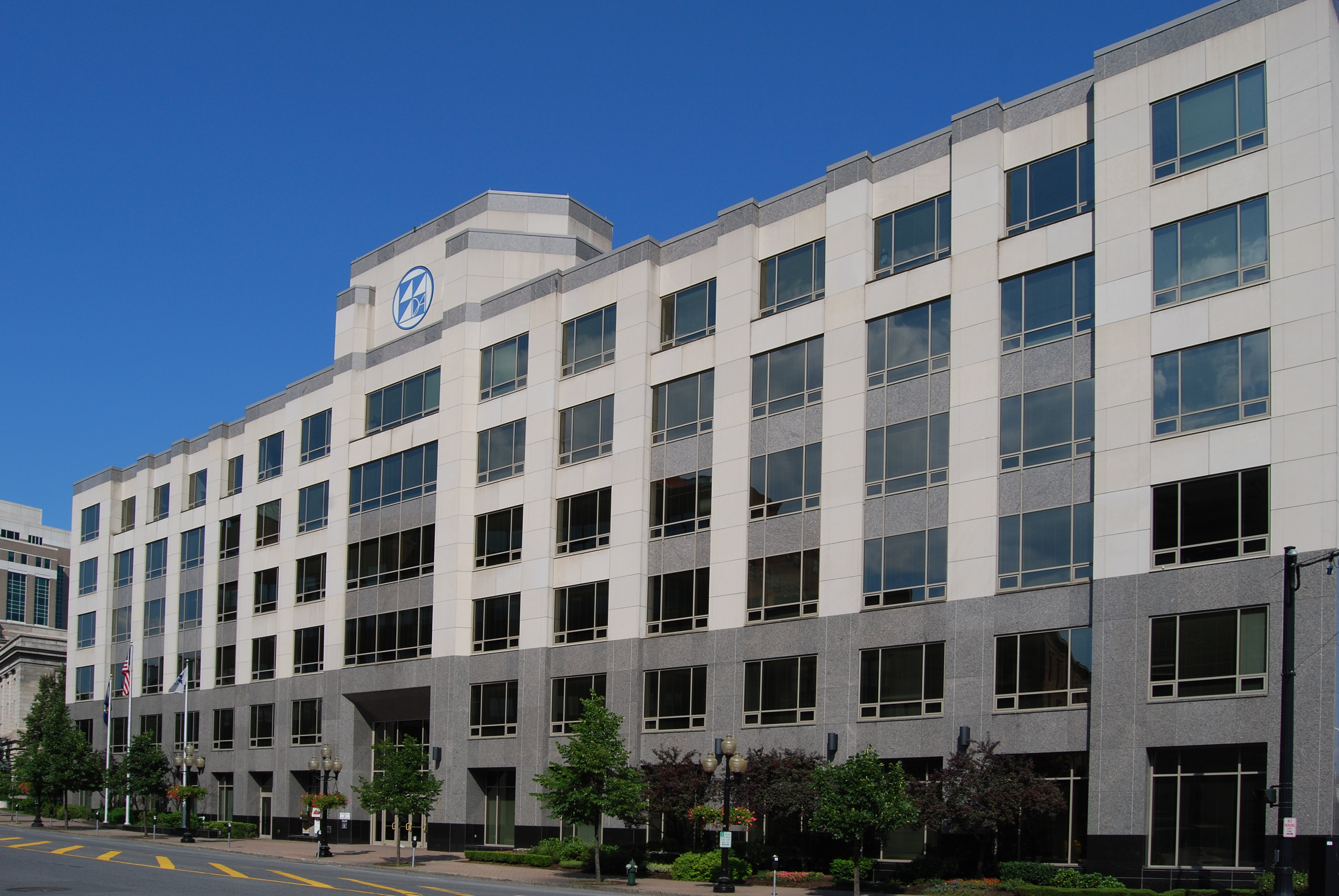
DASNY Headquarters on Broadway in Albany

The Authority is governed by an eleven-member board of directors: five board members are appointed by the governor, four serve ex officio, one is named by the Speaker of the New York State Assembly, and one is named by the majority leader of the New York State Senate. In 2017, the authority had operating expenses of $2.399 billion, an outstanding debt of $47.856 billion, and a staffing level of 557 people.

== History ==
DASNY was established by a law signed into action by New York Governor Thomas Dewey on April 5, 1944. At first, its only purpose was for the financing and construction of dormitories at eleven State Teachers' Colleges in New York. Since then, the Authority has constructed additional buildings, for different kinds of organizations, and significantly expanded the scope of services that it provides.

In 1964, DASNY gained the power to finance and construct facilities for hospitals with nursing schools. Legislation passed in 1987 enabled DASNY to finance and construct court facilities for New York's county and local governments.

In 1982, $300 million of DASNY funds had been lent to Lombard-Wall, Inc., a government securities firm that declared bankruptcy in August of that year. At the time of the bankruptcy filing, or shortly before, DASNY determined that $55 million of this amount lacked collateral, and was therefore at risk. The failure of Lombard-Wall prompted a re-examination of cash management by New York state agencies. A report later that year from the state Commission of Investigation called for the removal of two DASNY board members who, according to the commission, withheld damaging information about the risky investments from other board members. However, the commission found no evidence of corrupt practice or criminal wrongdoing. George D. Gould was appointed chairman of DASNY to direct its recovery efforts; Gould stepped down in 1985.

In 1995, DASNY merged with the Facilities Development Corporation and Medical Care Facilities Finance Agency, which continued to operate as the Dormitory Authortity, and as newly constructed, became the largest government building construction agency in the country, as well as the biggest public-authority issuer of tax-exempt bonds.

Issuance of DASNY bonds for economic development projects began in 1998, with the Community Enhancement Facilities Assistance Program (CEFAP). Since then, approximately $1.9 billion has been spent on a number of relatively small projects, through more than ten different programs, among them the State and Municipal Facilities Program (SAM). In 2015, $188 million was awarded across 640 awards. Critics, who accuse the agency of being a source of pork-barrel spending, have called for greater transparency in this exercise of Dormitory Authority borrowing power.

At the end of fiscal year 2015, DASNY's outstanding debt was more than $47 billion. Of this amount, $32 billion was issued on behalf of New York and its municipalities; $10 billion for independent colleges and universities and other non-profit organizations; and $4.9 billion for non-profit health care organizations.

== See also ==
- Empire State Development Corporation
- New York State Environmental Facilities Corporation
- State University Construction Fund
