= Irish in Syracuse, New York =

Irish immigrants came to the area around Syracuse, New York between 1776 and 1910. The Irish "Pioneers" came to Onondaga County from various parts of the Union. Some came directly from Ireland, many came from Canada and yet others came from countries to which they had previously emigrated.

Like all Irish who settled across the nation, the early Irish settlers in the area came to escape hunger, bad soil, and factional murders.

== Irish events ==
- Syracuse St. Patrick's Parade: held in March each year on the Saturday before St. Patrick's Day.
- Syracuse Irish Festival: held in September each year in Downtown Syracuse in Clinton Square and features music, dance, song, genealogy, culture and children’s activities.
- Tipp Hill Music Festival: late September since 2007 at Pass Arboretum, Avery and Whittier avenues, Syracuse. (Rain location is Burnet Park Ice Rink Pavilion - Free.)
- Tipp Hill Run: held in March each year before St. Patrick's Day.
