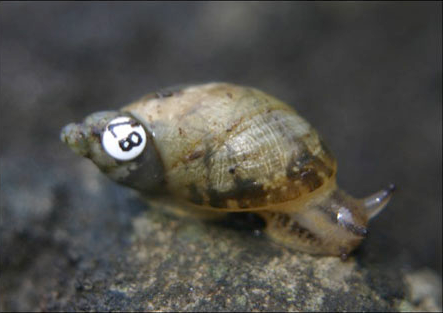
- Right side view of Novisuccinea chittenangoensis. The snail is marked with a number for monitoring the population.

Conservation status
- Data Deficient (IUCN 3.1)

- Critically Imperiled (NatureServe)

Scientific classification
- Kingdom: Animalia
- Phylum: Mollusca
- Class: Gastropoda
- Order: Stylommatophora
- Family: Succineidae
- Genus: Novisuccinea
- Species: N. chittenangoensis

Binomial name
- Novisuccinea chittenangoensis (Pilsbry, 1908)

Synonyms
- Succinea ovalis chittenangoensis Pilsbry, 1908; Succinea chittenangoensis Pilsbry, 1908

= Chittenango ovate amber snail =

Species of gastropod

The Chittenango ovate amber snail (Novisuccinea chittenangoensis) is a species of small air-breathing land snail in the family Succineidae, the amber snails. This species was discovered in 1905, and was reported three years later as a subspecies of the oval ambersnail, Succinea ovalis. Several taxonomic reviews took place in the subsequent decades until the end of the 1980s, when the Chittenango ovate amber snail was finally judged to be a distinct species based on chemical and morphological data.

The Chittenango ovate amber snail is endemic to the Chittenango area of Madison County, New York, United States. There is only one population, located at Chittenango Falls State Park in central New York, even though it was believed to have a broader range previously; based on fossil records, some authors argue that the distribution of this species may have been much wider in the past. In opposition to this, other authors argue that it is impossible to identify this species based on fossil records, because they only allow for examination of shell features. Shell features of species in this particular family of snails are usually not very distinctive.

Novisuccinea chittenangoensis has a small (an average of 20.9 mm in length in adult individuals), delicate, ovate shell of 3¼ whorls, with deep sutures. The shell is almost translucent, and varies in color from a chalky pale yellow to white, with a glossy surface. Several internal organs of the animal can be distinguished through the shell's outer surface. The visible soft parts of the animal are of a pale subtranslucent yellow color, with different markings during distinct stages of development.

Studies on the ecology of the Chittenango ovate amber snail are fairly recent. It is an herbivorous species which lives in the fresh spray zone of the Chittenango Falls, in partially sunlit areas with lush herbaceous growth. Several parameters appear to be influential in its habitat selection, namely humidity, substrate, temperature, vegetation, and water quality. Novisuccinea chittenangoensis is a hermaphroditic species, and its mating season is from May through July. It lays egg clusters, each one containing an average of 8 to 14 eggs, at the base of plants, under matted vegetation, or in loose, wet soil. Maturity is reached in five to eight months, and its life span is roughly 2.5 years. Some of its predators include insects, amphibians, mammals, birds, and occasionally other snails.

Since the time of its discovery in 1905, there have been many attempts to estimate the population size of this species. Results varied greatly, but the more recent ones suggest a very reduced number of individuals. This coupled with a very restricted distribution have led to the listing of Novisuccinea chittenangoensis as an endangered or threatened species. Humans frequently invade its habitat, though such disturbances have been greatly reduced by preventive measures. Recent efforts in conservation include perpetuating the extant population at a baseline size as well as maintaining captive populations.

== Taxonomy ==
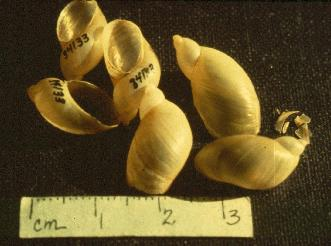
The type specimens of Novisuccinea chittenangoensis in the Philadelphia Academy of Natural Sciences, collected by the American malacologist Leslie Raymond Hubricht

The snail was first discovered at Chittenango Falls in August 1905 by a field party from the Academy of Natural Sciences of Philadelphia. In 1908, Henry Augustus Pilsbry reported the discovery, describing the snail as a subspecies of the widely distributed Succinea ovalis. Because of this, the Chittenango ovate amber snail is referred to in many publications as Succinea ovalis chittenangoensis.

Pilsbry placed Succinea ovalis in the subgenus Novisuccinea in 1948. Alan Solem (1976) considered this snail to be merely a form of Succinea ovalis, citing similarities in genitalia and radula, and attributing shell differences to, possibly, a marked genetic mutation. Grimm (1981) considered it to be a distinct species due to external morphological differences (color and shell shape). By 1981, Succinea ovalis could not be found at the Falls; however, during sampling for Hoagland's electrophoretic analyses, Succinea ovalis was found at two locations within approximately 16 kilometers of Chittenango Falls. Individuals assigned to Novisuccinea chittenangoensis appeared to be divided into two color morphs, a "gray morph" that was relatively common and widespread at the Falls, and a "red morph" that was restricted to the ledges at the base of the Falls. A preliminary analysis by Hoagland (1984) stated unequivocally that the red and the gray morphs were two distinct species, possibly in separate genera. Solem examined specimens of the gray morph and assigned it to Succinea putris, an introduced snail possibly from Europe which appears to crowd out all other species.

Hoagland and Davis (1987) subsequently completed a thorough analysis, based on electrophoresis, shell morphology, and internal anatomy, of the succineids at Chittenango Falls. They divided Succinea into two genera, keeping the Old World Succinea in the genus and elevating the New World Succinea, of the Section Novisuccinea including ovalis and chittenangoensis, to the genus level. They also determined that the Old World Succinea putris is probably a species complex and that the gray morph, although closely related to Succinea putris sensu lato, is a distinct species, which they designated Succinea sp. B. Based on these factors, the species designation Novisuccinea chittenangoensis is considered valid. Both species have been observed with red and gray morphs, bringing into question whether the earlier separation truly represented taxonomic distinctiveness. Currently, Novisuccinea chittenangoensis, Succinea sp. B, and 3–4 Oxyloma spp. are considered to be the only succineid species present at Chittenango Falls. In 2003, the U.S. Geological Survey (T. King, unpublished data) amplified and sequenced the cytochrome oxidase I region of mitochondrial DNA and the ITS-1 region of nuclear DNA in Novisuccinea chittenangoensis and Succinea sp. B. The results (sequence divergence of 10–15 percent) suggest large differences between the two species. No hybridization was observed.

== Distribution ==
Map of New York
The red dot is Chittenango, where the Chittenango ovate amber snail is found

The only verified extant colony of Novisuccinea chittenangoensis is the type population, which is at Chittenango Falls, in Chittenango Falls State Park, 3.6 miles north of Cazenovia, between the towns of Cazenovia and Chittenango, in Madison County, New York. At various times in the past, the species has been thought to have a broader range. To date, although many potentially suitable colony sites have been searched, no colony has been conclusively identified as Novisuccinea chittenangoensis outside of the Chittenango Falls area.

During the summer of 1982, "sub-fossil" shells of what appeared to be Novisuccinea chittenangoensis were found in the banks on the west side of Chittenango Creek near the Falls. Grimm (1981) postulated that Pleistocene deposits of what was originally described as Novisuccinea ovalis pleistocenica (Baker, 1927) are in fact shells of Novisuccinea chittenangoensis, and that this species was widely distributed during the Pleistocene epoch. Shell specimens have been recorded from Yarmouthian Interglacial, Sangamonian Stage, and Wisconsinan Stage deposits in the states of Arkansas, Illinois, Iowa, Michigan, Missouri, and Nebraska, and in Ontario. Alan Solem, however, questioned the assignment of the fossil succineid shell deposits to any species group. Although Hubricht (1985) mapped the location of extant populations of Novisuccinea chittenangoensis to include New York, West Virginia, Virginia, Tennessee, and North Carolina, with fossil records from Iowa, Illinois, Missouri, and Arkansas, Hoagland and Davis (1987) concluded that there is only one verified extant population of Novisuccinea chittenangoensis and that it is impossible to verify fossil records as being Novisuccinea chittenangoensis based on shell characteristics alone.

== Description ==
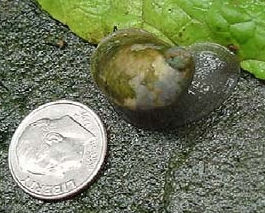
A captive individual of Novisuccinea chittenangoensis at the Rosamond Gifford Zoo (the dime coin is 18 mm in diameter)

The shell of Novisuccinea chittenangoensis is ovate, slender, acute, and of moderate thickness. The shell suture is deep. The spire is gently convex, laterally compressed, with 3¼ whorls. The spire is long, slightly less than half the shell length, and the aperture is very oblique. The shell color is subtranslucent, calcareous pale yellow to white. The surface is somewhat glossy and marked with growth wrinkles and lines. The size varies somewhat, but adult specimens of the type lot averaged 20.9 millimeters (mm) in shell length. Various adult specimens measured during the summer of 1981 and 1982 ranged from 19 to 24 mm.

Hatchlings measure 1 to 2 mm in shell length, and yearlings average around 10 mm. Measurements of all Novisuccinea chittenangoensis in 2002 ranged from 7 to 23 mm.

The base color of the living animal is very pale subtranslucent yellow. The mantle, kidney, and hepatopancreas are visible through the shell but are often slightly obscured by the thickness of the shell. The dorsal surface of the mantle is pale yellow, tinted with olive, often marked with black streaks and blotches. Over the hepatopancreas is a golden yellow tessellation that is marked with gray or black spots and streaks. A dark marking on the posterior surface of the foot is distinctive. However, the mark is not present on the hatchlings, making them impossible to identify in the field. The mark becomes obvious once the snail reaches approximately 6 to 9 mm in length.

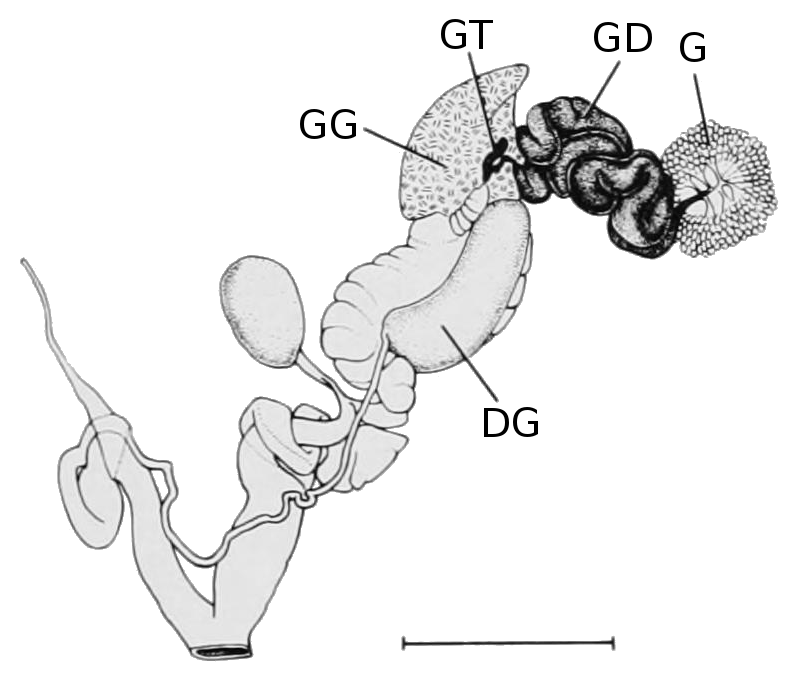
Drawing of a reproductive system of Novisuccinea chittenangoensis. Scale bar is 5 mm. GG - albumen gland, GT - talon, GD - hermaphoroditic duct, G - ovotestis, DG - prostate.

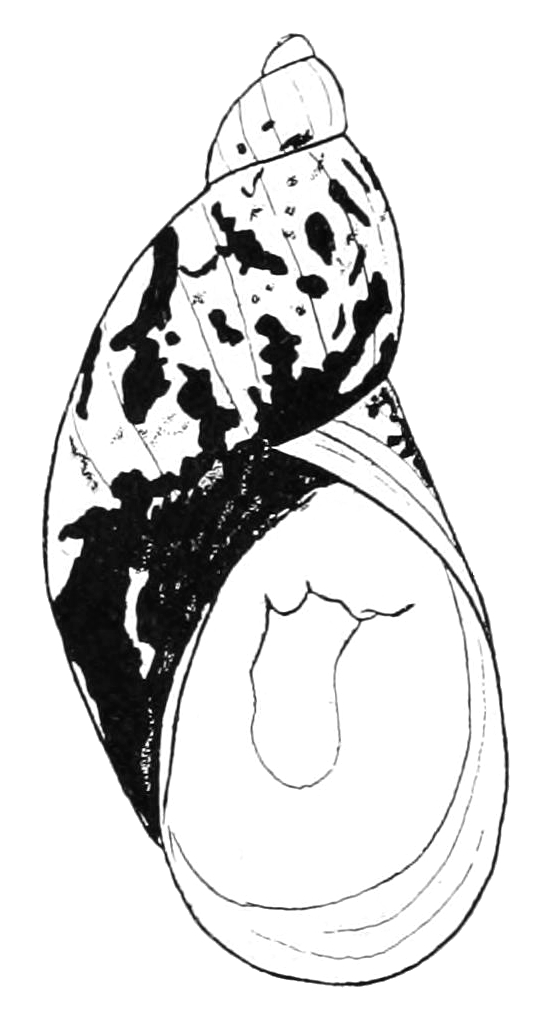
Apertural view of live retracted animal

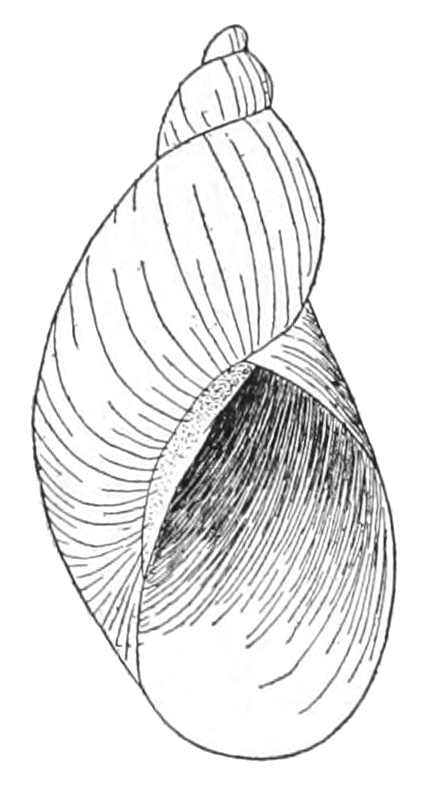
Apertural view of the shell

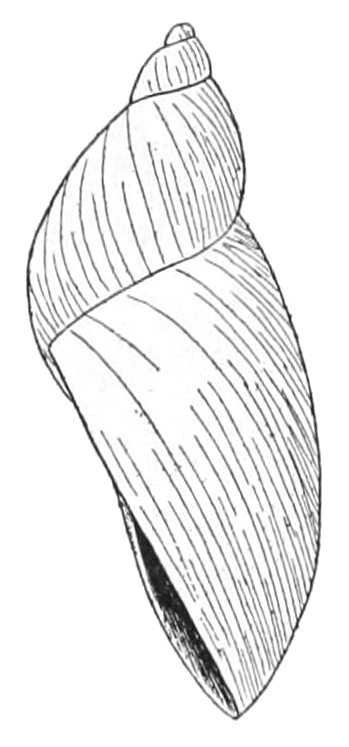
Lateral view of the shell

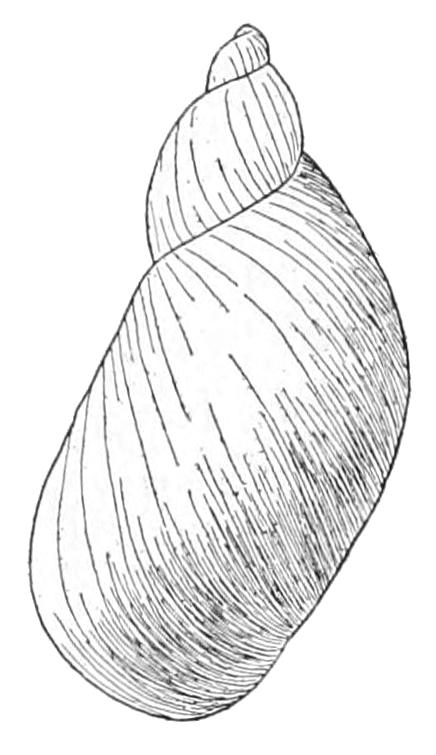
Abapertural view of the shell

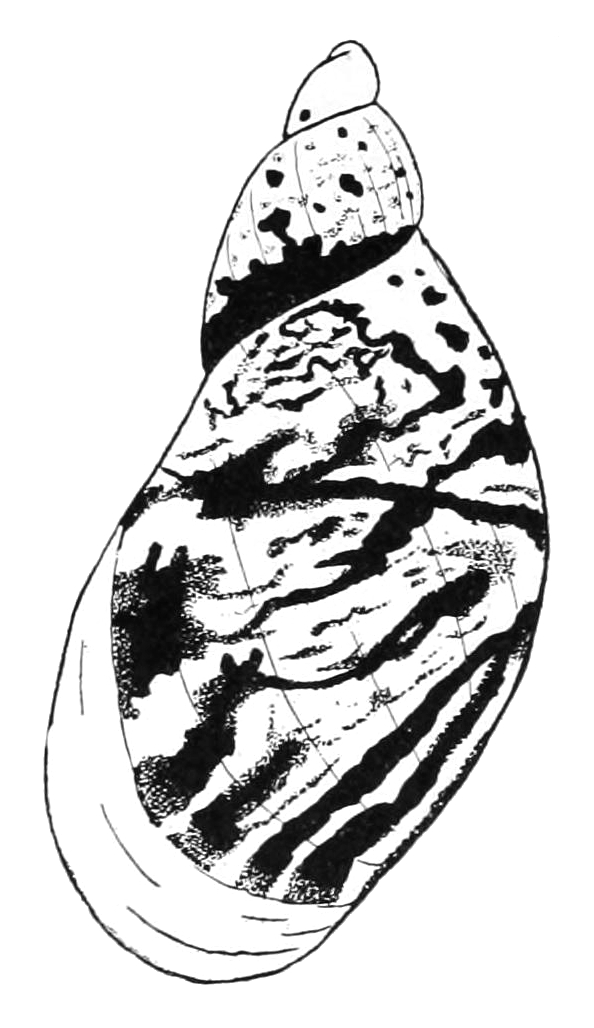
Abapertural view of live retracted animal with soft parts visible through the shell

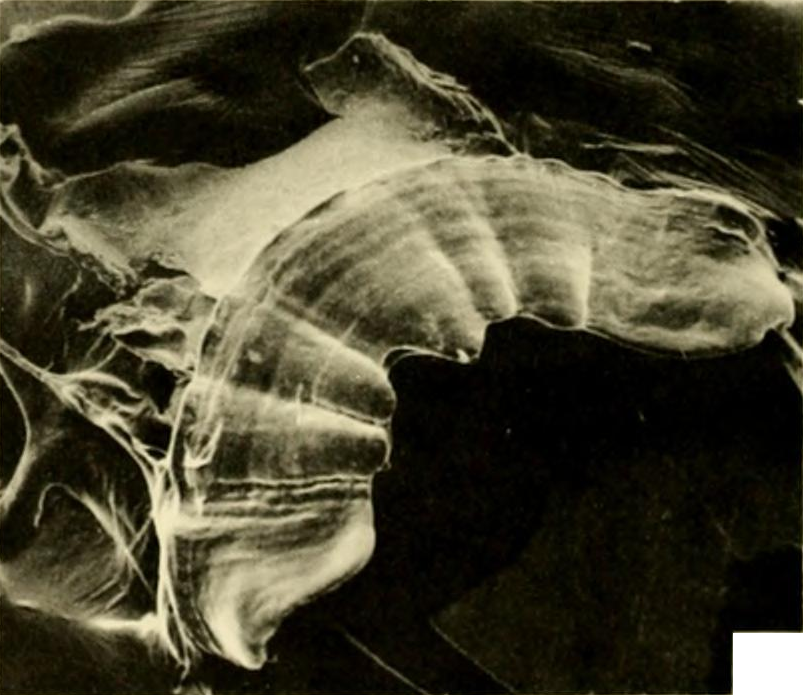
Jaw

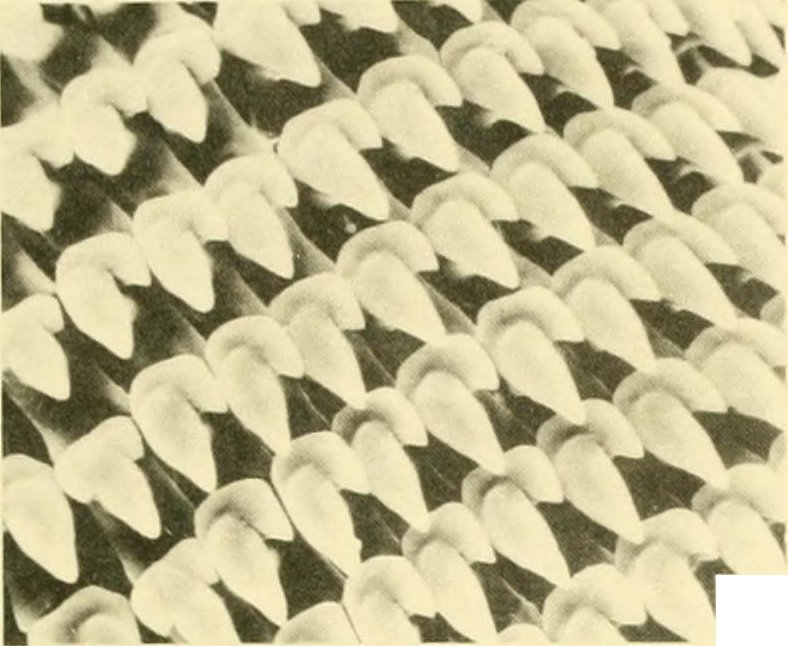
Lateral and marginal teeth of radula

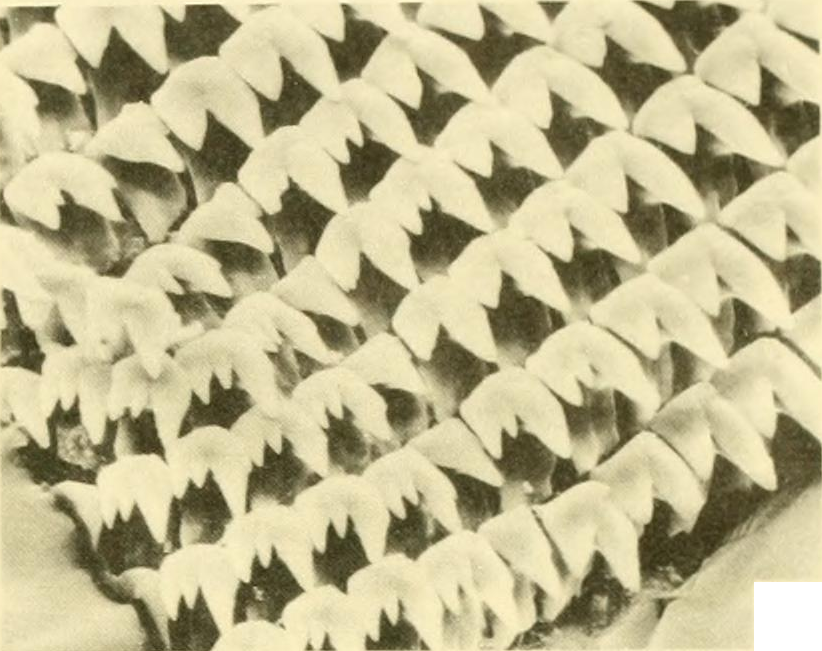
Central and early lateral teeth of radula

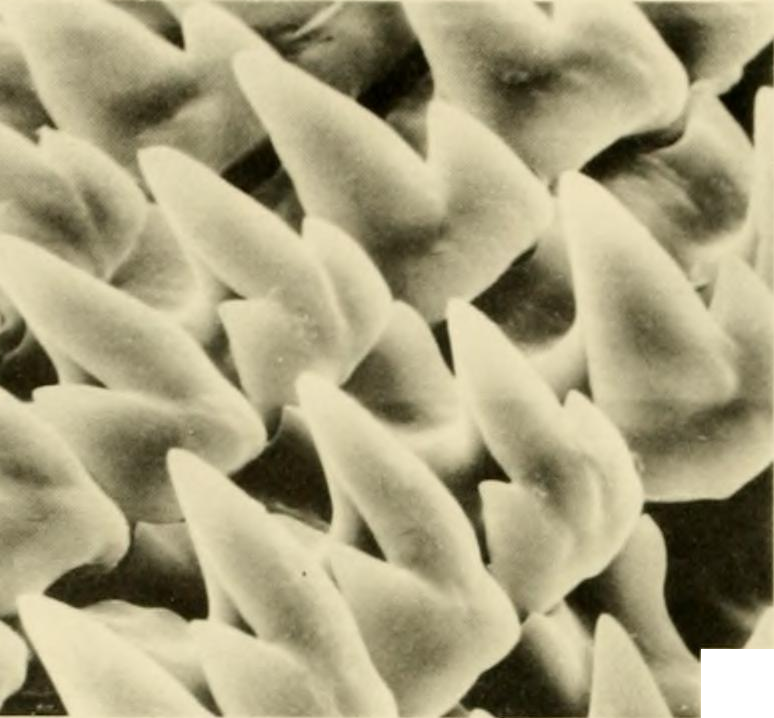
Detail of radula

== Ecology ==
Until recently, relatively little was known about the biology of the Chittenango ovate amber snail. Studies by investigators at the State University of New York College of Environmental Science and Forestry (ESF) since 1981 have contributed to the base of knowledge about the biology and life history of Novisuccinea chittenangoensis. Aloi (1985) analyzed the population dynamics of the succineid snails at Chittenango Falls. Thomee (1986) investigated their behavioral ecology, and Molloy and Norton (1993) developed techniques for captive propagation. Molloy (1995) reported on the captive population of Novisuccinea chittenangoensis and associated field studies related to factors influencing the distribution of Succinea sp. B. Confusion on snail identification may have affected the results of Thomee's and Aloi's work, but by the time Molloy's study was initiated, the identification problems had been resolved.

=== Habitat ===
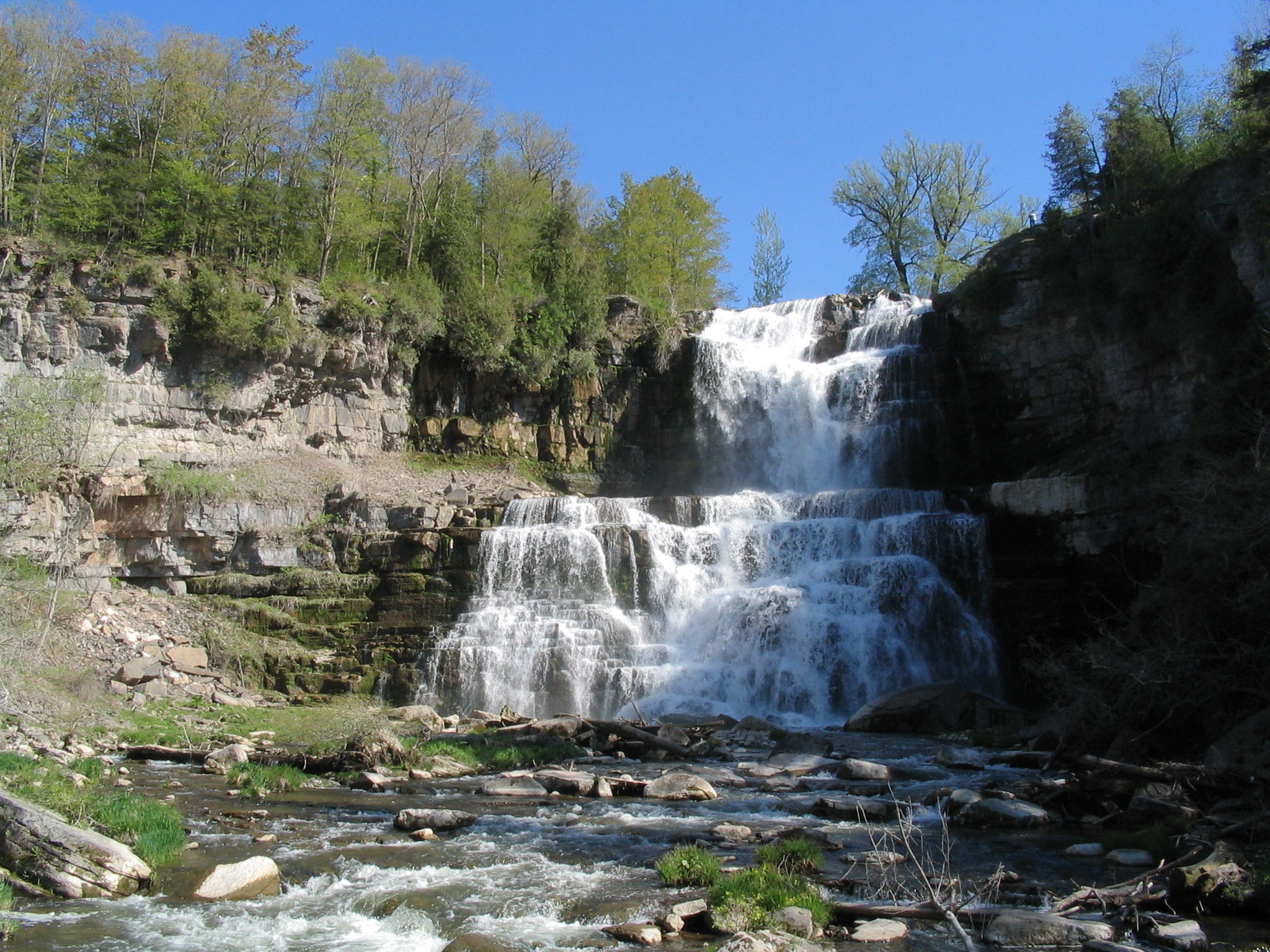
The habitat of Novisuccinea chittenangoensis is a ravine on the east side of the Chittenango Falls (the area can be seen to the left in this photo)

Novisuccinea chittenangoensis survives in and presumably prefers cool, partially sunlit areas of lush herbaceous growth within the spray zone of the Falls.

The habitat of Novisuccinea chittenangoensis lies within the ravine at the base of the 167-foot-tall waterfall formed by Chittenango Creek as it flows north from its origin toward Oneida Lake. This north-south oriented ravine forms a deep gorge that is shaded or partially shaded throughout most of the growing season, resulting in a microclimate that stays relatively cool during the summer, and because of the creek flow and ice formations, is relatively warm in the winter compared to the surrounding area. Spring thaws and periodic major rainfall events tend to remove vegetation from significant portions of the primary Novisuccinea chittenangoensis habitat.

Pilsbry (1948) reported that Novisuccinea chittenangoensis was found "on a sloping weedy talus near the foot of the falls." The only sloping weedy talus is on the east side of the Falls. This area is adjacent to and between the vegetated ledge at the base of the Falls where Novisuccinea chittenangoensis now occurs and the spring-fed watercress beds previously reported to be Novisuccinea chittenangoensis habitat. Presence of Novisuccinea chittenangoensis has not been verified on the west side of the Falls.

Thomee (1986) mapped the habitat occupied by Novisuccinea chittenangoensis. The snails occupied an area of 53.7 m^{2} at the base of the Falls, with most snails found in an area of 11.4 m^{2}. More intense studies from 2002 to 2004 have further defined the occupied habitat. Novisuccinea chittenangoensis is found on a ledge beginning at 4 m from the eastern edge of the Falls and extending to 16 m from the Falls. In addition, Novisuccinea chittenangoensis can be found on the middle ledge 4 m above the primary ledge and in the talus as far as 3 m downslope from the primary ledge.

=== Habitat parameters ===
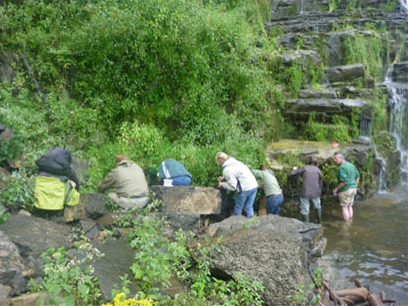
U.S. Fish and Wildlife Service, New York State Department of Environmental Conservation, and other partners regularly survey the Chittenango Falls for Novisuccinea chittenangoensis.

Five parameters appear to have significance in the preferred habitat: humidity, substrate, temperature, vegetation, and water quality.

Humidity: Novisuccinea chittenangoensis appears to require sustained, very high humidity. Active snails were found only when relative humidity approached 100 percent; during dry periods, snails were found to be relatively inactive. Portions of the habitat and substrate are consistently at near maximum humidity or saturation in the spray zone of the Falls. However, during 2002, the majority of Novisuccinea chittenangoensis were found >5 m from the edge of the ledge nearest the Falls. Recent monitoring (prior to 2006) with temperature and humidity data loggers shows that these snails occur in an area where the humidity generally varies from 80 to 100 percent during the active season. Further investigation is needed into seasonal and annual hydrological conditions within the Chittenango Creek watershed and at the Falls relative to the high-humidity areas used by Novisuccinea chittenangoensis.

Substrate: Novisuccinea chittenangoensis appears to be a calciphile, requiring a substrate either derived from either limestone, dolomite or rich in calcium carbonate from other sources. The dynamic nature of its habitat does not allow for development of soil.

Temperature: The species appears to require the cool, mild temperatures and relatively constant conditions provided by the waterfalls and the mist they generate. Water volume and flow rates within the Chittenango Creek watershed influence the size of the waterfall as well as the mist-zone and the actual temperature at the site. Active Novisuccinea chittenangoensis are generally found at temperatures from 12 to 20 °C. During warmer periods, snails retreat to cool areas provided by the moist rock and moss, or aestivate in the vegetation. During cold winter temperatures, it is believed that the snails at the Falls retreat into cracks or fissures in the rocks and remain inactive. Various temperature readings were gathered during the summers of 1980-1982. In the spray zone, the rock surface temperatures averaged 16 °C, the moss averaged 14 °C, and the combined temperatures of the substrate, water, and vegetation averaged 16 °C. Seasonal and daily temperature variation has been monitored for 2 years using data loggers that record temperature every hour, but this data has not yet been analyzed (Breisch, unpublished data).

Vegetation: Most of the spray zone adjacent to the Falls is covered with patches of various mosses, liverworts, and other low herbaceous vegetation, including Eutrochium purpureum, Angelica atropurpurea, and Aster spp. In addition, watercress Nasturtium officinale increased after the 1993 flood event. Novisuccinea chittenangoensis were found on vegetation up to 92 cm above the ground and at 1/3 the maximum sunlight intensities of the sympatric Succinea sp. B. Vegetation is quite sparse on the west side of the Falls, and the only snails that have been observed there are Succinea sp. B. In drier talus adjacent to the mossy areas are various plant species, such as eastern skunk cabbage Symplocarpus foetidus and Angelica atropurpurea, upon which Succinea sp. B has also been found. During periods of heavy water flow, dew, or rain, when the vegetation is saturated, the snails have been observed actively crawling on the vegetation. During drier times, both species of snails attach themselves to the underside of leaves with a mucous epiphragm. In the patch of watercress, the vegetation is dense and lush. Although the watercress is dominant, other species include Angelica atropurpurea, jewelweed Impatiens capensis and Impatiens pallida, forget-me-nots Myosotis scorpioides, various mints Mentha spp., and poison ivy Toxicodendron radicans, which again support Succinea sp. B but not Novisuccinea chittenangoensis. The ledges where Novisuccinea chittenangoensis is found clearly comprise an early successional sere, periodically rejuvenated to a bare rock substrate by flood waters.

Water quality: It may be fair to presume that clean water is necessary to maintain essential habitat and a healthy population of Novisuccinea chittenangoensis, just as it is to the survival of many other invertebrates; however, since Novisuccinea chittenangoensis is a terrestrial snail, the effects of water quality are expected to be somewhat indirect. While water quality may play a potential role in the success or decline of Novisuccinea chittenangoensis, this relationship has not been clearly defined to date.

=== Life cycle ===
The snails mate from May through July, and lay eggs from June through July. They are hermaphroditic; however, it is unclear if self-fertilization is possible. The eggs, numbering 8 to 14, are approximately 2 mm in diameter, spherical, transparent, and very distinctive within a cluster. Generally, Novisuccinea chittenangoensis eggs are not found to have a heavy gelatinous layer surrounding the entire cluster, which is associated with egg masses of Succinea sp. B. Novisuccinea chittenangoensis egg clusters are deposited at the base of plants, under matted vegetation, or in loose, wet soil. The young snails hatch in 2 to 3 weeks, measuring barely 2 mm. It is still unclear when the snails mature, although Grimm (1981) believes they reach maturity in five to eight months, or the spring following hatching. At the end of their first full year of growth, snails observed by Aloi and Ringler (1982) averaged around 10 mm. By the end of the following year, the adult snails were observed to reach a length of approximately 21 mm; they then die, completing a life span of about 2.5 years. This life span is similar to those in captive populations (Rosamond Gifford Zoo, unpublished data).

=== Feeding habits ===
Novisuccinea chittenangoensis apparently feed on microflora and must obtain high levels of calcium carbonate from their environment for proper shell formation. Novisuccinea chittenangoensis were generally found on green vegetation, whereas Succinea sp. B was more frequently found on dead vegetation.

=== Predators ===
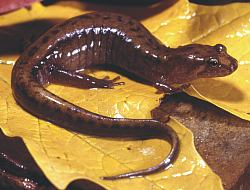
The Allegheny Mountain dusky salamander is one of the known predators of the Chittenango ovate amber snail.

Predators may include beetles and sciomyzid fly larvae, many of which specialize in feeding upon snails. Other potential predators may include the northern two-lined salamander (Eurycea bislineata), northern dusky salamander (Desmognathus fuscus), and Allegheny Mountain dusky salamander (Desmognathus ochrophaeus), which are common in the talus and on the ledges, as well as various small mammals or passerine birds such as robins and pigeons, which are often seen in or near the habitat. Although predation does not appear to be a limiting factor at this time, its potential impact on a low or stressed population is unclear. The 1978 listing rule included predation by the introduced European snails, Discus rotundatus and Oxychilus spp. as serious threats to Novisuccinea chittenangoensis. Little is currently known about this relationship.

=== Interspecific relationships ===
Interactions with Succinea sp. B may be having a significant impact on Novisuccinea chittenangoensis, as both species may be competing for food, breeding or wintering habitat. Hubricht (1985) reported that Succinea putris (Succinea sp. B of Hoagland and Davis) is a "very common species within its range. I found no other Succineidae with it. It appears to crowd out all other species." It does not appear that the other sympatric snail species (e.g., Oxyloma spp.) occurring at the Falls are having a significant impact on Novisuccinea chittenangoensis, as they are thought to be native species. There are no reports of disease or parasites threatening Novisuccinea chittenangoensis.

== Population size ==
Accurate population trends are not available for this species. The species was supposedly found "in great abundance" when a field party collected it in 1905, but was not surveyed again until 1954, when Hubricht found it in "equal abundance" with Novisuccinea ovalis. Grimm found Novisuccinea ovalis more abundant than Novisuccinea chittenangoensis during field surveys in 1964, 1965, and 1973. In 1972, Grimm estimated the total Novisuccinea chittenangoensis population at less than 200, but Solem estimated it at about 500 in 1974. Three investigators spent two hours searching the habitat in 1973 and located only 13 specimens; a trip later that summer yielded none. Surveys by the New York State Department of Environmental Conservation Endangered Species Unit (beginning in 1976) generally uncovered only a few shells or living animals during annual trips, although an intensive search in July 1981, with Grimm's assistance, yielded 18 live individuals.

Past surveys are suspect, as Grimm (1981) and Hubricht (1985) no longer believe that Novisuccinea ovalis even occurs in Novisuccinea chittenangoensis habitat at Chittenango Falls. They surmise, rather, that earlier reported specimens of Novisuccinea ovalis were instead immature Novisuccinea chittenangoensis. However, a review of photographic records showed shells of Novisuccinea ovalis that were collected at the Falls when the type specimens of Novisuccinea chittenangoensis were collected. Apparently, Novisuccinea ovalis occurred at or near the Falls historically but is no longer encountered there or is only located in adjacent habitats. Therefore, relative comparisons between the two species' abundance is problematic and confusing.

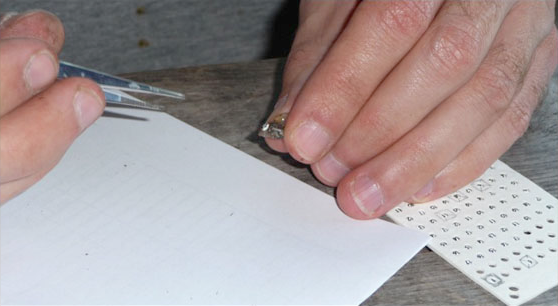
A biologist is marking a snail to aid in the process of monitoring the population.

During the summer of 1982, Aloi and Ringler conducted a mark and recapture study in the patch of watercress where the snails appeared most densely. Using two methods (Jolly and Schnabel) and two models, they estimated a population of about 300 snails with a density of four snails per square meter of watercress habitat. These snails have subsequently been identified as Succinea sp. B, not Novisuccinea chittenangoensis. A 1983 collection of 83 snails for use in electrophoretic studies resulted in removal of 24 Novisuccinea chittenangoensis from the population; unfortunately, their identity was not verified at the time of collection, on top of which Novisuccinea chittenangoensis was thought to be more abundant than it actually was. The population of Succinea sp. B expanded rapidly to an estimate of more than 3,000 snails in 1984, whereas counts of Novisuccinea chittenangoensis in 1984 indicated the presence of approximately 100 adults. Counts of live Novisuccinea chittenangoensis from 1995 to 2001 yielded an average of five adults per survey with a high of 12 adults in 2001. and post-reproductive shell counts made at the end of each activity season from 1987 to 2001 generally identified 4 to 20 Novisuccinea chittenangoensis adults. Subsequent studies have shown that Succinea sp. B outnumbers Novisuccinea chittenangoensis by as much as 10 to 1 in the primary habitat areas.

In 2002, the NYSDEC, ESF, and the USFWS increased the survey effort and conducted a mark-release-recapture study at the Falls. Sixteen surveys were conducted during the study period between July and October 2002. The final population estimate using the Schumacher-Eschmeyer method was 183 individuals (95 percent C.I.: 145–222 individuals). Population size was also estimated on the basis of capture frequencies, with a final estimate of 206 individuals. Due to differences in survey intensity and questionable species identifications in years past, the validity and comparability of survey data over the 20-year period do not provide a sound basis for any accurate status statement. The protocol for the mark-release-recapture study was modified slightly and continued in 2003, 2004, and 2005. The Novisuccinea chittenangoensis population was estimated to be 178 in 2003 and 680 in 2004. Preliminary 2005 survey results show a population slightly larger than the 2004 estimate.

In addition to the wild population at Chittenango Falls State Park, efforts to establish captive populations began in 1990. A captive Novisuccinea chittenangoensis colony was being maintained at the Rosamond Gifford Zoo in Syracuse, New York, however, the last remaining snails died in November 2002. Other unsuccessful breeding programs were tried in the 1990s: at ESF at Syracuse; at the Wildlife Conservation Park/Bronx Zoo; an early effort at the Rosamond Gifford Zoo (then called the Burnet Park Zoo); at the Seneca Park Zoo (Rochester, New York); and at the Buffalo Zoo. Further experiments are necessary in order to determine what the proper conditions are for maintaining a healthy captive population of Novisuccinea chittenangoensis.

== Conservation ==
Novisuccinea chittenangoensis was originally proposed as a Federal endangered species in April 1976 (41 FR 17742-17747), owing to an apparent decline in the species' population coupled with its extremely limited range. Ultimately, however, the species was listed as threatened in July 1978 (43 FR 28932-28935) because of the presumed existence of a second colony in Tennessee and North Carolina. After listing, it was determined that the Tennessee/North Carolina snails were not Novisuccinea chittenangoensis, and the Chittenango Falls colony remains the only known population of this species. In 1977, the New York State Department of Environmental Conservation (NYSDEC) amended the "List of Endangered, Threatened and Special Concern Fish & Wildlife Species of New York State" to include Novisuccinea chittenangoensis as an endangered species in New York. NatureServe considers it a critically imperiled species.

Approximately 57,000 visitors come to the park each year for a variety of outdoor recreational activities. The 1978 final rule listing Novisuccinea chittenangoensis as threatened estimated that 60 percent of the habitat at Chittenango Falls was trampled by humans. Human disturbance also continues to threaten Novisuccinea chittenangoensis, although this has been greatly minimized by fencing of the snail's habitat area at Chittenango Falls. The current strategy for recovering Novisuccinea chittenangoensis includes buffering the species against extinction by perpetuating the extant population at Chittenango Falls at a baseline size, and new attempts in maintaining multiple captive populations.
