= St. Patrick's Church (Syracuse, New York) =

Historic church in New York, United States

- St. Patrick's Church Complex
- U.S. National Register of Historic Places
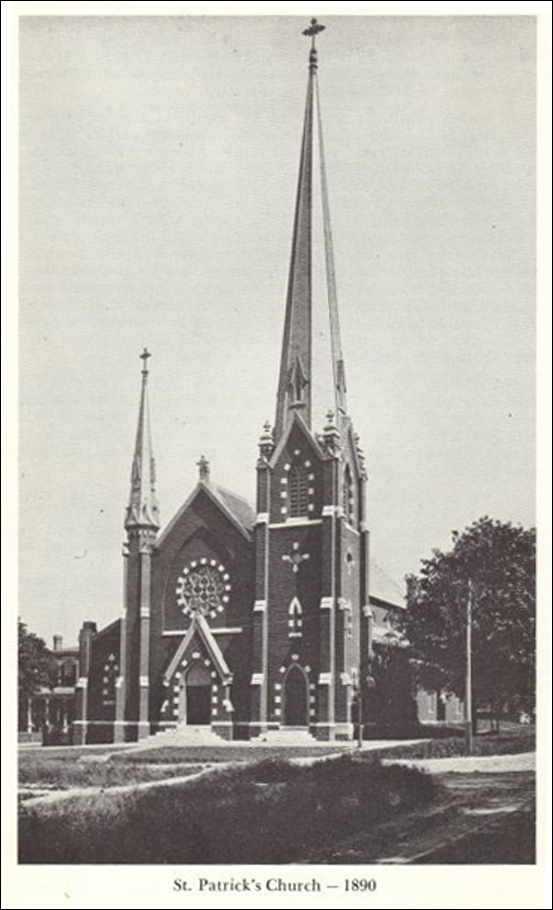
- St. Patrick's Church, c. 1890

- Location within New York Location within the United States
- Location: 216 N. Lowell Ave., Syracuse, New York
- Coordinates: 43°03′00″N 76°10′58″W
- Area: 2.87 acres (1.16 ha)
- Built: 1871-1872
- Architect: Nichols, Charles C.; Randall, James A.
- Architectural style: Gothic Revival
- Website: St. Patrick's and St. Brigid's
- NRHP reference No.: 12000480
- Added to NRHP: August 7, 2012

St. Patrick's Church Complex is a historic Roman Catholic church complex located in the Far Westside neighborhood of Syracuse, Onondaga County, New York. The complex consists of the church (1871–1872), rectory (1890), school and convent (1909), additions (1930), and shrine in the meditation garden (1959). The church is a one-story, Gothic Revival style brick building measuring 60 feet wide and 128 feet long. It has a basilica plan and features towers of uneven height and weight flanking a central front gable.

It was listed on the National Register of Historic Places in 2012.

== History ==
St. Patrick's Church was founded in 1870 and is located in historic Tipperary Hill on the west side of Syracuse. The church was dedicated on September 15, 1872, by Bishop Francis McNerny of the Albany Diocese.

Many of the first parishioners arrived in 1825 from all the various counties in Ireland to work on the Erie Canal and settled in Tipperary Hill. The first mass was celebrated on July 31, 1870, by Rev. Hugh Shields, the first pastor, in Cool's Hall, located at 101 Hamilton Street, on the banks of the Erie Canal. There is an annual Irish Festival.

== Today ==
During the summer of 2012, St. Patrick's was canonically linked with St. Brigid's church, which means that they are still separate parishes, but share a pastor.
