= Far Westside, Syracuse =

Far Westside
- Neighborhood
- Location in New York State Location in the United States
- Coordinates: 43.0494°N 76.1886°W
- Country: United States
- State: New York
- County: Onondaga
- City: Syracuse
- Annexed from Geddes, New York: 1886

Population (2000)
  - Total: 6,916
- Time zone: UTC-5 (Eastern Time)
  - Summer (DST): UTC-4 (Eastern Daylight Time)
- ZIP code: 13204

The Syracuse Far Westside is one of 26 neighborhoods recognized by the City of Syracuse, New York. Until this area joined the city in 1886 it was known as the Village of Geddes.

== History ==
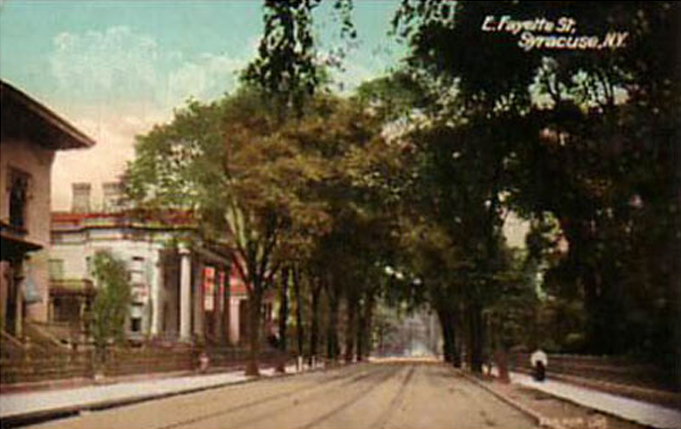
West Fayette Street c.1900

The Syracuse Far Westside is bounded by Erie Blvd West on the northeast, South Geddes Street on the lower east and Rowland Street on the south. The western border runs from Velasko Road in the south, to South Avery Avenue, Salisbury Road, Myrtle Street and parallel to Charles Avenue in Westvale, a section of Geddes ending at Willis Avenue just south of Onondaga Lake at the railroad tracks.

=== Annexation ===
In 1886 the village of Geddes was the largest community in the town of Geddes with many homes and businesses. Geddes officially became a town in 1848. "It then included the west side of Syracuse to Geddes Street, which was the eastern boundary of the town."

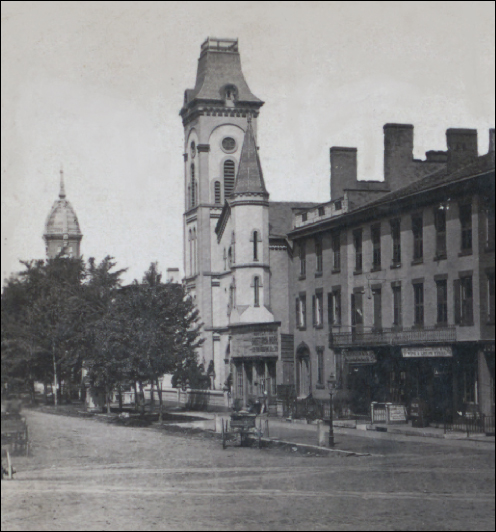
The old town square, 1624 West Genesee Street, Village of Geddes, circa 1875. By Robert N. Dennis

Local residents voted to join the city because Syracuse had a paid professional police department, a paid professional fire department and the city was about to obtain an excellent water supply from Skaneateles Lake.

The village of Geddes was annexed by Syracuse on May 20, 1886. "In one day, Geddes lost its town hall, town supervisor, town clerk, town justice, most town board members and three-quarters of its population." The residents in the area encouraged the annexation. Twice, entire commercial blocks along Furnace Street (now West Fayette Street) burned to the ground for lack of water and fire protection.

== Landmarks ==
When the village of Geddes joined the city in 1886, Major John P. Burnet, who owned a large farm on Tipperary Hill, gave a large hill top plot of land to Syracuse now known as Burnet Park with the condition that the city spend $6,000 to build roads and plant trees in this new city park. Burnet was satisfied with the city's efforts, and thus, in 1887, gave the city an additional plot of land, known as the Oak Grove, which is still full of oak trees, on the corner of South Avery Avenue and Whittier Avenue.

The Far Westside includes Tipperary Hill, an Irish neighborhood that is known for its upside-down traffic signal. Additionally, Burnet Park and the Rosamond Gifford Zoo are within its limits.

The St. Patrick's Church Complex was listed on the National Register of Historic Places in 2012. In 1825, the initial members of the parish came from different counties in Ireland to labor on the Erie Canal and established themselves in Tipperary Hill. The inaugural mass was conducted on July 31, 1870, by Rev. Hugh Shields, the parish's first pastor, at Cool's Hall, situated at 101 Hamilton Street, alongside the Erie Canal.

== Demographics ==
44 percent of housing in the neighborhood is owner-occupied, close to the citywide average. As of the 2000 census, 6,916 people lived in the Far Westside. 91.3% were White, 8.7% other. 51.9% were female, 48.1% male. The median age was 34.2, and the median household income was $28,006. Registered voters are 38% Democrat, 28% Republican, 26% non-enrolled, and 8% percent other.
