= Burnet Park =

Park in New York, USA

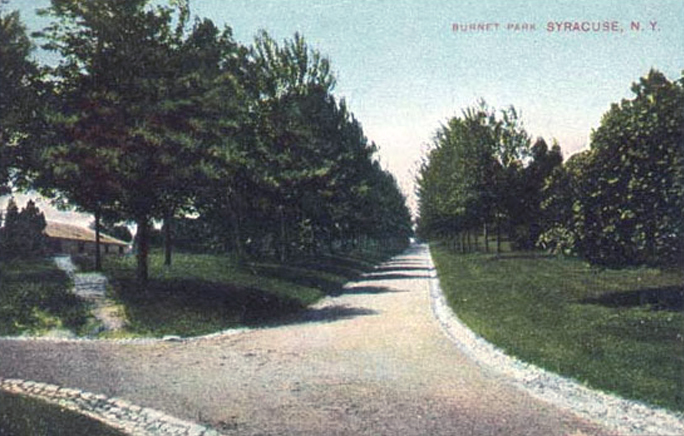
- Burnet Park c.1910
- Interactive map of Burnet Park
- Location: Bounded by Grand Ave. on south, S. Avery Ave. on west, Coleridge Ave. on north and Wilbur Ave. on east Syracuse, NY
- Coordinates: 43°2′26″N 76°11′4″W
- Area: 88 acres (36 ha)
- Created: 1886

Burnet Park is the largest park in Syracuse, New York, USA, covering an area of 88 acres (36 ha). It is located on the west end of the city, in the Far Westside in a neighborhood called Tipperary Hill.

== History ==
Burnet Park is located on the Far Westside in Tipperary Hill and is bounded by Coleridge Avenue on the north, South Avery Avenue on the west, South Wilbur Avenue on the east and Grand Avenue on the south.

=== Geddes annexation ===
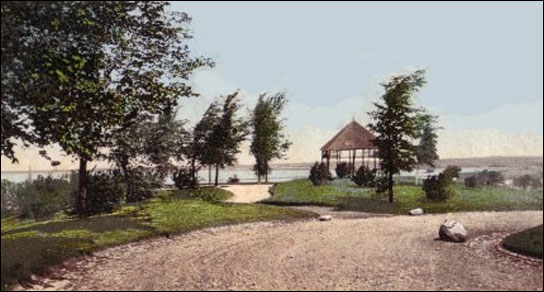
Burnet Park c.1905

When the village of Geddes joined the city in 1886, Major John P. Burnet, who owned a large farm on Tipperary Hill, donated a 100-acre (0.40 km^{2}) hill top plot to Syracuse now known as Burnet Park for use as a city park. The property was donated with the condition that the city spend $6,000 to build roads and plant trees.

A year later, Burnet was satisfied with the city's efforts, and thus, in 1887, gave the city an additional plot of land, known as the Oak Grove, which is still full of oak trees, on the corner of South Avery Avenue and Whittier Avenue.

=== Burnet Park extension ===
In 1890, Burnet subdivided the remainder of his farm south of the park into residential lots and called the development the Burnet Park Extension. The plans for the "extension" were drawn up by native Syracusian architect Charles Colson, who also designed Syracuse's new City Hall which opened in 1892. The extensions' streets reportedly were named by a state worker from Binghamton.The subdivision offered 100 lots and advertised the close proximity of Burnet Park as one of the main amenities. It was advertised by Burnet & Westcott, of 10 Snow Building in Syracuse as "the most beautiful building lots for residences in the city of Syracuse."

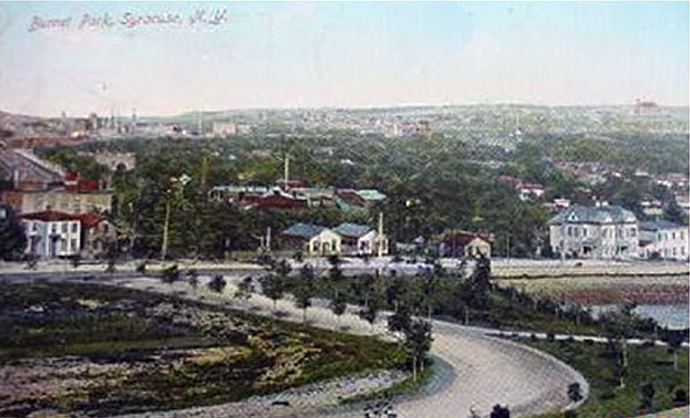
Burnet Park looking east toward downtown c.1910

=== Park facilities ===
The park affords residents from the local area the ability to participate in many activities. The facilities at the park include: three softball fields, a basketball court, an outdoor racquetball court, two tennis courts, a 50 m swimming pool, a nine-hole par-three golf course, and the Rosamond Gifford Zoo. Most of the park is free to the public, excepting the golf course and zoo.

==== Golf course ====
The Burnet Park golf course is one of the oldest in the country, having been constructed in 1901.

The golf course is located at the corner of Avery and Coleridge Avenues. It is located at the city's highest point of elevation.

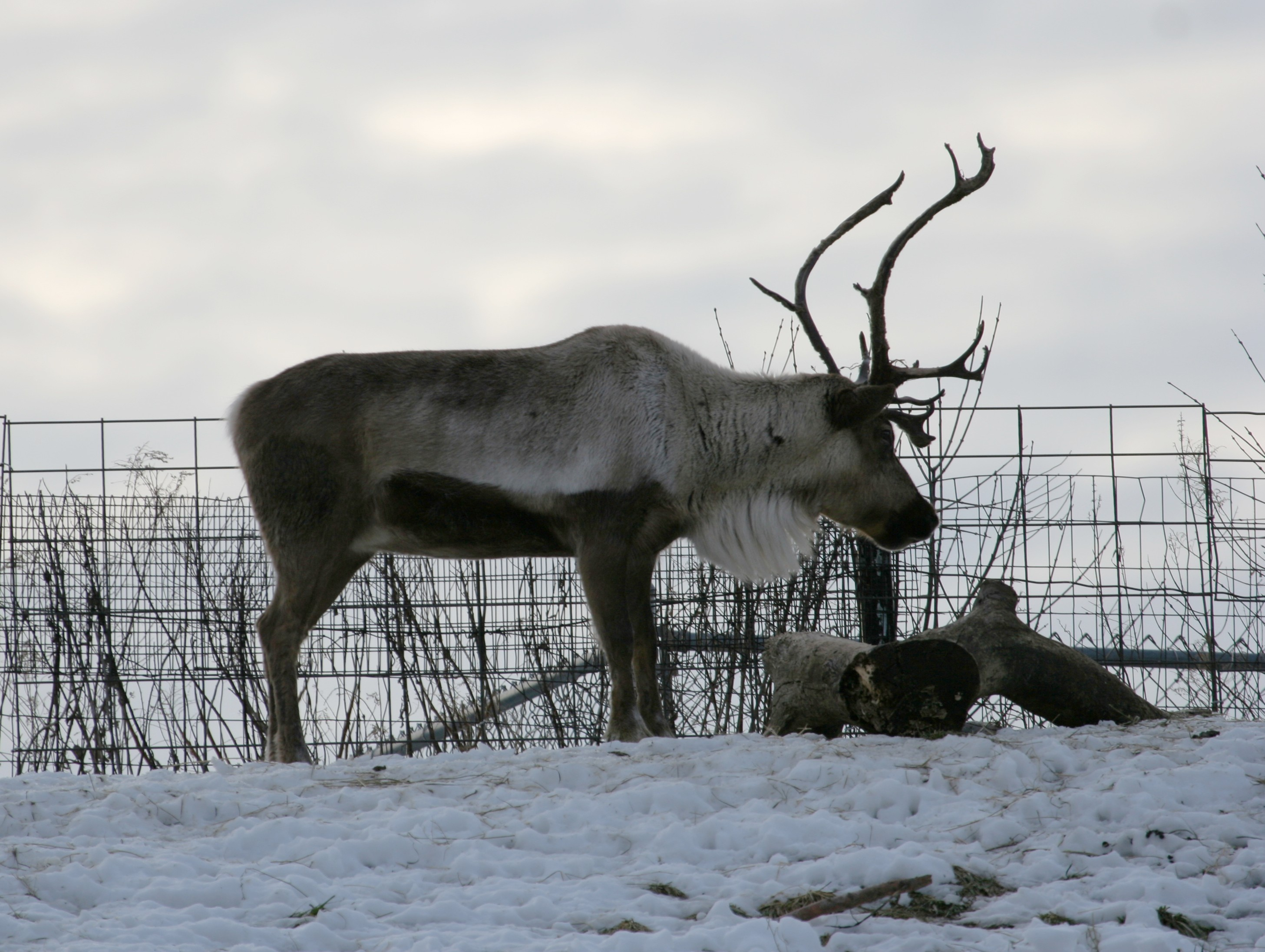
Reindeer (Rangifer tarandus at Rosamond Gifford Zoo)

The first hole features the country's only “shamrock” shaped bunker. The course has undergone several changes since it opened over 100 years ago. The latest upgrade occurred in 1988 when a complete renovation took place.

==== Burnet zoo ====
The Rosamond Gifford Zoo is a zoo in Syracuse located in Burnet Park. During the early years, the zoo was owned and operated by Syracuse, however, it is now owned and operated by Onondaga County Parks.

The zoo is home to nearly 1,000 animals on 43 acres (170,000 m^{2}). Some of the more popular animals include Asian elephants, Humboldt penguins, Amur tigers and African lions. The zoo also houses a conservation, education center, Jungle Cafe and gift shop.

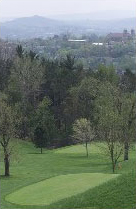
Burnet Park - George Washington Memorial Park, 2000

==== George Washington Memorial forest ====
In July 1935, the local newspaper reported that the George Washington Memorial Forest, which comprised several thousand evergreens along the southern border of Burnet Park at Grand Avenue, would afford nursery stock for park use over the years as the growth was thinned. At that time, the trees were between one and two feet in height.

It was estimated that it would take 30 or 40 years (1965–1975) before the saplings formed a wooded area. The trees were donated to the city by New York State through the Experimental Station of the College of Agriculture. By the mid-1960s, the forest had grown, as estimated, to a full stand.

The forest is located south of the golf course on the southern border of the park on Grand Avenue.

==== Summer sports ====
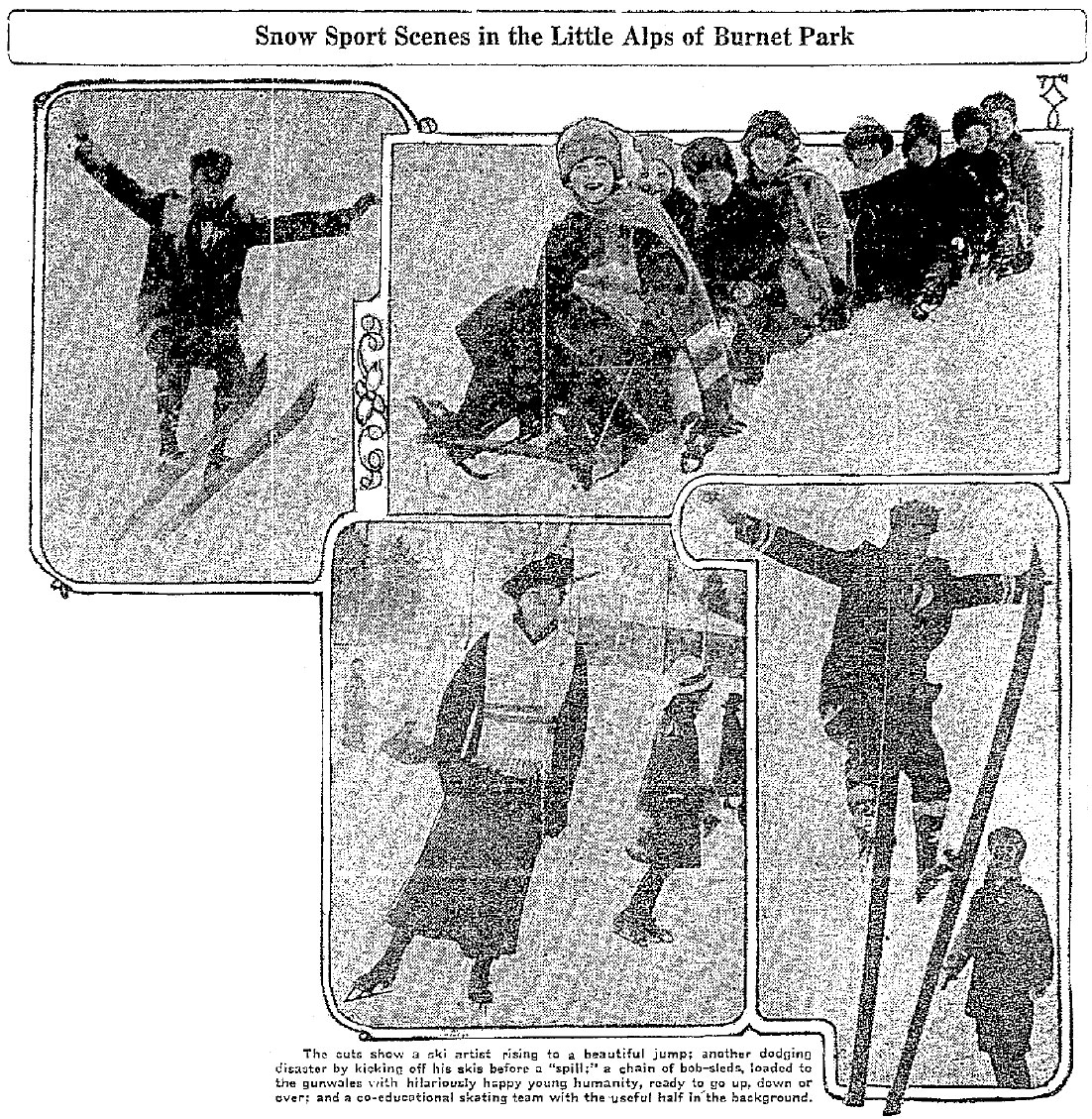
Burnet Park winter sports in January, 1917

The park is filled with activity no matter the season. In the summer months there are activities such as softball games, golf and swimming. Local residents use the park for bicycling, jogging and walking. On windy days, a good place to fly a kite is the local Lover's Lane on the western edge of the park, atop a hill next to South Avery Avenue.

The handball courts were built in the early 1970s and have been a popular activity for many years. The picnic grounds located in Oak Grove on the northwest corner of the park were a good place for family get-together's.

==== Winter sports ====
Buffalo Hill has always been a favorite spot for winter sports enthusiasts to use their sleds and toboggans. By January 1917, sledding and skiing were favorite pastimes and the hill was called The Little Alps.

Ice-skating was also a popular choice of activity throughout the years. The ice-skating rink was constructed in January each year. A small snowplow would form a circle with tall snowbanks around the edge and park staff would use a fire hose to fill the pad with several inches of water. The process would take 24 hours until the ice finally froze. During the mid-1960s, the city built a plumbed outdoor ice-skating rink next to the clubhouse facility. The rink is now defunct and was closed in 2003 due to the opening of a new ice-skating rink in the downtown area.

The old rink at Burnet Park is still used for broomball and roller hockey in the summer months, but is closed to the general public.
