= Tipperary Hill Heritage Memorial =

- City of Syracuse
- The Tipperary Hill Heritage Memorial
- For early citizens who won the battle of the "Green over Red" traffic light
- Unveiled: 1997
- Location: 43°02′48″N 76°11′08″W in Syracuse, New York

The Tipperary Hill Heritage Memorial, dedicated in 1997, is located on Tipperary Hill in Syracuse, New York. The memorial was erected in honor of early citizens who, in the opinion of local residents, were brave sons of Ireland who stood up to City Hall and won the battle of the "Green over Red" traffic light.

The memorial features bronze, life-size figures of a 1930s Irish immigrant family and was sculpted by Dexter Benedict of Penn Yan, New York. The father is pointing out the traffic light to his wife, daughter and son who has a sling shot in his back pocket, hinting that he might know a little bit of the history of the light.

The memorial is located in Tipperary Hill Memorial Park which was originally the site of a commercial building that held a prominent position on the northeast corner of Milton Avenue and Tompkins Street and was later demolished. It is the newest city park in Syracuse.

== History ==
When the city first installed traffic signals in 1925, they placed one at a major intersection on Tipperary Hill, in the center of the neighborhood business district, located on the corner of Tompkins Street and Milton Avenue.

=== Stone throwers ===
The Stone Throwers were several youths from the neighborhood who were among some of the original residents who rallied against the addition of the new traffic light on Tipperary Hill because it sported the British "red" prominently placed over the Irish "green". Due to strong national rivalries, the traditional "red-over-green" lights were interpreted as symbols of England over Ireland and offended the youths of the close-knit Irish neighborhood.

The youths, aged 11 to 17, included John "Jacko" Behan (born 1909), Richard "Richie" Britt (born 1908), James M. "Duke" Coffey (born 1910), Kenneth "Kenny" Davis (born 1914), George Dorsey, Gerald "Mikis" Murphy (born 1914), Francis "Stubbs" Shortt (born 1908), and Eugene Thompson (1911-2001).

Patrick "Packy" Corbett (born 1909), former Onondaga County Sheriff, was named honorary member of the group after growing up on Tipp Hill, however, would not acknowledge vandalizing the traffic light.

By 1925, the city was divided into north, east, west, and south side ethnic neighborhoods. According to one of the Stone Throwers, "if you were Irish, you stayed in the Westend."

The youths gathered up stones which they called "Irish confetti" and "took aim at the red lenses, managing to put the signal out of commission," an act they performed many times. Eventually, neighborhood leaders, led by Tipp Hill alderman, John J. "Huckle" Ryan and a number of local businessmen persuaded the city fathers to install a green-over-red traffic signal, the only one of its kind in the U.S. and it has been that way ever since.

=== Establishment of memorial ===
In 1997, local residents of Irish ancestry and business owners, including Peter Coleman, gathered resources and encouraged the city to demolish an old commercial building, to build a small park and erect the Tipperary Hill Heritage Memorial.

In a fund raising effort, Coleman, a saloonkeeper for over 50 years and owner of Coleman's Authentic Irish Pub at 100 South Lowell Avenue, also sold commemorative bricks engraved with the names of loved ones for $75 each which were set around the base of the statue. There were a total of 450 installed.

Jerry Wilson, a local jewelry store owner, was also instrumental in the establishment of the memorial park. On March 17, 1995, he helped Coleman raise $6,000 for the statue and the two planned a fund raiser "among pubs on The Hill."
