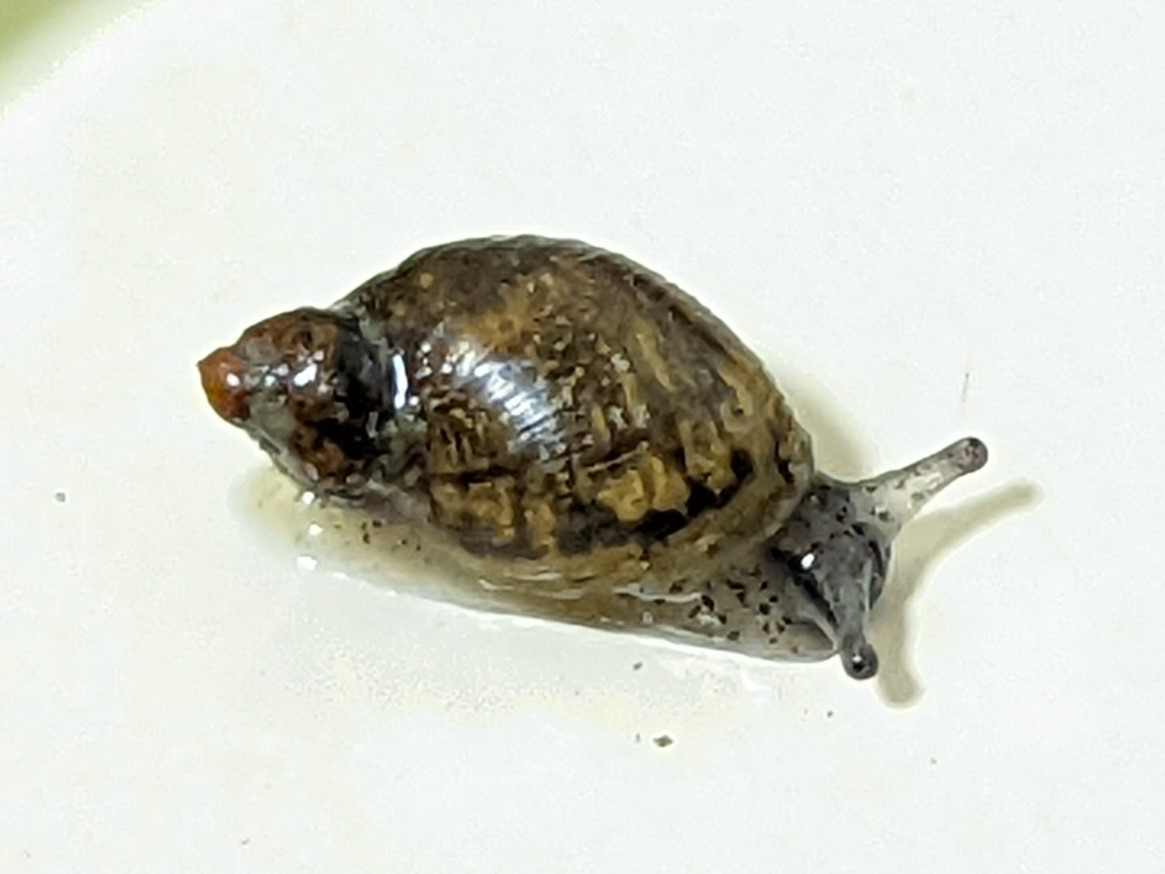
- Novisuccinea lyrata

Scientific classification
- Kingdom: Animalia
- Phylum: Mollusca
- Class: Gastropoda
- Order: Stylommatophora
- Family: Succineidae
- Subfamily: Succineinae
- Genus: Novisuccinea; Pilsbry, 1948

Synonyms
- Succinea (Novisuccinea) Schileyko & I. M. Likharev, 1986

= Novisuccinea =

Genus of gastropods

Novisuccinea is a genus of air-breathing land snails, terrestrial pulmonate gastropod mollusks in the family Succineidae, the ambersnails.

== Species ==
The following species are recognised in the genus Novisuccinea:

- Novisuccinea altaica (E. von Martens, 1871)
- Novisuccinea chittenangoensis (Pilsbry, 1908) - Chittenango ovate amber snail (Madison County, New York)
- Novisuccinea diserta Schileyko & I. M. Likharev, 1986
- Novisuccinea evoluta (E. von Martens, 1879)
- Novisuccinea lyrata (A. Gould, 1859)
- Novisuccinea martensiana (G. Nevill, 1878)
- Novisuccinea ovalis (Say, 1817) - oval ambersnail (eastern and central North America)
- Novisuccinea pennsylvanica (Pilsbry, 1948)
- Novisuccinea strigata (L. Pfeiffer, 1855) - striate ambersnail (north-western North America)

== Gallery ==
=== Novisuccinea chittenagoensis ===
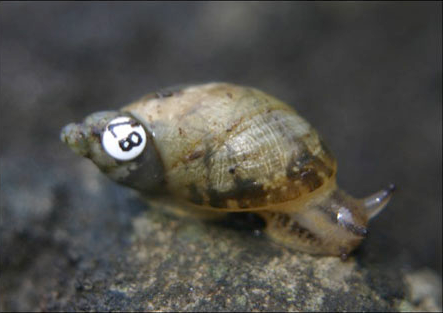
Live individual

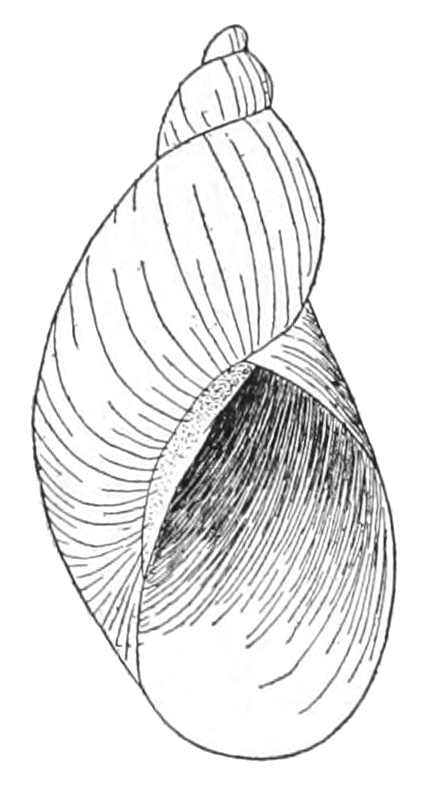
Illustration of shell

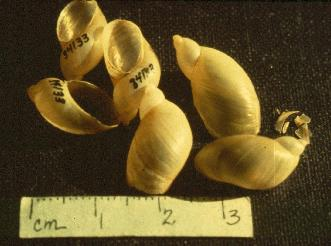
Several shells

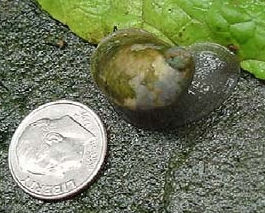
With dime for scale

=== Novisuccinea lyrata ===
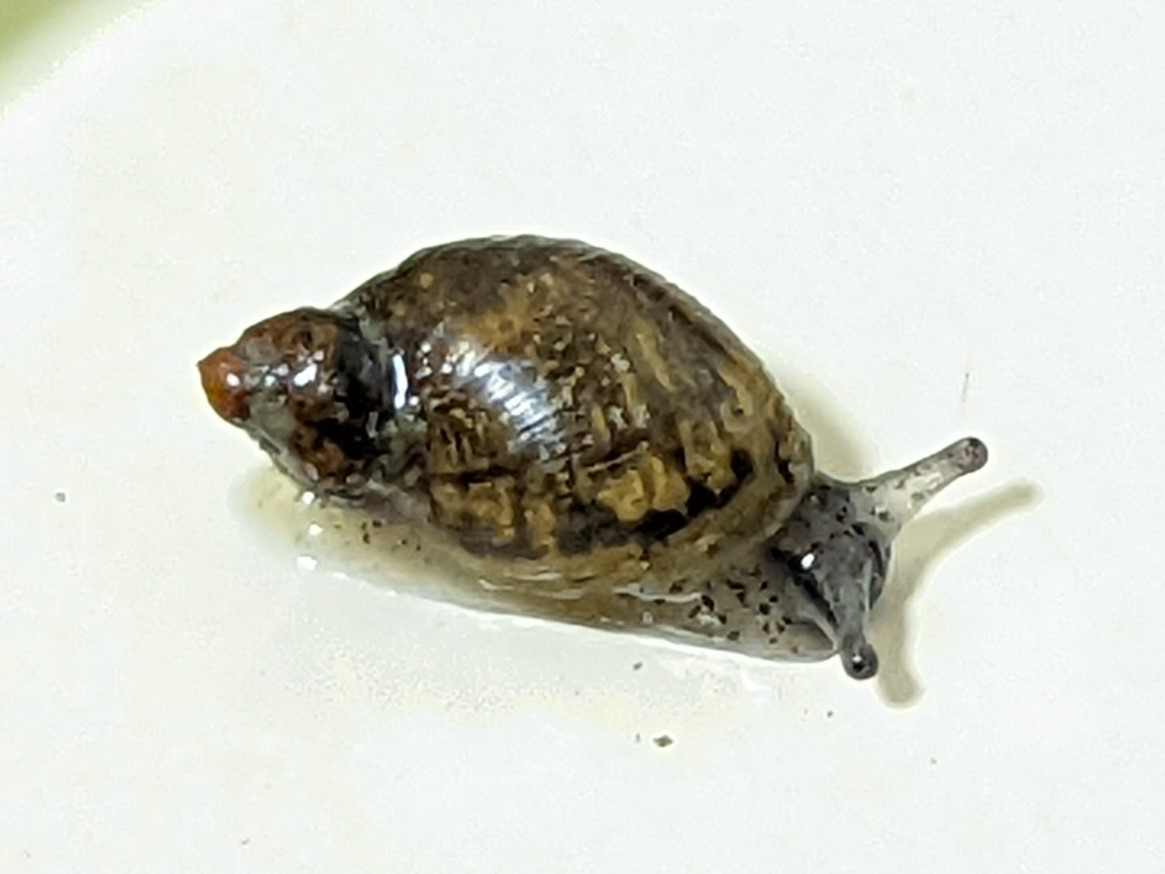
Live individual

=== Novisuccinea ovalis ===
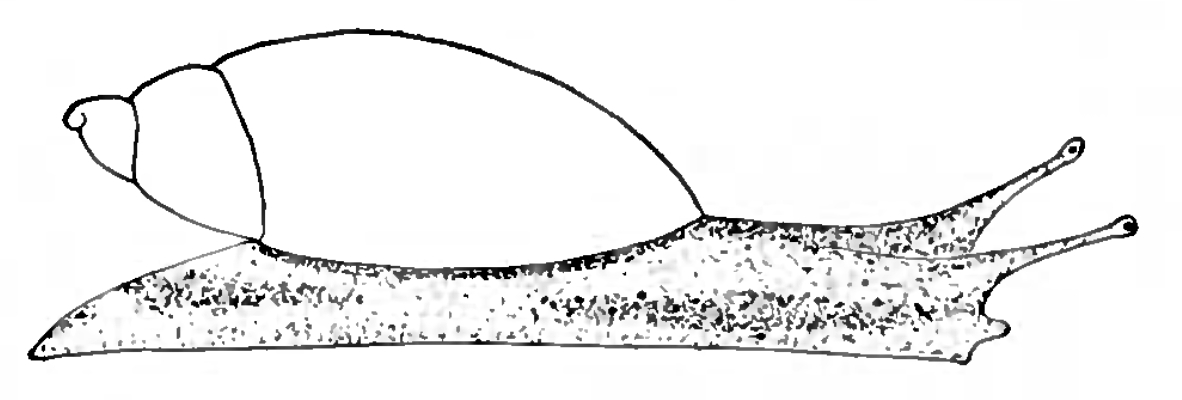
Illustration of live individual

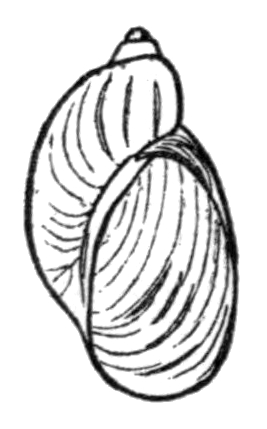
Illustration of shell
