= Rosamond Gifford Zoo =

- Rosamond Gifford Zoo logo

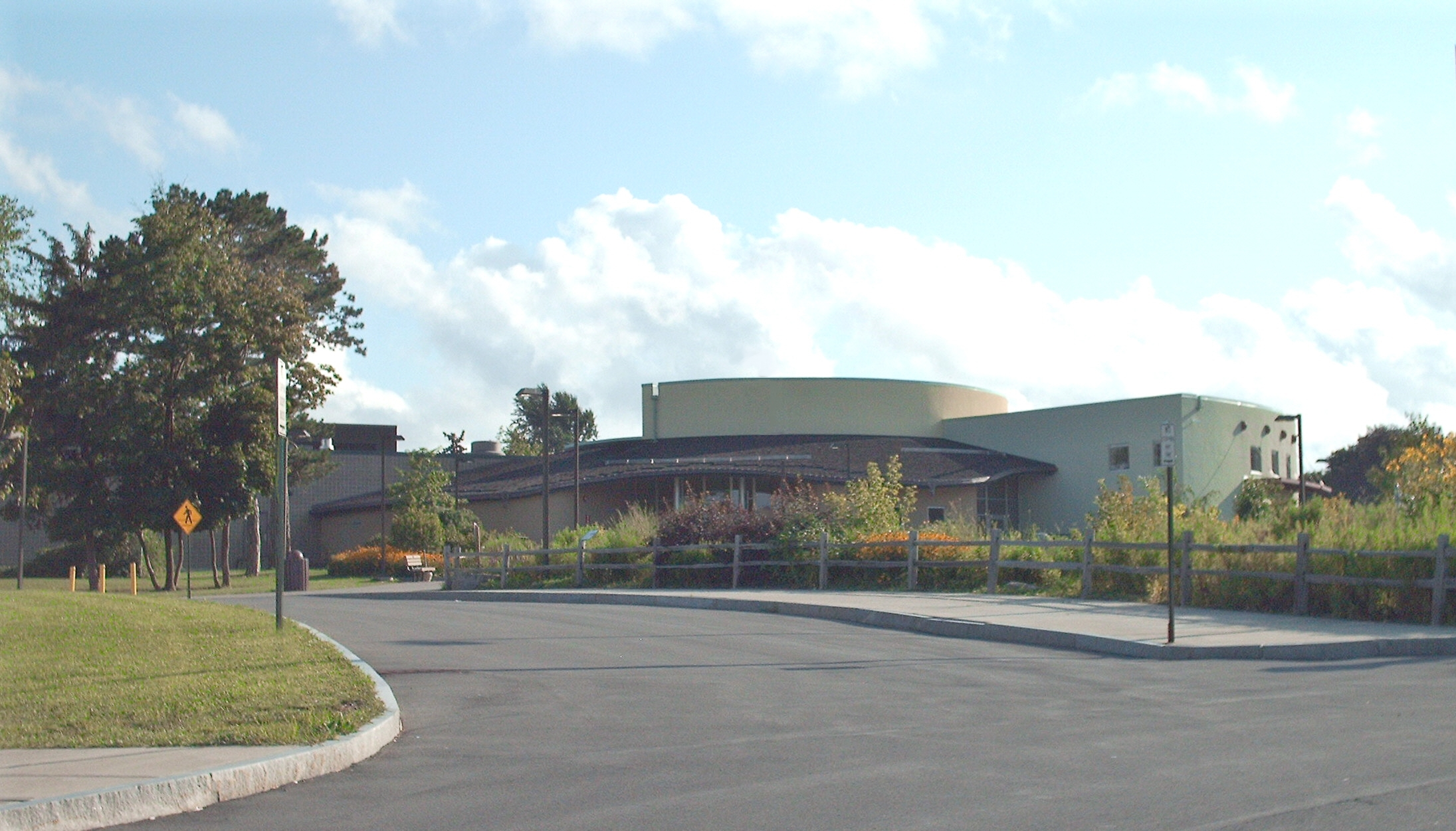
- Main building and entrance to the zoo
- Interactive map of Rosamond Gifford Zoo
- 43°02′32″N 76°10′52″W
- Date opened: 1914; 1986
- Location: Syracuse, New York, United States
- Land area: 43 acres (17 ha)
- No. of animals: 1300+
- No. of species: ~300
- Memberships: AZA
- Website: www.rosamondgiffordzoo.org

The Rosamond Gifford Zoo at Burnet Park is an AZA (Association of Zoos & Aquariums) zoo in Syracuse, New York. It is owned and operated by Onondaga County Parks with support from the Friends of the Rosamond Gifford Zoo. The zoo is home to more than 1300 animals representing nearly 300 species on 43 acres (17 ha). Some of the more popular animals include Asian elephants, Humboldt penguins, Amur tigers, and a Komodo dragon. The zoo opened a new Animal Health Center in 2022 that is the largest zoological medical center in New York state outside of the Bronx Zoo.

The Rosamond Gifford Zoo has been a continuously accredited member of the Association of Zoos and Aquariums (AZA) since 1987.

== History ==
=== Origins ===
In 1900, Lyman Cornelius Smith donated $10,000 and zoological collection to establish a zoo. The first incarnation of the zoo was a small, four acre facility in Burnet Park owned and operated by the Syracuse Department of Parks and Recreation. After opening in 1914, the zoo's first expansion began in 1916 with the construction of stone exhibits for bears and a waterfowl pond. By 1933, the zoo had doubled in size, and by in 1955 a children's zoo and monkey exhibit had been built.

Decline

The zoo's decline began in the early 1960s as Syracuse's tax base started to shrink and financial support for the zoo began to erode. In 1974, two teens broke into the zoo and killed and injured several animals. The city's financial position and the break-in fueled public debate over the future of the zoo.

In 1970, a volunteer group founded the Friends of the Burnet Park Zoo and the city received a grant to enlarge the zoo to 18 acres (7.3 ha), add a boardwalk, a western plains habitat, and construct a new perimeter fence. In 1979, the city of Syracuse transferred control of the zoo to Onondaga County Parks to determine its future.

Renewal

A study by County Parks staff produced a forty-page renovation plan for the zoo which involved shutting down the old zoo and constructing a new zoo with spacious, naturalistic animal habitats replacing the old cages. The plan was approved by the Onondaga County legislature in 1981. The old zoo was closed in 1982 and the $13 million project ($10 million of which was provided by the county and the rest by the Friends of the Burnet Park Zoo) began in 1983.

The zoo reopened in 1986 and received its first accreditation from the Association of Zoos and Aquariums the following year; it has been reaccredited every five years since. In 1998, the zoo initiated a capital campaign to fund its education classrooms as well as the Amur tiger and Diversity of Birds exhibits. Following a $2 million endowment by the Rosamond Gifford Charitable Corporation in 1999, the zoo was renamed the Rosamond Gifford Zoo at Burnet Park.

The next several years saw the construction of a Humboldt penguin exhibit, Penguin Coast, which was completed in 2005 and features a breeding colony of Humboldt penguins. Since then, the zoo has successfully hatched more than 55 penguin chicks as part of the Species Survival Plan for Humboldt penguins. Since 2010, the Friends of the Zoo has assisted the zoo with capital campaigns to construct Primate Park, an outdoor exhibit where siamang apes, Colobus monkeys and patas monkeys rotate on exhibit in warm weather; the Helga Beck Asian Elephant Preserve, a nearly 7-acre preserve for the zoo's Asian elephant herd; and the Zalie and Bob Linn Amur Leopard Woodland, home to the world's most critically endangered big cats.

== Exhibits ==
U.S.S. Antiquities cave

The U.S.S. Antiquities cave is an exhibit that simulates a submarine voyage through time from life's earliest days in the ocean to creatures living on land. Exhibits range in size and include insects, freshwater and marine life, reptiles, and amphibians. Fish species include tomato clownfish, common clownfish, Fairy basslet, Copperband butterflyfish, Green-spotted Pufferfish, Freckled porcupinefish, splended garden eels, lookdown, hippo tang, longhorn cowfish, banded archerfish, starfish and anemones. Amphibian species include poison dart frogs and Panamanian golden frogs, which are considered extinct in the wild. Reptiles species include Gila monsters, northern caiman lizards, yellow-spotted Amazon river turtles, and massasaugas.

Adaptations of Animals

The Adaptations of Animals wing features animals that have evolved unique adaptations to help them survive in their native habitats. The Nocturnal Animals area is on a reverse light cycle to allow visitors to see animals that are active at night, including Hoffmann's two-toed sloths, Fennec foxes, southern tamanduas, North American river otters, Damaraland mole-rats, Mohol bushbabies and a North Island brown kiwi.

Diversity of Birds aviary

The Diversity of Birds aviary is a large free-flight space that simulates a rainforest habitat featuring warm-weather birds from around the world, including Roseate spoonbills, Pin-tailed whydah, Violet Turacos, Waldrapp ibis, Inca terns, Luzon bleeding-hearts, Nicobar pigeons, Hadada ibis, and others.

Social Animals Building

This building is home to animals that live in social groups and includes Amur leopards, Cape porcupines, North American porcupines, Golden lion tamarins, Black-and-white ruffed lemurs, Meerkats, and the winter quarters for the zoo's Komodo dragon. The zoo has had recent success with breeding common patas monkeys and in 2020 became the first known zoo in North America to hand-raise an infant patas monkey after the mother died giving birth.

Outdoor Birds

The zoo's large Waterfowl Pond showcases many aquatic birds including a flock of Chilean flamingos, Hooded mergansers, Common goldeneye, Ross's geese, Wood ducks, Cuban whistling ducks and many more. Nearby exhibits feature Pied crows, Red-billed blue magpie, Turkey vulture, Barred owl, a Eurasian eagle-owl, Red-tailed hawks, and several other species of raptors.

Wildlife Trail

The Wildlife Trail is a 0.5-mile (0.8 km) trail that takes visitors past animals such as Blue cranes, Red river hogs, Turkmenian markhor, Amur tigers, Red wolf, Thorold's deer, Red pandas, Humboldt penguins, Andean bears, Steller's sea eagles, Gray wolves, Snow leopard, Reeve's muntjacs, and Bactrian camels.

Helga Beck Asian Elephant Preserve

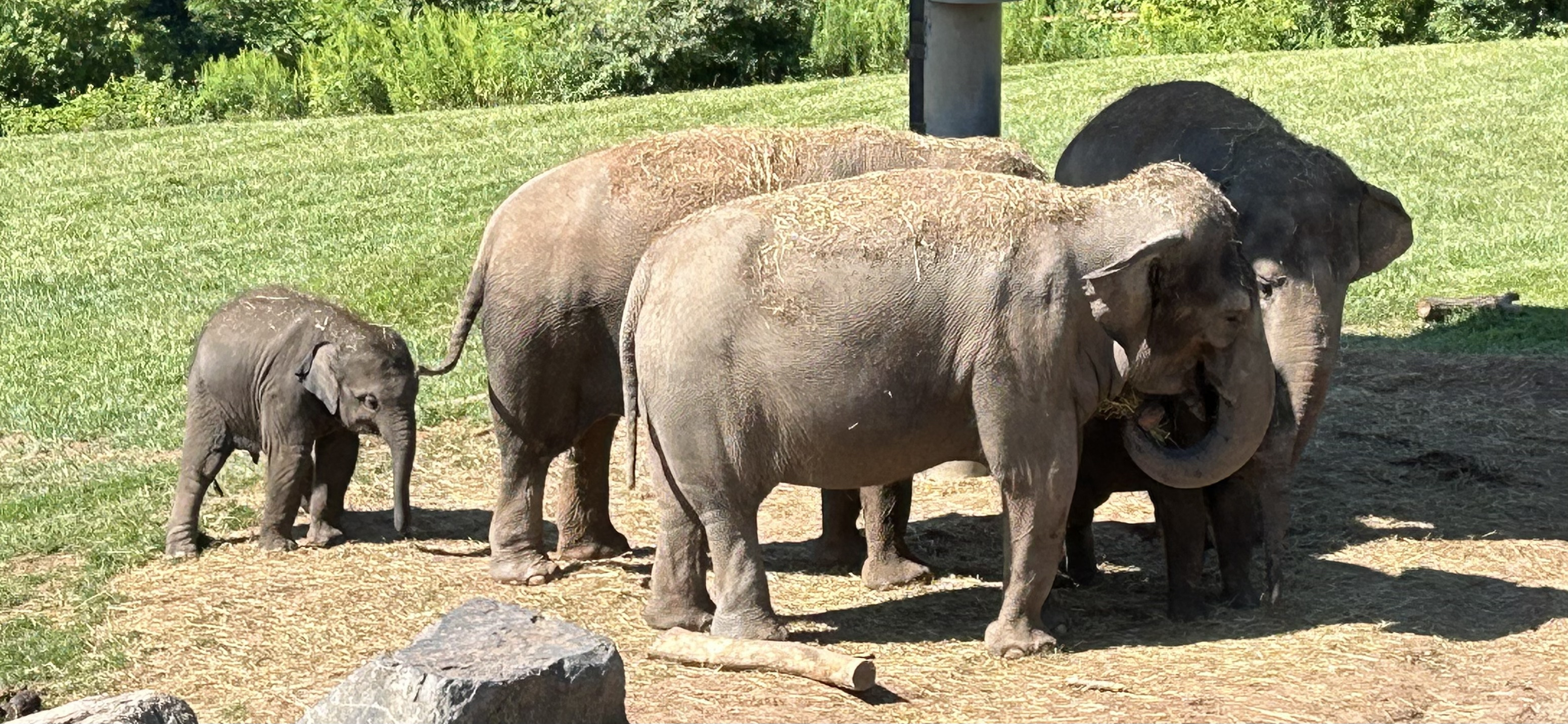
Rosamond Gifford Zoo Elephants

In December 2007, the Onondaga County Legislature approved a $6 million expansion of the Asian elephant exhibit to enable the elephant breeding program to grow in the future. Asian Elephant Preserve was completed in August 2011 and expanded twice since. The exhibit is home to the zoo's elephant herd and features about 7 acres of outdoor grounds and a husbandry building with room for up to 12 elephants.

The zoo cares for and breeds Asian elephants as part of the Species Survival Plan for this critically endangered species overseen by its accrediting organization, the Association of Zoos & Aquariums.

Domestic Animal Barn

The Domestic Animal Barn and yard are home to several endangered Heritage breeds of livestock including San Clemente Island goats, Black Welsh Mountain sheep and Barred Holland chickens, as well as a Guinea Hog, miniature Mediterranean donkey, two Alpacas and Barn owls.

Primate Park

Primate Park, which opened in 2010, is an outdoor exhibit with mesh walls, rope swings, large rocks and a waterfall feature. Siamangs, eastern black-and-white colobuses and common patas monkeys take turns in the outdoor space on a rotating basis in warm weather.

== Former exhibits ==
The zoo's Giant Pacific octopus exhibit was removed in 2024, after the death of Bambino the octopus. Bambino had been the only Giant Pacific octopus in Central New York.

== Conservation programs ==
As an accredited member of AZA, wildlife conservation is one of the primary missions of the Rosamond Gifford Zoo. The zoo participates in a number of programs to further conservation and animal welfare.

On-site programs

Species Survival Plans (SSPs) helps maintain a biodiverse population of threatened and endangered species in human care. Zoos around the world participate in SSPs by lending animals to other zoos to mate and produce genetically diverse offspring. The plans are managed using a breeding registry called a studbook. The Rosamond Gifford Zoo participates in SSPs for many threatened and endangered species including Amur tiger, Asian elephant, Amur leopard, snow leopard, red panda, black and white ruffed lemur, Humboldt penguin, red wolf, Turkmenian markhor and white-lipped deer, among others.

Research program

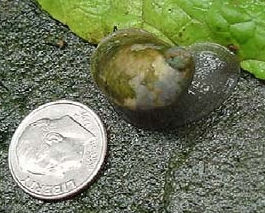
Chittenango Ovate Amber Snail (COAS), also called a "Chitt"

The Rosamond Gifford Zoo has teamed up with U.S. Fish and Wildlife Service, the New York State Department of Environmental Conservation, Seneca Park Zoo in Rochester, the New York State Office of Parks, Recreation and Historic Preservation, and SUNY College to help protect a tiny local snail, called Chittenango Ovate Amber Snail (COAS). It was discovered by a resident of Upstate New York and only exists in Chittenango Falls State Park. Research population surveys of COAS show only about 300 exist in the wild. The New York state has listed COAS as an endangered species. The zoo has established a COAS colony with a temperature-controlled terrarium that houses approximately 400 captive COAS. In recent years, dozens of captive-bred COAS have been released into their wild habitat.

Other conservation programs

Population Management Program (PMP) helps AZA-accredited zoos manage and conserve a select wild species population with voluntary cooperation of AZA-accredited zoos, aquariums, and other approved participants.

Taxon Advisory Groups (TAG) are composed of expert advisors who help to identify, manage and support AZA's cooperative animal management programs. They also serve as experts regarding the husbandry, veterinary care, conservation needs/challenges, research priorities, ethical considerations, and other issues pertaining to their taxa.

== Education programs ==
Rosamond Gifford Zoo offers many educational programs for a wide variety of visitors.

Zoo to You

This is a traveling education program that visits schools, libraries, community centers, senior centers/facilities, hospitals, etc., with professional zoo educators presenting classes featuring animal biofacts and ambassador animals including lizards, snakes, birds, turtles and a North American porcupine, among others. The purpose of this program is to increase awareness of the animal kingdom and encourage participants to be conscious about the environment.

Summer Zoo Camp

Summer Zoo Camps are weeklong summer sessions for specific age groups. Camps include zoo tours, hands-on activities, games, crafts and interactions with animals and staff at the zoo.

Seasonal camps

School Break Zoo Camps are held during school breaks to give children a chance to tour the zoo, see animals up close, play games, and make crafts for one day or all week.

EdVenture Academy

This program provides an opportunity for children and their parents to learn more about the animals at the zoo. Classes are designed for specific age groups and include crafts, snack, biofact (skulls, fur, feathers, etc.) presentations, zoo tours and animal encounters or keeper chats.

On-Site Educational Programs - Zoo Safari

Zoo Safari involves students in hands-on learning during field trips to the zoo's "living classroom."

== Adopt an Animal ==
Most of the animals at the Rosamond Gifford Zoo are available for symbolic adoption. The funds raised through the Adopt an Animal program support animal care and enrichment at the zoo.
