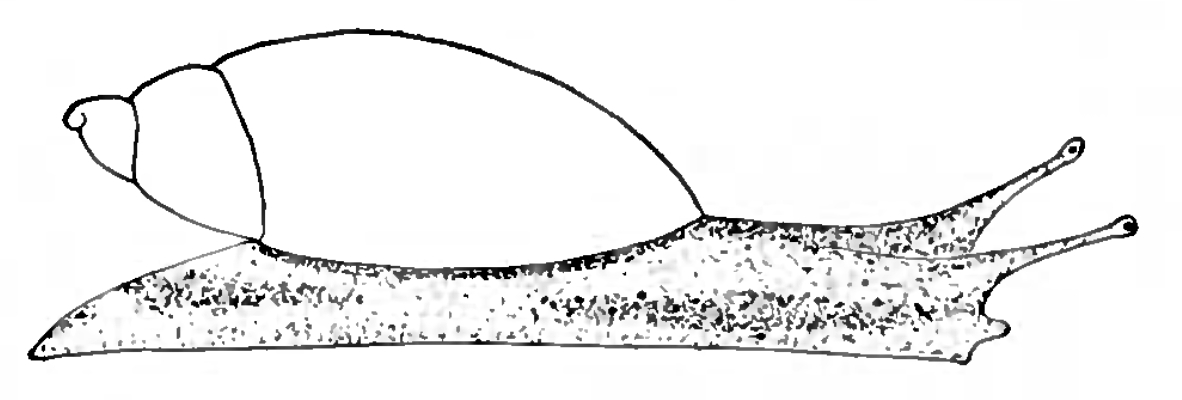
- Drawing of Novisuccinea ovalis

Conservation status
- Secure (NatureServe)

Scientific classification
- Kingdom: Animalia
- Phylum: Mollusca
- Class: Gastropoda
- Order: Stylommatophora
- Family: Succineidae
- Genus: Novisuccinea
- Species: N. ovalis

Binomial name
- Novisuccinea ovalis (Say, 1817)

Synonyms
- Succinea ovalis; Succinea obliqua

= Novisuccinea ovalis =

Species of gastropod

Novisuccinea ovalis, commonly called the oval ambersnail, is a species of air-breathing land snail, a terrestrial pulmonate gastropod mollusk in the family Succineidae, the ambersnails.

== Distribution and habitat ==
This species occurs in eastern and central North America, throughout the United States (from Maine to the Midwest) and Canada (Maritime Provinces to Saskatchewan) along river systems. It is considered extirpated from Mississippi.

== Parasites ==
Parasites of Novisuccinea ovalis include:

- Leucochloridium variae

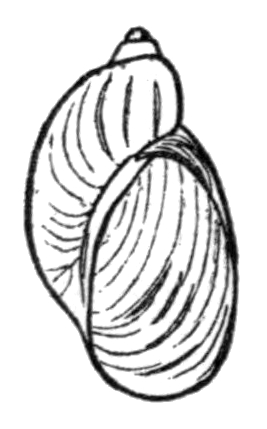
Drawing of the shell of Novisuccinea ovalis
