= Tipperary Hill =

Neighborhood of Syracuse, New York, United States

Coordinates: 43.046546°N 76.185572°W

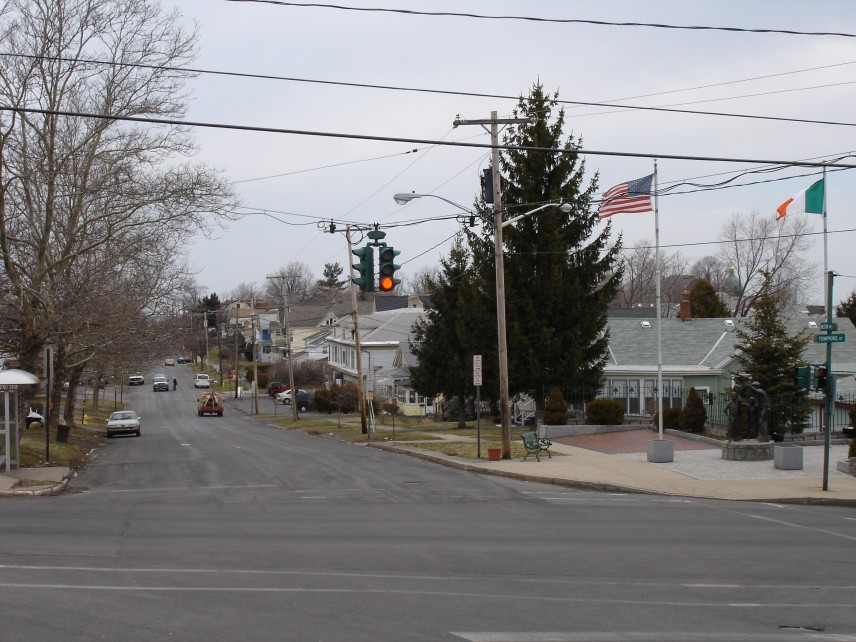
The "Green-on-Top" or "Red-on-Bottom" Traffic Light

Tipperary Hill, sometimes known as Tipp Hill, is a district in the city of Syracuse, New York. The area is named after County Tipperary in Ireland. It is largely settled by immigrants from Ireland, especially from County Tipperary. It makes up half of Syracuse's Far Westside neighborhood.

== History ==
In the 1820s, when the Erie Canal first was built from Albany, New York to Buffalo, New York, Irish Americans were the chief laborers. Syracuse is about the middle of the route, the "hub" of the system. When the canal was finished many of these Irish Americans settled west of Syracuse on a hill overlooking the canal. This area became known as Tipperary Hill.

=== The Green-on-Top Traffic Light ===
Tipperary Hill is the home of the only upside-down traffic light in the United States. When the city first started to install traffic signal lights in the 1920s, one was installed at a major intersection on Tipperary Hill, on the corner of Tompkins Street and Milton Avenue. Some Irish American youths, incensed at the symbolism of the "British" red being placed above the "Irish" green, broke the light. Several replacements were also broken until the city decided to invert the traffic light to pacify the locals.

== Modern Tipperary Hill ==
In recent years some long time neighborhood residents of Irish ancestry and local business owners gathered resources and encouraged the city first to demolish an old run-down commercial building and then in 1997 to build a small park, the Tipperary Hill Memorial Park, and erect a statue, the Tipperary Hill Heritage Memorial. The memorial is dedicated to those who, in their opinions, were brave sons of Ireland who had stood up to City Hall and won. The statue was created by Dexter Benedict. The park and statue are still there, as is the traffic light. On the eve of every Saint Patrick's Day, someone (or ones) goes out and paints a green shamrock underneath the light.

Although most people in Syracuse know about the Tipp Hill neighborhood there is little agreement as to the exact boundaries of the neighborhood. Before 1886, the entire far west side of what is now Syracuse from Burnet Park north to Milton Avenue in Solvay was known as the Village of Geddes. When the village of Geddes joined the city, there were only two churches in the neighborhood: St. Patrick's Church and The Geddes Methodist Church. Many Irish immigrants were attracted to the neighborhood nearest to St. Patrick's Church and area factories.
