= Italians in Syracuse, New York =

Ethnic group

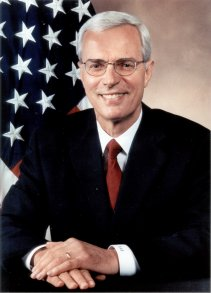
Roy Bernardi, Mayor of Syracuse from 1994 to 2001, and Assistant Secretary for Community Planning and Development at HUD from 2004 to 2008.

The Italians in Syracuse, New York number nearly 22,000 and are concentrated around the Little Italy of Syracuse, and the Northside of the city. Italian immigrants first settled in the area of Syracuse, New York beginning in 1883, after working on construction of the West Shore Railroad, that reached from New York City to Buffalo, New York. In Syracuse, they created an Italian-American community made up of immigrants from several regions of Italy and their descendants.

By 2010, demographics showed that 14.1% of the population in Syracuse was of Italian descent. Many had also settled in Lyncourt, New York, a suburb on the northside of the city.

== History ==
By the end of the nineteenth century, nearly 3,500 Italians lived in Syracuse. They had established a mutual benefit organization called "Society Agostino Depretis", named for a noted Prime Minister of Italy. By the mid-twentieth century, the Italian Americans in Syracuse had largely integrated and assimilated successfully into the larger society. Roy Bernardi (a graduate of Syracuse University) was elected in 1993 as 51st Mayor of the City of Syracuse, New York, where he served from 1994 to 2001. A Republican, he later was appointed to a high-level position at the Department of Housing and Urban Development (HUD) in the administration of President George W. Bush.

In the mid to late twentieth century, Lyncourt, a suburb of Syracuse beyond the North Side, developed as a destination for many Italian-American families migrating to the suburbs for newer housing and other suburban amenities. This continued until the early 21st century, when this transition slowed. More than 3% of people living in Lyncourt speak both Italian and English, a greater percentage than in 99% of the country. During the early 2000s, Lyncourt was one of the most densely populated Italian-American areas in the nation. This culture has greatly influenced the neighborhood, as many families still maintain traditional practices.

=== Language barriers ===
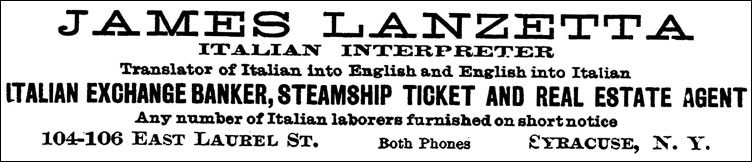
James Lanzetta - Italian Interpreter and Exchange Banker - 104 East Laurel Street, Syracuse, New York, Syracuse City Directory 1908

Because of difficulties learning a new language, most immigrants lived in ethnic "colonies" and worked in large gangs under "bosses" of their own nationality. The earliest Italian immigrants were illiterate.

=== Little Italy ===
Little Italy is an ethnic enclave on the Northside of Syracuse that contains several bakeries, cafés, pizzerias, restaurants, beauty salons, shops, bars and nightclubs.

Originally a German neighborhood following mid-19th century immigration, that population was succeeded by Italian immigrants, as the Germans moved to other housing.

=== Catholic parishes ===
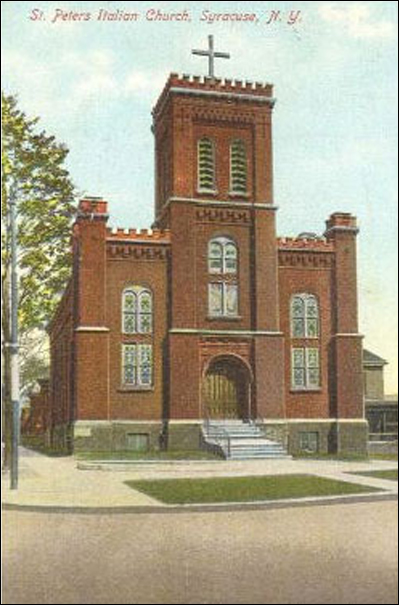
St. Peter's Italian Catholic Church at 130 North State Street, c.1910

By March 1897, almost 7,000 Italians lived in Syracuse and most were Catholic. Rev. Dean L. M. Vernon (d. 1896) opened a Methodist mission in rooms of the West Shore Railroad. His work was followed by that of Rev. Antonio Peruzzi. During the summer of 1896, ten gospel meetings were held in Italian districts.

==== St. Peter's Italian Church ====
In 1896, St. Peter's Italian Church was a Roman Catholic church located at the corner of Burnet Avenue and Lock Street. (It later moved to 130 North State Street), north of Erie Boulevard East. The Italian congregation had taken over what was originally known as The Church of Messiah, built in 1853 by the Unitarian Congregational Society of Syracuse.

The history of the church reflected demographic changes in this area of Syracuse, as a succession of ethnicities occupied the area and used the church. When the Unitarian congregation had mostly moved out of the neighborhood, they sold the building to Lutherans in 1885; that congregation was primarily ethnic German, made up of immigrants and descendants from earlier migrations. Between 1885 and 1895, this building housed St. Mark's German Evangelical Lutheran Church.

The congregation of St. Peter's Italian Church parish purchased the church in 1896 from the Lutherans.

=== Methodist School ===
By December 1905, the W.C.T.U. (Women's Christian Temperance Union, an American society made up primarily of Protestant women at this time) established a school for Italian children at the corner of North State and North Salina streets. The Catholic priest resented the Protestants trying to evangelize among his people.

=== Italianate architecture ===
The North Salina Street Historic District has many buildings of the mid and late 19th century that are predominantly Italianate in style. Their construction preceded the development of the predominantly Italian neighborhood, at a time when American architecture of that period was strongly influenced by European models.

=== Italian clubs ===
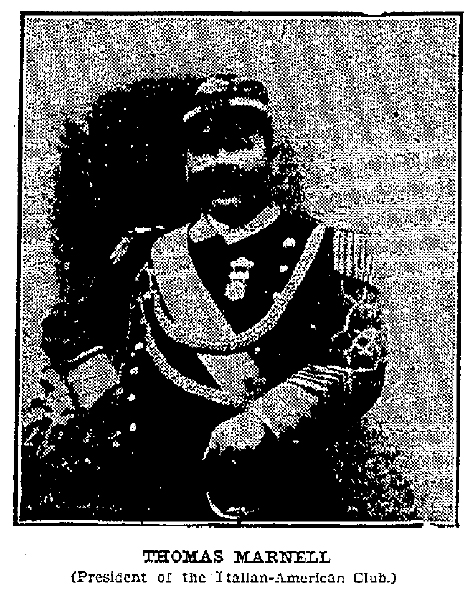
Thomas Marnell - President of the Syracuse Italian-American Club, January 13, 1905

Like other immigrant groups, Italians founded fraternal clubs or mutual aid societies, as places to socialize and help each other. They were often formed by immigrants from the same village or region in Italy. The Italian-American Club of Syracuse voted to attend the inauguration of President Theodore Roosevelt at Washington D.C. in March 1905.

Italians in Syracuse celebrated formation of a new Italian society, Duci Degli Abbruzzi (meaning Dukes from Abruzzi, a province northeast of Rome) with a gala evening and blessing of the flag. The men wore uniforms with gold lace on May 9, 1907; and on a procession around the neighborhood, returning to Turn Hall. Hundreds of people viewed the procession, where James Lanzetta officiated as grand marshal.

By 1929 a number of Italian-American lodges were established in Syracuse in addition to that of Abruzzi: Ruggiero Settimo (named for a leader in Sicily), Onesta e Lavoro ("Honest Work"), Duca Degli Abruzzi, Maria Montessori (named after a noted educator), Junior Progresso Lodge, Excelsior, and Golden Jubilee Lodge (a women's lodge). Founded by three local men, the Order Sons of Italy in America established a lodge in Syracuse in 1929. Over the decades since then, people's interests changed as they became more assimilated into other areas of American society. By 1974, all but the Progesso Lodge and Golden Jubilee Lodge had dissolved; these two combined that year into what is known as the Progresso Lodge #1047. They have continued to raise money for charitable and local causes, helped support the annual festivals and parades, and worked for social justice.

== Italian events ==
Ethnic Italians continue to celebrate their heritage, including American citizenship:

- Festa Italia Syracuse is a three-day event in downtown Syracuse that has been celebrated since 1996. It is held in late September in front of city hall at Washington and Montgomery streets.
- Little Italy's Columbus Day Parade, begins three days of festivities, beginning on Friday night before the formal holiday in mid-October.

== See also ==
- Italian Americans
- Little Italy, Syracuse
- St. Peter's Italian Church (Syracuse, New York)
