= Northside, Syracuse =

Neighborhood in Syracuse, New York

Coordinates: 43.065°N 76.145°W

The Northside is a neighborhood in the city of Syracuse, New York (USA) consisting of a residential area bordered by commercial corridors. As defined by Syracuse's "Tomorrow's Neighborhoods Today" planning system, the Northside is a large section of the city of Syracuse, covering almost four square miles. There are 16 census tracts, within which are 36 census blockgroups. Thus, there are many sub-regions that have developed with their own unique identities, such as the Near Northeast neighborhood, the Little Italy District and the Hawley-Green Historic District.

The Northside of Syracuse is a neighborhood rich in history and culture. Settled primarily by German-Americans in the 19th century, the Northside soon became home to other new Americans. Once popularly identified as Little Italy, the neighborhoods cultural landmarks such as Assumption Church and the annual Columbus Day Parade speak to a lingering celebration of the population’s Italian origins. In the 21st century, the neighborhood has become home to many nations, representing a diverse array of language, culture and ethnicities. New Americans from the Democratic Republic of Congo, Sudan, Somalia, Bhurma, Nepal, Bhutan, Vietnam and Eastern Europe come together to make the neighborhood a vibrant and pluralistic area.

== Notable sites ==
- Open Hand Theater
- Schiller Park
- North Salina Street Historic District
- Little Italy Business District
- Washington Square Park

== Revitalization efforts ==
Like many rust belt cities, Syracuse has experienced population loss as residents move to the suburbs or pursue opportunities in other regions. This disinvestment in infrastructure and services is magnified in many urban neighborhoods. While the Northside has suffered in this vein, it remains a place recognized for its past and current assets, and its potential for sustainable, local development.

Multiple neighborhood residents, businesses, and organizations have been active in revitalization efforts for the neighborhood. These efforts have included garnering support and opportunity for local artists, initiatives to improve the building stock, and improvements in housing options, to name a few. St. Joseph’s Hospital, the neighborhood’s largest economic institution, is furthering the positive growth and development of the Northside. In 2009, St. Joseph's Hospital broke ground on a $220 Million expansion.
