= Temple Society of Concord =

Reform synagogue in Syracuse, New York, US

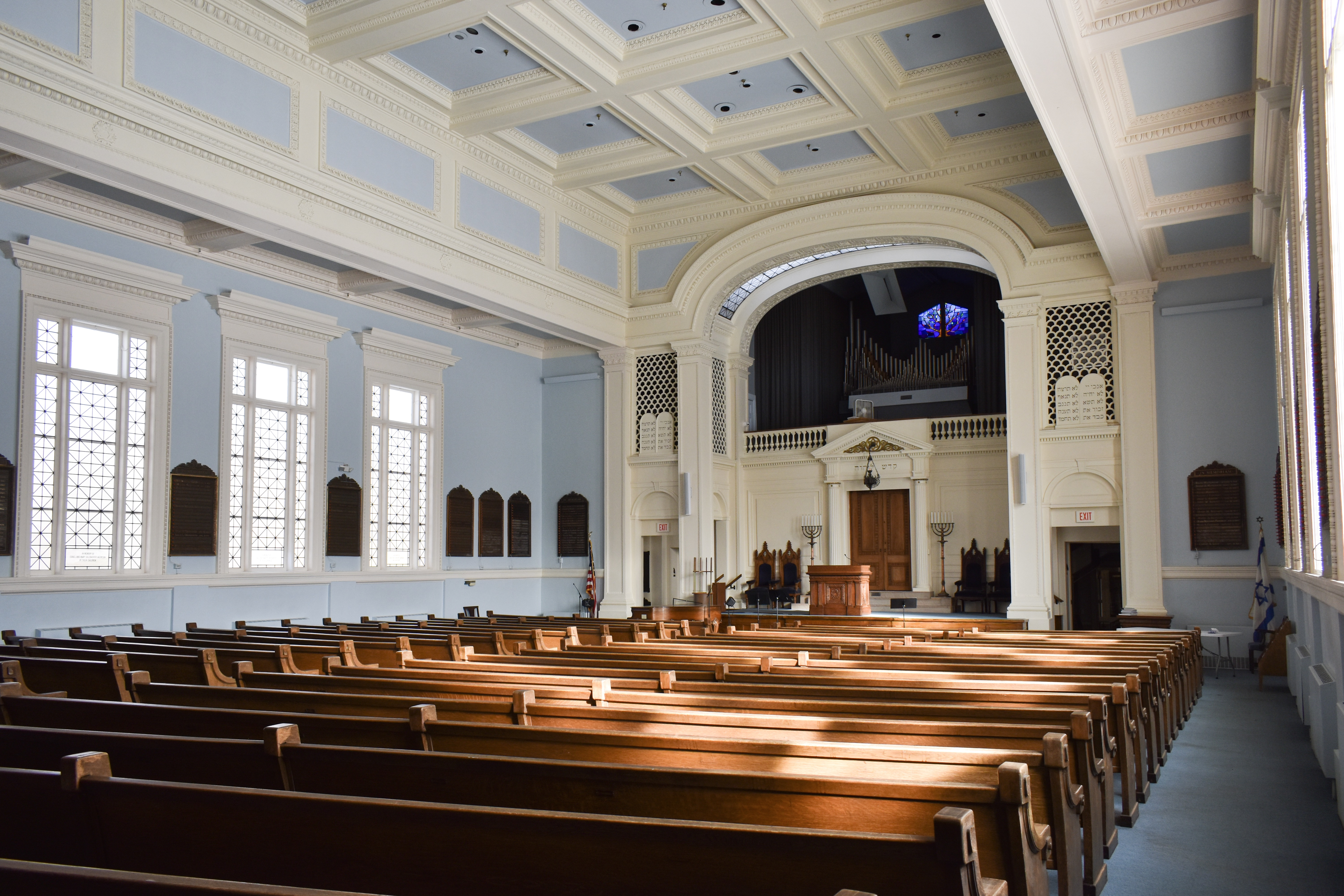
- Interior of the synagogue's sanctuary in 2019

- Location in New York

Religion
- Affiliation: Reform Judaism
- Ecclesiastical or organizational status: Synagogue
- Leadership: Rabbi Ilan Emanuel Cantor Kari Siegel Eglash
- Status: Active

Location
- Location: 450 Kimber Road, Syracuse, Onondaga County, New York 13224
- Country: United States
- Interactive map of Temple Society of Concord
- Coordinates: 43°02′42″N 76°08′02″W

Architecture
- Architects: Alfred Taylor; Arnold W. Brunner (consultant)
- Type: Synagogue
- Style: Neo-classical
- Established: 1839 (as a congregation)
- Completed: 1911
- Construction cost: $100,000
- Materials: Limestone

Website
- templeconcord.org
- Temple Society of Concord
- U.S. National Register of Historic Places
- NRHP reference No.: 09000259
- Added to NRHP: April 27, 2009

The Temple Society of Concord, commonly referred to as Temple Concord, is a Reform Jewish congregation and synagogue located at 450 Kimber Road, in Syracuse, Onondaga County, New York, in the United States.

Established in 1839, it is the ninth-oldest active Jewish congregation in the United States. Temple Concord, a member of the Union for Reform Judaism, is the leading Reform synagogue in Central New York, and maintains the largest Jewish religious school in the region. Religious services are held every Friday night and Saturday morning, and on Jewish holidays. Religious school and adult education programs take place twice a week. Temple Concord is also the setting for a wide array of educational, cultural and social events the serve then entire Syracuse-area community.

The synagogue building was listed on the National Register of Historic Places in 2009; and in 2019 the congregation announced plans to sell the historical synagogue building, due to financial pressures.

== Early history ==
Temple Concord was founded in 1839 by German immigrants drawn to upstate New York by the new Erie Canal. The small group gathered in a back room of a local store for meetings and worship services. By 1841 they had moved to the second floor of a member's home on Mulberry Street, from where they hired their first religious leader (he was not formally trained or ordained as a rabbi). The group incorporated under the laws of the State of New York on February 24, 1942. and first took the name "Comrades of Peace" and shortly thereafter Keneseth Shalome, which they translated in formal English as Temple Society of Concord. Incorporation papers list Max Thalheimer, Samuel Bernheimer and Joseph Wiseman as trustees.

19th century rabbis included Bernard Illowy.

== Synagogue and related buildings ==
In 1851, the congregation erected its first purpose-built synagogue building at Harrison and Mulberry Streets. The cost was $10,000, a substantial sum at the time.

The present Neo-classical-style sanctuary at the corner of Madison Street and University Avenue, with an attached social hall, was designed by Syracuse-based architect Alfred Taylor and New York-based consulting architect Arnold W. Brunner. The cornerstone was laid on September 19, 1910 and the building was dedicated on September 23, 1911. It was built at a cost of $100,000. The social hall was expanded and a classroom building added in the 1920s. The Hiram and Mabel Weisberg Religious School, designed by Edward C. Roock, was built on the east side of the complex and dedicated on February 12, 1961.

The Benjamin M. Berinstein Memorial Chapel was built in 1997 inside the former 1920s education building. Allen Kosoff, a congregant, was the architect, and John Dobbs designed the stained glass windows.

The 1910-11 building was added to the National Register of Historic Places on April 27, 2009.

In July 2019, in light of stagnant membership, a rising deficit, and declining participation, members of the congregation voted to sell the building for $9 million, to be converted into student housing. Initial plans by the developer were scaled back in light of community opposition that claimed the proposed development was "too big and out of character". A revised proposal was submitted to consenting authorities in 2021 that proposed 210 apartments with 599 beds.

== Gallery ==
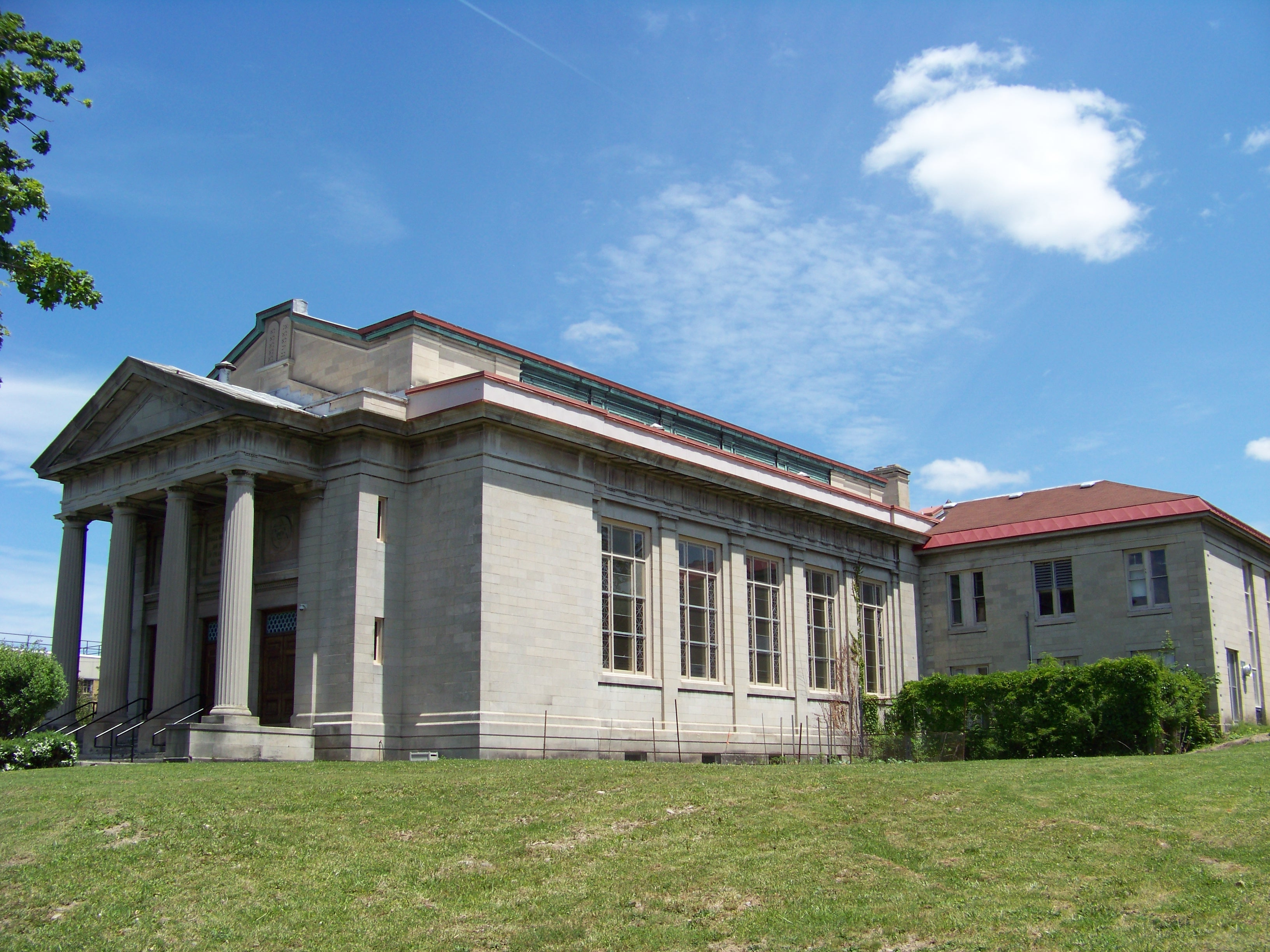
Sanctuary exterior

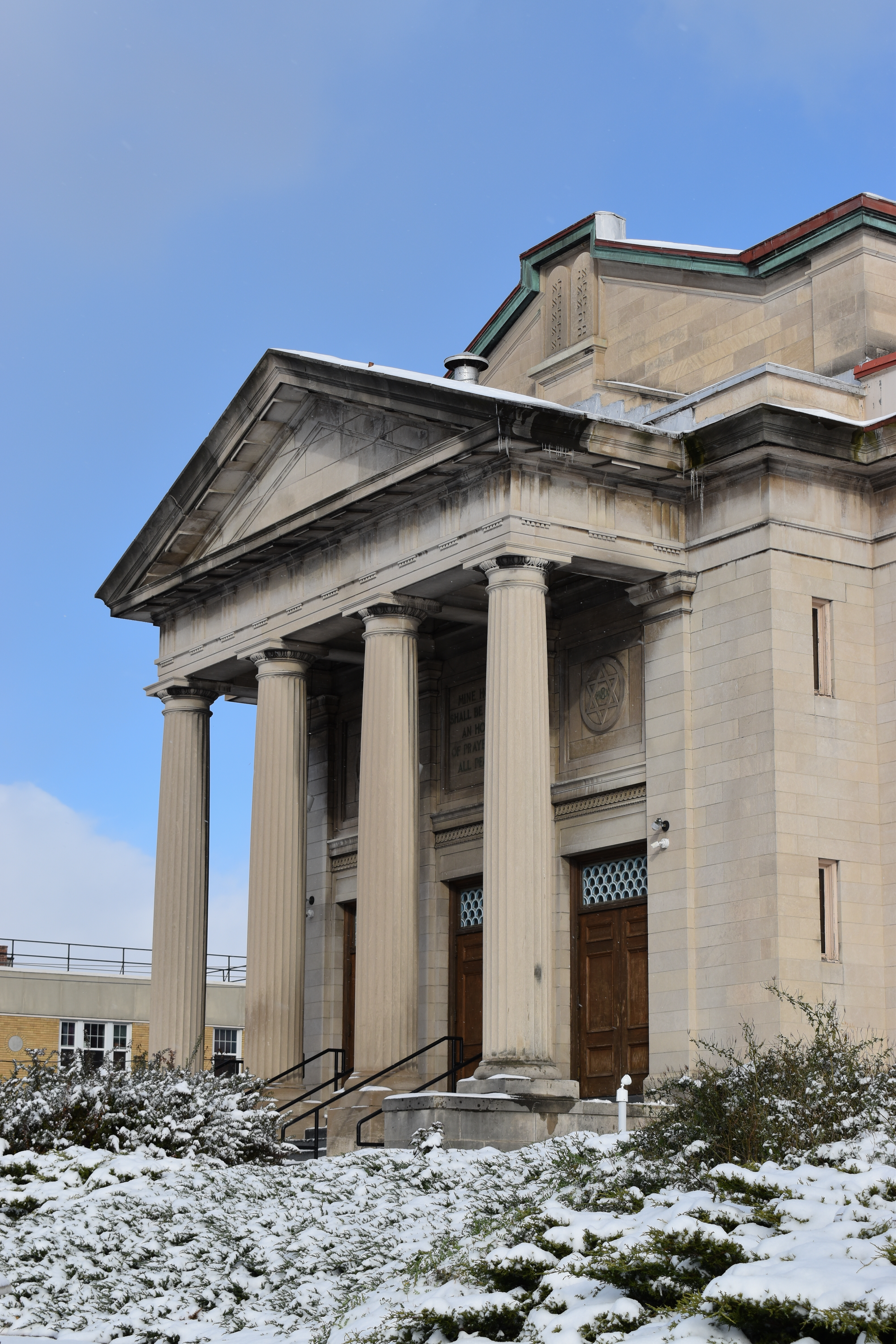
Sanctuary facade

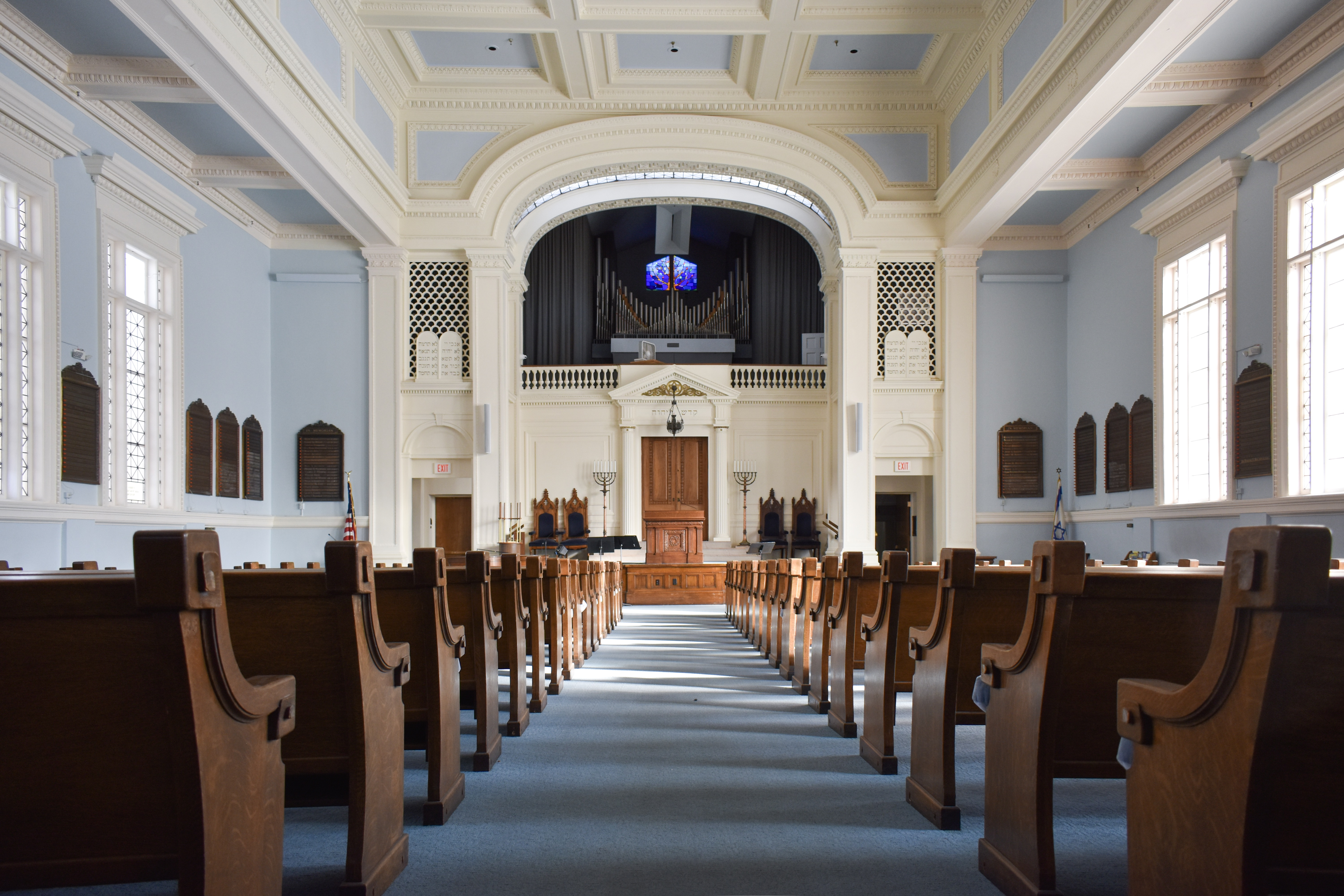
View of the interior facing the ark

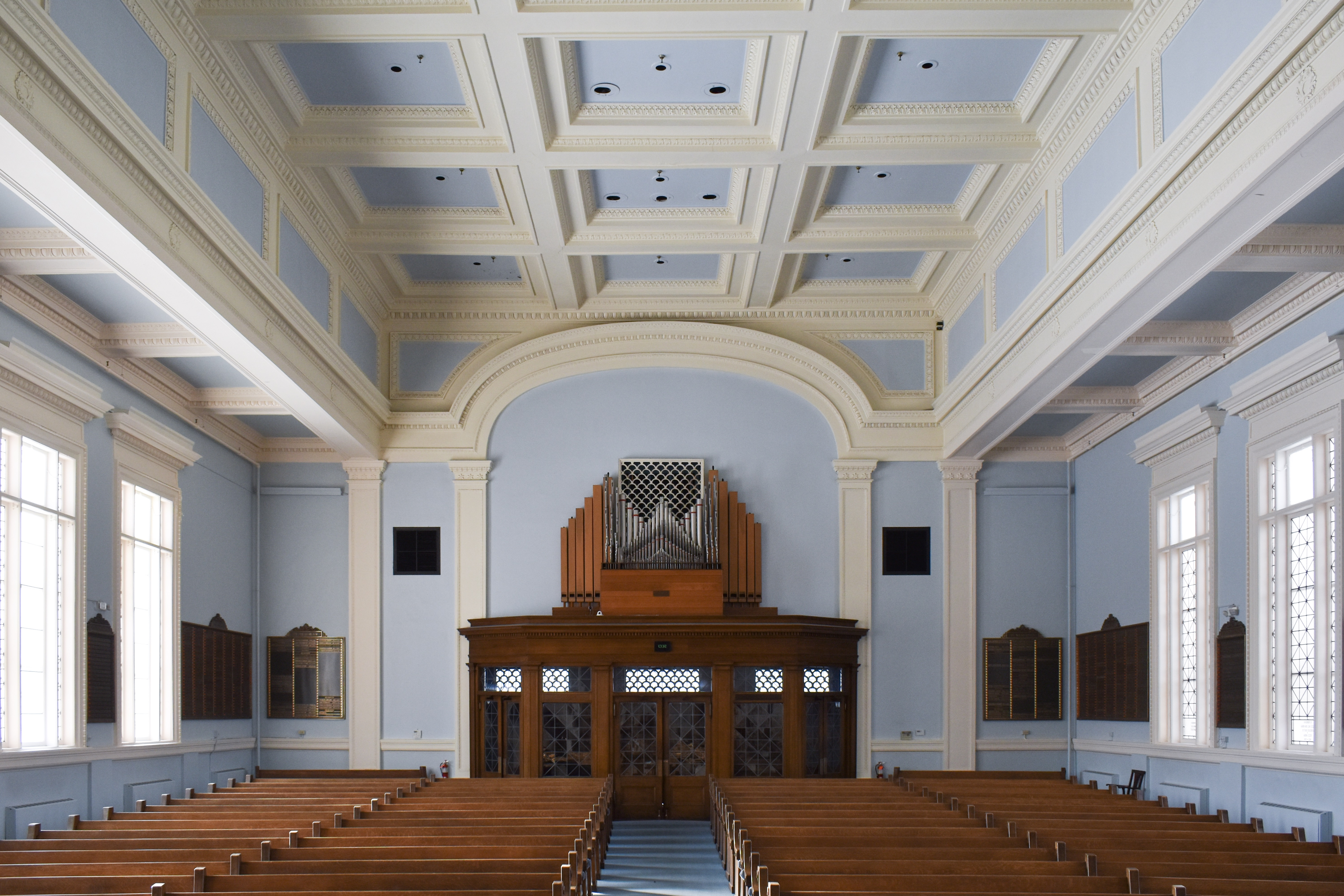
View of the interior from the bema

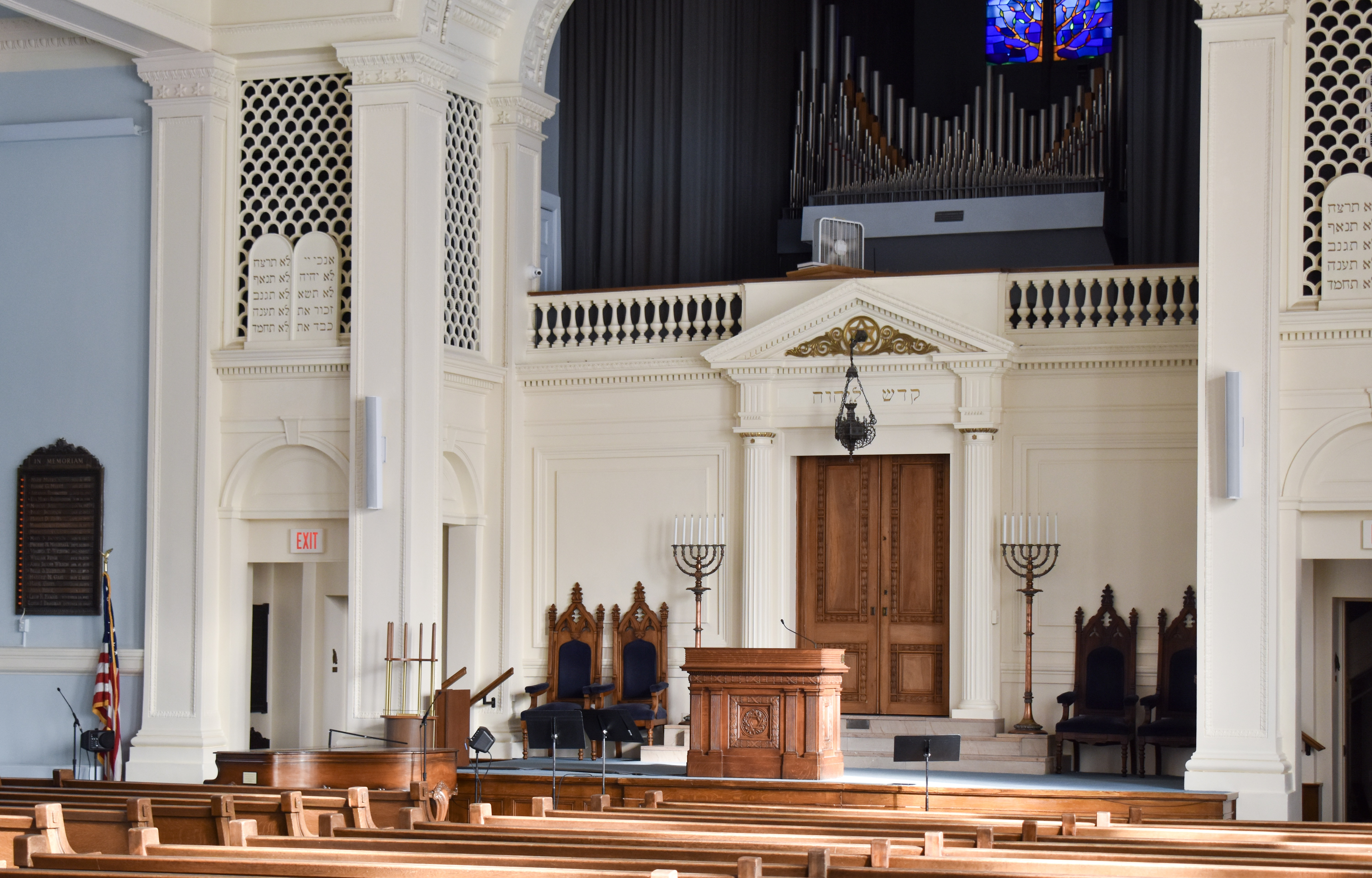
The bema

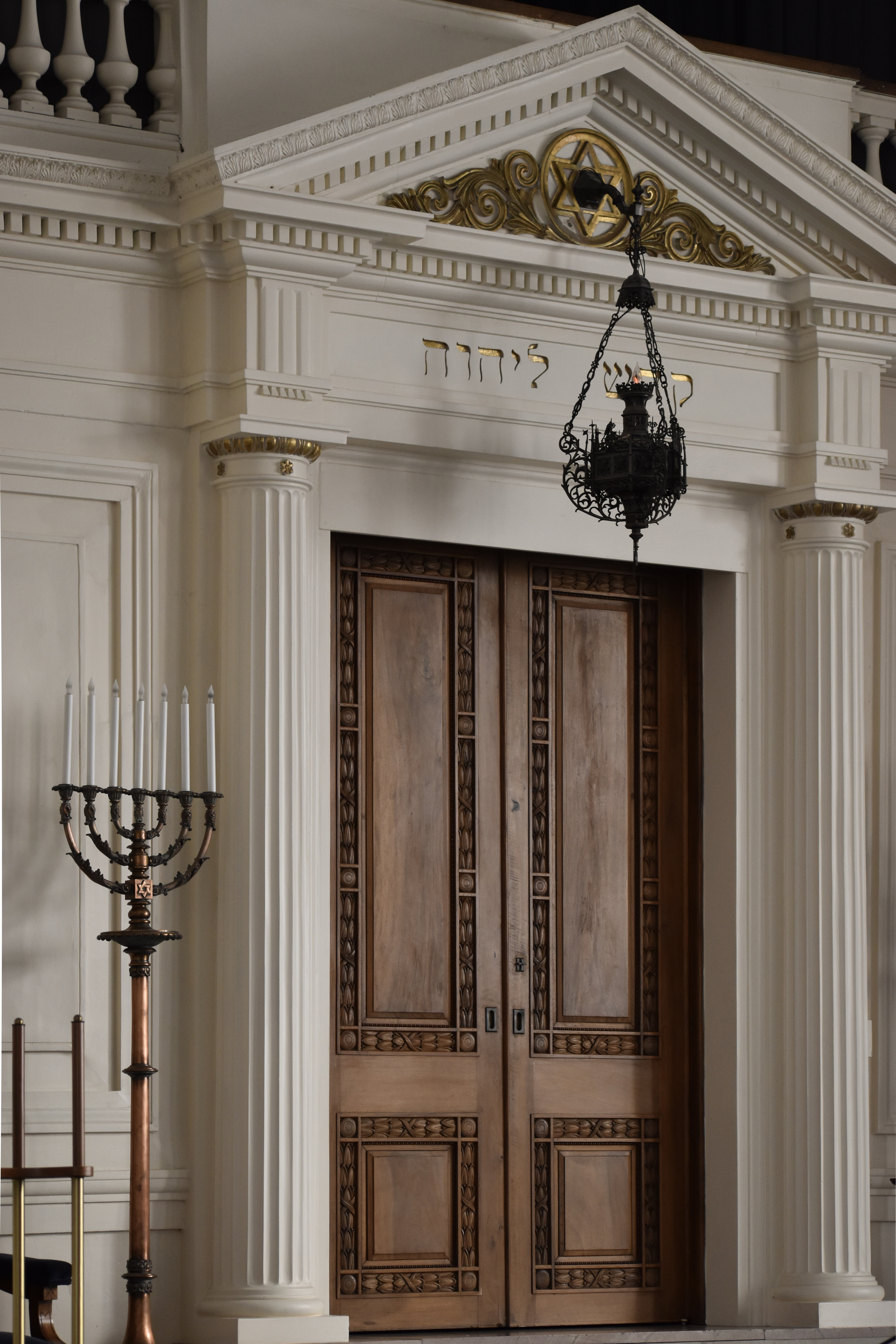
The ark

== See also ==
- Ethnic groups in Syracuse, New York
- List of the oldest synagogues in the United States
- Louis Marshall
