= New Kasson Apartments =

- U.S. National Register of Historic Places
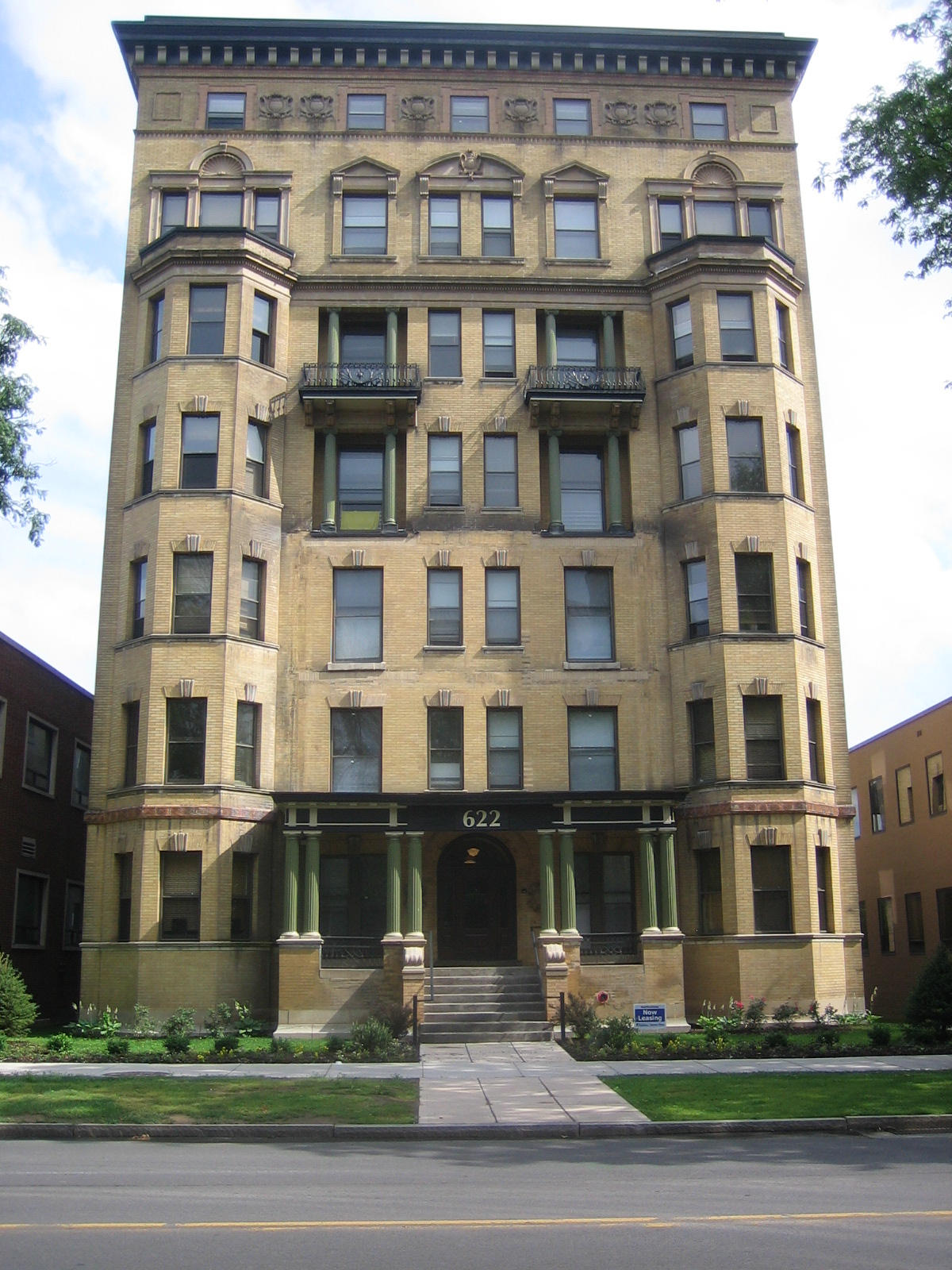

- Location within New York Location within the United States
- Location: 622 James St., Syracuse, New York
- Coordinates: 43°03′15.8″N 76°08′36.6″W
- Area: Less than 1 acre (0.40 ha)
- Built: 1898
- Architect: Merrick and Randall
- Architectural style: Renaissance Revival
- NRHP reference No.: 11000600
- Added to NRHP: August 24, 2011

The New Kasson Apartments is a historic apartment building located on James Street in the Near Northeast neighborhood of Syracuse, Onondaga County, New York. It was designed by architectural firm of Merrick and Randall and built in 1898. It is a seven-story, Renaissance Revival style building consisting of two rectangular multi-story blocks. It is a yellow brick and limestone building with cast stone and terra cotta details. The facades features projecting three-sided bays extending from the first through fifth floors. It is located across from the Leavenworth Apartments built in 1912.

It was listed on the National Register of Historic Places in 2011.

== Gallery ==
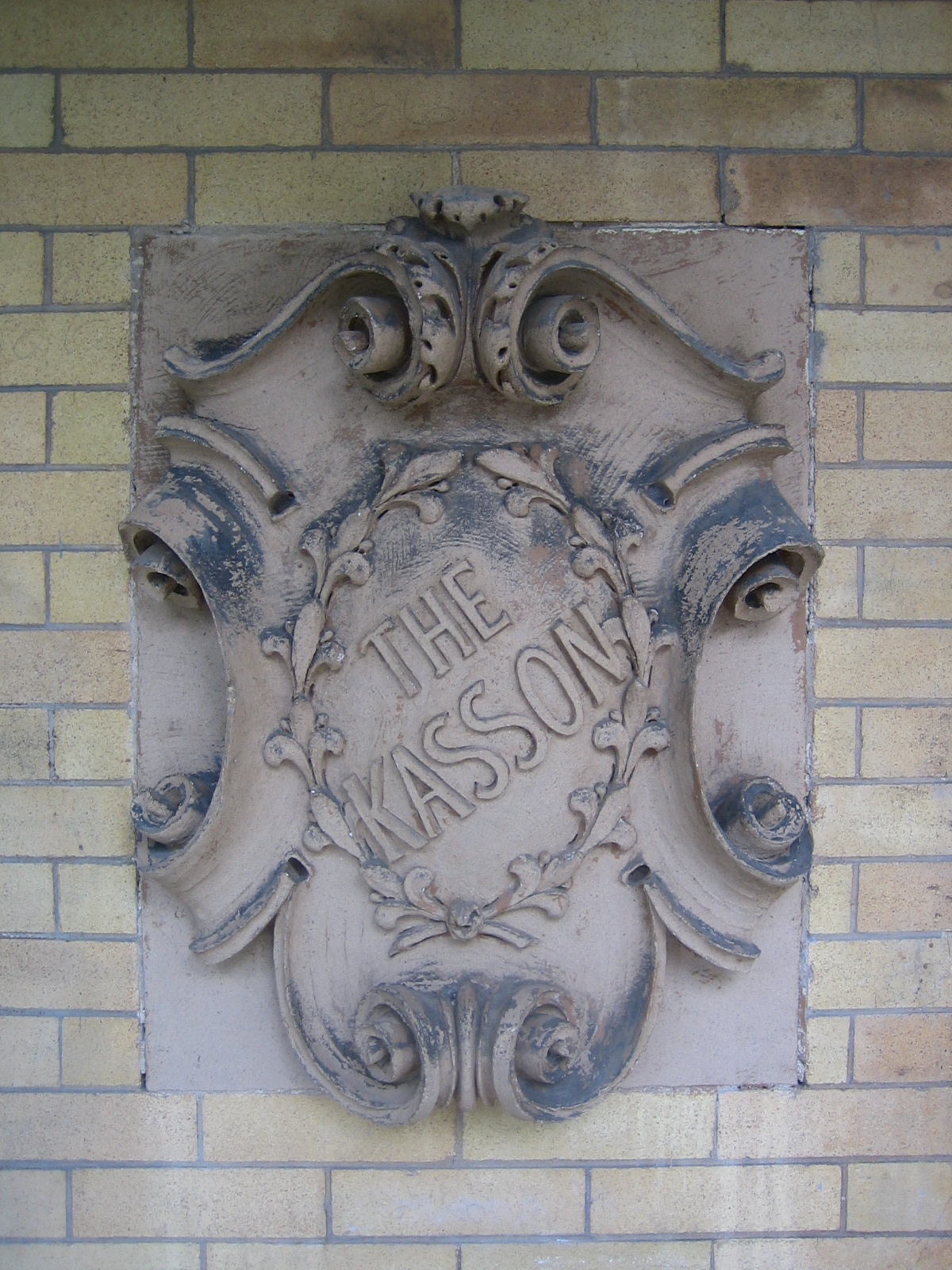
Terra cotta(?) emblem by front door
