= Leavenworth Apartments =

- U.S. National Register of Historic Places
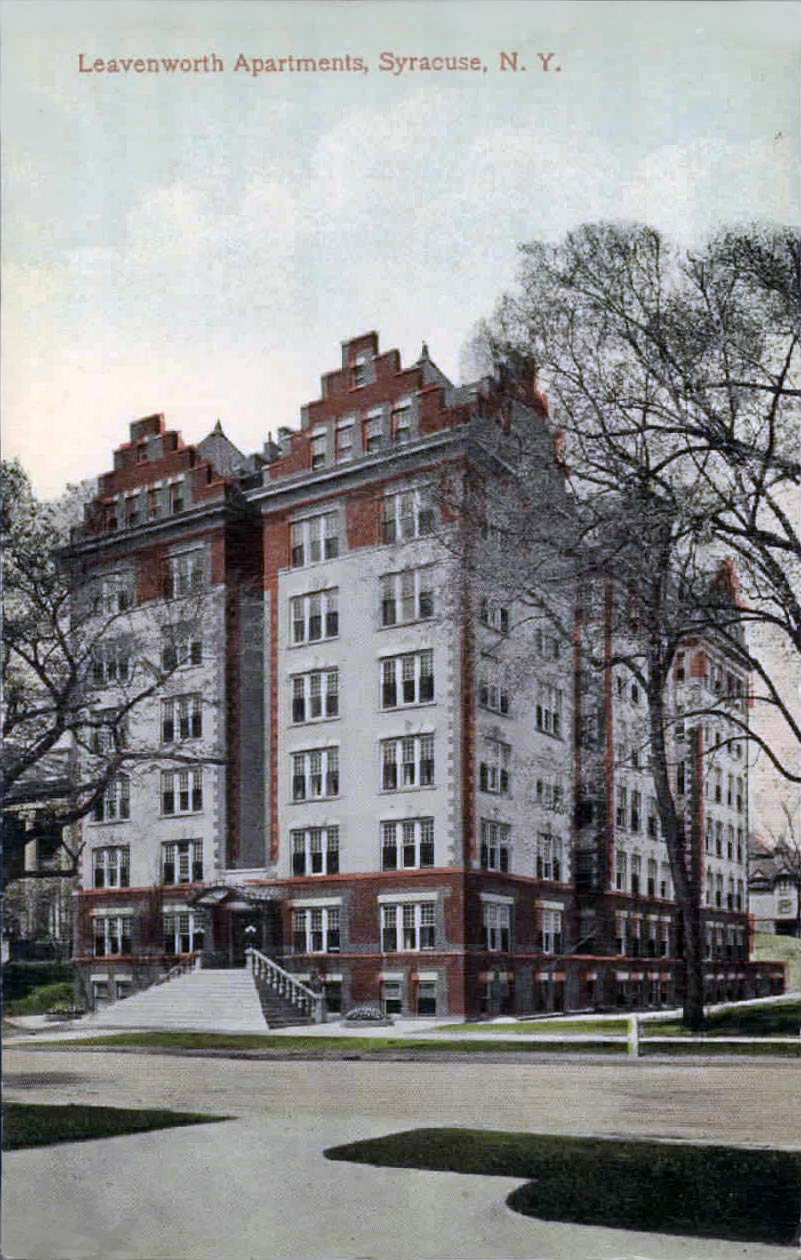
- Leavenworth Apartments, 1920

- Location within New York Location within the United States
- Location: 615 James St., Syracuse, New York
- Coordinates: 43°03′16″N 76°08′39″W
- Area: Less than 1 acre (0.40 ha)
- Built: 1912
- Architect: Colton, Charles E.
- Architectural style: Colonial Revival
- NRHP reference No.: 11000599
- Added to NRHP: August 24, 2011

Leavenworth Apartments is a historic apartment building located in the Near Northeast neighborhood of Syracuse, Onondaga County, New York. It was designed by architect Charles Erastus Colton and built in 1912. It is a seven-story, Colonial Revival style asymmetrical building in six sections. It is a steel frame and masonry building with cast stone details. The building features stepped gable ends. It is located across from the New Kasson Apartments built in 1898.

It was listed on the National Register of Historic Places in 2011.
