= Near Northeast, Syracuse =

Coordinates: 43.056°N 76.142°W

Near Northeast Near Northside
- Neighborhood
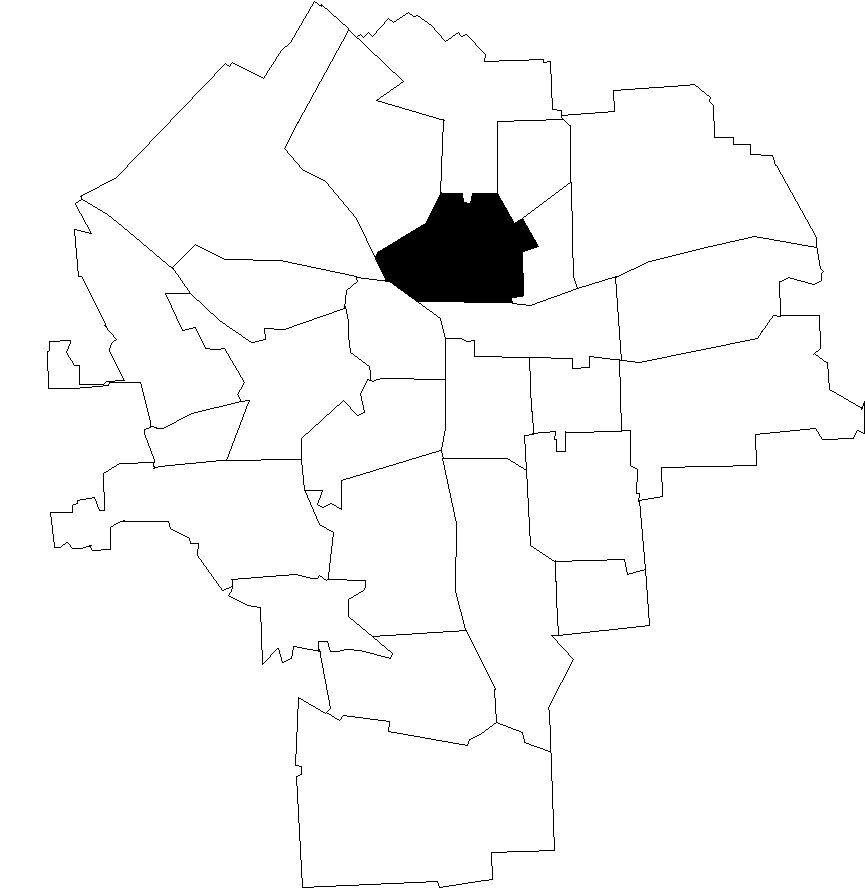
- Location in Syracuse
- Country: United States
- State: New York
- County: Onondaga County
- Incorporated: 1825, 1835, 1847

Population (2000)
  - Total: 8,792

Near Northeast is a Syracuse, New York neighborhood, located northeast of the city's downtown. It corresponds to Onondaga County Census Tract 15, 16, 23, and 24.

== Borders ==
Northwestern

- Butternut Street

Northern

- South Carbon Street
- Farmer Street

Northeastern

- Dewitt Street
- Sedgwick Street

Eastern

- Elm Street

Southern

- Interstate 690

Southwestern

- Interstate 81

== Streets ==
The Near Northeast is bisected by James Street. Other major roads in the neighborhood include State Street, Butternut Street, Lodi Street, and Burnet Avenue.

== Education ==
The Near Northeast is home to Dr. Weeks Elementary School.

== Retail ==
The section of State Street located in the Near Northeast is the main retail street of Syracuse's Little Italy, with dozens of shops and eateries. As this neighborhood is fairly urban, there is retail scattered throughout it.

== Characteristics ==
The Near Northeast is an urban working-class neighborhood. As of the 2000 Census, 8,792 people lived in there. 66.5% were White, 19.1% Black, 14.4% other. 50.9% were female, 49.1% male. The median age was 34.4, and the median household income was $21,437. Registered voters are 45% Democrat, 23% Republican, 24% non-enrolled, and 8% percent other.

The Near-Northeast section of Syracuse is also home to the Hawley-Green Historic District, one of the few 19th century residential areas left in the city, located one block south of James Street. Many of the homes in the area are painted in vibrant colors. A group of about 40 people, who call themselves Hawley-Green GLBT (Gay, Lesbian, Bisexual or Transgender) Neighbors, have been marketing the neighborhood as gay- and lesbian-friendly.

In addition to the Hawley-Green Historic District, the Barnes-Hiscock House, First English Lutheran Church, Garrett House, Leavenworth Apartments, New Kasson Apartments, and Louis Will House are listed on the National Register of Historic Places.
