= Ethnic groups in Syracuse, New York =

The story of the city of Syracuse began with the land which was covered with swamps and bogs, and with a large forest surrounding a clear, freshwater lake located in the northeast corner of the Finger Lakes Region. The land around the present day city was originally the home of the Haudensaunee, or the Onondaga Nation. They were members of the Iroquois Confederacy, which spanned most of Upstate New York.

Over the course of 400 years, ethnic groups from all over the world have been attracted to the Central New York area, including the African, Asian, British, French, German, Greek, Irish, Italian, Jewish, Lebanese, Latino, Native American, Pacific Islander, Polish, Assyrian, Ukrainian, and Welsh communities.

In the 21st century, Syracuse became home to emigrants from Somalia, Vietnam, Iraq, Syria, Sudan, South Sudan, Afghanistan, Bosnia, and many other countries.

== Background ==
The first whites to arrive in Onondaga County were the French missionaries. The English arrived soon after. Recent demographics indicate that the largest ancestries represented in the city includes African American (27.9%), Irish (15.9%), Italian (14.1%), German (12.2%), English (7.6%), Hispanic (6.5%), Polish (5.0%), Asian (4.0%) and Pacific Islander (1.1%)

=== African ===
The city's Black community dates to the early 19th century when the first African slave settled in the area.

Syracuse was an active center for the abolitionist movement, due in large part to the influence of Gerrit Smith and a group allied with him, mostly associated with the Unitarian Church and their pastor The Reverend Samuel May in Syracuse, as well as with Quakers in nearby Skaneateles, supported as well by abolitionists in many other religious congregations.

Prior to the Civil War, due to the efforts of Jermain Wesley Loguen and others in defiance of federal law, Syracuse was known as the "great central depot on the Underground Railroad". On October 1, 1851, William Henry, a freed slave known as "Jerry", was arrested under the Fugitive Slave Law. The anti-slavery Liberty Party was holding its state convention in the city, and when word of the arrest spread, several hundred abolitionists including Charles Augustus Wheaton broke into the city jail and freed Jerry. The event came to be widely known as the "Jerry Rescue".

By 2010, demographics showed that 31% of the population in Syracuse was of African descent.

=== British ===
The British took an active interest in the land around Onondaga Lake in the early 1700s. They befriended the Onondagas by giving them guns, which were highly prized. A British agent, William Johnson, acquired 200,000 acres (810,000,000 m^{2}) of land in the Mohawk country near present-day Johnstown, New York. In 1751, Johnson heard that the French intended on securing a military post close to some salt springs. He discussed the consequences of that action with the Onondagas and proposed that they grant him rights to all of Onondaga Lake and a two-mile band of land around it. The Onondagas agreed and were paid £350 sterling.

=== French ===
The first Caucasians to arrive in the region around Syracuse, New York were the French. In 1615, Samuel de Champlain launched an attack against the Oneidas with the aid of the Huron and Algonquian Indians who were bitter enemies of the Iroquois.

On August 5, 1654, Father Simon LeMoyne, a Jesuit missionary, arrived in the Onondaga village. During his short stay, LeMoyne drank from a spring which the Onondagas believed to be foul due to an evil spirit. He found it to be a salt water spring and he returned to Canada with salt made from the spring water.

=== German ===
The German immigrants who first settled in the farmlands around Syracuse beginning in the early 19th century came from all areas of Germany including Alsace which was then a part of France. During the 1820s and 1830s, most came from Southern Germany, namely: Baden, Bavaria, Hesse-Darmstadt and Württemberg which were the areas devastated by the Napoleonic War, among others. The arrivals from Northern Germany including Franconia, Lorraine and Prussia came later

By 2010, demographics showed that 12.2% of the population in Syracuse was of German descent.

=== Greeks ===
The Greek population in the United States did not start growing until the 1880s. The largest waves entered the country from 1900 to 1920 and most were young males "who wished to make a fortune and then return to Greece," although 70 percent ended up staying in America. In the early 20th century, most immigrants from Greece were from Laconia, in particular, the city of Sparta in Southern Greece. Since that time, immigration has diversified and new citizens come from all parts of Greece.

During the 1980 U.S. Census, 1,852 people claimed Greek heritage in Onondaga County.

=== Irish ===
The Irish came to the territory of Onondaga County as soldiers with the English Army during the American Revolutionary War circa 1776, however, there were only a few hundred Irish who settled in Onondaga County before the era of the Great Famine from 1848 to 1855.

The earliest Irish to arrive lived on farms in the outskirts of the city. Most were transplants from New England who, with other Yankee farmers, left rocky, barren soil for uncrowded, fertile land in Onondaga County. More than half these Irish were Protestant. They farmed their own land and were not subject to the hatred faced by later arriving Irish-Catholic immigrants. The Irishmen hired themselves out as farmhands to New England squires who owned most of the land. By working hard and saving, many were able to purchase land within five or ten years of their arrival.

During a seven-year period from 1848 to 1855, over 5,000 Irish immigrants found their way to Onondaga County; about 2,000 settled in Syracuse. Immigrants from the same towns or counties back in Ireland often located in the same area. In Geddes, hundreds from Thurles in County Tipperary settled together.

In the 1820s, when the Erie Canal was built from Albany to Buffalo, New York, the Irish were the chief laborers. Syracuse is located in the middle of the route and was considered the "hub" of the system. After the canal was finished, many of the Irish settled west of Syracuse on a hill overlooking the canal on the Far Westside. This area became known as Tipperary Hill and is a prominent Irish-American neighborhood in the city.

By 2010, demographics showed that 15.9% of the population in Syracuse was Irish descent.

=== Italian ===
Italian immigrants came to the area around Syracuse, New York in the early 1880s after providing labor for the construction of the West Shore Railroad. The West Shore Railroad was the name of a railroad that ran from Weehawken, New Jersey, across the Hudson River from New York City, north along the west shore of the river to Albany, New York and then west to Syracuse with final destination in Buffalo. It was organized as a competitor to the New York Central and Hudson River Railroad, but was soon taken over by that company.

They settled on the Northside of Syracuse in a neighborhood along North Salina Street known as Little Italy.

By 2010, demographics showed that 14.1% of the population in Syracuse was Italian descent.

=== Mexicans ===
Mexican immigrants make up Syracuse’s largest Latino community.

=== Onondaga Indian ===
The city stands at the northeast corner of the Finger Lakes Region in Onondaga County which is located in Central New York State. The county, as well as Onondaga Lake, were named after the early inhabitants, the Onondaga Indians, by French missionaries who arrived in the area in the 1600s and founded a mission on the edge of the lake.

=== Ukrainians ===
Ukrainians in Syracuse, New York area arrived in three separate waves and were three disparate groups of people. This is because Ukraine had been occupied by Austro-Hungarians and each group of Ukrainians were known by different names, depending on the nationality of the controlling group in the section of the country they were raised. As a result, most Ukrainians who immigrated to America knew very little about their own culture and the history of their people or country because they were raised in the culture of the occupying nation and educated in occupied schools.

Syracuse's neighborhoods reflect the historically divided population of the city. Traditionally, Ukrainian-Americans settled in the Near Westside on West Fayette, Marcellus, Otisco, Geddes and Delaware Streets; or the Far Westside near Wilbur and Ulster Streets and also the Westside in the Sacred Heart Church area.

== See also ==
- Religion in Syracuse, New York (category)
