= Hawley–Green Historic District =

Historic district in New York, United States

- Hawley–Green Street Historic District
- U.S. National Register of Historic Places
- U.S. Historic district
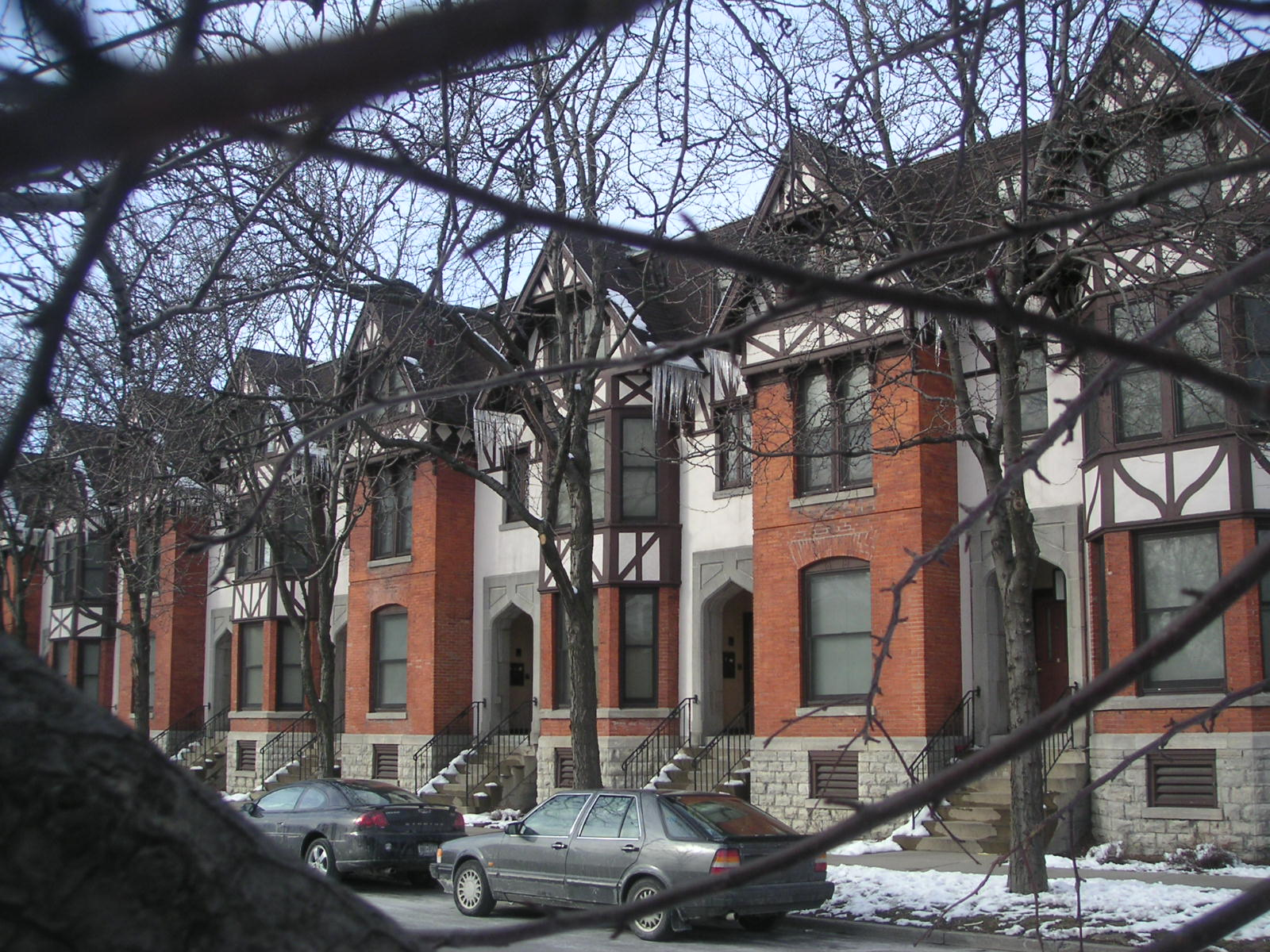
- Rowhouses along Hawley Ave. in the Hawley–Green Neighborhood

- Location within New York Location within the United States
- Location: Wayne, Lodi, Hawley, & N McBride Sts., Syracuse, New York
- Coordinates: 43°3′15″N 76°8′28″W
- Built: 1840
- Architect: Multiple
- Architectural style: Stick/Eastlake, Italianate, Queen Anne
- NRHP reference No.: 79001613 (original); BC100002464 (increase)

Significant dates
- Added to NRHP: May 2, 1979
- Boundary increase: May 18, 2018

The Hawley–Green Historical District is in the Near Northeast neighborhood of Syracuse, New York, United States. The name comes from the district's two principal streets, Hawley Avenue and Green Street. As Hawley–Green Street Historic District, the district was listed on the National Register of Historic Places in 1979. In 2018 its boundaries were increased to include a number of adjacent streets with similarly styled buildings.

== History ==
Tucked away in a triangle that some refer to as the "LBJ" triangle, since its borders consist of Lodi Street, Burnet Avenue, and James Street, the major artery of Syracuse's northeastern neighborhoods, Hawley–Green was at first home to carpenters, wagon makers, silversmiths, painters, and musicians. Its original housing stock consisted of splendid Greek Revival, Gothic Revival, and Italianate-style structures, some of which still line its charming streets. By the late nineteenth century the neighborhood had attracted more upperclass types who replaced many of the original structures with Second Empire, Queen Anne, and the Stick Style homes. The arrival of the streetcar helped fuel this upscale transition. These newer residents were doctors, lawyers, dentists, politicians, and clergy.

As of 2014, a neighborhood on the upswing, many of the homes have been restored, the larger ones converted into multi-unit apartment houses, the smaller ones home to a growing artistic community. The area has become famous for its painted ladies, Victorian homes repainted in pastel colors. In 1979 the district was placed on the National Register of Historic Places. The district has been home to the Syracuse Cultural Workers since 2002 and ArtRage Gallery since 2008.

== An LGBT-friendly neighborhood ==
About forty of the residents of the neighborhood are members of the Hawley–Green LGBT (Lesbian, Gay, Bisexual, or Transgender) Neighbors. This neighborhood group promotes the neighborhood as LGBT-friendly.
