= St. Peter's Italian Church (Syracuse, New York) =

Coordinates: 43°3′19.5″N 76°8′35″W

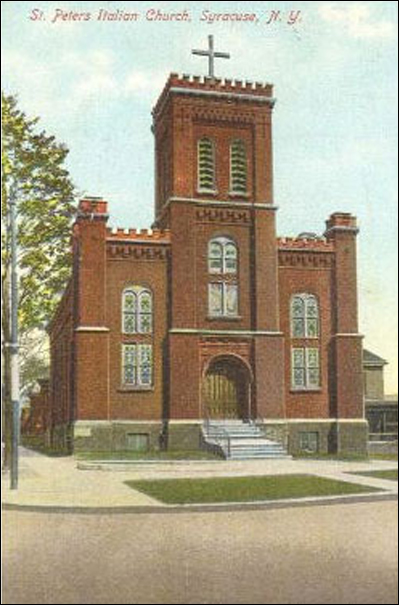
St. Peter's Italian Catholic Church at 130 North State Street in Syracuse, New York

St. Peter's Italian Church was a Roman Catholic national parish serving the Italian community in Syracuse, New York. It was merged with the parish of Our Lady of Pompei in 2008.
