= Little Italy, Syracuse =

Little Italy
- Ethnic enclave
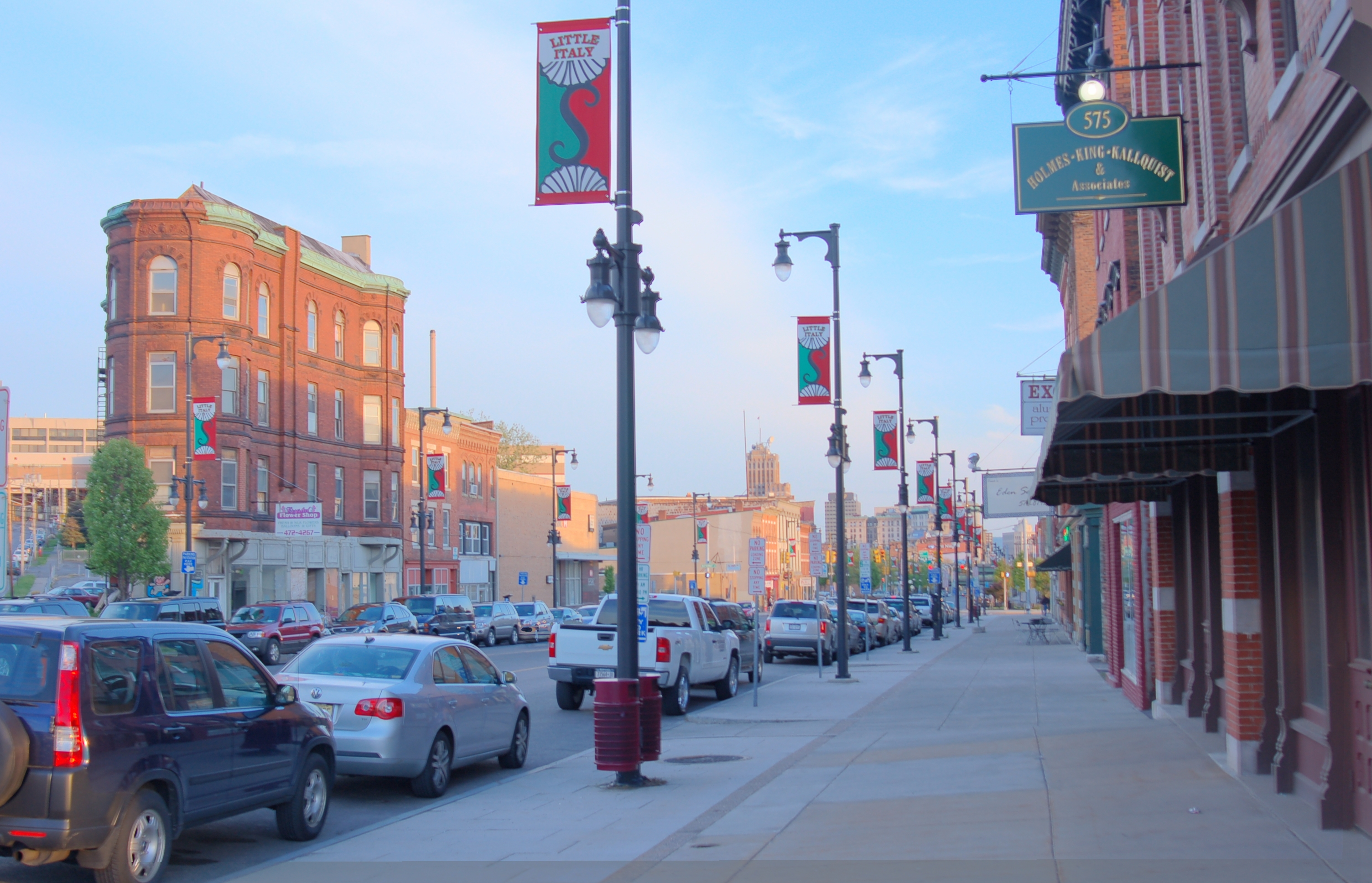
- North Salina Street

- Location within New York
- Coordinates: 43.060°N 76.153°W
- Country: United States
- State: New York
- City: Syracuse
- Established: Early 1880s

Little Italy Syracuse is an ethnic enclave in Syracuse, New York that contains several bakeries, cafés, pizzerias, restaurants, beauty salons, shops, bars and nightclubs. The main street in the neighborhood is North Salina Street.

Italian immigrants began to settle in the Northside of Syracuse in the early 1880s, however, the neighborhood was not officially designated as Little Italy until 2003.

== History ==
=== Immigrants ===
Brilliancy of color is the dominant note of the quarter. Every window blossoms with a mass of flowering plants, and ropes strung with washed clothes of many colors adorn the yards.

— Syracuse Herald, October 1899

Italian immigrants first came to the area around Syracuse, New York in 1883 after providing labor for the construction of the West Shore Railroad. At first, they were quite transient and came and went, but eventually settled down on the Northside.

By 1899, the Italian immigrants were living on the Northside of the city in the area centered around Pearl Street. The Italians all but supplanted the Germans in that area of the city and had their own business district along North State and North Salina Streets.

=== Local businesses ===
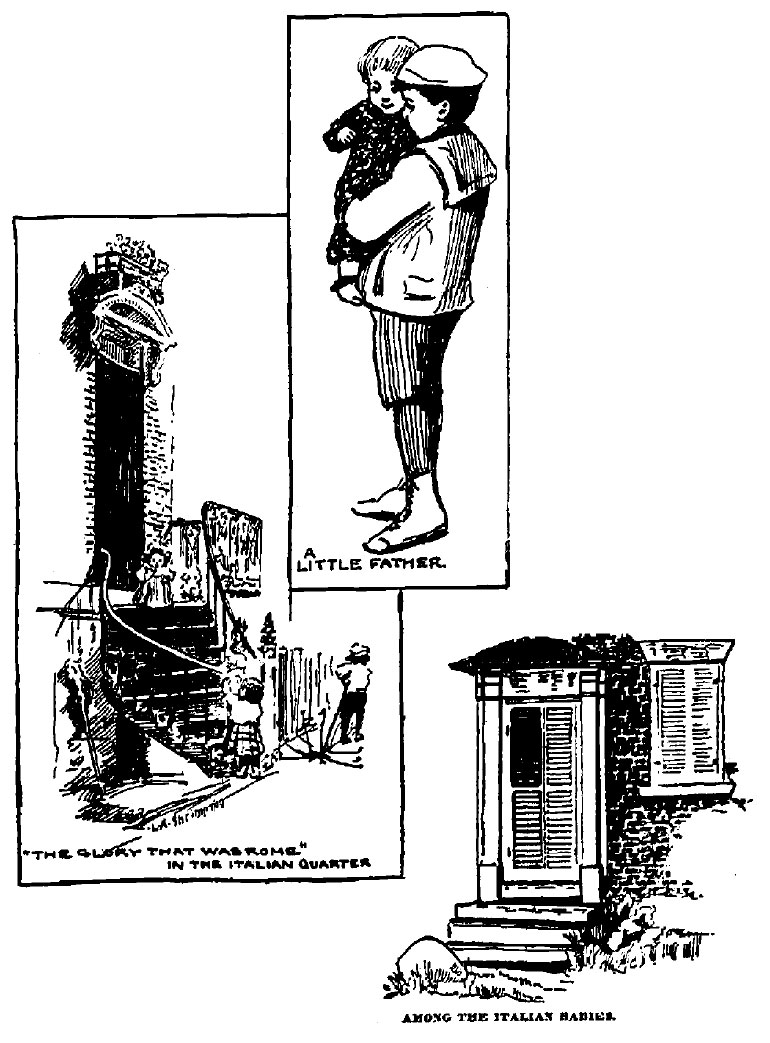
The "Bambinos" of Little Italy - Syracuse, New York in 1899

Early residents in the neighborhood worked in for Learbury Suits, Nettleton Shoes and other Northside factories.

=== Italian foods ===
The Columbus Baking Company has been a mainstay on Pearl Street for over a century. The bakery is family-owned and specializes in four types of bread. Thano's Import Market, located on North Salina Street for over 90 years, sells Italian delicacies such as aged provolone cheese, olives and homemade pasta.

Lombardi's Fruits & Imports, another fixture on the Northside for several decades, carries hundreds of items imported directory from Italy.

=== Produce market ===
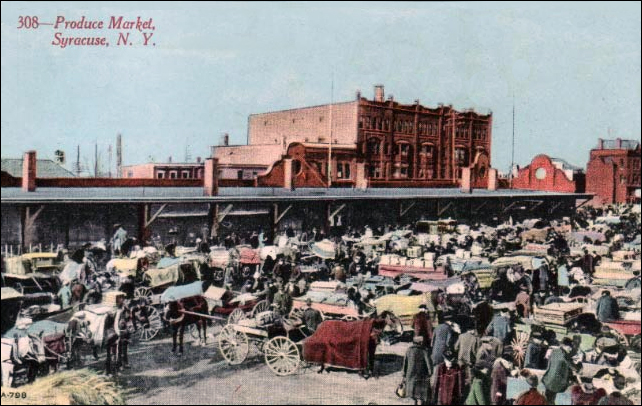
Syracuse Northside Produce Market, c. 1900

August 15, 1899 was the last day local farmers were allowed to use the area between West Genesee Street from Salina to Clinton Streets as a public produce market. Commissioner of Public Works Meagher saw to it that those "having produce to sell" were kept away from Clinton Square.

The old Hay Market on North Salina Street near the Erie Canal lift bridge had been approved as a public market after a delegation of local businessmen, members of the North Side Business Men's Association visited Mayor McGuire and appealed to the Common Council asking for a produce market on the Northside.

The Common Council passed a resolution in June 1899 directing those having hay to sell "vacate the plot of land enclosed by the fence." The result was loads of hay were lined up along Pearl Street and Fulton Street, however, the old market was ready for farmers.

By 1900, the Northside Produce Market supplied fresh fruit and vegetables from farmers in Cicero and North Syracuse to local residents.

Fruit and music are of special importance in the quarter. By means of one or the other most of the men earn their living. As soon as they are tall enough to push a cart the boys start out to sell "bananas." A pervading odor of fruit and vegetables hangs about the place. Before many doors are wide boards spread over with thick slices of tomatoes covered with salt.

— Syracuse Herald, October 1899

=== Hospital ===
St. Joseph's Hospital is a major employer in the neighborhood, which also includes the St. Joseph's College of Nursing.

=== Recent years ===
By September 2009, Syracuse's Little Italy district received millions of dollars of public and private investment for new sidewalks, streetscapes, landscaping, lighting and to set up a "Green Train" program, which trains men to work in green construction and renovation industries.

In recent years, the neighborhood is a mix of Italian shops, restaurant and businesses that cater to the area's South Asian and African population, and vacant storefronts. Although the neighborhood is far less Italian than in past years, banners throughout the district still read Little Italy.
