= Hendricks Chapel =

University Chapel in Syracuse, New York, U.S.

- Hendricks Memorial Chapel
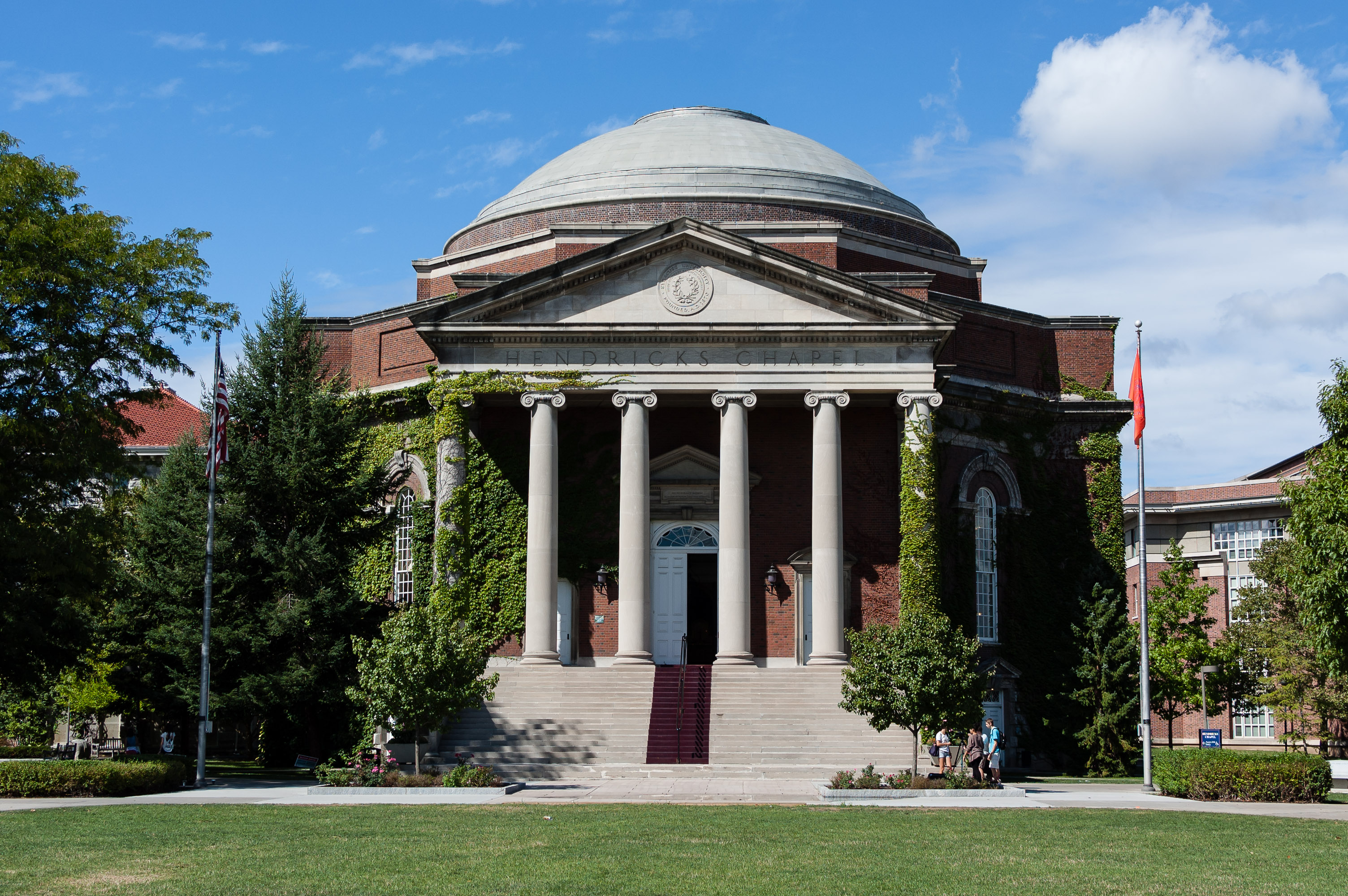
- Hendricks Chapel in 2012, as seen from the Quad
- Hendricks Chapel
- 43.037634°N 76.135120°W
- Location: Syracuse University campus, Syracuse, New York
- Country: United States
- Denomination: Multi-faith
- Website: chapel.syracuse.edu

Architecture
- Functional status: Active
- Architect(s): John Russell Pope and Dwight James Baum
- Architectural type: Georgian Colonial, Palladian
- Years built: 1929–1930
- Groundbreaking: January 1929
- Completed: June 8, 1930; 96 years ago
- Construction cost: $600,000

Specifications
- Capacity: 1000
- Materials: Georgia limestone and brick
- Hendricks Chapel
- U.S. Historic district – Contributing property
- Part of: Syracuse University – Comstock Tract buildings (ID80004279)
- Designated CP: July 22, 1980

Hendricks Chapel is a multi-faith religious, spiritual and cultural chapel located on the campus of Syracuse University in Syracuse, New York. It is located on the Shaw Quadrangle, and serves as the spiritual center of Syracuse University by hosting over ten chaplaincies. The Chapel was funded by a bequest from Francis Hendricks, a former Syracuse mayor, long-time trustee of the university, and the chapel's namesake, in honor of his wife, Eliza Jane Hendricks. The Octagonal, domed brick chapel is built in Georgian Colonial style and is characterized by classical portico supported by columns.

Hendricks Chapel was added to the National Register of Historic Places as part of the Comstock Tract buildings in 1980. The Chapel continues to be a notable center of spiritual and cultural diversity and serves as a place where people can gather for religious, social, cultural, and intellectual purposes, while maintaining its ambiance of sanctuary and its lack of specific religious symbols.

== History ==
The chapel was built with funds donated by New York State Senator Francis Hendricks, who was mayor of Syracuse from 1880 to 1881 and state senator. He was a Syracuse University trustee from 1895 until his death in 1920, and Forestry College trustee from 1913 to 1920. Senator Hendricks, towards the end of his life, used to spend summers near Williamstown, Massachusetts, where he and his niece, Kathryn Hendricks, would often visit the chapel at Williams College. During one of these quiet visits, he decided to provide a chapel at Syracuse University, which he envisioned to be the heart of the campus. He gave the university $500,000 – an amount equivalent to about $8.1 million in 2023 – just before his death in June 1920 at age 85.

=== Construction ===
Due to the leadership change and campus master planning delays, construction of the chapel began late in January 1929 and was completed in June 1930. Despite the challenges posed by the Wall Street Crash of 1929 and the onset of the Great Depression, the Chapel was completed on time and opened immediately after to the university community. Designed by the New York architectural firm John Russell Pope and Dwight James Baum, the Chapel was designed in a style that draws inspiration from the work of 16th-century Italian architect Palladio and the Roman Pantheon, a place for all the gods. The contract valued just under $600,000 was awarded to the A. E. Stephens Company of Springfield, Massachusetts, in November 1928, who built it in Georgia limestone and brick. To locate the chapel on a central space facing west end of the Old Oval, the Womens Gym (previously the Old Gym) was lifted on blocks and moved south in 1928 to space that now is occupied by the Physics Building. At the time of its construction, Hendricks was the third largest University chapel in the country, seating 1,450.

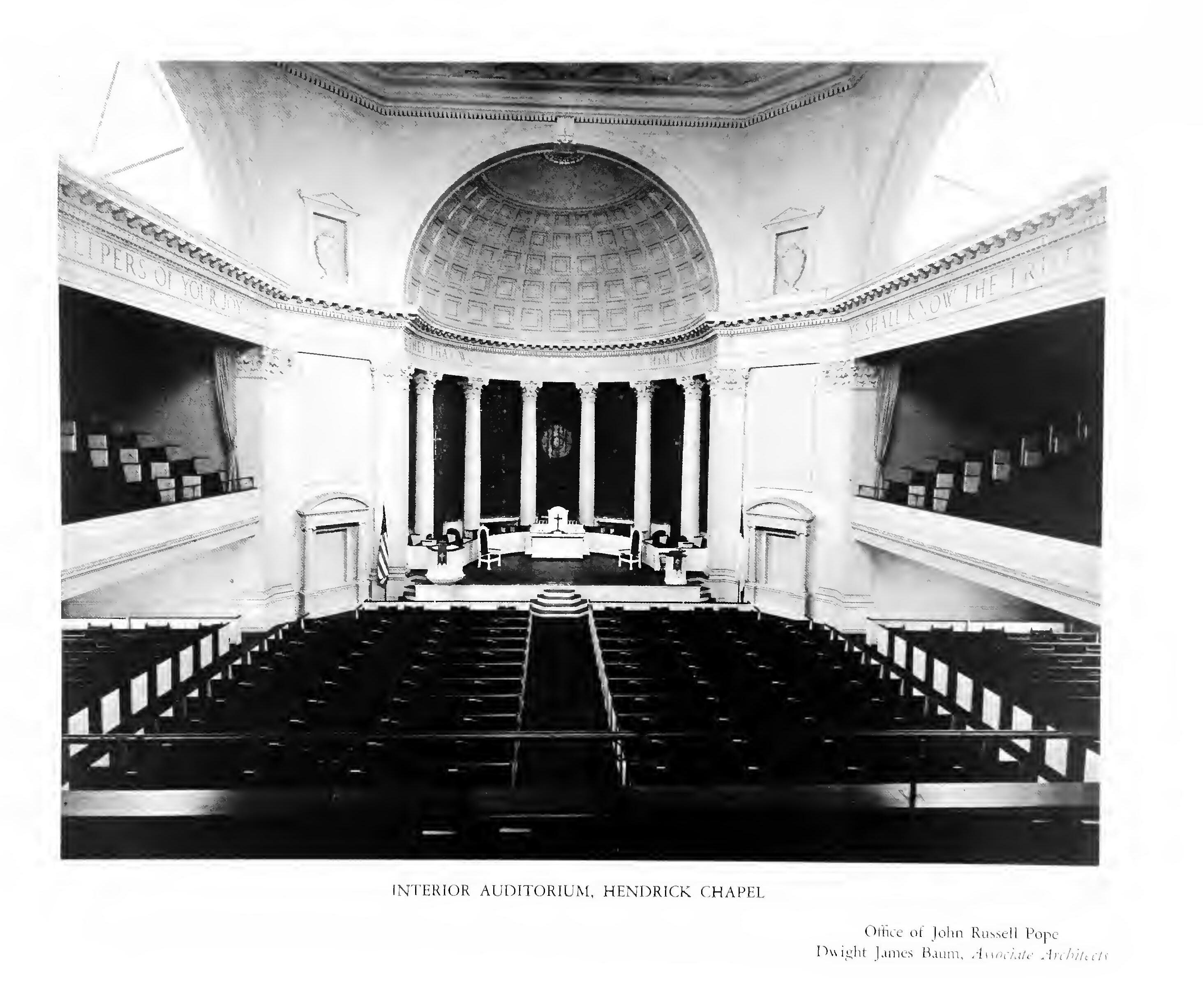
Interior auditorium of the Chapel in 1929.

The interior of the chapel is decorated with three verses in gilded lettering circle — two from the Gospel of John and one from 2 Corinthians – which are the building's only permanent religious symbol. The center aisle is 72-foot in length.

Miss Kathryn Hendricks, the Senator's niece, was present for the laying of the cornerstone on June 9, 1929 as well as at the dedication ceremony held on June 8, 1930, a month after the building was opened. She also donated the original Aeolian organ during the ceremony held on October 5 & 8, 1930. The pulpit was the gift of the Class of 1918.

=== Early programming ===
Prior the construction of the chapel, campus religious services were held in the old chapel on the top floor of Hall of Languages, and were moved to the Crouse College auditorium by president Charles Wesley Flint in 1926. William Harrison Powers, a Syracuse alum, who was teaching religion at Cornell University was persuaded by Dr. Flint into becoming the university chaplain and later was installed as the founding dean. The new chapel was intended to serve people from all faiths and remains a centerpiece of the Syracuse University campus. The chapel was built with the goal of it becoming "the heart of the campus", with the principle of providing a complete religious program for the university's students. The first student services were held on September 21, 1930. The chapel was established with a board made up of both faculty and students, and the program consisted of three phases: worship, religious education, and personal and social relations. The worship program included a regular Sunday service and a daily chapel service, and denominational counselors were provided by several different denominations to work with the chapel staff. According to an article in the New York Times, the Chapel regularly attracted 1,200 student by 1937. The Syracuse-in-China program was an outcome of a Hendrick chapel committee and it brought many Syracuse students to Chongqing, China, establishing a school there circa 1933.

In 1980, with the listing of the "Old Row" Comstock Tract Buildings on the National Register of Historic Places, the chapel was added as a contributing property.

== Chaplaincies ==
The Chapel is home to ten chaplaincies, including Baptist, Buddhist, Evangelical Christian, Hindu, Historically Black Churches, Jewish (Hillel), Lutheran, Muslim, Methodist, and Roman Catholic. The Muslim Fellowship was first added in 1957–58, with an Islamic chaplaincy being added in 1979. Hindu chaplaincy was inaugurated in 2023 out of the fellowship founded in 2018.

In addition, there are a number of student religious groups, including groups associated with the chaplaincies as well as Adventist, Christian Science, Hindu, Mormon, Muslim, Orthodox Christian, Pentecostal, and more.

=== List of Deans ===
The chapel adopted a policy that allowed for the appointment of a Dean who was not necessarily affiliated with the institution's traditional Methodist religious backing.

1. William Harrison Powers (Founding dean; 1929–1945)
2. Charles Casper Noble (1945–1967)
3. John "Jack" H. McCombe Jr. (1967–1980)
4. Richard L. Phillips (1981–1999)
5. Thomas V. Wolfe (1999–2013)
6. Tiffany L. Steinwert (2010–2015)
7. Brian E. Konkol (2017–2025)
8. Corey S. MacPherson (2026–)

== Events and current use ==
The Chapel has been a central part of the Syracuse University community since its opening, and has played host to numerous events, including religious services, town hall meetings, memorials ceremonies, concerts, lectures, protests, viral videos, performances, and community gatherings. In May 1970, the chapel was the staging site for about 2,000 Syracuse student striking to protest the U.S. military forces' bombing of Vietnam, and remained open 24 hours daily.

The Chapel celebrated its 75th anniversary in 2005 by hosting a series of events, including a community service symposium, a reception, a history exhibit, tours of the Chapel, and a lecture by a former SU professor. The anniversary celebration also featured a rededication ceremony, during which the Hendricks Chapel Choir debuted a new anthem composed especially for the occasion.

The chapel hosts annual Holidays at Hendricks concert series in December. Some of the performing groups include the University Symphony Orchestra, University Singers, The Hendricks Chapel Choir, Setnor Sonority, Crouse Chorale and the Morton Schiff Jazz Ensemble.

The chapel has hosted speakers from variety of backgrounds including politicians and government officials (Hillary Clinton, Ron Paul, Madeleine Albright), authors (George Saunders, Jelani Cobb Charles Blow & Ross Douthat), academics (David McCullough, Dacher Keltner), and public figures (Al Sharpton, Don McPherson Forest Whitaker, Soledad O’Brien & Wes Craven, Karen Armstrong), among others.

It has served as wedding venue for many connected to the university. The first ever wedding was officiated on September 20, 1930, just a day before chapel's first regular Sunday worship service. The first legal same-sex marriage in the chapel was hosted in May 2012 after it became legal in New York state in 2011.

=== Upgrades ===
Throughout the years, the Chapel has undergone several changes, including the replacement of the organ in 1952 with a Holtkamp Organ Company organ. In 1969, new office spaces were added at the cost of over $90,000.

In May 1968, what had been formerly called the Colonial room was renamed the Noble room to honor then recently passed dean Charles C. Noble. In 1980, Rena Pierson Dankovich Chapel was donated, along with vestments and religious articles serving the world's major faiths and in 1985 a five-year interior and exterior restoration effort was completed at the cost of $1.2 million. In 1999, a two-phase renovation began, which included the main office suite and the Noble Room. The Noble Room was equipped with new furnishings, a large screen projection system, internet access, a small stage area with lighting and also now equipped to display works of art.

In 2003, the chapel was upgraded with wireless internet capabilities. The renovation included the upgrade of technology and covered all rooms except the upper balcony.

The chapel underwent a thorough review in 2016, its first in 30 years. In October 2017, the front stairs of Hendricks Chapel were replaced. The then nearly 90-year-old limestone stairs were replaced by granite to preserve the historic look of the limestone while adding more strength. Two stainless steel handrails 5 feet apart were also installed across the steps to bring the stairs up to code.

=== People's place ===
People's Place is a non-profit, student-run café located in the basement of Hendricks Chapel. Established in 1971, the café offers cheap eats and snacks, including coffee, sandwiches, and pastries. The café operates independently from the university, offering a unique alternative to mainstream cafes, and all its profits go to Hendricks Chapel. People's Place maintains its independence and provides a relaxed atmosphere for students, while also supporting the mission of the Chapel. People's Place actively participates in issues both on and beyond University Hill, and has been known to close or offer free coffee and baked goods in response to important events on campus. People's Place aims to foster a sense of community for students and faculty members by providing a place to grab a coffee and have a conversation. The café underwent renovations to its kitchen and menu in 2019.

== Awards ==
In 2018, due to the success of its Dean's Convocation program, the chapel received a prestigious Outstanding Spiritual Initiative Award for promoting spiritual and religious growth on a college campus from the National Association of Student Personnel Administrators' Spirituality and Religion in Higher Education Knowledge Community.

== See also ==
- Archbold Gymnasium
- Comstock Tract Buildings
- Steele Hall
- List of Registered Historic Places in Onondaga County, New York
