= Old Oval =

Former football stadium at Syracuse University

- The Old Oval and other Syracuse University buildings (Steele Hall, Crouse College, Women's Gymnasium, Hall of Languages) in the background, c. 1898-1907.
- Interactive map of Old Oval
- Location: 113 Crouse Dr; Syracuse, NY 13244
- Coordinates: 43°2′15.4″N 76°8′02.4″W
- Owner: Syracuse University
- Operator: Syracuse University

Construction
- Opened: June 8, 1895
- Closed: 1907
- Demolished: 1929 (filled with earth)

Tenant
- Syracuse Orangemen

Old Oval, also called The Oval or University Oval, was a multi-purpose stadium in Syracuse, New York. The field, located open field south of the Hall of Languages, opened in 1895 and was the first on-campus home to the Syracuse Orangemen (Note: The school did not adopt its current nickname of "Orange" until 2004.) football team prior to the opening of Archbold Stadium in 1907.

== History ==
The Old Oval at Syracuse University has a rich history dating back to the 1880s, when it was first developed as a baseball diamond and cinder track. The oval-shaped field was roughly laid out in 1887. The field originally was a crop field.

At the time, most team sports were played in the various "Star Parks" around the city of Syracuse, but the university, under presidents Charles N. Sims and later James Roscoe Day, wanted to make the Oval the center of athletics on campus. To achieve this goal, work was started in the fall of 1887 on the sloped baseball ground and track and field commenced in the spring of 1890 with regrading of the field. Finally, on June 8, 1895, the Oval officially opened as the new athletic field. It was financed by John D. Archbold, who refused to let the field be known by his name. In 1895, the grandstand was constructed and the field was formally opened on June 8, 1895, with George H. Bond serving as the master of ceremonies. Archbold later donated $600,000 to build the Archbold Stadium.

This was the Orangemen's first real home field. In the first game played at the stadium on 1895, the 1895 Syracuse Orangemen football team beat Syracuse Athletic Association by a score of 24–0.

Other sports programs also used the field, notably, three-time Olympic gold medallist and Syracuse student Myer Prinstein amazed the crowds at track and field meets.

== Later use ==
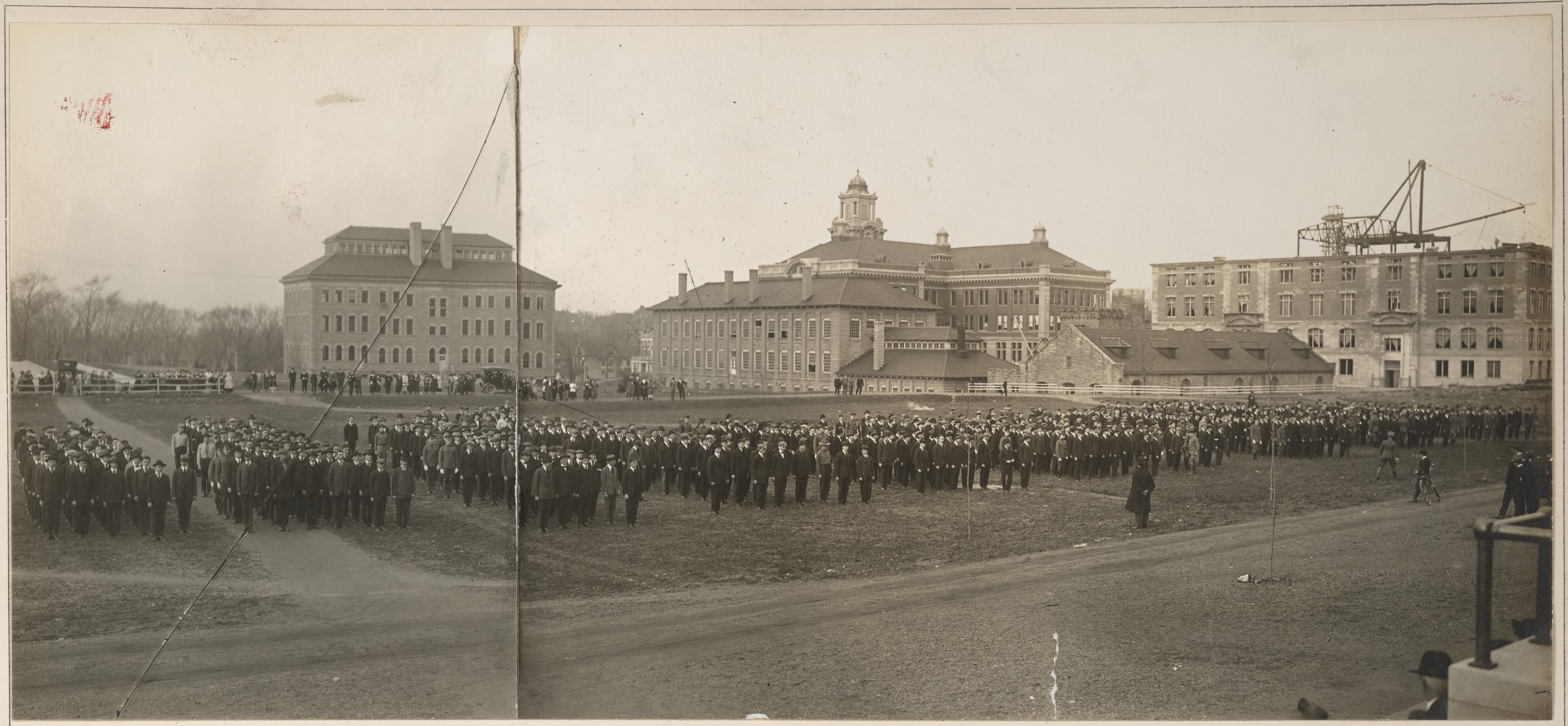
Syracuse University ROTC students Assembling on the old oval in 1917.

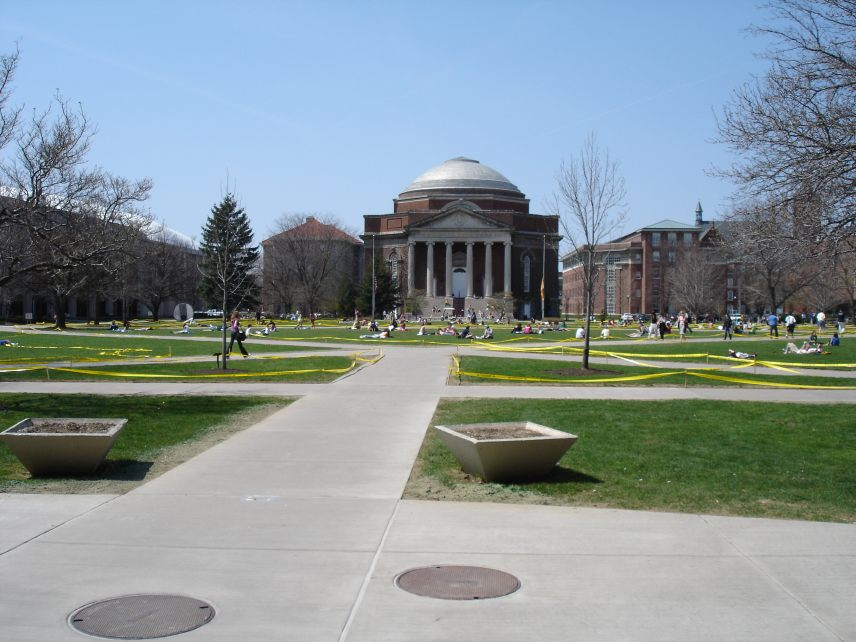
Shaw Quad in Spring 2005, with Hendricks Chapel at the western end.

However, in 1907, most Syracuse Orange athletic events were moved to the newly built Archbold Stadium, which was considered a more suitable location for such events. No longer an athletic field, the Old Oval was put to variety of uses over the years.

In 1906, architecture professors Frederick William Revels and Earl Hallenbeck, created a plan to convert the Old Oval into a Great Quadrangle. Their work resulted in the construction of Bowne, Carnegie library, Sims, and Machinery halls and Archbold Gymnasium, which were all completed by 1909. It has served as a 200 ft. by 150 ft. rose garden, a skating rink, and was even used for military drills during World War I. It was also the terminus of a toboggan slide from Mount Olympus. By 1914, the Oval had come to be known as the "Old Oval", and in 1929 it was filled in with earth from various excavations to create the central lawn area known simply as the quad.

The quad was the site of the 1970 student strike following the Kent State massacre and the site of Sheets of Expression, in which students spontaneously taped bed sheets to the sidewalks and wrote their observations following the 9/11 attacks.

On November 6, 2010, the Old Oval was dedicated as the Kenneth A. Shaw Quadrangle, honoring the former Syracuse University chancellor. Today, the Shaw quad, as it is more commonly called, is a popular spot on campus for students to relax, study, and socialize. It is now an open green space bounded by Hendricks Chapel, Link Hall, Carnegie Library, Hinds Hall and Huntington Beard Crouse Hall.

Events and tenants
Preceded by Star Park	Home of Syracuse Orange football 1895 – 1906	Succeeded by Archbold Stadium
