= Crouse College =

- Crouse College, Syracuse University
- U.S. National Register of Historic Places
- New York State Register of Historic Places
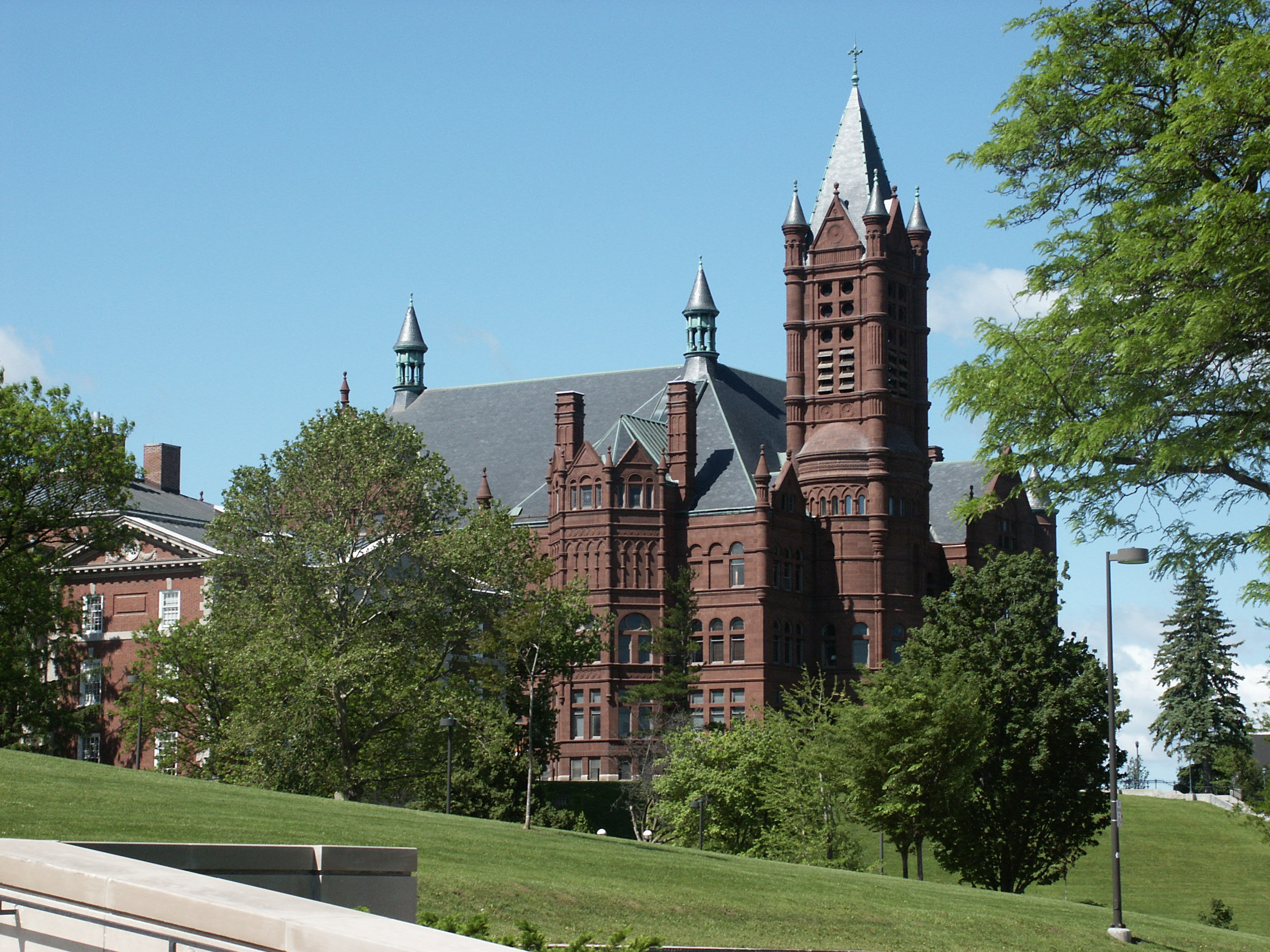

- Location within New York Location within the United States
- Location: Syracuse, New York
- Coordinates: 43°2′18.51″N 76°8′14.08″W
- Built: 1889; 137 years ago
- Architect: Archimedes Russell
- Architectural style: Romanesque Revival—Richardsonian Romanesque
- Part of: Syracuse University – Comstock Tract buildings (ID80004279; listed separately in 1974)
- NRHP reference No.: 74001285
- NYSRHP No.: 06740.000008

Significant dates
- Added to NRHP: July 30, 1974
- Designated NYSRHP: June 23, 1980

Crouse College, also known as Crouse Memorial College and historically as John Crouse Memorial College for Women, is a building on the Syracuse University campus. It was funded by John R. Crouse, a wealthy Syracuse merchant who was the principal donor along with the White family who were bankers and served as secondary donors. It was designed by Archimedes Russell and is in the Romanesque Revival—Richardsonian Romanesque style.

The building was listed on the National Register of Historic Places in 1974. It is also one of the historical Comstock Tract buildings on the Syracuse campus. It currently houses Syracuse University's College of Visual and Performing Arts. Chiefly, its classrooms and auditorium are at the service of the Setnor School of Music.

== History ==
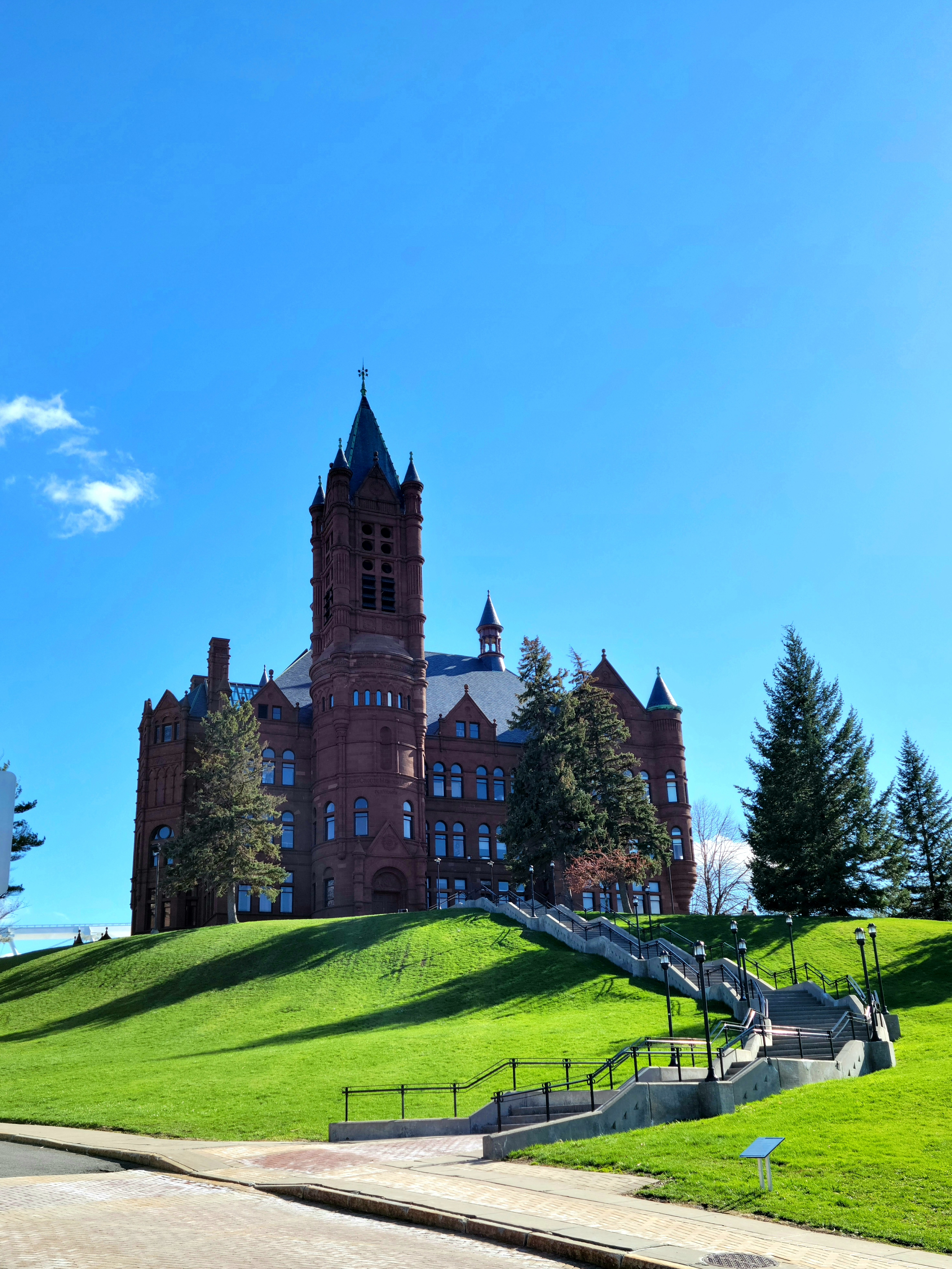
Crouse College as seen from South Crouse Ave (north).

Crouse College was home to the first College of Fine Arts in the United States and now is known for both its College of Visual and Performing Arts and the Rose, Jules R., and Stanford S. Setnor School of Music.

=== Construction ===
The first cornerstone for the new college was laid in June 1888, and the building was completed in September 1889 by the Norcross Brothers of Massachusetts at the cost of $500,000. It was a gift from local merchant and banker, John Crouse. The elder Crouse was a trustee of the university and built the college as a memorial to his late wife. The university originally announced that it will be dedicated on June 22, but Mr. Crouse showed displeasure that the building would be dedicated before completion and Chancellor Sims backed down, with dedication taking place on September 18, 1889. The architect, Archimedes Russell, was not restricted as to cost by the donor, and cost exceeded the planned budget.

At the time of construction, it was the third building on campus and the highest structure in the city. It was built in the Romanesqueue Revival style "with High Victorian Gothic qualities." The structure is supported by a "stout" granite foundation and the exterior is covered with Longmeadow brownstone. Architectural details include high roofs, gables, dormer windows and rounded arches. The interior is "distinctively" Romanesque and carved hardwood woodwork designs, representative of the period, are displayed throughout.

The building was intended for use as a women's college and was originally named the John Crouse Memorial College for Women; however, John Crouse died during its construction and his son D. Edgar Crouse opened the institution for use by both men and women.

==== Restoration ====
The Crouse College underwent renovation in 2001, 2004, and most recently in 2019. The three cupolas were removed and restored in 2019.

== Features ==
=== Setnor auditorium and the pipe organ ===
An auditorium seating about 700 people was included, although intended at first as a chapel. The auditorium underwent a renovation in 1998, which included replacing the seats with wooden chairs reminiscent of the originals, cleaning the chandeliers and organ pipes, and refinishing its hardwood floors.

There is a pipe organ in the auditorium which is one of America's most important historic instruments. It was originally installed by the Roosevelt Organ Works of New York city in 1889 and was rebuilt by the Estey Organ Company of Vermont in 1924. The Holtkamp Organ Company upgraded the organ in 1950 which incorporated electro-pneumatic controls. The 3,823-pipe organ retains many of the original pipes. It represents a style of American organ building that flourished in the mid-20th century and is closely associated with builder Walter Holtkamp. It is widely considered to be his magnum opus.

=== Bell tower ===
The bell tower of the building housed the first "tower chimes" installed in Syracuse, which is still in use today. The original nine bells (later 10, then 14) ranged in weight from 375 to 3,000 pounds, and were manufactured by Clinton H. Meneely Bell Company of Troy, N.Y. A student group The Chimesmasters from the Setnor School of Music are responsible for ringing of the chimes regularly throughout the academic year and for special occasions. In 2014, they hosted a concert to celebrate the bell towers' 125th anniversary.

=== Sculpture and stained glass ===
Winged Victory, a sculpture that was modeled after the original, which was discovered in the Mediterranean Sea and since moved to the Louvre, is located at the bottom of the main staircase. The building also contains stained glass "associated with religious subject matter and spiritual renewal." The stained glass was designed by Richard Wolff, a former faculty member, and students from the college's School of Art and Design and was installed in 1970.

== Gallery ==
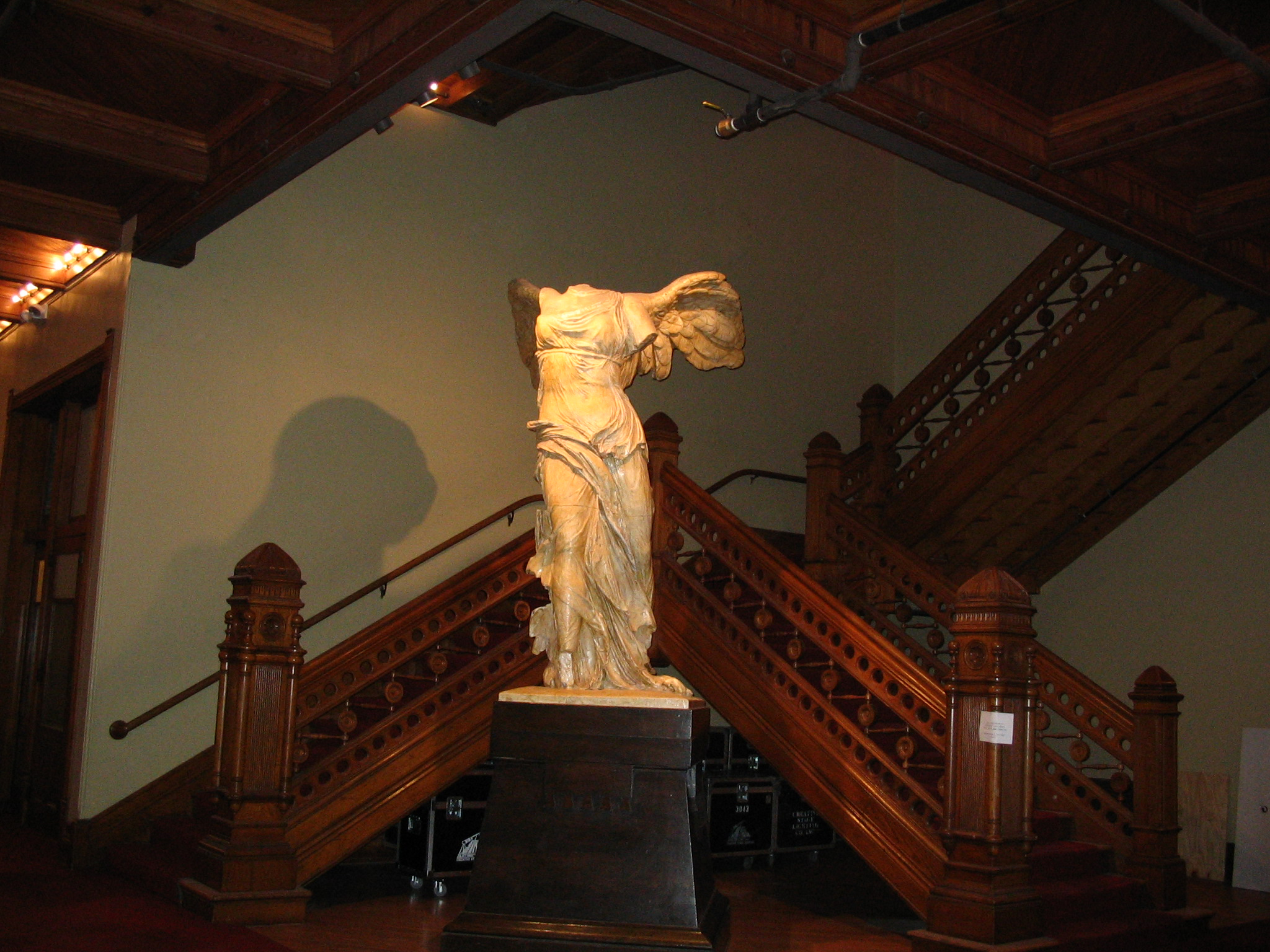

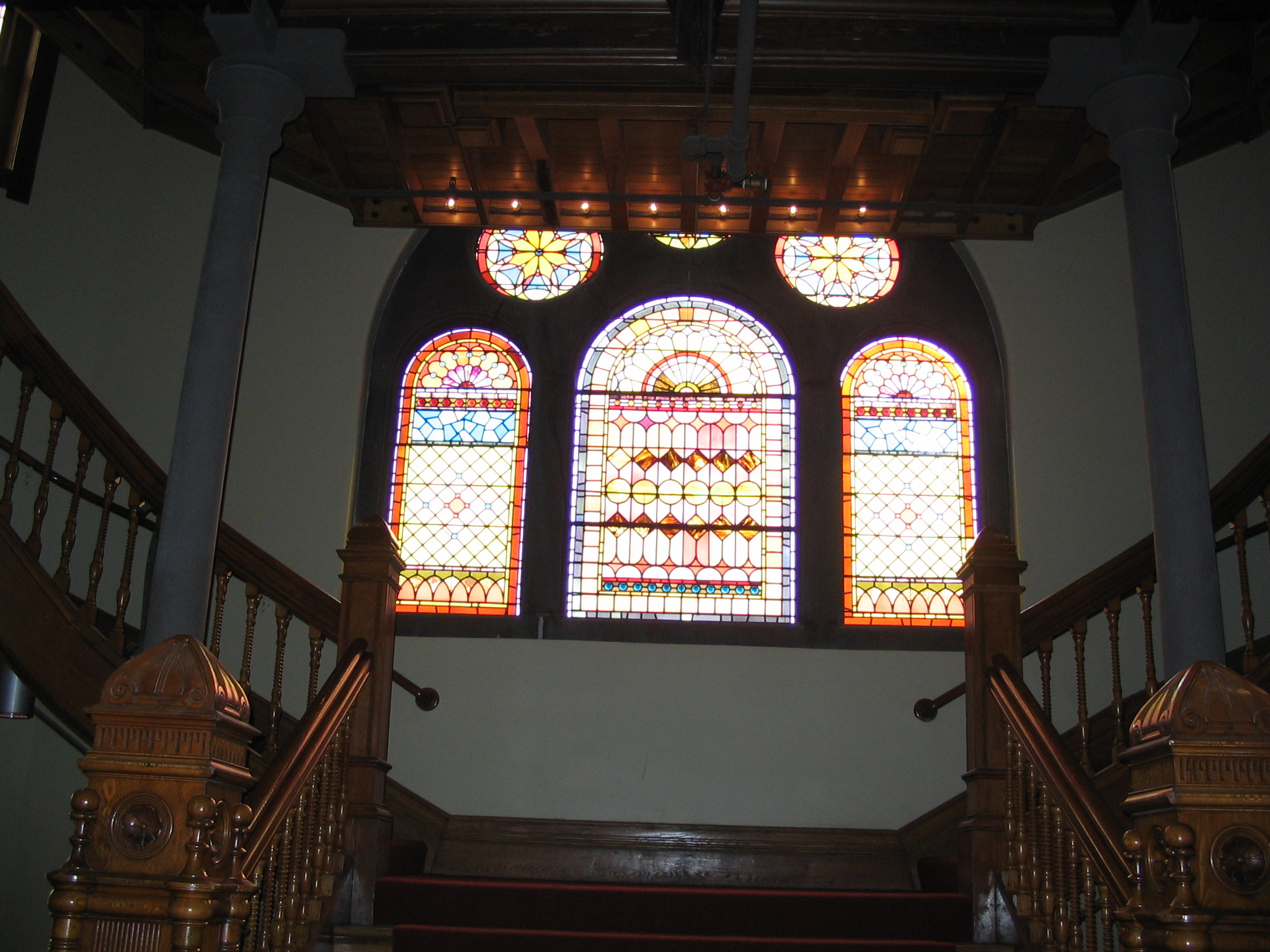

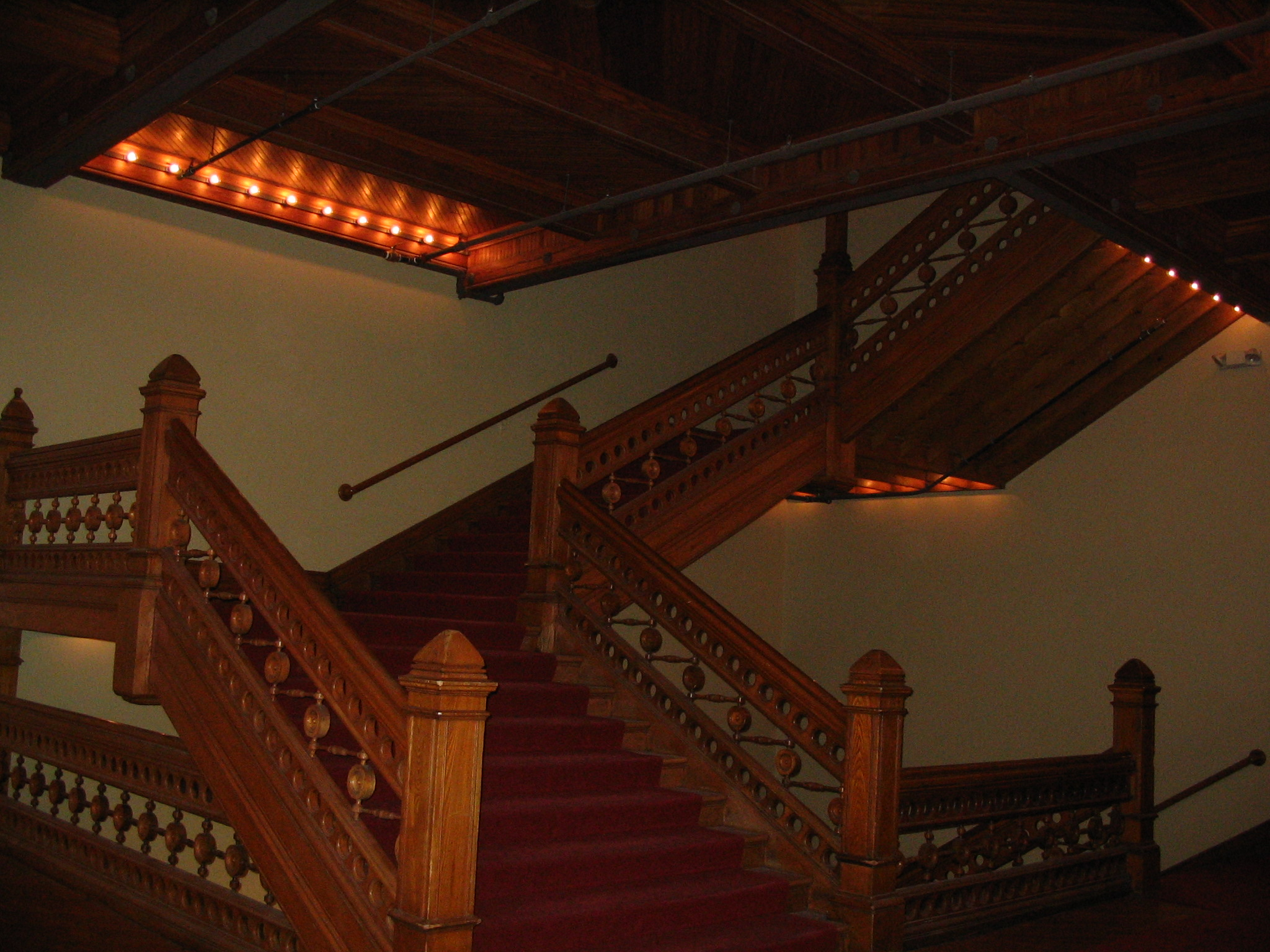

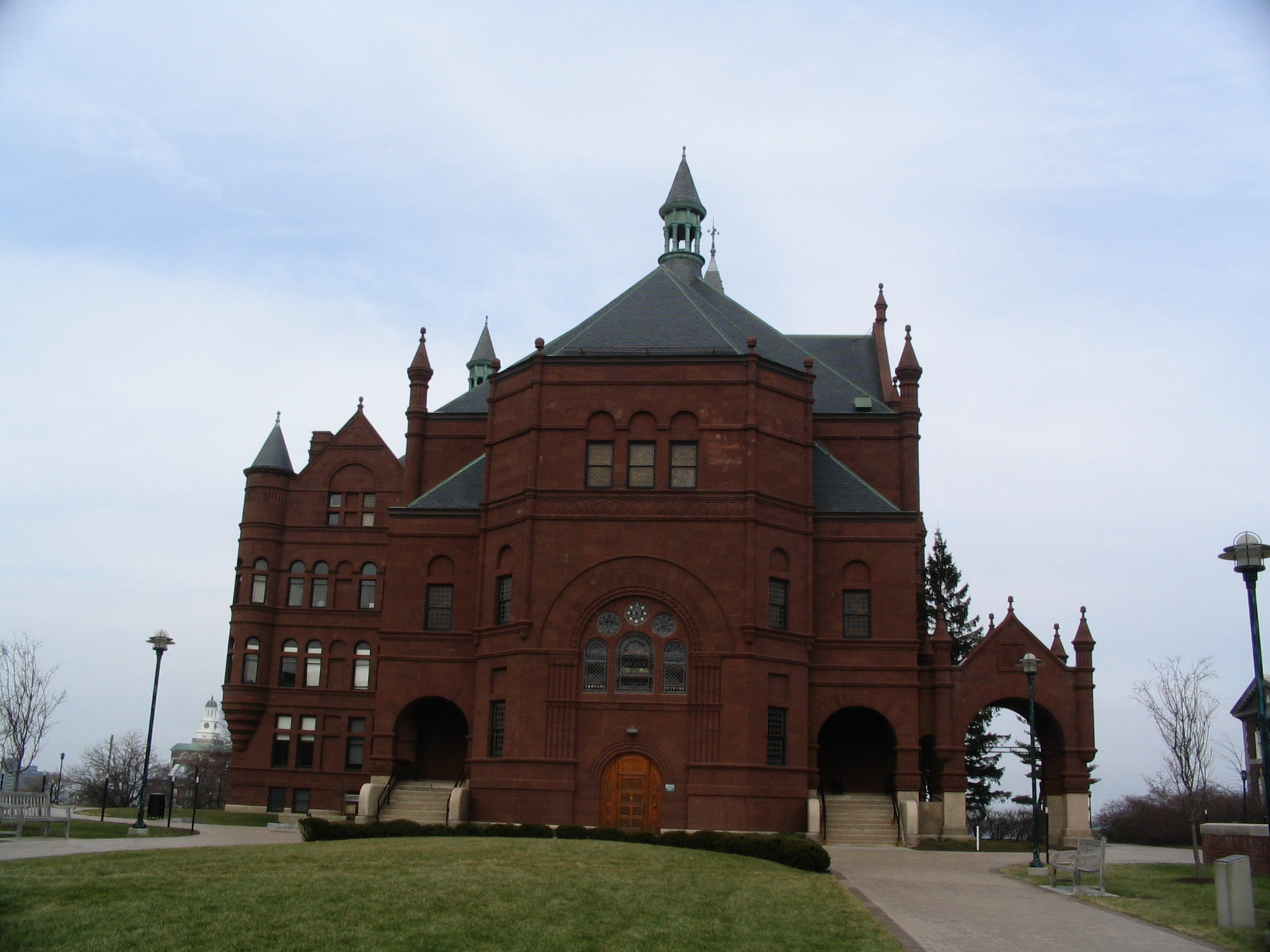

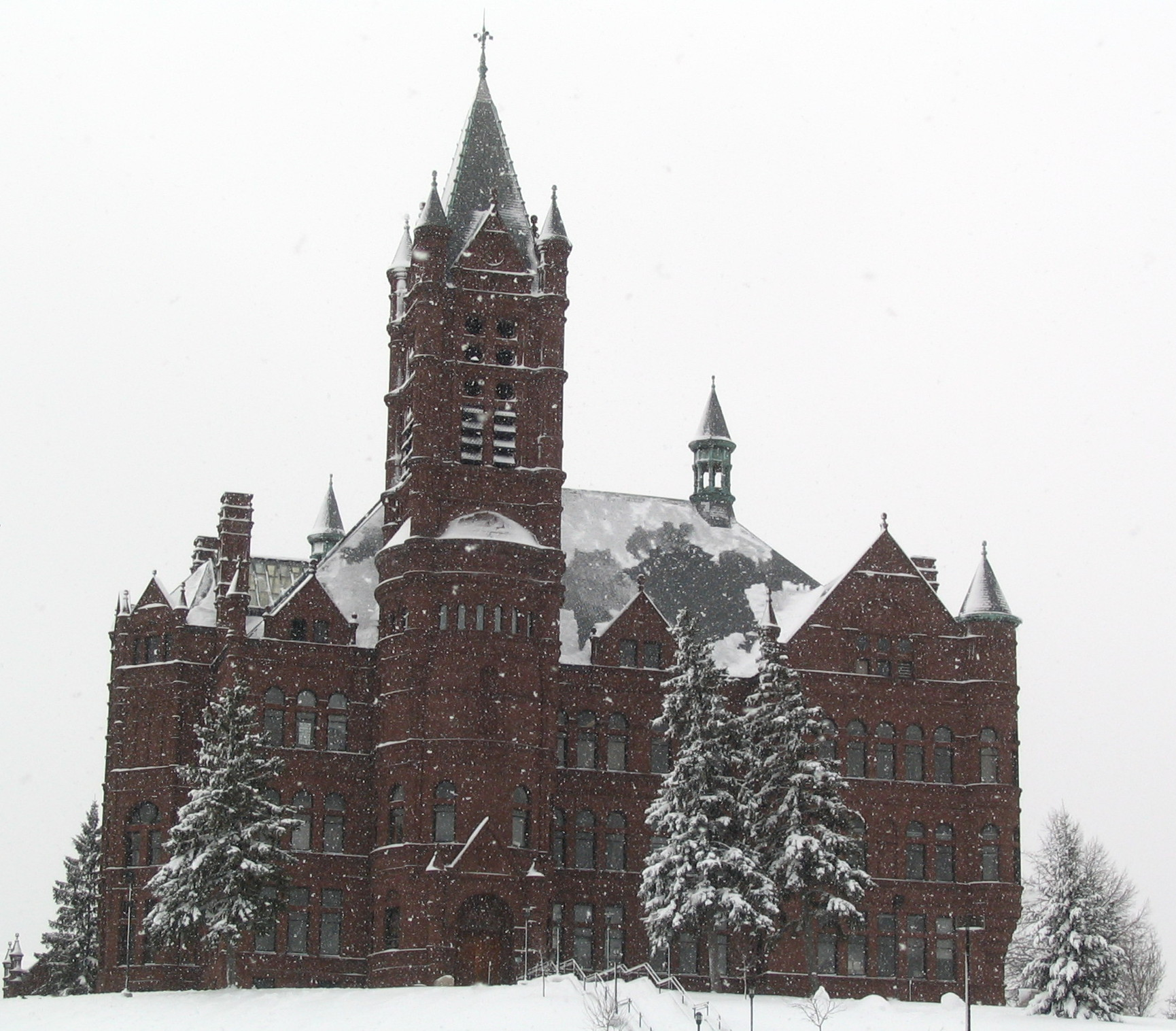

== See also ==
- Archbold Gymnasium
- Comstock Tract Buildings
- Hendricks Chapel
- Steele Hall
- List of Registered Historic Places in Onondaga County, New York
