= NotAgainSU =

Student protest movement at Syracuse University

#NotAgainSU is a hashtag and student-led protest movement, led primarily by Black students, that formed at Syracuse University in November 2019 after a series of racist and bias-related incidents were reported on and near campus. Beginning on November 7, 2019, more than 30 incidents of racist, antisemitic, and homophobic vandalism and harassment were reported on campus and in the surrounding area. The movement occupied two university buildings: an eight-day sit-in at the Barnes Center at The Arch in November 2019, and a 31-day occupation of Crouse-Hinds Hall in February and March 2020, one of the longest student protests in the university's history. Organizers presented Chancellor Kent Syverud with a list of 19 demands; on November 21, 2019, Syverud signed 16 of the demands unchanged and modified the other three, citing the limits of his authority. The protests drew national attention and resulted in commitments from the university, including an external review of the Department of Public Safety (DPS) led by former U.S. Attorney General Loretta Lynch.

== Background ==
In 2014, a coalition of more than 50 student organizations called THE General Body formed at Syracuse University around concerns about transparency from the university administration. On November 3, 2014, following a Diversity and Transparency Rally on the steps of Hendricks Chapel, protesters walked to Crouse-Hinds Hall to deliver a 45-page document of grievances, needs, and solutions, and found the building's doors locked. Protesters later entered the building and began a sit-in that lasted 18 days, ending on November 20, 2014.

The group's grievances included greater transparency in student services, university policy, and university finances; more training and knowledge on marginalized identities and experiences; improved mental health services; supportive spaces for international students; improvements for graduate employees and commuter students; increased library funding; the hiring of a director for an Asian and Asian-American studies minor; and the addition of hate speech to the student code of conduct as prohibited language. The university responded to some of the grievances in the following years, including creating a Chancellor's Workgroup on Diversity and Inclusion, holding a diversity summit for students, granting salary increases proposed for graduate student employees, and expanding mental health services.

In April 2018, the university suspended the activities of the Theta Tau engineering fraternity after videos surfaced showing members using racial slurs and mocking marginalized groups in skits, which Syverud called "extremely racist, anti-Semitic, homophobic, sexist and hostile to people with disabilities"; the incident prompted campus protests and a sit-in, and 15 students were later suspended.

A 2021 report of independent counsel Loretta Lynch found that THE General Body's demands touched on themes similar to those later raised by #NotAgainSU, including transparency about the role of the Department of Public Safety, and that the 2014 occupation informed both the administration's unwillingness to permit another occupation of Crouse-Hinds Hall and the tactics protesters adopted in 2020. The report also identified the Theta Tau videos as among the events that shaped student perceptions of the department before the fall 2019 incidents.

== Timeline of events ==
On November 7, 2019, racial slurs targeting Black and Asian people were found written in bathrooms on two floors of Day Hall, a first-year residence hall. University officials did not notify the broader campus community until four days later, initially responding with a private meeting for residents of the affected floors at which a residential staff member urged students not to publicize the incident. The delay drew criticism from students. In a November 11 email, the vice president for the student experience said the university regretted the limited reach of its initial communication, and Syverud wrote the following day that university leadership should have communicated more swiftly.

Additional incidents were reported through mid-November, including graffiti targeting Asian people in the university's physics building and a swastika drawn in snow near student housing. On November 13, students began a sit-in at the Barnes Center at The Arch under the name #NotAgainSU, and organizers drafted a list of 19 demands addressing diversity and the treatment of students of color at the university. The sit-in brought together students of many backgrounds, including Indigenous, Black, Asian American, Latino, Jewish, Muslim, and international students, and campus groups across the political spectrum voiced support.

On November 16, a Black student was verbally harassed near campus by a group that included fraternity members and guests; in response, the university suspended the social activities of all fraternities for the remainder of the semester. On November 18 and 19, a manifesto allegedly connected to the Christchurch mosque shootings circulated on a Greek-life message board and was AirDropped to students in the university library. Syracuse police said the document appeared to be a copy of the Christchurch attacker's manifesto and that preliminary information indicated no direct threat to the university; state police and the Federal Bureau of Investigation joined the investigation, and DPS offered a $50,000 reward for information.

The incidents and protests received national news coverage, and political figures commented on the university's response. Governor Andrew Cuomo criticized Syverud's handling of the incidents and urged the board of trustees to bring in an independent monitor, Senators Kirsten Gillibrand and Chuck Schumer condemned the incidents, and presidential candidates Joe Biden, a graduate of the university's law school, and Kamala Harris expressed support for the students. On November 19, Syverud announced commitments including at least $1 million toward developing a diversity curriculum, changes to the Student Code of Conduct addressing consequences for hate speech, and a diversity and inclusion training requirement for incoming faculty and staff.

On November 20, hundreds of students attended a forum with Syverud at Hendricks Chapel. When Syverud declined to immediately sign the demands as written, protesters walked out of the building and marched to the chancellor's residence before returning to the Barnes Center. The following day, Syverud signed 16 of the 19 demands without changes and edited the other three. Organizers rejected his response and continued to call for his resignation; the university disputed the organizers' statement that no negotiation had taken place at the forum. The sit-in ended after eight days, and on November 25 Syverud announced additional security measures, including doubling campus safety patrols. In December 2019, #NotAgainSU staged a walkout calling for the resignations of Syverud, DPS chief Bobby Maldonado, senior vice president Dolan Evanovich, and DPS deputy chief John Sardino, and delivered resignation letters addressed to the four administrators.

On February 17, 2020, #NotAgainSU began a second sit-in at Crouse-Hinds Hall, which houses the chancellor's office. When the building closed that night, the university suspended more than 30 students who remained inside for violating the campus disruption policy. Organizers said the university was enforcing the policy inconsistently, since it had not been applied during the November sit-in, and more than 2,400 people signed a petition to reinstate the suspended students. University officials offered to revoke the suspensions of students who left the building voluntarily, to support daytime protests in the building, and to relocate overnight protests to a 24-hour library; organizers rejected the offers, saying the purpose of the protest was disruption. Syverud later lifted the suspensions. The morning after the occupation began, DPS restricted access to the building, preventing food, medicine, and other supplies from entering, and officers were involved in physical altercations with students outside. After a video circulated showing Sardino reaching toward his holster during one altercation, the university announced an external review of DPS led by Lynch.

On February 26, after the university did not meet a deadline protesters had set for beginning negotiations, more than 100 demonstrators blocked a nearby intersection for two hours; university officials said the negotiations had not been previously agreed upon. The university agreed to begin negotiations shortly afterward. Over four sessions, the university committed to requiring diversity training for faculty without tenure, hiring five more counselors, and updating its policy governing peaceful protest; the movement's demands to disarm DPS and for a university statement acknowledging a role in white supremacy were not met. Nearly 100 graduate students began a strike in support of the movement's demands, and supportive faculty led a march across campus.

The occupation continued through a spring break that the university extended in response to the COVID-19 pandemic. The sit-in ended on March 18, 2020, after 31 days, when organizers held a virtual meeting with university officials to confirm commitments on their revised demands; the university had announced that classes would move online for the remainder of the semester.

== Demands ==
#NotAgainSU protesters presented a list of 19 demands to the university, later expanded to 34 after Chancellor Syverud signed the initial list. The demands focused on improving the experiences of marginalized students and expanding university-wide education on diversity with a focus on anti-racism.

Protesters called for sanctions for students involved in hate crimes and bias-related incidents proportionate to their level of involvement; reform of SEM 100, the university's required seminar course for first-year students; and mandatory faculty and staff training on diversity and anti-racism. Additional demands included stronger anti-harassment policies; open forums for addressing grievances from marginalized students; and regular, published progress updates from the university.

Housing-related demands included prioritizing disabled students in the housing selection process and adopting roommate-selection platforms to allow students to select roommates with similar backgrounds and interests. Protesters also sought increased funding for counseling services that better represent marginalized students, development of a multicultural center, recognition of multicultural Greek life, and increased financial aid for students of color.

Protesters also addressed administrative and DPS processes, seeking timelier responses to racial incidents on campus and greater transparency. They called for an external review of DPS and sought the removal of several administrators, including Syverud, Evanovich, Maldonado, and Sardino.

== Results of the protests ==
=== First Year Seminar ===
A new required course for first-year students, First Year Seminar (FYS 101), replaced SEM 100 with the goal of educating students on diversity and inclusion on and off campus. Students and #NotAgainSU organizers criticized the course as too similar to SEM 100 and said its curriculum omitted the protests that led to its creation.

=== Community review board ===
Following the external review of DPS by Loretta Lynch, the university created a community review board for the department based on her recommendations. The board consists of 11 members, five students and six university employees, and reviews officer conduct based on complaints from community members, issuing written reports and recommendations to the chancellor. Lynch's report recommended against disarming DPS, which some protesters had demanded, citing the university's open campus and crime in the surrounding area, but advised that DPS should generally avoid sending armed officers to peaceful student demonstrations.

=== 119 Euclid Avenue ===
In September 2021, the university opened a center dedicated to the Black student experience at 119 Euclid Avenue, created in response to the movement's demand for dedicated spaces for multicultural students. University officials said the space was designed to be largely student-run, with students leading decisions on its programming and decor. As part of the same commitment, the university renovated the neighboring building at 113 Euclid Avenue for its Native Student Program and opened an Intercultural Collective space in the Schine Student Center. By its second anniversary in 2023, the space included an art collection and a memorial room honoring victims of police brutality and gun violence. In January 2024, following a $1 million donation from Sharon Barner, a university trustee and 1979 graduate, the center was renamed the Barner-McDuffie House in honor of Barner and her husband.

=== Other commitments ===
The university also added penalties for bystanders to hate crimes to its Code of Student Conduct and allocated $600,000 to a city volunteer program.
