= Comstock Tract Buildings =

Buildings at Syracuse University, New York

Coordinates: 43.03766198°N 76.13400936°W

- Syracuse University-Comstock Tract Buildings
- U.S. National Register of Historic Places
- U.S. Historic district
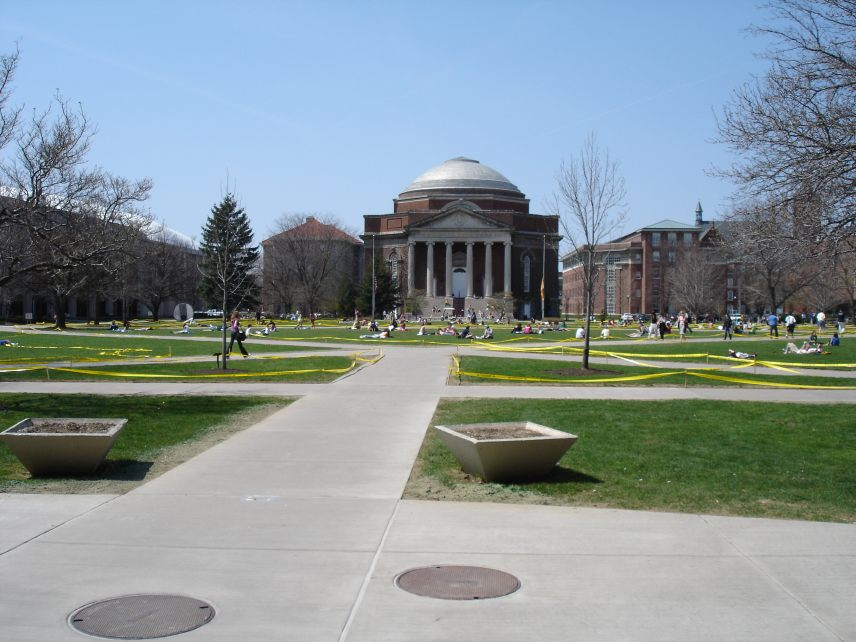
- Hendricks Chapel on the Quad

- Location within New York Location within the United States
- Location: Syracuse University campus, Syracuse, New York
- Built: 1887
- Architect: Multiple
- Architectural style: Classical Revival, Renaissance Revival, Romanesque Revival
- NRHP reference No.: 80004279
- Added to NRHP: July 22, 1980

The Comstock Tract Buildings of Syracuse University are a set of buildings that were listed on the National Register of Historic Places in 1980.

The name assigned in the listing was "Syracuse University-Comstock Tract Buildings". Included in the registration are 15 buildings, all located on the original Syracuse University campus, a tract of land originally donated by George F. Comstock. The buildings include what has been known as the "Old Row".

- Archbold Gymnasium (1907)
- Bowne Hall (1907)
- Carnegie Library (1907)
- Crouse College (1888–89) (separately listed on the NRHP in 1974)
- Hendricks Chapel (1933)
- Hall of Languages (1873) (separately listed on the NRHP in 1973)
- Holden Observatory (1887)
- Maxwell Hall (1937)
- Lyman C. Smith Hall (1902)
- Lyman Hall of Natural History (1907)
- Machinery Hall (1907)
- Sims Hall (1907)
- Slocum Hall (1919)
- Steele Hall (1898)
- Tolley Administration Building (1889)

== Gallery ==
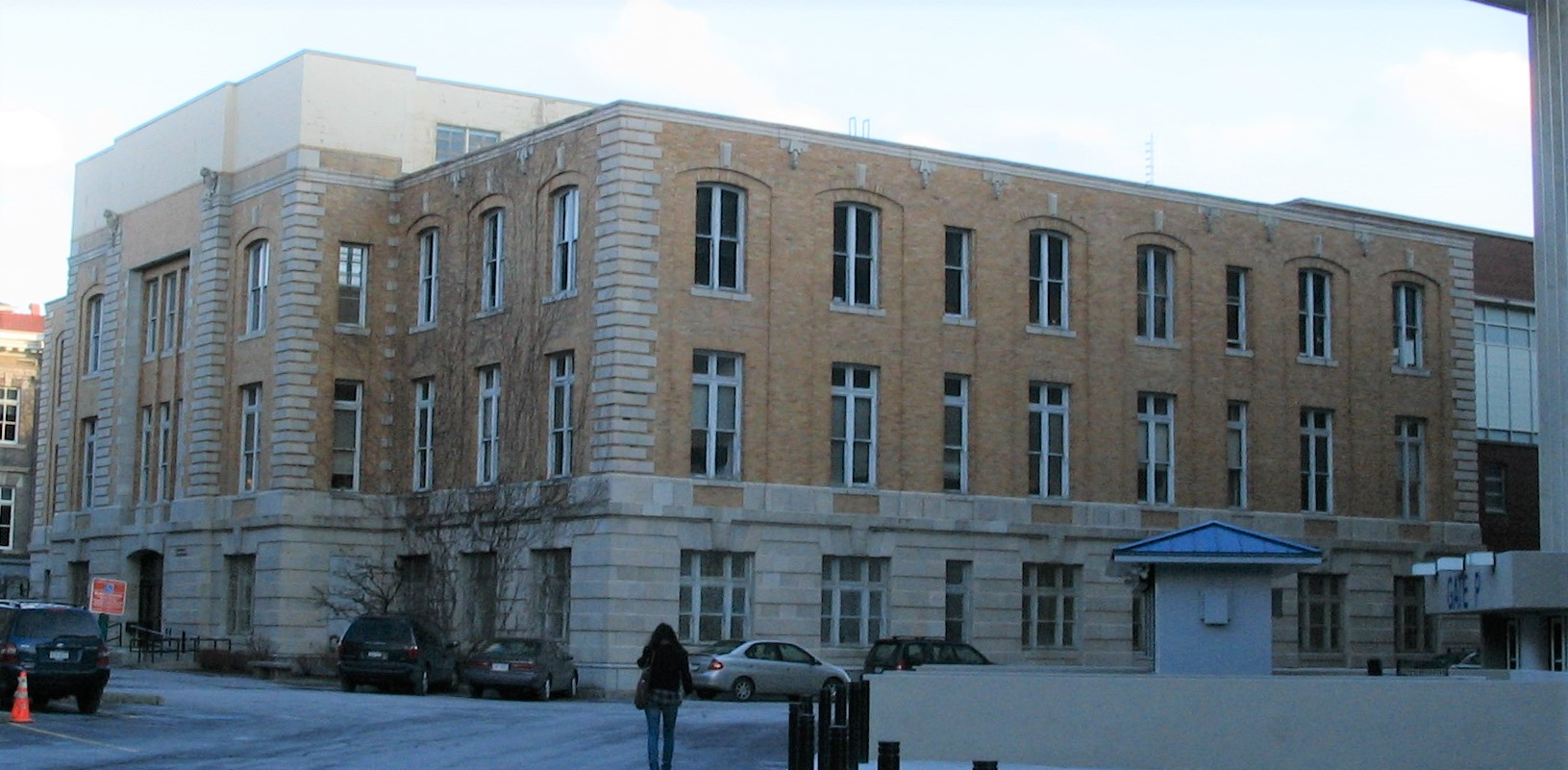
Archbold Gymnasium

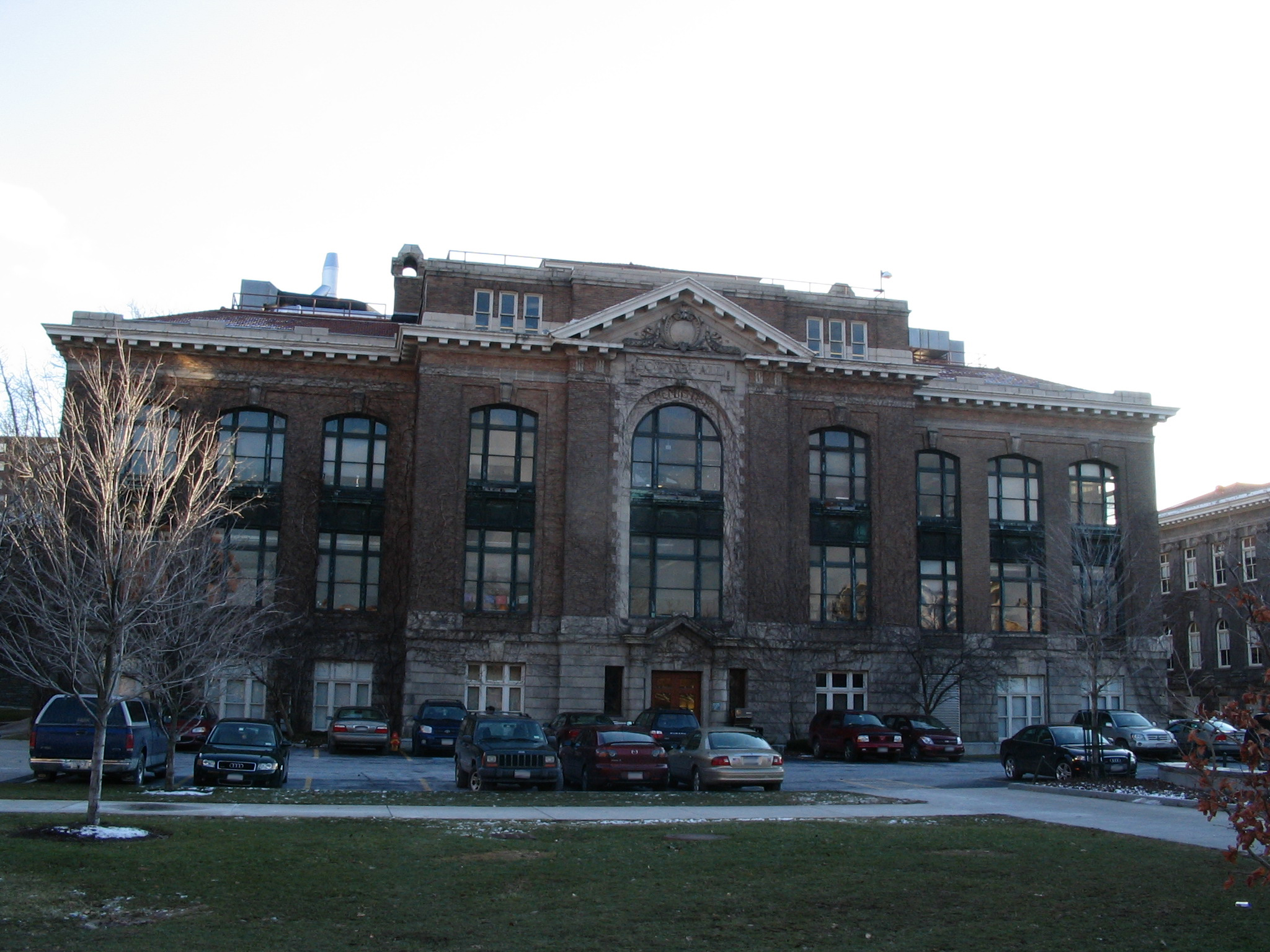
Bowne Hall

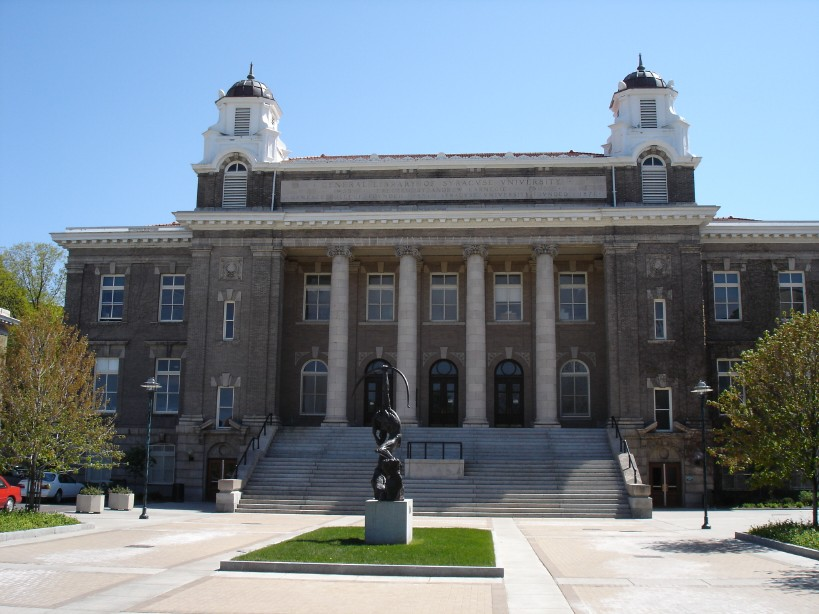
Carnegie Library

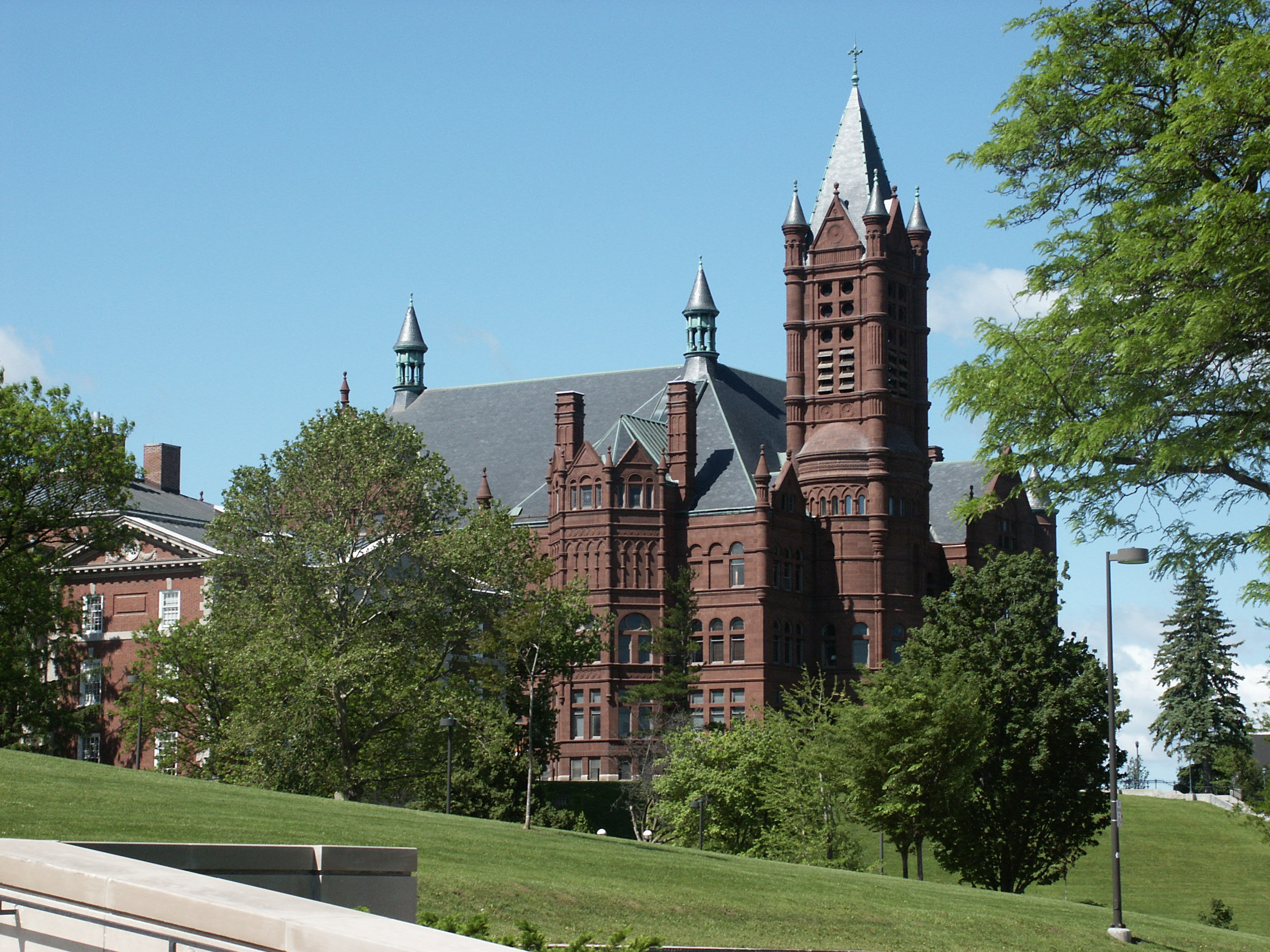
Crouse College

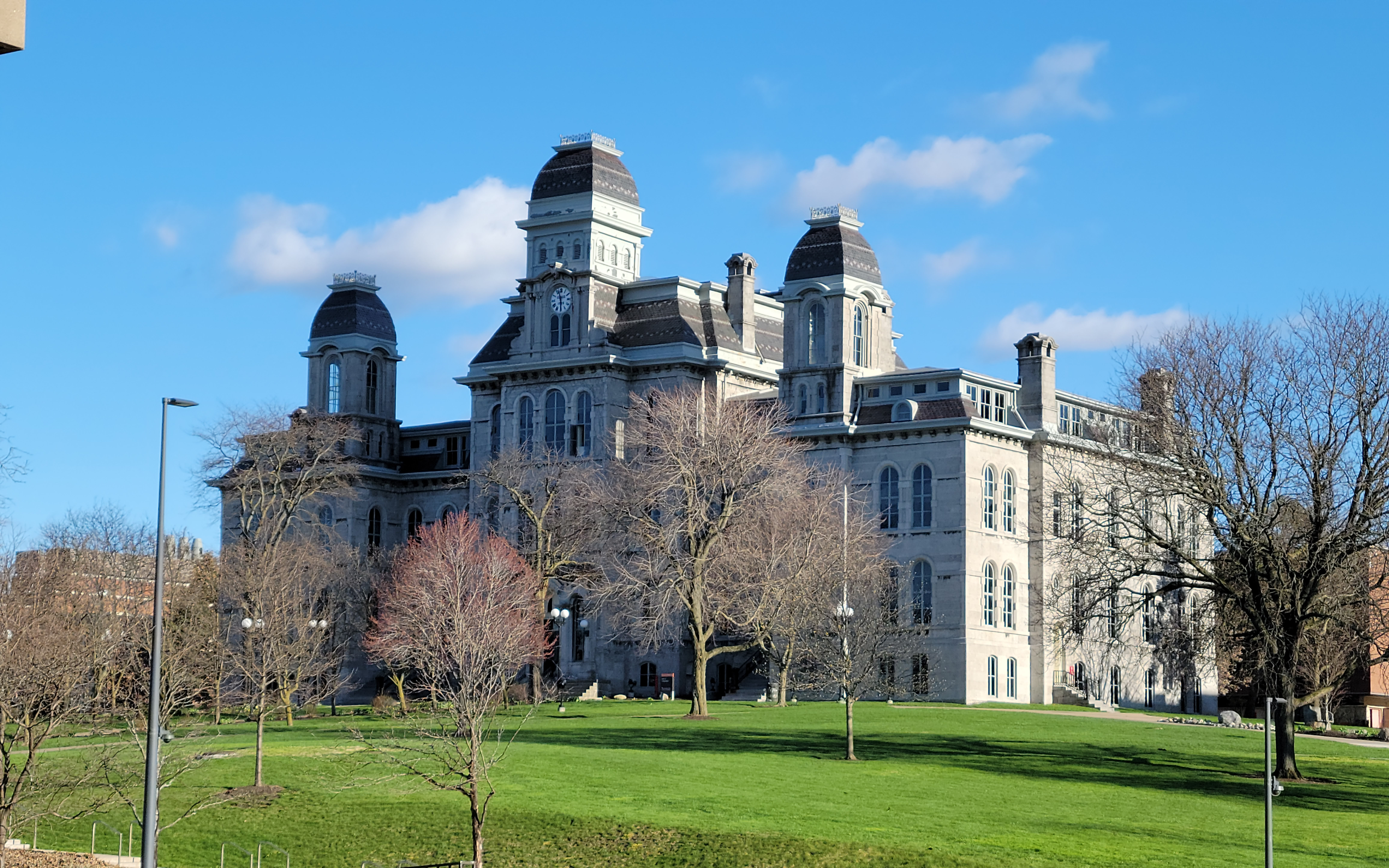
Hall of Languages

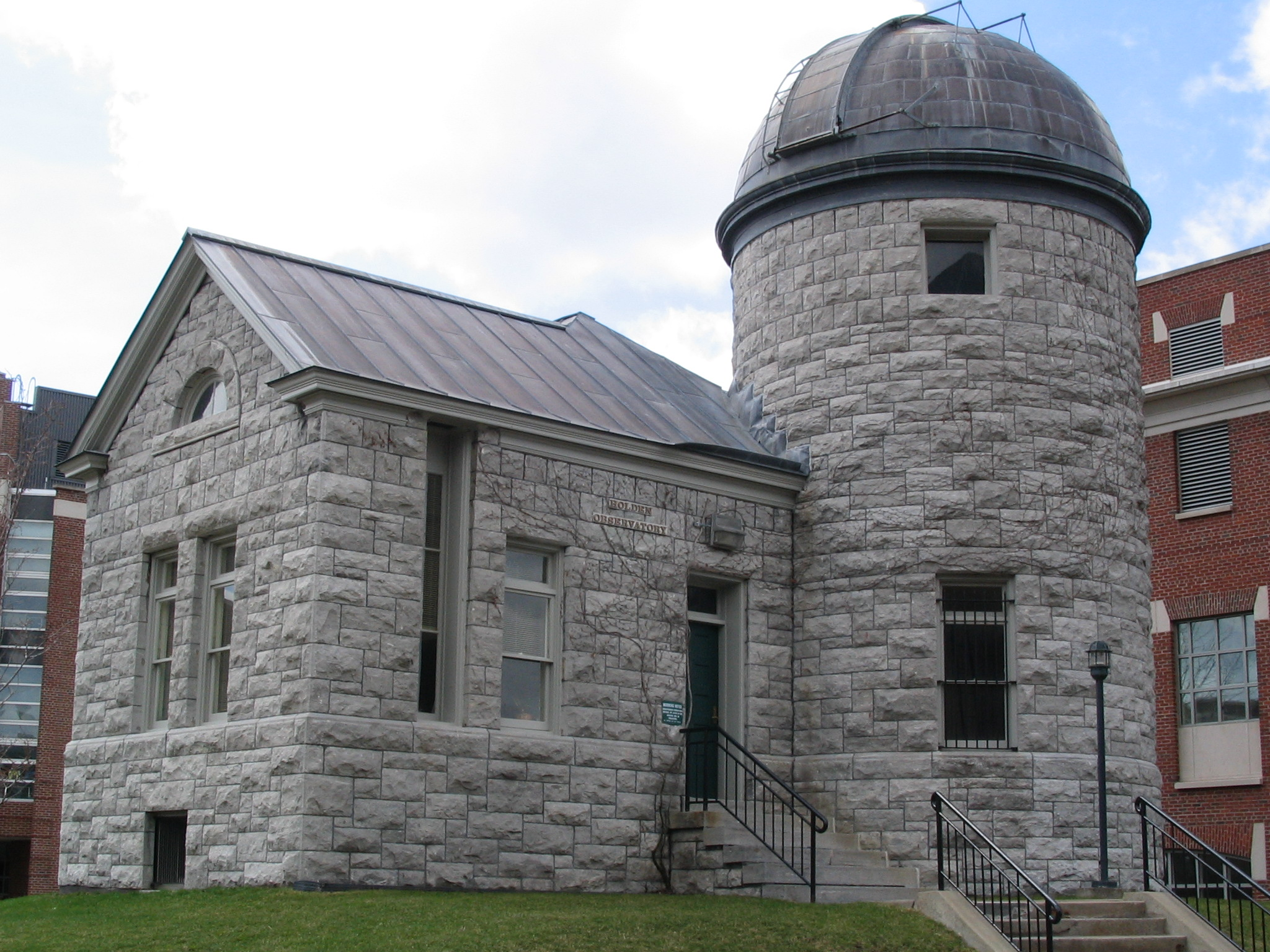
Holden Observatory

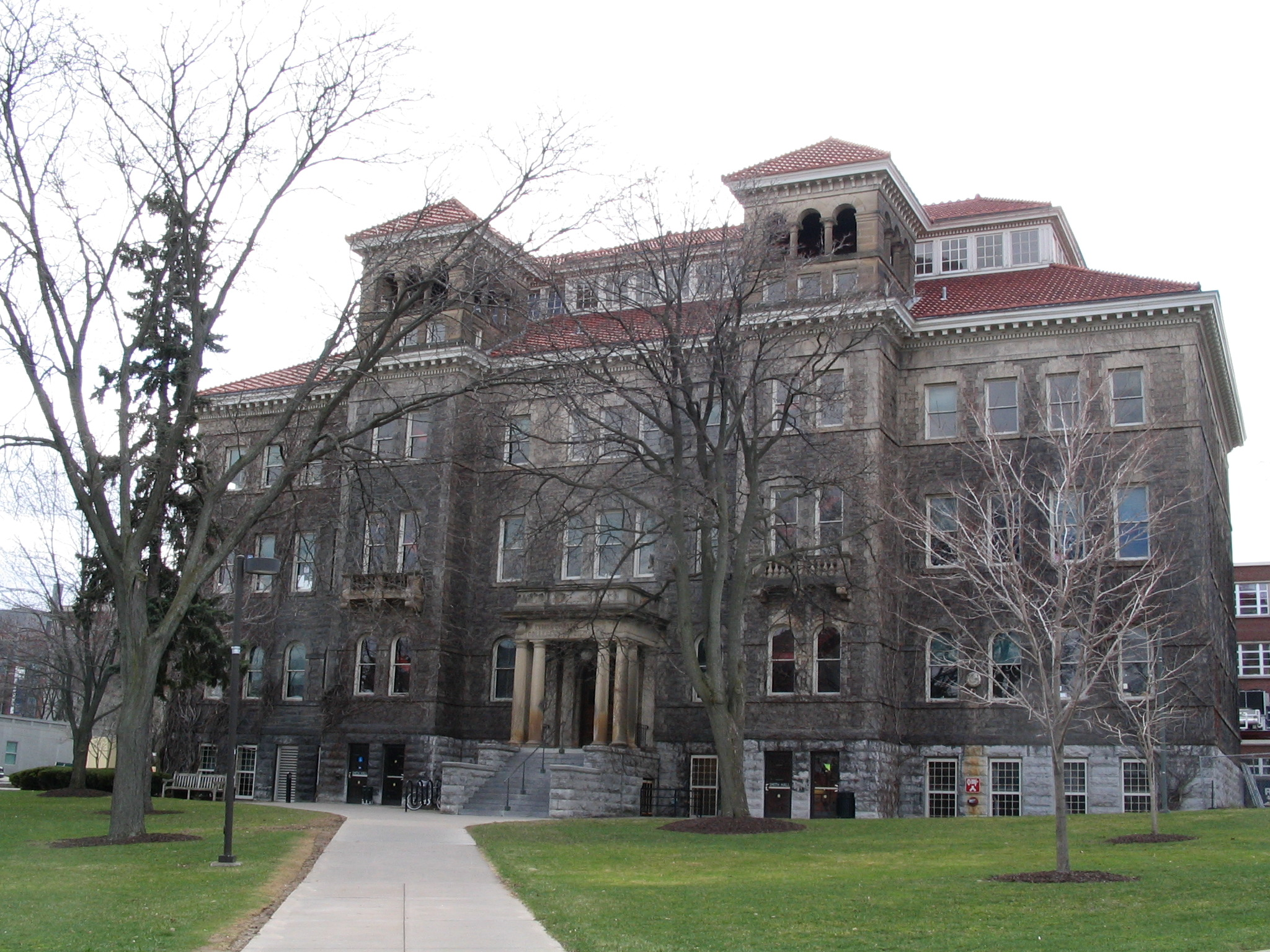
Lyman C. Smith Hall

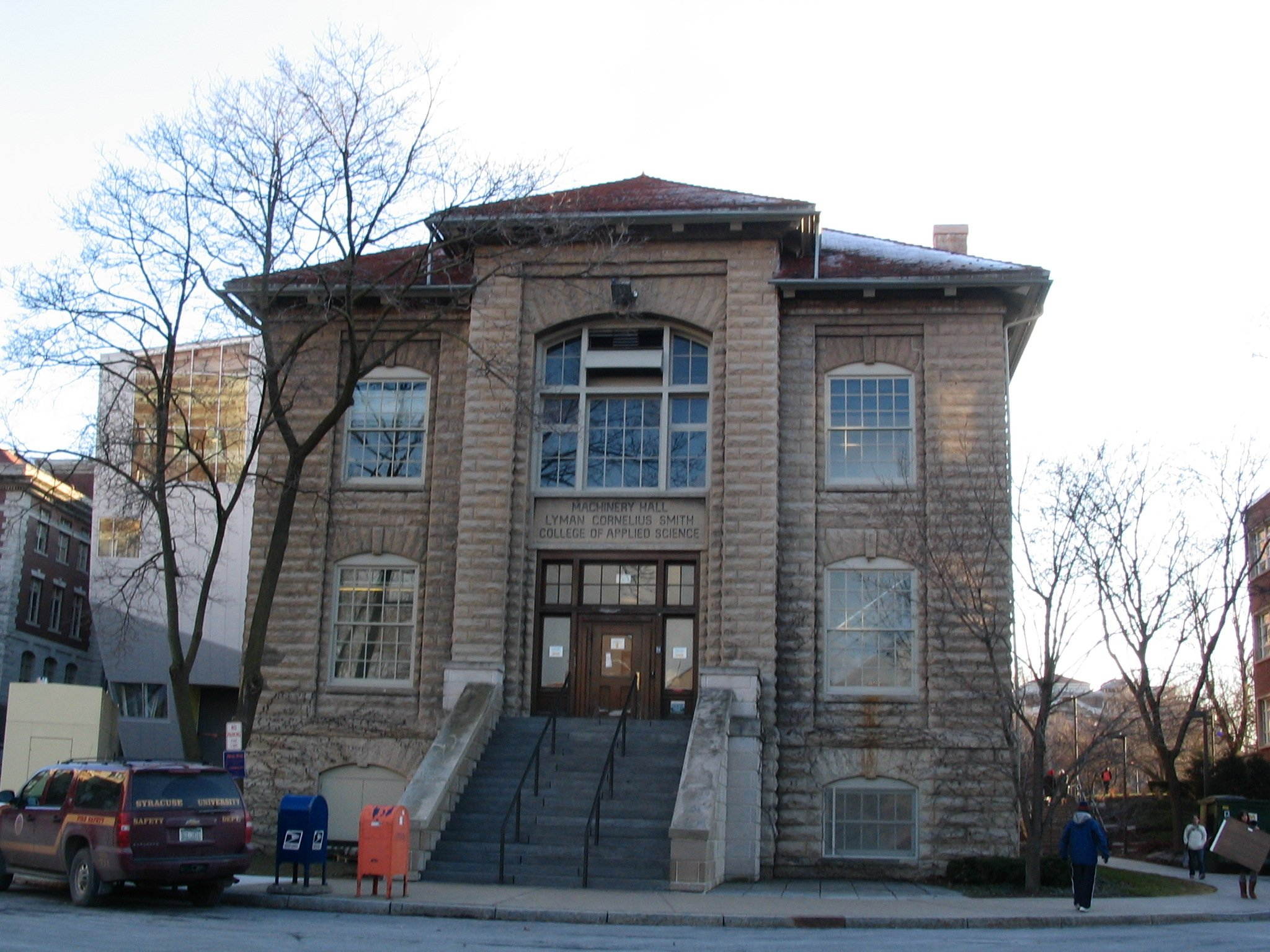
Machinery Hall

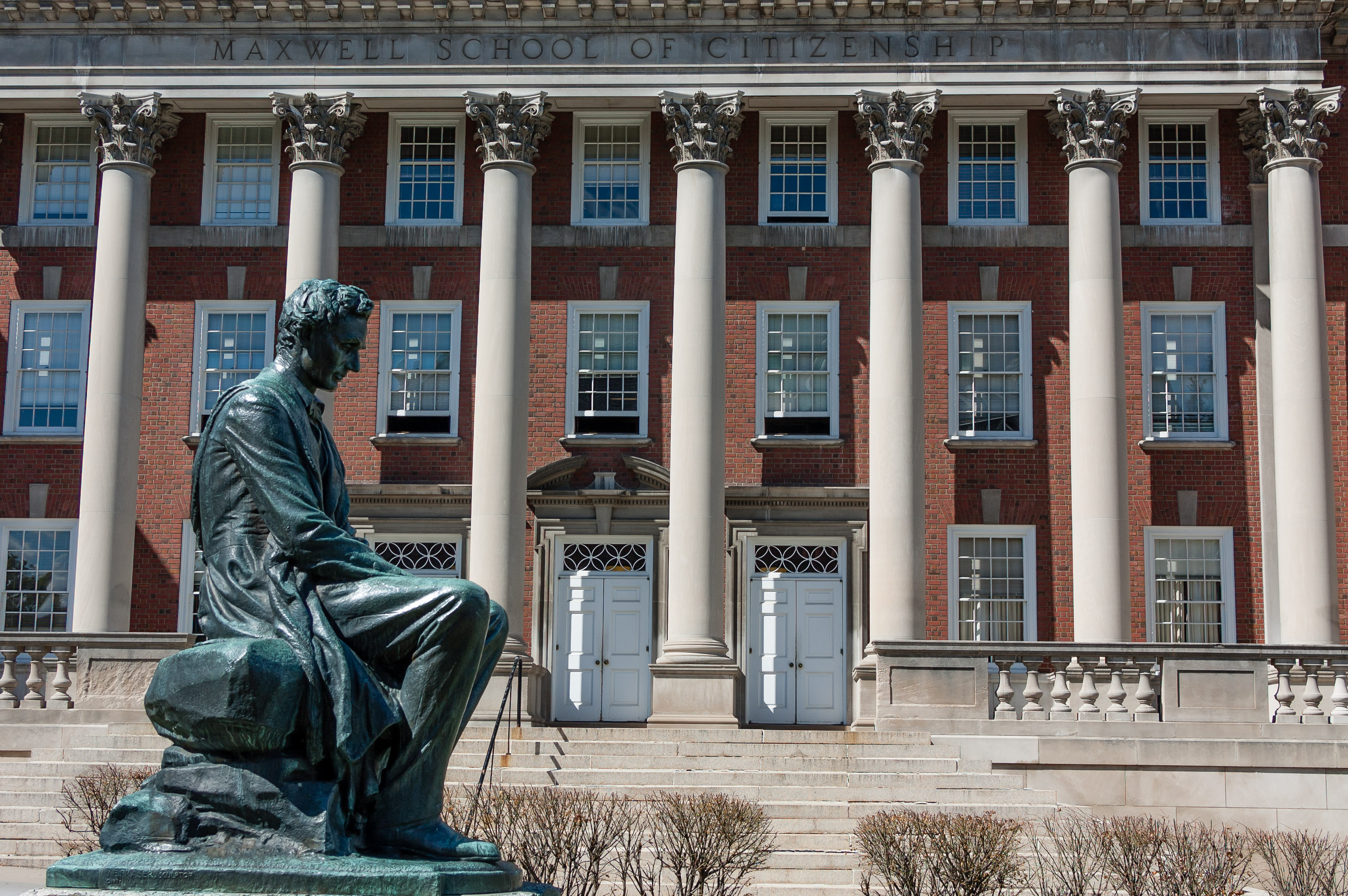
Maxwell Hall

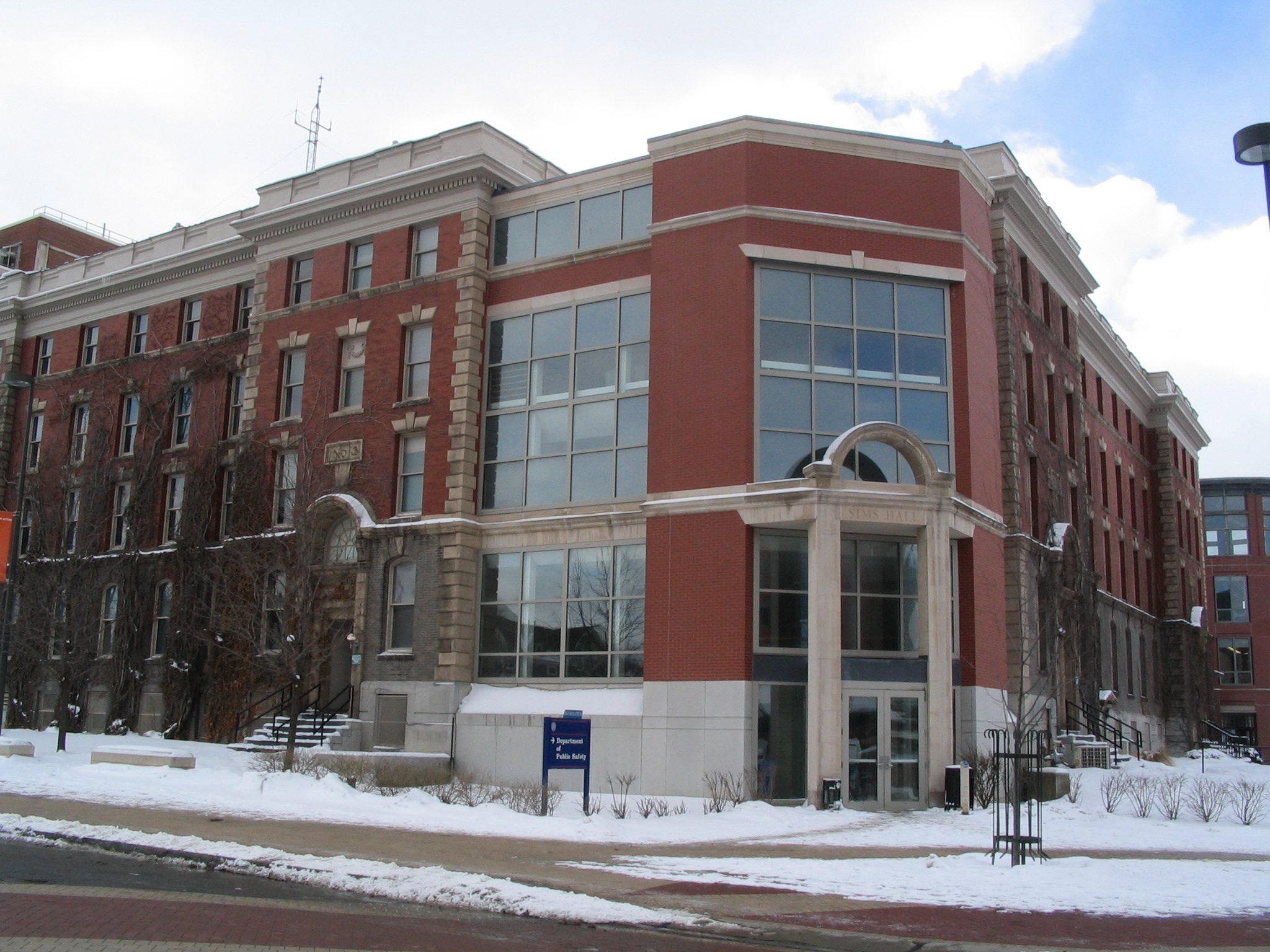
Sims Hall

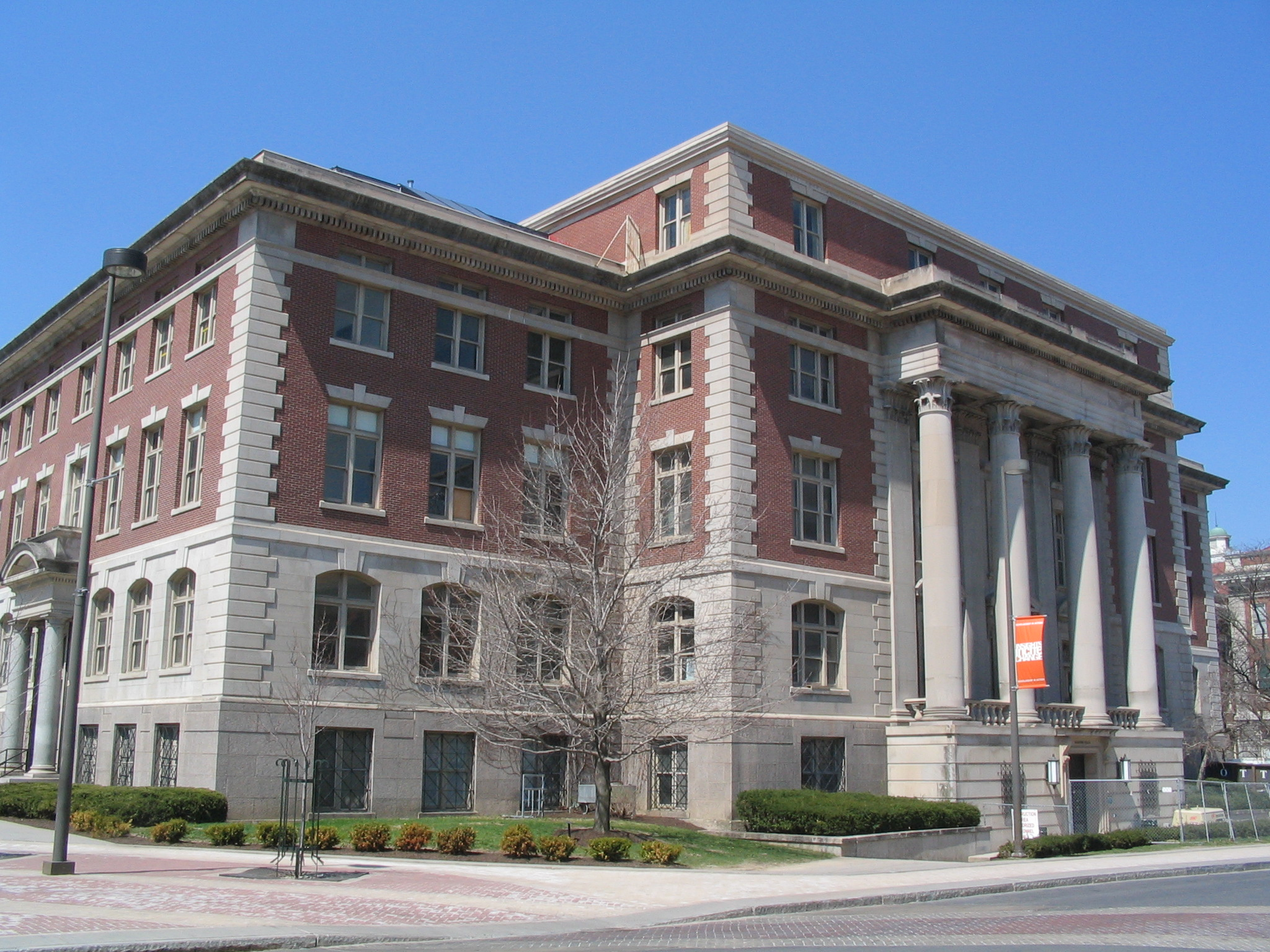
Slocum Hall

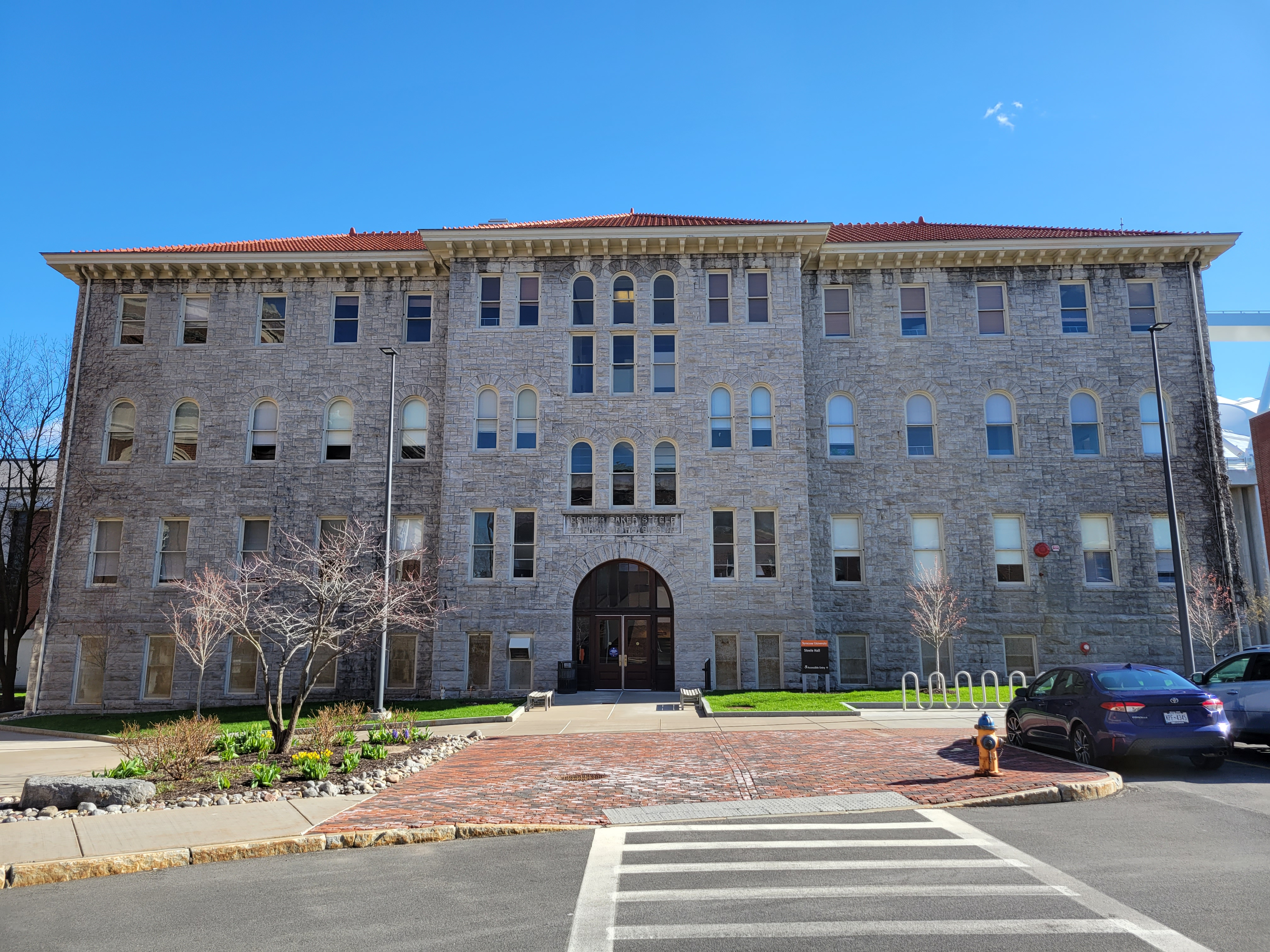
Steele Hall

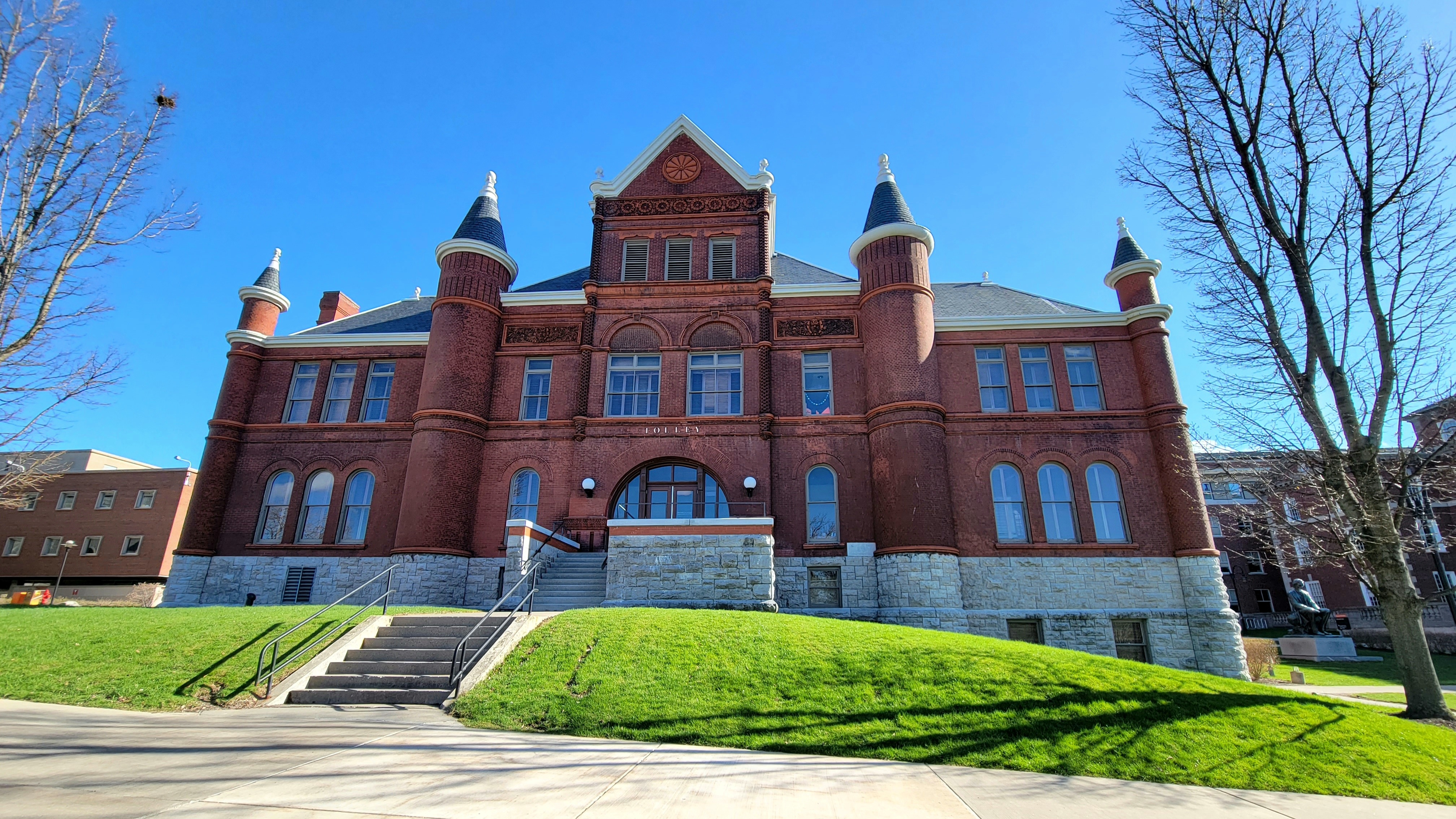
Tolley Administration Building

== See also ==
- List of Registered Historic Places in Onondaga County, New York
- List of Syracuse University buildings
