= Setnor School of Music =

Music School of Syracuse University in Syracuse, New York, United States

Coordinates: 43.038438°N 76.136943°W

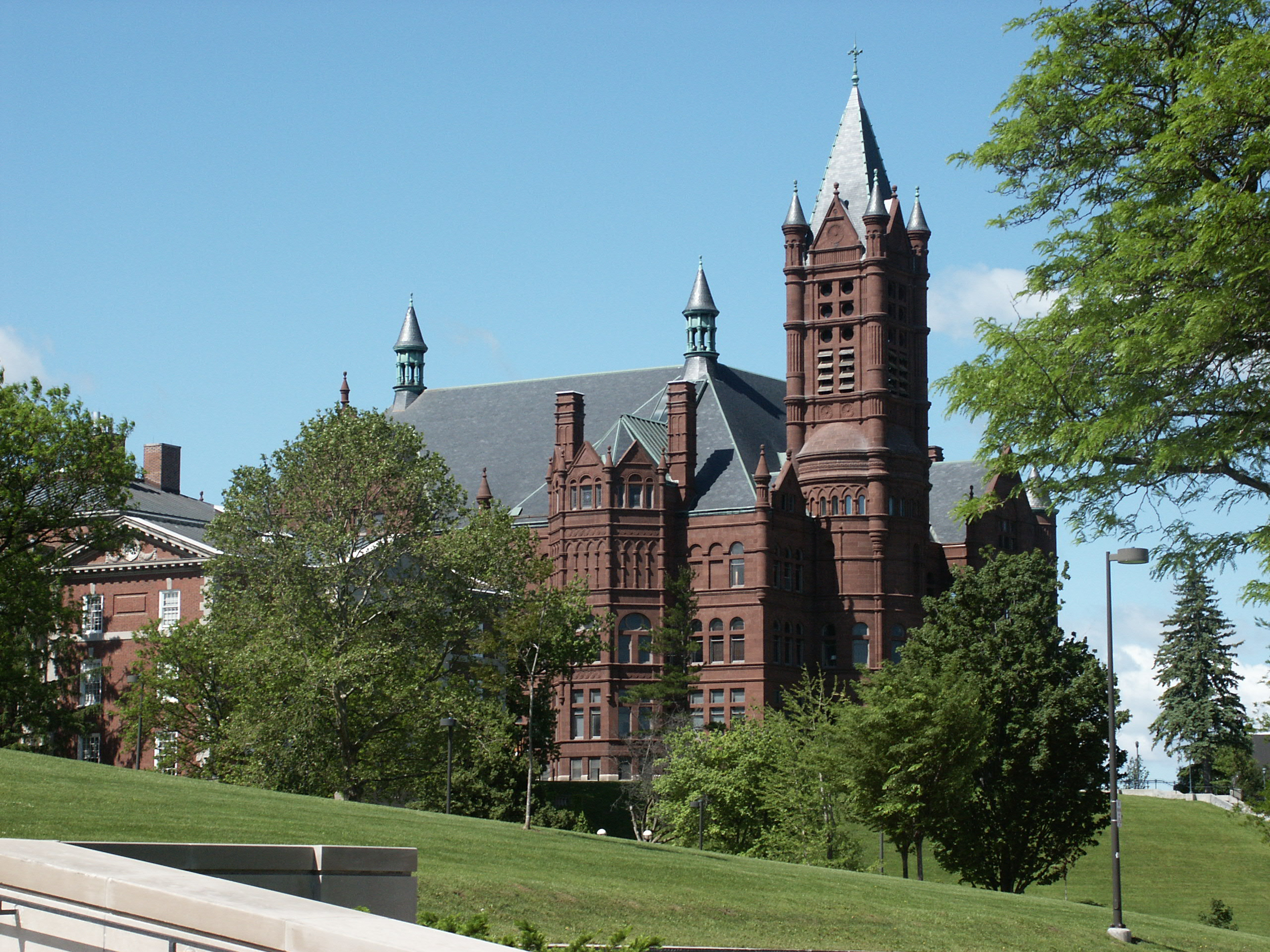
- North-east view of the Crouse College.
- Type: Private
- Established: 1887; 139 years ago
- Parent institution: Syracuse University College of Visual and Performing Arts
- Director: Milton Rubén Laufer
- Location: 200 Crouse College, Syracuse, New York, 13244, United States
- Campus: Urban
- Website: https://vpa.syr.edu/academics/music

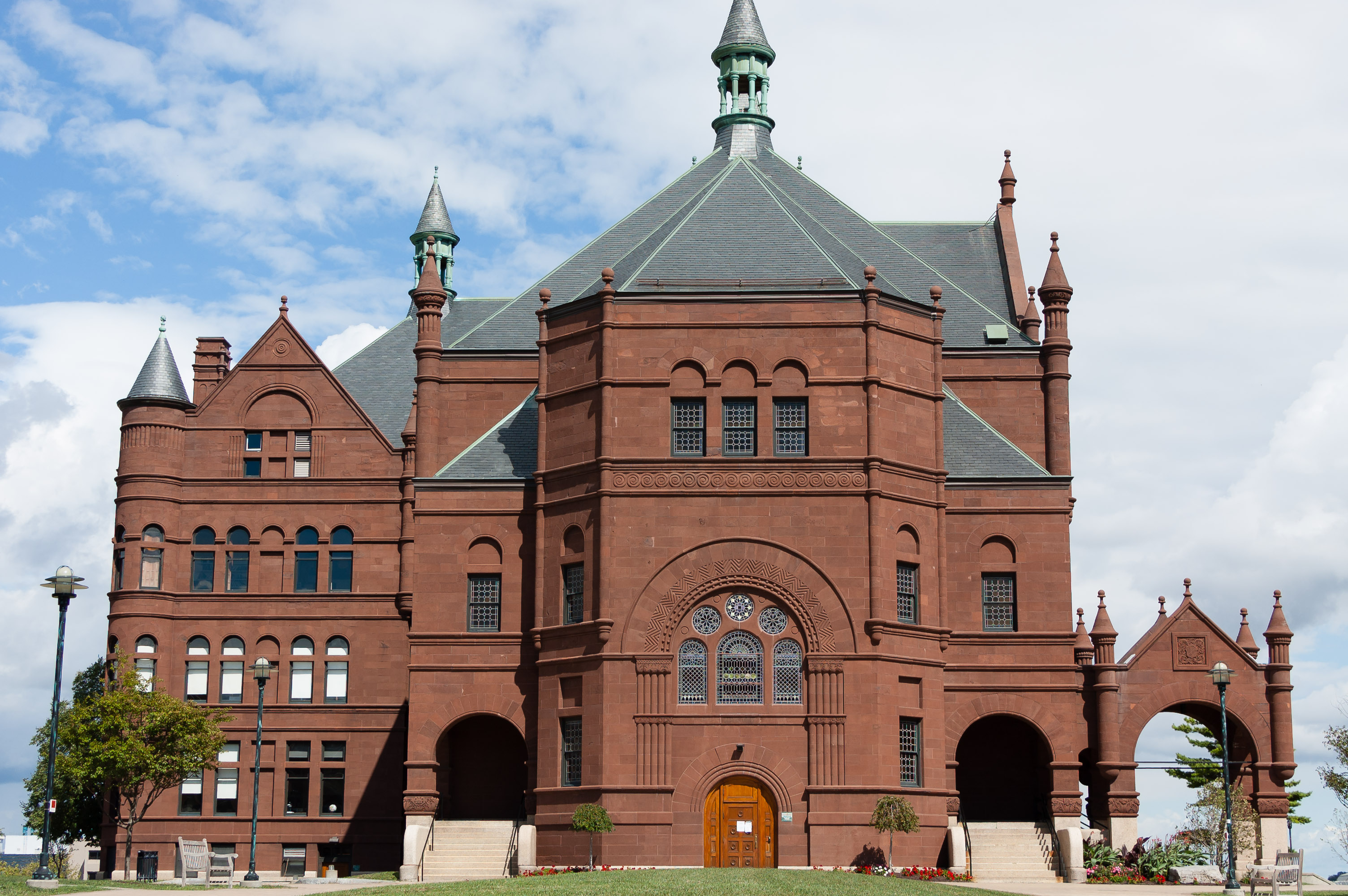
South face (backside) of Crouse College

Setnor School of Music, officially The Rose, Jules R., and Stanford S. Setnor School of Music, is one of seven academic units of the College of Visual and Performing Arts of Syracuse University. It is housed primarily in the historical Crouse College building.

== History ==
Syracuse University's first music professor was hired within the College of Fine Arts in 1877. The Music Department was founded in 1887, making Syracuse the first universities in the country to grant four-year degrees in music and require four years’ study in both music and theory. Syracuse University is a founding member of the National Association of Schools of Music (NASM) and houses the first accredited Music Industry program in the country (B.M. in Music Industry).

In 1945, the College of Fine Arts was reorganized to include the School of Music, School of Architecture, and the School of Art. The School of Music became part of the new College of Visual and Performing Arts in 1972.

The school was renamed The Rose, Jules R., and Stanford S. Setnor School of Music in 1997 after a $3.2 million dollar naming gift to the College of Visual and Performing Arts (VPA) from Jules R. Setnor ’32 and Rose Setnor ’33.

The Current Director of the Setnor School of Music is Dr. Milton Rubén Laufer (2019-present). He was preceded by Professor Martha Sutter (2015-2019) and Dr. Patrick Jones (2011-2015).

== Academics ==
The Setnor School of Music has approximately 230 students majoring in music, a number of students minoring in it, and 74 faculty members in the following four departments:

- Music Performance
- Music Composition
- Music Education
- Music Industry
- Sound Recording Technology

=== Degree programs ===
The Setnor school offers an undergraduate B.S. degree in Music and B.M. degrees in Music Education and Music Industry. In 2026, applications for several major undergraduate programs — Music Performance, Music Composition, and Sound Recording Technology — were eliminated as the university incentivized many senior, tenured faculty members into retirement.

Minors in Music Performance, Music Industry, Jazz and Commercial Music, and Private Music Study are offered.

The graduate degrees offered include M.M. in Conducting (Choral or Instrumental), Performance, and Music Education, and M.S. in Music Education. Applications for the M.A. program in Audio Arts and M.M. programs in Composition and Voice Pedagogy were eliminated in 2026.

The Setnor School previously hosted the Bandier Program in Recording and Entertainment Industries (named after Martin Bandier) until 2017, after which it was moved to the S. I. Newhouse School of Public Communications. It also offers other ad-hoc courses in collaboration with other institutes at SU, e.g. a recording course that teach high school students with disabilities.

=== Rankings and reputation ===
In 2016, Setnor School was ranked in 21st best music program in the United States. In 2005, Billy Joel established four Billy Joel Fellowships in Composition at the Setnor School.

== Ensembles ==
Setnor offers auditioned and non-auditioned choirs and instrumental ensembles to members of the Syracuse University community.

There are six choral ensembles (Concert Choir, Hendrick's Chapel Choir, Oratorio Society, University Singers, Women's Choir, and Windjammer Vocal Jazz Ensemble); Opera Workshop; five large, instrumental concert ensembles (Symphony Orchestra, Wind Ensemble, Symphony Band, Morton B. Schiff Jazz Ensemble, and Concert Band); the Samba Laranja Brazilian Ensemble and two athletic bands (The Pride of the Orange, Syracuse University Marching Band, and the Sour Sirtus Society, Basketball Pep Band).

In addition to these larger offerings, there are a number of smaller chamber ensembles including a Contemporary Music Ensemble, a Baroque Ensemble, a Percussion Ensemble, and both string and wind chamber ensembles.

== Concerts and recitals ==
The majority of the 175+ concerts given by the Setnor School of Music each year are held in the historic Setnor Auditorium and contain a wide range of musical genres and ensembles. The Rose and Jules R. Setnor Auditorium is a 700-seat concert hall in Crouse College that houses a 3,823-pipe Holtkamp Organ below a 70-foot-high open timber roof and stained glass windows. Recent and future guest artists to Setnor include composer Philip Rothman, the Kronos Quartet, and rock band Ra Ra Riot. Concerts and recitals held in the Setnor Auditorium are streamed live over the internet. Setnor also has modern networking in place to provide recording capabilities across the entire SU campus.

== See also ==
- List of concert halls
