= List of Syracuse University buildings =

Current buildings of Syracuse University

This list of Syracuse University buildings catalogs significant buildings and facilities, existing or demolished, owned by or closely associated with Syracuse University in Syracuse, New York. The university's archives document the university's buildings back to the start of its operations in rented space in 1871.

Two of the oldest surviving buildings, the Hall of Languages (1873) and Crouse College (1888-89), were listed on the National Register of Historic Places in the 1970s. Fifteen of the buildings on the original campus of the university, including those two, termed the Comstock Tract Buildings, were listed on the National Register as a historic district in 1980.

Locations of those having coordinates below may be seen together in a map by clicking on "Map all coordinates using OpenStreetMap" at the right side of this page.

Buildings are listed alphabetically.

KEY

^{∞}	Comstock Tract Buildings

Building	Image	Built	Location	Notes	Ref
200 Walnut Place (Counseling Center)		1901	200 Walnut Place	The building was first purchased by SU in 1943, then sold to Kappa Phi Delta and then repurchased after the frat chapter folded in 2002.	
426 Ostrom Ave (Psychology Research Building)		1875	426 Ostrom Ave	Houses Psychology Research Building of Syracuse University. Purchased by SU in July 1979.	
Alibrandi Catholic Center		1982	110 Walnut Place; 43.043134°N 76.133284°W	Named in 1982 in memory of John G. Alibrandi Jr.	
Archbold Gymnasium		1908	Forestry Drive; 43.035969°N 76.134705°W	Asserted to be the largest college gymnasium in the world when built. Home of the S.U. basketball team before Manley Field House (1962), except for three years while the gymnasium was rebuilt between 1949 and 1952 after a fire.	
Archbold Theatre		1980			
Barclay Law Library (College of Law)		1984			
Belfer Audio Archives		1982			
Biological Research Building		1963			
Bird Library		1972			
Booth Hall		1963		Named for Willis H. Booth, who earned an honorary doctorate in law in 1955 and was elected an honorary trustee of the university in 1956. It is a 8-floor coed dormitory building housing 261 students.	
Bowne Hall		1907	43.03663°N 76.13320°W		
Brewster/Boland/Brockway Complex		1968; 2005		Boland and Brewster Halls were built as dorms in 1968. Boland hall is named after John C. Boland (Class of 1899, Law 1901), and his wife, May L. Boland. Brewster Hall is named after Neal Brewster (Law 1902, SU Trustee) and his wife, Mabel Brewster Pierce. Brockway Hall, constructed in 2005, is named after Perle Brown Brockway (College of Medicine in 1908).	
Carnegie Library		1907		Carnegie library funded by $150,000 grant. Built of reinforced concrete, with Ionic order columns supporting a flat pediment. Its main reading room is striking with a high vaulted ceiling, Corinthian pilasters, and a second story gallery. Wainscoting and plaster columns throughout were painted to appear as stone.	
Carriage House		1914	161 Farm Acre Road, South Campus		
Center for International Services (Slutzker Center)		1894		The building was acquired from Sigma Phi Epsilon fraternity in 1970 after a $1.9 million endowment from Lillian and Emanuel Slutzker. It was formerly called Lillian and Emanuel Slutzker Center for International Services.	
Center for Science and Technology		1994			
Chancellor's Residence		1902		The brick building was built in 1901-02 by William Nottingham and designed by architect Albert L. Brockway. In 1915, after a monetary donation from John D. Archbold, Syracuse University obtained the property. The former residence of the Chancellor at 604 University Avenue, was ceded to the Nottingham family as part of this transaction.	
Commissary		1966			
Comstock Art Facility		1982			
Crouse College		1884			
Crouse-Hinds Hall		1983			
Ernie Davis Hall		2009		Named for Syracuse Orange football legend Ernie Davis who is first Black athlete to receive the Heisman Trophy. It is SU's first dorm building that meets the LEED rating and was considered a high-tech dorm building when first occupied.	
Day Hall and Graham Dining Hall		1958		Named for Chancellors James Roscoe Day (1894-1922), and William Pratt Graham (1937-1942), respectively. Located on Mount Olympus. Radio transmitters for the WAER & WJPZ FM are located on the roof of the Day Hall dormitory.	
Day Care Center (M-0 and M-1 Skytop)		1946		Childcare Center is a former World War II surplus pre-fabricated steel housing unit that was renovated in 1969 and 1986.	
DellPlain Hall		1961		Named after Morse O. DellPlain (SU trustee), who earned an electrical engineering degree from the university in 1903. While the construction was finished in 1959, male students started living there in 1961.	
Dineen Hall		2014		The Dineen Hall houses the Syracuse University College of Law on the West Campus expansion area of SU. Announced in November 2010, it is named for the Dineen family, who provided $15 million naming gift for the $90 million building. SU alumnus Richard Gluckman, of the Gluckman Mayner Architects in New York City, was the lead architect. The 200,000 square feet (19,000 m^{2}), five-story building, located at 950 Irving Avenue, was constructed on the site of the Raynor parking lot in 2013.	
Drumlins Country Club		1926			
Eggers Hall		1993			
Flanagan Gymnasium		1989			
Flint Hall		1956		Named for SU's fifth Chancellor Charles Wesley Flint.	
Gebbie Clinic		1972			
Goldstein Alumni and Faculty Center		1903		The Goldstein Alumni and Faculty Center is a 3-story red brick building which has a Colonial Georgian architecture. The building cost $25,000 to build in 1903 and served as a home to the Delta Kappa Epsilon fraternity, until 1974 when Syracuse University purchased the building from the fraternity and renovated it. The building served as a faculty center, a restaurant, as well as alumni center. Beginning in 2022, the building was repurposed as a visitors' center and hosts the office of admissions.	
Goldstein Student Center		1990			
Greenberg House (in Washington, D.C.)		1990			
Haft Hall		1955		Houses the WAER-fm at 795 Ostrom Ave. Built as a dorm, later used as a sorority house. WAER moved here in 2003.	
Hall of Languages		1873			
Haven Hall		1964		Named for SU's second Chancellor Erastus Otis Haven.	
Hawkins Building		1982			
Hendricks Chapel		1930	Shaw Quadrangle; 43.03763°N 76.13512°W		
Henry Health Center		1972			
Heroy Geology Laboratory		1972			
Hinds Hall		1955			
Holden Observatory		1887			
Hoople Special Education Building		1953		Demolished in January 2017.	
Hospital of the Good Shepherd		1972			
Huntington Hall		1915	43.041306°N 76.134826°W	Originally the site of the Hospital of the Good Shepherd, it was renamed Huntington Hall in 1964 to honor the Frederick Dan Huntington, Episcopal bishop and the founder of the hospital.	
Inn Complete (Ski Lodge)		1913	Skytop Road, South Campus	Building was renovated as Ski Lodge in 1947 and occupied in March 1948. Renovated as Inn Complete in 2002 for the Graduate Student Organization.	
JMA Wireless Dome (Carrier Dome)		1980	43.036238°N 76.136326°W	Named for donor Carrier Corporation as "Carrier Dome" for more than 40 years, renamed in 2022.	
La Casita Cultural Center		2011	Lincoln Building, 109 Otisco St 43.04610678°N 76.15917533°W	A Latinx/Latino community cultural center. It underwent extensive renovations with support from the university and the Round 2 Restore New York Communities Initiative—totalling $1 million (USD). Includes an art gallery, bilingual library, performance/workshop space, and a Cultural Memory Archive.	
Lawrinson Hall		1965		When built Lawrinson Hall was the second-tallest building in Syracuse at 21 stories. Currently the seventh tallest building in the city of Syracuse. Named after William Henry Lawrinson and Elizabeth M. Lawrinson, and their son Ronald K. Lawrinson (none of the Lawrinsons attended SU).	
Life Sciences Complex		2008		The five-story, 230,000–square feet, Life Sciences Complex hosts the biology, chemistry, and biochemistry departments. Designed by Ellenzweig Associates of Cambridge, MA, Life Sciences Complex cost $107 million and was the largest building project in the university's history up to that point. The extension was dedicated on November 7, 2008. The Milton atrium, named for Jack and Laura Milton (class of 1951), bridges the old Center for Science and Technology to the new Life Sciences Complex.	
Link Hall		1970			
Lubin House		1876		Built in 1876. Donated by Joseph Lubin in 1964.	
Lyman C. Smith Hall		1902			
Lyman Hall of Natural History		1907			
Lyons Hall		1971		Oren Lyons Hall was home to the Phi Sigma Sigma sorority until 1971. The university bought the building in 1974 and renamed it in 2007 after Oren Lyons, an Onondaga Nation faithkeeper and All-American lacrosse goalie for Syracuse Orange men's lacrosse team.	
M-17 Skytop		1959			
Machinery Hall		1907			
MacNaughton Hall (Law School)		1998			
Management Building, Whitman School of Management		2004	721 University Avenue; 43.04214°N 76.13405°W		
John A. Lally Athletics Complex (Manley Field House)		1962	1301 E. Colvin St; 43°1′30″N 76°7′39″W		
Marshall Square Mall		1981			
Maxwell Hall		1937			
Menschel Media Center		1999	316 Waverly Avenue	Robert B. Menschel Media Center is located in the former Watson Theater Complex.	
Minnowbrook Lodge (Minnowbrook Conference Center)		1900	Blue Mountain Lake	Acquired by SU in 1954.	
Moon Library (Forestry College)		1967			
More House (St. Thomas More Chapel)		1905	110 Walnut Place; 43.042855°N 76.133158°W	Original Catholic Chapel was built in 1905 on nearby private land and was made available to Syracuse students in 1939 by the Rev. Ryan Gannon. Alibrandi Catholic Center building addition was built in 1982.	
National Veterans Resource Center		2020	43.040611°N 76.136300°W	The National Veterans Resource Center at the Daniel & Gayle D’Aniello building houses the Institute for Veterans and Military Families. The building was designed by SHoP Architects in 2016, and the construction finished in spring 2020. The $64 million facility was funded entirely with philanthropic gifts. The four-story, 126,000-square-foot complex has space for a variety of veteran-related organizations and houses a 750-seat auditorium, a cafe, a gallery, a research center, and a banquet hall that turns into a lounge/study area. The facility serves Regional Student Veteran Resource Center, the U.S. Department of Veterans Affairs "Vet-Success on Campus", the National Center of Excellence for Veteran Business Ownership, Veteran Business Outreach Center and Accelerator, and Syracuse University's Office of Veteran and Military Affairs, and offices for the Army and Air Force ROTC.	
Newhouse Communications Center I		1964			
Newhouse Communications Center II		1974			
Newhouse Communications Center III		2007		The third addition to the Newhouse communications center, this building has the First Amendment to the United States Constitution etched into the windows. The building also includes a 350-seat auditorium, a dining facility and a media research center. The construction costs of the building was approximately $30 million with $17.5 million coming from the Samuel I. Newhouse foundation, which was one of the largest private donations in the school's history.	
Physical Plant		1949	285 Ainsley Drive		
Physics Building		1967	43.03705°N 76.13467°W		
Syracuse Stage/Regent Theatre Complex		1919		Acquired by SU in 1958.	
Sadler Hall		1960		Sadler is named after John W. Sadler (class of 1896) and his sister Nettie M. Sadler (class of 1900). They donated nearly half a million to SU.	
Schine Student Center		1985		The Hildegarde and J. Meyer Schine Student Center was dedicated on October 18, 1985. SU announced renovations to the Schine Student Center as part of the Campus Framework plan and began the work in spring 2019. The newly renovated student center officially reopened on February 8, 2021.	
Sensory Research		1988	621 Skytop Road		
Shaffer Art Building		1990	43.03674°N 76.13242°W		
Shaw Hall		1952		The dorm is named for Robert Shaw and his wife May M. Shaw, who donated $1.5 million towards the construction of the building. The building was designated as a Women's residence hall and served as a Living Learning Community after 1975. Shaw has had several renovations since the late 1980s, including the addition of new wings and a dining hall. Five residential floors of the building house around 475 students.	
Sheraton Syracuse University Hotel and Conference Center		1985			
Sims Hall		1907			
Skybarn		1977			
Skytop Administrative Offices		1973			
Skytop Housing Complex Phase I		1972			
Skytop Housing Complex Phase II		1974			
Slocum Hall		1919		Houses the School of Architecture. The five-story building — is listed on the National Register of Historic Places. Designed by Syracuse University School of Architecture professors Frederick W. Revels and Earl Hallenback and funded by philanthropist Mrs. Russell Sage as a memorial to her father. Construction began in April 1916 but, due to World War I and labor shortages, it was not completed until October 1918. When officially opened in 1919, the Architecture Department of the College of Fine Arts, founded in 1873, shared the building with the Joseph Slocum School of Agriculture and the School of Home Economics and the School of Business.	
Steam Station		1927			
Steele Hall		1898			
Syracuse Center of Excellence		2010			
Tennity Ice Skating Pavilion		2000	511 Skytop Road; 43°0′52″N 76°06′59″W		
William P. Tolley Administration Building		1889		Built as the Von Ranke Library, the building was converted to administrative use in 1907. It was designed by Archimedes Russell, it is a Romanesque style building of red brick, with circular towers.	
University College		1926	700 University Avenue	formerly a residence hall named for Grover Cleveland, who served on SU Board of Trustees 1883–1885.	
Walnut Hall		1989		Former chapter house of Lambda Chi Alpha fraternity. Purchased by Syracuse University in 1997	
Washington Arms		1953			
The Nancy Cantor Warehouse		2006		A former storage warehouse of the Syracuse-based Dunk and Bright Furniture Company in Downtown Syracuse was purchased by SU in 2005. It was renovated for classroom, gallery, and studio use at a cost of $9 million. The renovation was designed by Syracuse alumnus Richard Gluckman of New York City-based Gluckman Mayner Architects. In 2013, the Warehouse was named in honor of departing president Nancy Cantor.	
Watson Hall		1954		Named for Thomas J. Watson (of IBM, University trustee).	
White Hall		1954		Ernest I. White Hall was the home of the Syracuse University College of Law from 1954 to 2015. It later became home of the David B. Falk College of Sport and Human Dynamics. The building houses the Grant Auditorium, which was built in 1966.	
Winnick Hillel Center for Jewish Life		2003			
Women's Building		1954			

== See also ==
- SUNY College of Environmental Science and Forestry
- SUNY Upstate Medical University
- Syracuse University-Comstock Tract Buildings
- University Hill, Syracuse
