= Archbold Gymnasium =

Building on Syracuse University campus in New York, U.S.

- The Arch
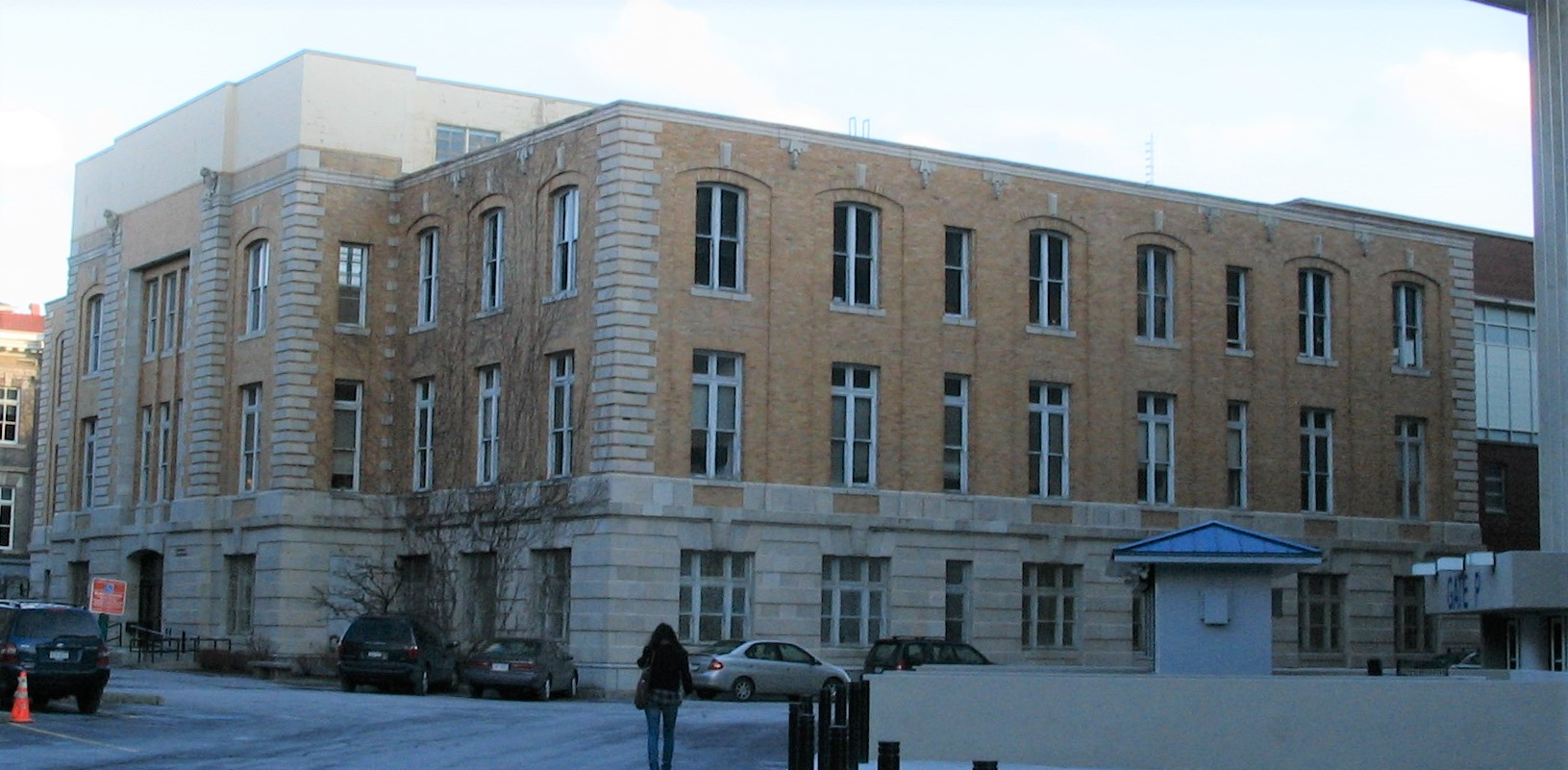
- Interactive map of Archbold Gymnasium
- Location: Forestry Drive, Syracuse, NY 13244
- Coordinates: 43.035969°N 76.134705°W
- Owner: Syracuse University
- Operator: Syracuse University

Construction
- Groundbreaking: March 24, 1908
- Opened: December 17, 1908
- Closed: 1947–1949
- Rebuilt: 1952, 2018-19
- Cost: $400,000 (1908) $3 million (1952) $50 million (2019)
- Architects: Professors Frederick W. Revels and Earl Hallenbeck

Tenant
- Syracuse Orange

Website
- ese.syr.edu/bewell

Archbold Gymnasium is a gymnasium located on the campus of Syracuse University in Syracuse, New York.

== History ==
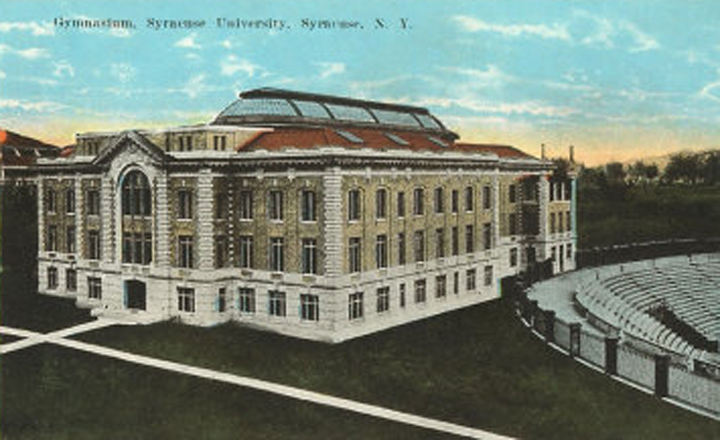
Postcard of the gymnasium c. 1916, next to the Archibald Stadium.

It was built in 1908 with $400,000 donated by John Dustin Archbold, a major benefactor of the university, who also funded the building of Archbold Stadium, just to the west of the gymnasium (now the site of the Carrier Dome). It was the largest college gymnasium when built. In 1909, the university was the first in the nation to install an indoor rowing tank, allowing the crew team to practice in the basement of Archbold Gymnasium during winter.

In September of 1928 it served as the site of the New York State Republican Convention.

It served as the home to the men's basketball team until the building of the Manley Field House in 1962, with the exception of the time from January, 1947 to 1949. This was due to a large fire which gutted most of the building. The building was rebuilt from 1948 to 1949, and a southern addition was made in 1952, as well as a neighboring gymnasium (Flanagan Gymnasium), which was built in 1989 and was only accessible via a glass skyway from Archbold Gymnasium.

== Current use ==
The gymnasium housed the club gymnastics team and served as the student health, wellness and recreation complex.

After major renovation in 2019, the facility became a combined student health, wellness and Recreation complex called the Barnes Center at The Arch. The building now houses the school's main recreation facility including climbing wall, esports room, basketball courts, a swimming pool, and fitness studios. The counseling center, health services, health promotions, pharmacy, and medical records offices are all housed in the new Barnes Center at The Arch. It is also home to the university’s men's and women's indoor rowing facilities.

== See also ==
- Bowne Hall
- Comstock Tract Buildings
- Steele Hall
