= Syracuse University School of Architecture =

Architecture school at Syracuse University

Syracuse Architecture
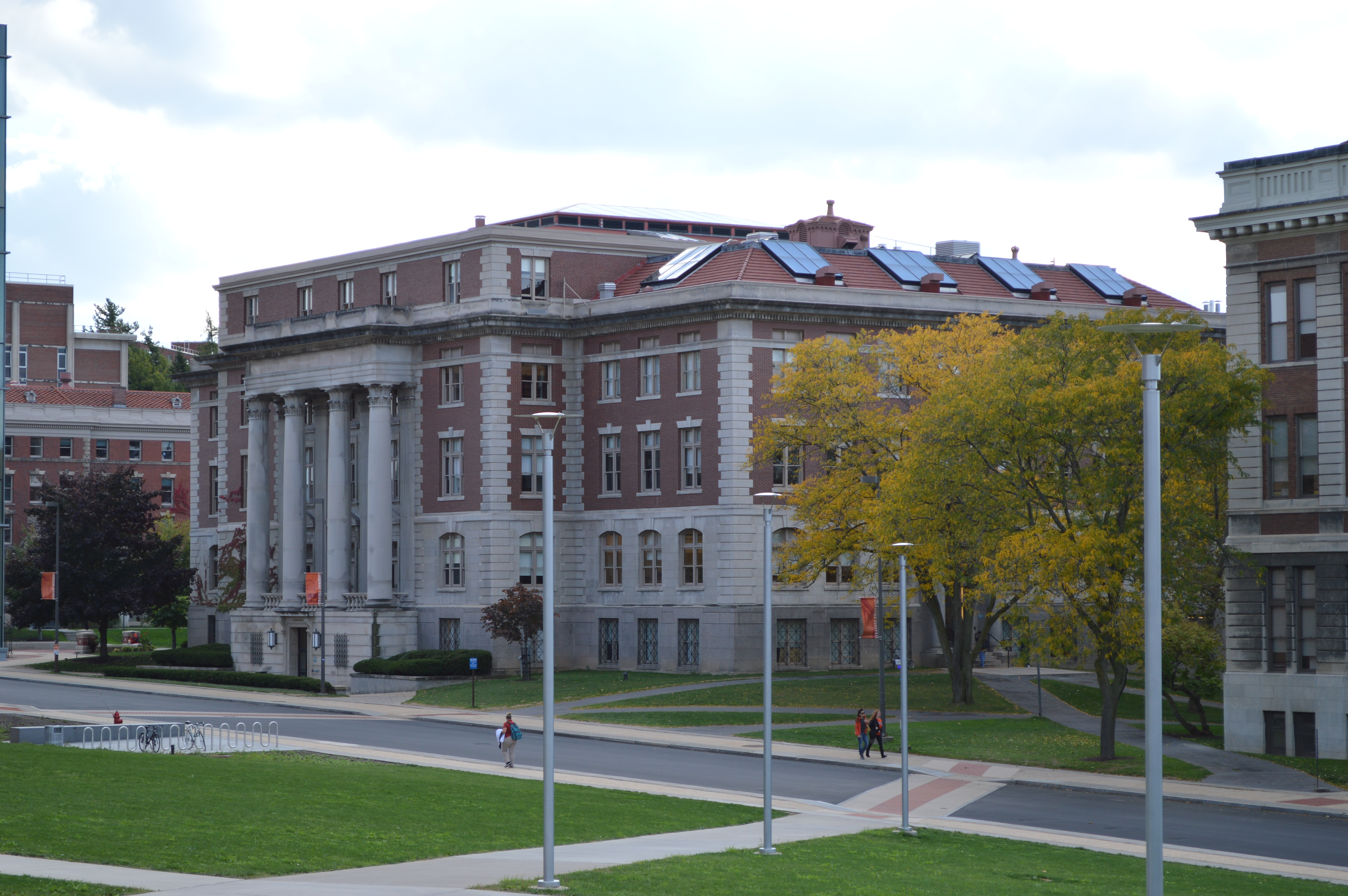
- Slocum Hall
- Type: Private architecture school
- Established: 1873; 153 years ago
- Parent institution: Syracuse University
- Dean: Michael Speaks
- Associate Dean: Kyle Miller
- Undergraduates: 840
- Postgraduates: 60
- Location: 201 Slocum Hall, Syracuse, New York, New York, United States; 43.0377°N 76.1317°W
- Campus: Urban
- Website: soa.syr.edu

The Syracuse University School of Architecture, commonly known as Syracuse Architecture, is the architecture school of Syracuse University, a private research university in Syracuse, New York. It offers bachelor's and master's degrees and is accredited by the National Architectural Accrediting Board (NAAB). Founded in 1873, it has the fourth oldest architecture program in the United States.

== History ==
The architecture school was one of the early schools on Syracuse campus, starting in 1873, just three years after Syracuse University was founded. The school was created as one of two new departments within the College of Fine Arts by George Fisk Comfort who served as the Dean of the new college. He later founded Metropolitan Museum of Art in New York City. Prominent local architects, including Horatio Nelson White, Archimedes Russell, and Ward Wellington Ward were recruited as professors. The original College of Fine Arts was the first institution in the United States to offer both B.A. and M.A. degrees in architecture, painting, sculpture, music, and other. The college was dissolved in 1945, with many new schools forming in its place.

The first female student enrolled at Syracuse architecture in 1877, in process becoming the first female in the United States to study architecture as a profession. Frances Whipple Bigelow became the first female graduate in 1898.

== Facilities ==
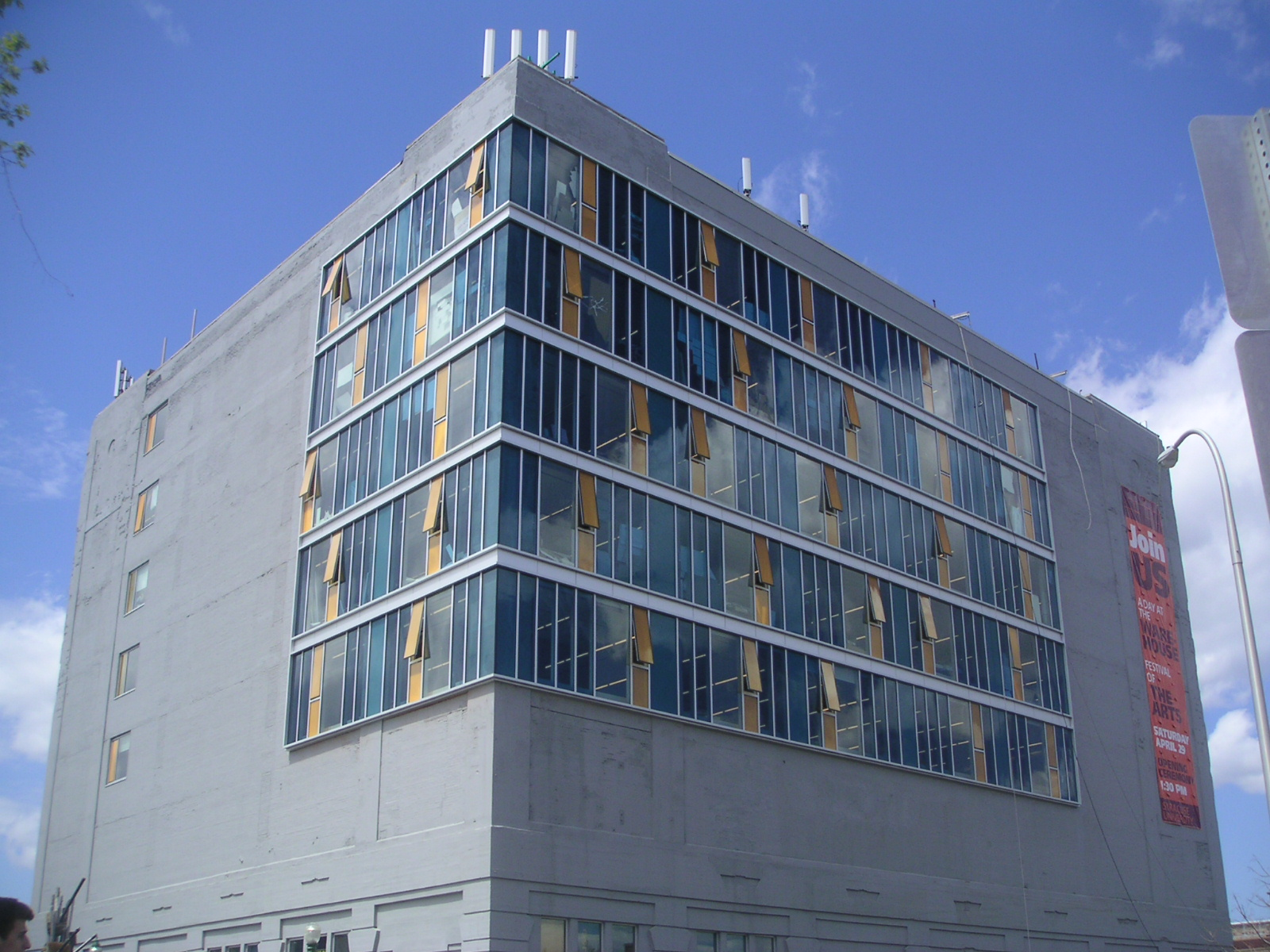
The Nancy Cantor Warehouse in 2006.

The program was first housed in the Hall of Languages, and was moved to the newly built Crouse College in 1883, then to Steele Hall in 1908. It finally found its permanent home in newly designed, skylit Slocum Hall in 1919. The school has long been housed in Slocum Hall on the university's main campus, but in January, 2006 the School of Architecture moved to a temporary home in a converted warehouse in downtown Syracuse so that Slocum Hall could undergo massive renovations. As of fall of 2008, the school has returned to its home in Slocum Hall.

== Academics ==
The undergraduate program includes nearly 840 students, representing 46 countries, and leads to a Bachelor of Architecture (B.Arch.) degree. The graduate program includes 60 students, and offers Master of Architecture (M.Arch.) and post-professional Master of Science (M.S.) in Architecture programs.

== Rankings ==
The Bachelor of Architecture program was ranked 5th nationally in both the most Hired from and most admired categories by the journal Design Intelligence in its 2019–20 rankings. The graduate program was ranked 16th in the nation by DesignIntelligence on their 2019 list of top architecture schools.
