= Downtown Syracuse =

Economic center of Syracuse, New York, US

Coordinates: 43.047822°N 76.150811°W

- Neighborhood
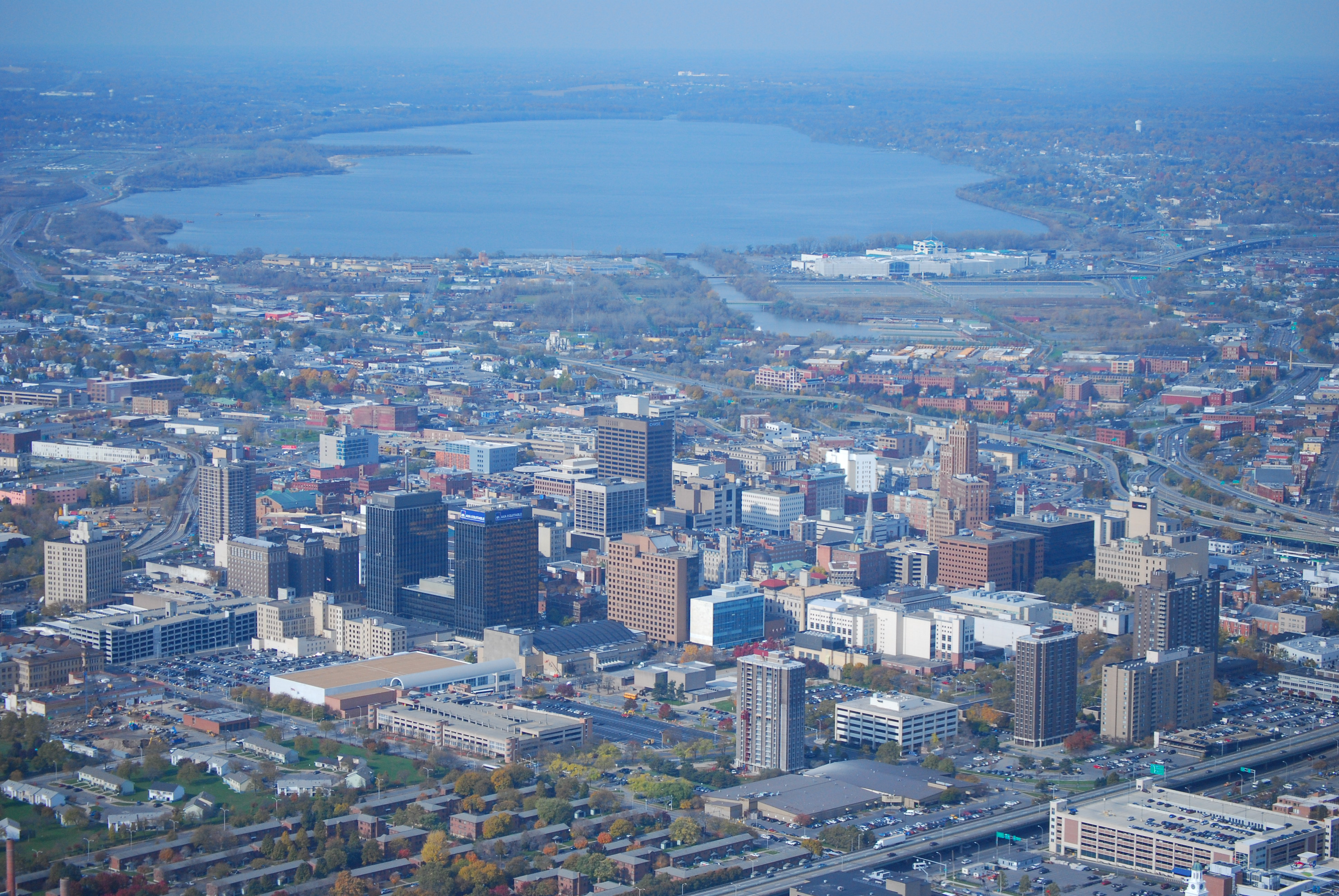
- Downtown Syracuse, 2011
- Interactive map of Downtown Syracuse

Population (2020)
  - Total: 4,300
- ZIP code: 13202

Downtown Syracuse is the economic center of Syracuse, New York, and Central New York, employing more than 30,000 people, and housing more than 4,300. It is also one of the 26 officially recognized neighborhoods of Syracuse.

== History ==
Downtown Syracuse during its golden years. This photo is of South Salina Street around 1915.

Downtown Syracuse, as the rest of the city, grew as a result of the city's salt industry and its location on the Erie Canal.

For more than a century, it was also the retail and entertainment center of Central New York, with large department stores such as Chappell's, The Addis Co., Flah's, E.W. Edwards, Woolworth's, Grant's, Lincoln Stores, The Mohican, David's, Kresge's, Clark Music Co., Dey Brothers, and Sibley's. This attribute began to fade with development of large suburban malls, with the final blow in 1992 when the combined Addis & Dey's department store became the last major store to leave downtown.

=== South Salina Street ===
South Salina Street between Erie Boulevard and West Onondaga Street was the main north-south artery of Downtown Syracuse and was among the busiest streets in the city. The area has seen a great deal of revitalization in recent years with projects such as the conversion of the historic Syracuse Trust Building into luxury condos, a project engineered by local developer Peter Muserlian. More development projects are planned.

=== Cobblestone streets ===
In 1835, the "nature of the soil and the flat surface of the ground" in the village rendered the construction of stone pavements necessary. An ordinance was passed authorizing the paving with cobblestone of Salina Street from Fayette to Church Streets and Genesee Street from the west line of Clinton Square to Hanover Square. Additionally, sections of Water, Warren and Franklin Streets were paved.

The paving of these streets also made it necessary to pave the public squares, or the work would be "incomplete." A sum of $4,500 was raised with general tax. During the same year, sidewalks of brick were ordered to be constructed along all paved streets and squares where they had not already been laid including Salina Street from Washington Street to Onondaga Avenue.

=== Armory Square ===
Armory Square is a small neighborhood on the west side of Downtown Syracuse. It began life as a busy commercial and industrial area just to the west of the central city. Named after the historic armory building that still inhabits the district's center, Armory Square is now home to luxury condos, restaurants, cafes, and high-end office space.

=== Forman Park ===
Forman Park was first established on June 16, 1839, and was known as Forman Square. The main attraction is a bronze memorial of early civic leaders Joshua Forman and Lewis H. Redfield. The park is 1.3 acres and is located at East Genesee and Almond Streets.

=== Clinton Square ===
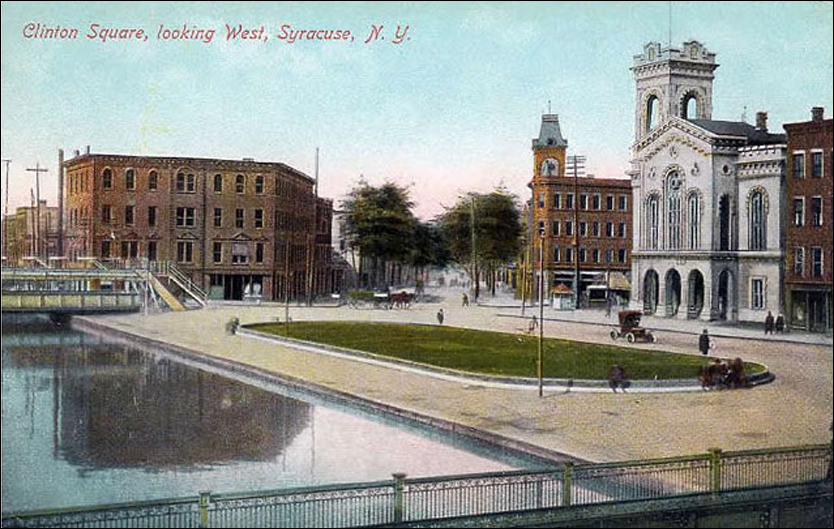
Clinton Square looking west in Syracuse, New York in 1909 with Erie Canal in forefront - Bastable Block in rear and old County Courthouse to right

Clinton Square first came into existence in the early 19th century when roadways from north and south joined in downtown Syracuse. By the mid-19th century, the construction of Erie Canal further transformed the busy intersection into the center of commerce and trade in Central New York.

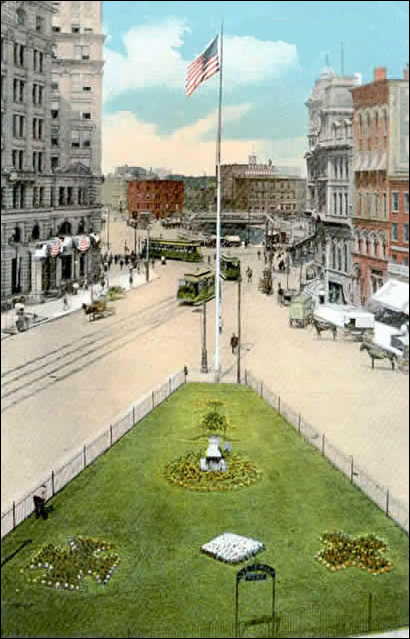
Veteran's Park in Syracuse, New York about 1900 - Later renamed Hanover Square

=== Hanover Square ===
Hanover Square is actually a triangle at the intersection of Warren, Water, and East Genesee Streets. The name may also refer to the larger Hanover Square Historic District, which includes seventeen historic buildings in the area that was the first commercial district in Syracuse.

The public square was originally named Veteran's Park. It was renamed to Hanover Square after the Soldiers' and Sailors' Monument in Clinton Square was dedicated in 1910 and the function of commemorating Syracuse's war dead was shifted there. The larger Clinton Square had already developed as the city's center to the west, but following the completion of the Erie Canal in 1825, commercial and retail activity spread along Genesee Street to Hanover Square.

=== Landmark Theatre ===
Downtown Syracuse also boasts the Landmark Theatre originally known as Loew's State Theatre, where visitors and locals can view Broadway shows, performances by comedians, and musical performers. The theatre began construction in 1927 on March 15 and was completed after 11 months of construction. The first opening show aired on February 18, 1928.

In 1933, Loew's made its first public demonstration of the television and in 1934, the theatre then began introducing double feature in 1934.

After World War II, the theatre's patronage decreased drastically. The theatre fell into disrepair and in 1975 was officially closed. In the following year of 1976, the US department listed the theatre in the National Register of Historic Places.

In 1979, the title for the theatre was given to SALT (Syracuse Area Landmark Theatre) and a major volunteer effort began to restore the theatre. These efforts were supported by The National Endowment of the Arts and the State Office of Parks and Recreation, which provided grants to help the restoration continue.

The theatre now boasts having prominent performers, such as Jerry Seinfeld and Celtic Women, bringing their acts to Syracuse and often features many popular Broadway shows.

=== Community profile ===
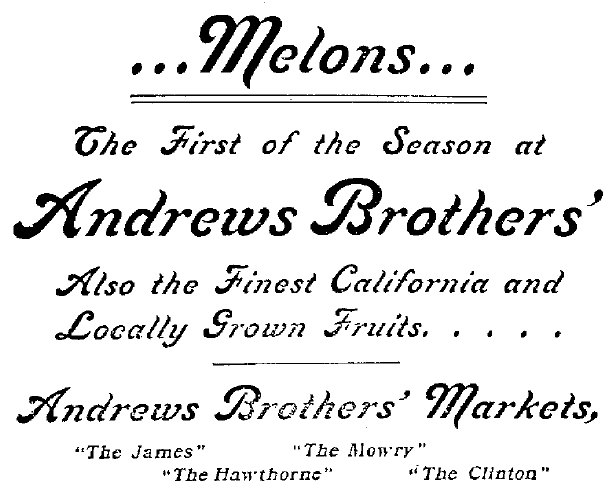
Advertisement for Andrew Brothers Markets in Syracuse, New York in June 1902

Today, downtown Syracuse is an economic center, with many insurance companies, banks, and law firms having a large presence there.

Since the late 1980s, downtown Syracuse has also increasingly become a nightlife center, with many bars, clubs, restaurants, and pubs located in the Armory Square area.

Most of Syracuse's cultural festivals, such as Oktoberfest and Festa Italiana, also take place downtown.

The Downtown Committee of Syracuse has made a great deal of effort to revitalize the area. Most sidewalks and streetlights have been restored since 1995, with maps and other information posted on many street corners.

All of downtown is lively on weekdays, but on nights and weekends most activity centers around the Armory Square, Hanover Square, and Clinton Square areas. With the reopening of the historic Marriott Syracuse Downtown in 2016, there are currently three hotels downtown.

=== National Register of Historic Places ===
The following are listed on the National Register of Historic Places and located in Downtown Syracuse: Amos Block, Armory Square Historic District, Central New York Telephone and Telegraph Building, Central Technical High School, Gere Bank Building, Gridley Building, Hanover Square Historic District, Hotel Syracuse, Loew's State Theater, Montgomery Street-Columbus Circle Historic District, New York Central Railroad Passenger and Freight Station, Niagara Hudson Building, Onondaga County War Memorial, Plymouth Congregational Church, St. Paul's Cathedral and Parish House, C.W. Snow and Company Warehouse, South Salina Street Downtown Historic District, Syracuse City Hall, Syracuse Savings Bank, Third National Bank, Weighlock Building, White Memorial Building, and Hamilton White House.

== Recent years ==
In December 2005, Syracuse University announced it had purchased eleven buildings downtown, and leased another. Hundreds of faculty, staff, and students began using the buildings in the spring of 2006. Former Syracuse University chancellor Nancy Cantor's motto for the venture was "Exploring the Soul of Syracuse." At the same time, the university and the city were working on a project called the "Connective Corridor", a special path from the university area to Armory Square. The main building of Syracuse University downtown is The Warehouse.

== See also ==
- List of tallest buildings in Syracuse, New York
