= Henry Sedgwick =

Henry Sedgwick may refer to:

- Henry Dwight Sedgwick (1861–1957), American lawyer and author
- Henry J. Sedgwick (1812–1868), American lawyer and politician from New York
