= Syracuse University College of Arts and Sciences =

College of Arts and Sciences at Syracuse University

Coordinates: 43°2′19″N 76°8′4″W

College of Arts and Sciences
- Former name: College of Liberal Arts (1871–1970)
- Type: Private
- Established: 1871; 155 years ago
- Parent institution: Syracuse University
- Dean: Behzad Mortazavi
- Location: Syracuse, New York, United States
- Campus: Urban
- Website: artsandsciences.syracuse.edu

The Syracuse University College of Arts and Sciences (A&S) is the founding liberal arts college of Syracuse University in Syracuse, New York. Established in 1871, it is the oldest and largest college at Syracuse University by enrollment. It offers programs in the natural sciences, mathematics, and the humanities, as well as the social sciences in collaboration with the Maxwell School of Citizenship and Public Affairs.

== History ==
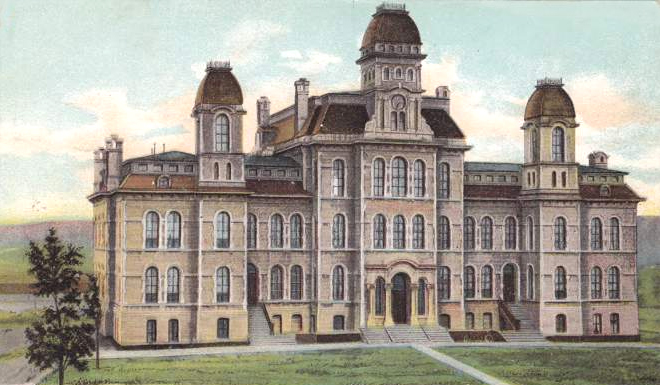
Hall of Languages, built in 1871–73, was the first building constructed on the Syracuse University campus

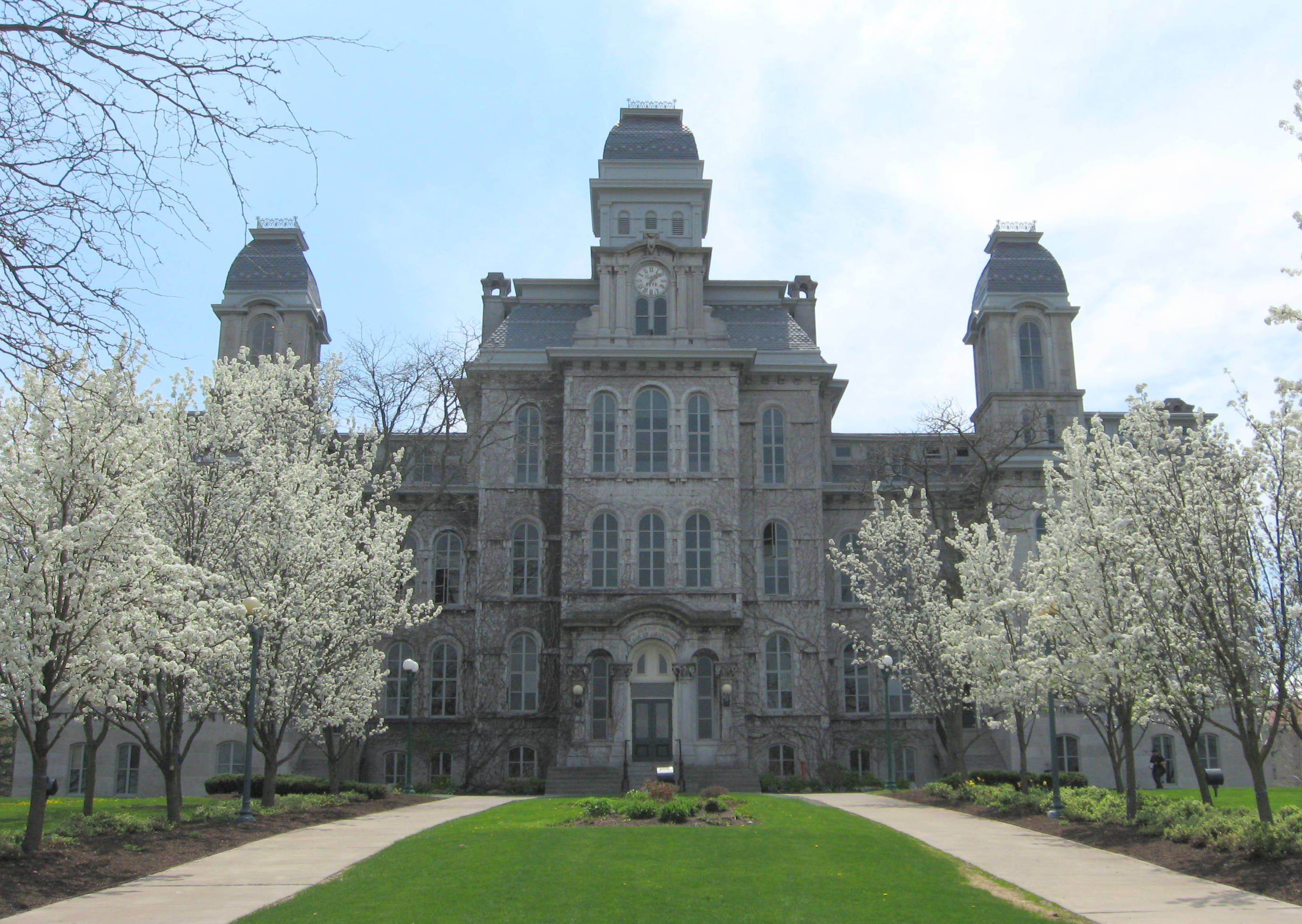
The exterior of the Hall of Languages in 2014.

The College of Arts and Sciences was founded in 1871 as the College of Liberal Arts and offered courses in algebra, geometry, Latin, Greek, history, physiology, education, and rhetoric. John Raymond French, a professor of mathematics, served as the first dean of the college.

Prior to the completion of Hall of Languages in 1873, classes were held in a rental property in downtown Syracuse. The college's curriculum steadily expanded over the years, such as the establishment of biology and geology department in 1891, the predecessor of today's department of biology and department of earth and environmental sciences. Construction of the Physics Building, which was partially funded by a $1.58 million National Science Foundation grant, was completed in 1967 to house the growing physics department.

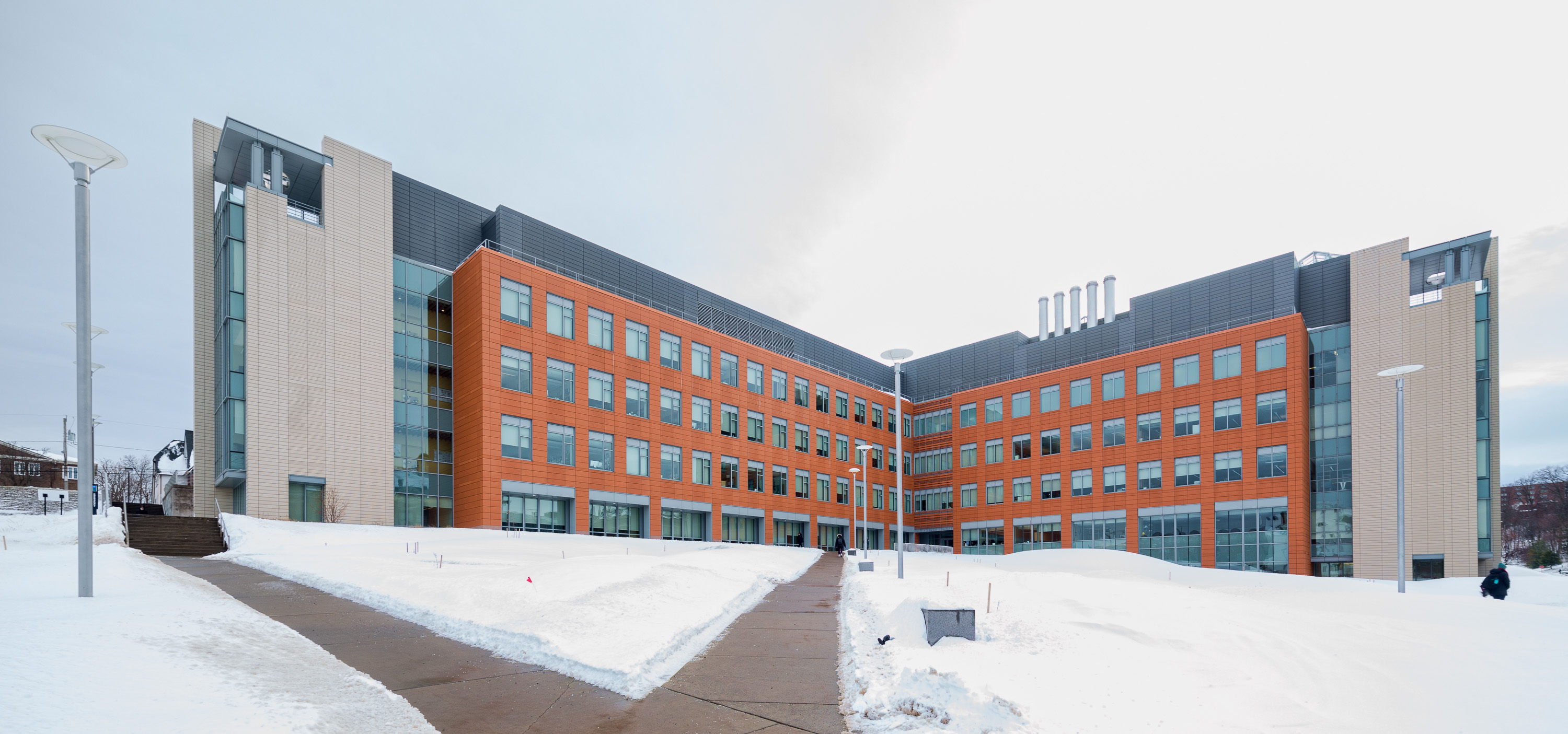
Life Sciences Complex at Syracuse University

The College of Liberal Arts was renamed the College of Arts and Sciences in 1970 to reflect the breadth of its curriculum.

In 2008, the University’s largest academic construction project — the $107 million, 200,000-square-foot Life Sciences Complex — was completed and, for the first time, combined the departments of biology and chemistry under the same roof.

Following the tenure of George M. Langford, Karin Ruhlandt, chair of the department of chemistry, was named dean of the College of Arts and Sciences in January 2015. Having served more than 7 years as dean, she stepped down in June 2022. Lois Agnew, associate dean of curriculum, innovation and pedagogy, was named interim dean while a national search for Ruhlandt’s permanent replacement commenced.

Behzad Mortazavi, former chair and professor of biological sciences at the University of Alabama, was named the new dean of the College of Arts & Sciences in March 2023. His appointment began on July 1, 2023.

== Academics ==
The College of Arts and Sciences is a liberal arts college. It offers over 50 bachelor's, master's, and doctoral degree programs in the natural sciences, mathematics, the humanities, and the social sciences in collaboration with the Maxwell School of Citizenship and Public Affairs. It is home to research centers and institutes such as the Syracuse University Humanities Center, the BioInspired Institute, and the Forensic and National Security Sciences Institute (FNSSI).

=== Academic departments ===
The college is organized into the following major academic departments in the natural sciences, mathematics, and the humanities. Departments in the social sciences are housed within the Maxwell School of Citizenship and Public Affairs.

- African American Studies
- Art and Music Histories
- Biology
- Biotechnology
- Chemistry
- Communication Sciences and Disorders
- Earth and Environmental Sciences
- English
- Forensic and National Security Sciences Institute
- Languages, Literatures, and Linguistics
- Mathematics
- Neuroscience
- Philosophy
- Physics
- Psychology
- Religion
- Science Teaching
- Women's and Gender Studies
- Writing Studies, Rhetoric, and Composition

In mid-September 2025, the College of Arts and Sciences Dean Behzad Mortazavi announced that 20 majors across arts, humanities, math, and natural sciences departments would be paused or eliminated without consulting faculty. Among the 18 paused majors are African American Studies, Fine Arts, Latino-Latin American Studies, Middle Eastern Studies, and Modern Jewish Studies. The two majors facing complete elimination are B.S. in Earth Sciences and both B.A. and B.S. in Ethics. In August 2025, Vice Chancellor and Provost Lois Agnew directed deans to initiate "an academic portfolio review within their school." The university's academic review follows months of Trump administration threats to withdraw federal funding from institutions providing courses and programs related to diversity, equity, and inclusion. Although Provost Agnew considers the portfolio review essential "in the midst of a rapidly changing landscape in higher education," faculty members have raised concerns about academic decisions proceeding without their consultation or oversight. The portfolio review is ongoing as of September 2025.
