= Daniel Gott =

American politician (1794–1864)

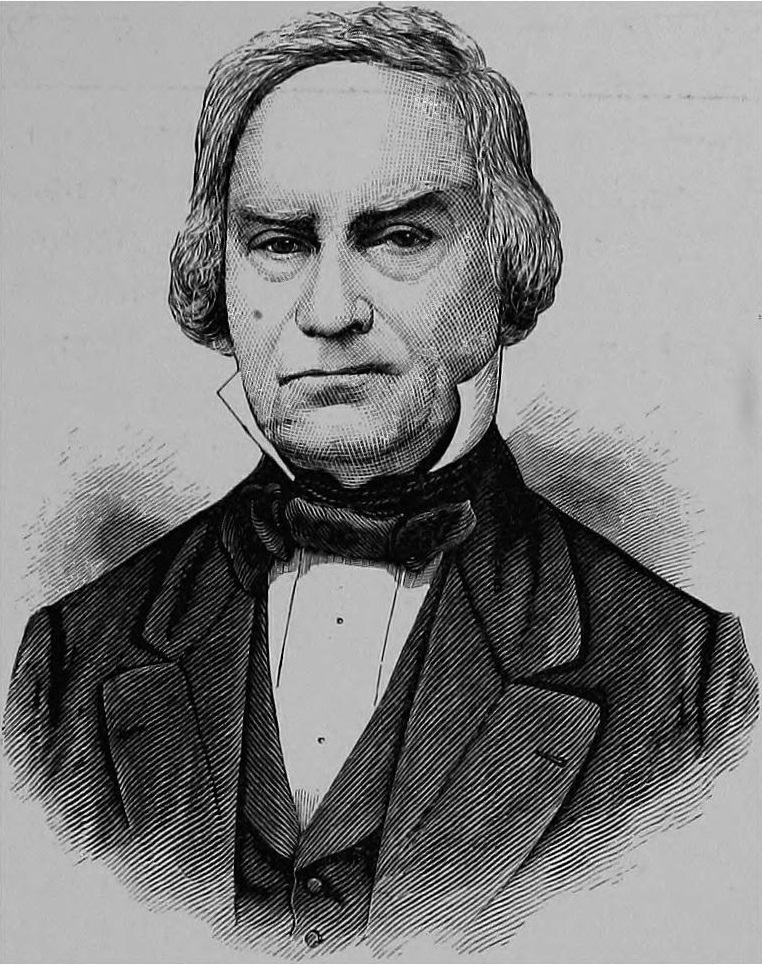
- From 1878's History of Onondaga County, New York

Member of the U.S. House of Representatives from New York's 24th district
- In office March 4, 1847 – March 3, 1851
- Preceded by: Horace Wheaton
- Succeeded by: Daniel T. Jones

Personal details
- Born: July 10, 1794 Hebron, Connecticut, U.S.
- Died: July 6, 1864 (aged 69) Syracuse, New York, U.S.
- Resting place: Pompey Hill Cemetery, Pompey, New York
- Party: Whig (1834–1855)
- Other political affiliations: Anti-Masonic Party (before 1834); Republican (from 1855)
- Spouse: Anna (Baldwin) Sedgwick (m. 1819)
- Relations: Charles B. Sedgwick (stepson); Henry J. Sedgwick (stepson)
- Children: 5

Military service
- Allegiance: United States; New York
- Service: New York Militia
- Years of service: 1812–1816
- Rank: Ensign
- Unit: 98th Infantry Regiment
- Wars: War of 1812

Daniel Gott (July 10, 1794 – July 6, 1864) was an American lawyer and politician who served as a U.S. representative for New York's 24th congressional district from 1847 to 1851.

== Early life and education ==
Daniel Gott was born in Hebron, Connecticut, on July 10, 1794, to Hazael and Abigail Gott (née Phelps). (Note: Most sources give the birth year as 1794; a few indicate that Gott was born in 1793.) He attended the schools of Hebron, then taught school and began to learn the clothier's trade from his uncle Ebenezer Snow.

After beginning the study of law with attorney Sylvester Gilbert in Hebron, in 1817 Gott moved to Pompey, New York, where he taught school and continued the study of law with attorneys Victory Birdseye and Daniel Wood, the father of Daniel P. Wood. During the War of 1812, Gott served in the New York Militia. Commissioned an ensign in the 98th Regiment, a unit of the 18th Division's 27th Brigade, Gott was subsequently appointed the regimental adjutant. The 98th Regiment was activated for duty in defense of Sackets Harbor, New York during October 1814. Gott remained in the militia until 1816.

== Law career ==
Gott was admitted to the bar in 1819 and commenced practice in Pompey, New York as the partner of Samuel Baldwin. Among the aspiring attorneys who studied with him were L. Harris Hiscock, George Henry Williams, Charles Mason, and Charles Foster. Gott served for many years as a trustee of Pompey Academy. In 1828, he was afflicted with a condition that affected his vision and sometimes required him to remain confined to a dark room. Despite this condition, he was able to continue practicing law, and he recovered his vision completely in 1840.

== Politics ==
In the early 1830s Gott became active in politics as a member of the Anti-Masonic Party. He later became identified with the Whig Party, and in 1844 was chosen as an elector for Whig presidential nominee Henry Clay, but Democratic nominee James K. Polk carried New York in the November election.

=== U.S. Representative ===
In 1846, Gott was elected to the United States House of Representatives. He was re-elected in 1848 and served in the 30th and 31st Congresses, March 4, 1847, to March 3, 1851. He was an unsuccessful candidate for re-election in 1852. During his House service, Gott was a member of the Committee on Territories.

As an advocate of ending slavery, in December 1848 Gott introduced a resolution condemning slavery in the District of Columbia and ordering the committee with jurisdiction to prepare legislation to end it. With many proponents of slavery out of the chamber when the vote took place, the resolution passed 98 to 88. Infuriated pro-slavery members were able to reverse Gott's resolution in January 1849. Abraham Lincoln, another Whig representative opposed to slavery, proposed a compromise that would include compensation for owners whose slaves were freed. While he was encouraged by the private feedback he received, including support from Gott, this proposal failed to attract many public backers, so Lincoln never formally introduced it.

Gott appointed Henry Warner Slocum to the United States Military Academy in 1848. Slocum served as a major general in the Union Army during the American Civil War, and later served as a member of the U.S. House. In 1849 and 1851, Gott was elected as his Assembly district's delegate to the Whig Party state convention.

=== Later career ===
In 1851, Gott was the unsuccessful Whig nominee for a seat on the New York Supreme Court. He moved to Syracuse, New York, in 1853 where practiced law in partnership with his son Daniel F. Gott. When the Republican Party was founded as the main anti-slavery party in the mid-1850s, Gott became an early adherent.

Gott was a lifelong member of the Presbyterian Church. In 1852, he was a founder of the Pompey Bible Society, and he was chosen to serve as its first president.

== Personal life ==
Gott died in Syracuse, on July 6, 1864, aged 69, and was interred at Pompey Hill Cemetery in Pompey, New York.

In 1819, Gott married Anna Baldwin, the sister of his law partner Samuel Baldwin, who was widowed after the death of attorney Stephen Sedgwick. (Note: Some sources indicate that Anna Baldwin and Stephen Sedgwick divorced before she married Gott.) Their children included Daniel Francis, Amelia, Anne, Charles, and Samuel Sackett. Congressman Charles B. Sedgwick (1815–1883) and State Senator Henry J. Sedgwick (1812–1868), both of whom studied law under Gott, were his stepsons.
