= Oswego City Hall =

- U.S. National Register of Historic Places
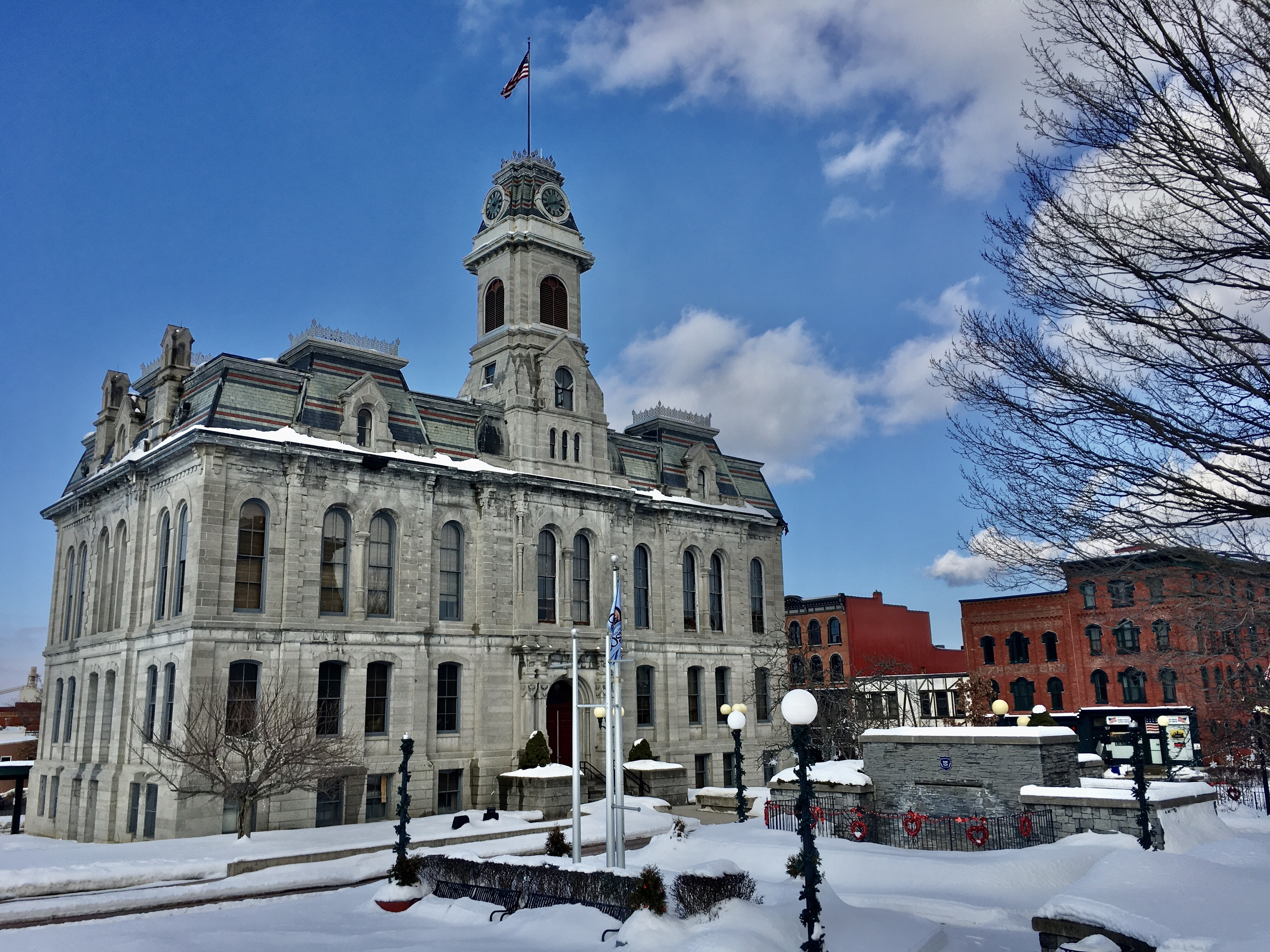
- City hall in 2021

- Location within New York Location within the United States
- Location: W. Oneida St., Oswego, New York
- Coordinates: 43°27′19″N 76°30′42″W
- Area: 0.5 acres (0.20 ha)
- Built: 1870
- Architect: White, Horatio Nelson
- NRHP reference No.: 73001248
- Added to NRHP: February 20, 1973

Oswego City Hall is a historic city hall located at Oswego in Oswego County, New York. It was built in 1870 and is a 2 1/2-story masonry, mansarded structure with a distinctive central clock tower. It was designed by architect Horatio Nelson White (1814–1892).

It was listed on the National Register of Historic Places in 1973.
