= Daniel T. Jones (politician) =

American politician

Daniel Terryll Jones
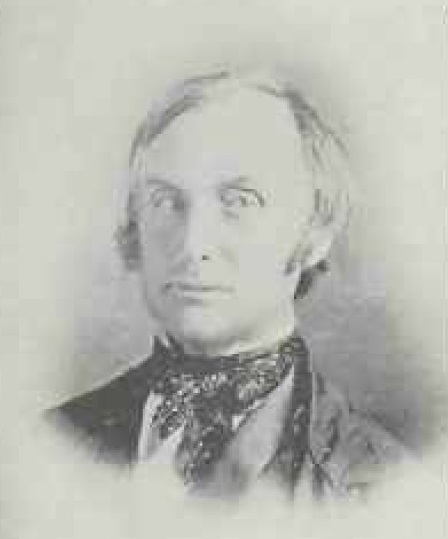

Member of the U.S. House of Representatives from New York's 24th district
- In office March 4, 1851 – March 3, 1855
- Preceded by: Daniel Gott
- Succeeded by: Amos P. Granger

Personal details
- Born: Daniel Terryll Jones; August 17, 1800 Hebron, Connecticut
- Died: March 29, 1861 (aged 60) Baldwinsville, New York
- Citizenship: United States
- Party: Democratic Party
- Spouse: Eliza Lawrence Jones
- Education: Yale College
- Profession: physician; postmaster; politician

Daniel Terryll Jones (August 17, 1800 – March 29, 1861) was a medical doctor, an American politician and a U.S. Representative from New York, serving two terms in the House from 1851 to 1855.

== Biography ==
Born in Hebron, Connecticut, Jones was the son of Daniel and Lydia White Jones. He received a liberal schooling, and graduated from the medical department of Yale College in 1826. He began the practice of his profession in Amboy, New York.

== Career ==
Jones moved to Baldwinsville, New York, in 1841, where he continued to practice medicine and also served as Postmaster. A well-respected doctor, several prospective physicians studied with him before beginning their own practices. He married Eliza Lawrence in Washington D. C.

=== Tenure in Congress ===
Elected as a Democrat, representing New York's twenty-fourth district, to the Thirty-second and Thirty-third Congresses, Jones served from March 4, 1851, to March 3, 1855. He was not a candidate for renomination in 1854.

=== Later career and death ===
After leaving office, he resumed the practice of medicine in Baldwinsville. He became a Republican after the party was founded, and in 1858 he was Chairman of the Republican Convention at Syracuse, New York.

== Death ==
Jones died in Baldwinsville, New York, on March 29, 1861 (age 60 years, 224 days). He is interred at Riverside Cemetery, Baldwinsville, New York.

U.S. House of Representatives
Preceded by Daniel Gott	Member of the U.S. House of Representatives from New York's 24th congressional district March 4, 1851 – March 3, 1855	Succeeded by Amos P. Granger
