= Chemung County Courthouse Complex =

- U.S. National Register of Historic Places
- U.S. Historic district
- New York State Register of Historic Places
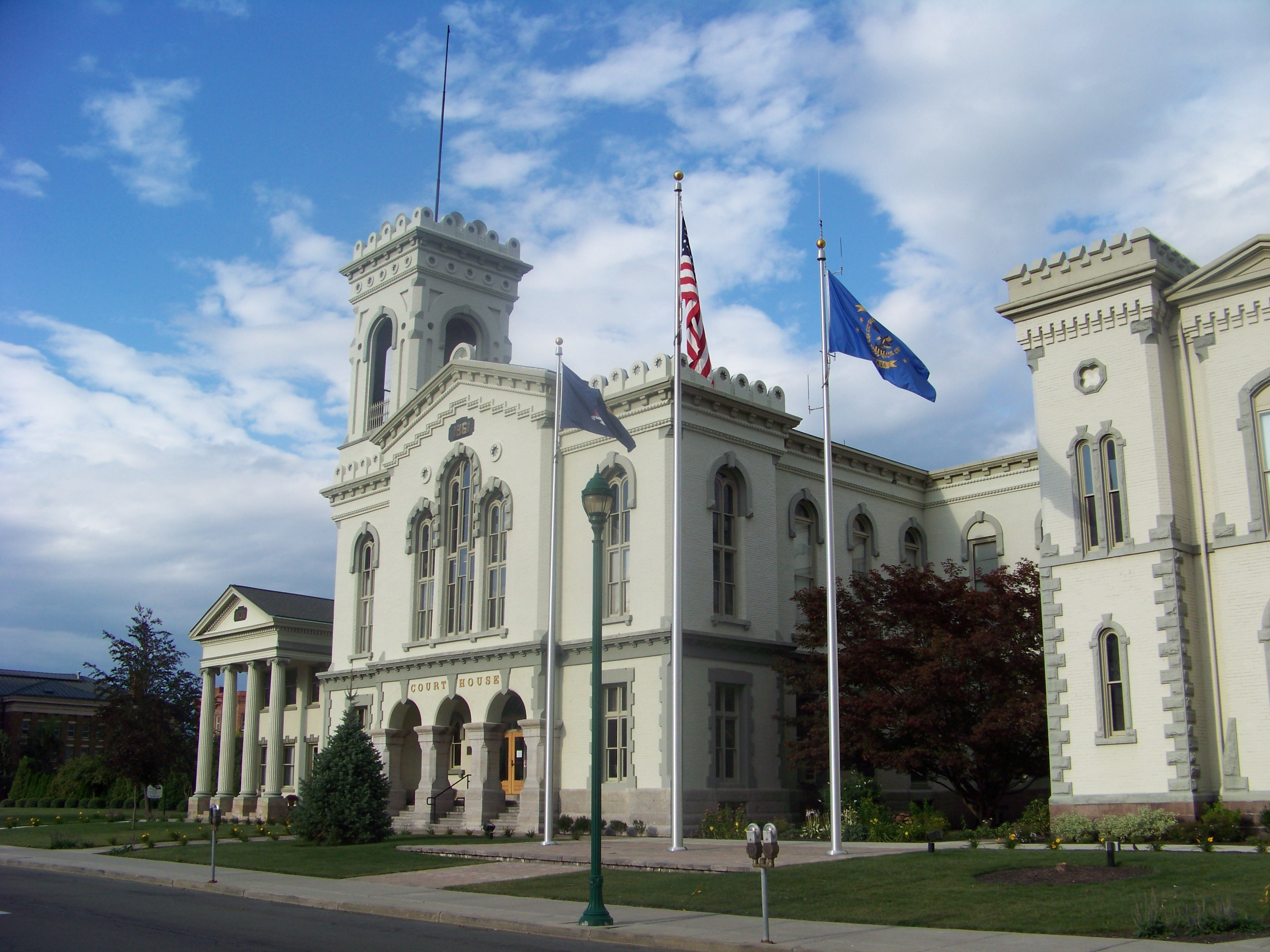

- Location within New York Location within the United States
- Interactive map showing the location for Chemung County Courthouse
- Location: Elmira, New York
- Coordinates: 42°5′26″N 76°48′7″W
- Built: 1836
- Architect: Horatio Nelson White
- NRHP reference No.: 71000531
- NYSRHP No.: 01540.000002

Significant dates
- Added to NRHP: August 12, 1971
- Designated NYSRHP: June 23, 1980

The Chemung County Courthouse Complex consists of four buildings built between 1836 and 1899. The oldest building, built in 1836, is the District Attorney's and Treasurer's Building. The centerpiece, the courthouse itself, was designed by Horatio Nelson White, and built in 1861–62. These were followed by the County Clerk's Office in 1875 and the addition of the Court House Annex in 1895. The complex was added to the National Register of Historic Places in 1971.
