= Charles B. Sedgwick =

American politician (1815–1883)

Charles Sedwick
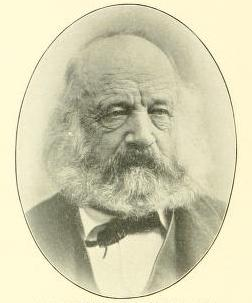

Chair of the House Naval Affairs Committee
- In office 1861–1863

Member of the U.S. House of Representatives from New York's 24th district
- In office March 4, 1859 – March 3, 1863
- Preceded by: Amos P. Granger
- Succeeded by: Theodore M. Pomeroy

Personal details
- Born: March 15, 1815 Pompey, New York, U.S.
- Died: February 3, 1883 (aged 67) Syracuse, New York, U.S.
- Resting place: Oakwood Cemetery
- Party: Republican
- Relations: Henry J. Sedgwick (brother)
- Education: Hamilton College

Charles Baldwin Sedgwick (March 15, 1815 – February 3, 1883) was an American lawyer and politician from New York who served as a member of the United States House of Representatives for New York's 24th congressional district from 1859 to 1863.

== Early life and education ==
Sedgwick, the son of Stephen Sedgwick and Anna Baldwin, was born March 15, 1815, in Pompey, New York, and attended Pompey Hill Academy and Hamilton College. He studied law, was admitted to the bar in 1848, and commenced practice in Syracuse, New York.

== Career ==
Sedgwick was elected as a Republican to the 36th and 37th United States Congresses, holding office from March 4, 1859, to March 3, 1863. He was chairman of the United States House Committee on Naval Affairs during the 37th Congress.

He engaged for the next two years in codifying naval laws for the United States Department of the Navy at Washington, D.C., and then resumed the practice of law in Syracuse.

On April 19, 1865, Sedgwick performed a eulogy at Hanover Square after the assassination of Abraham Lincoln.

== Personal life and death ==
State Senator Henry J. Sedgwick was his brother. He died February 3, 1883, aged 67.
