= Amos P. Granger =

American politician

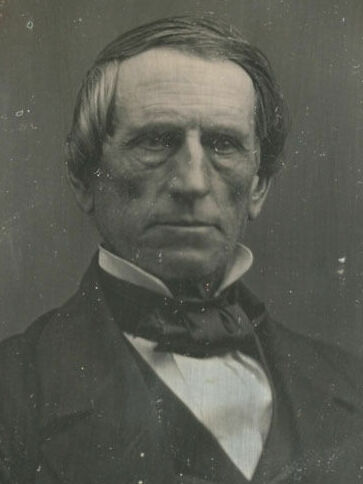

Member of the U.S. House of Representatives from New York's 24th district
- In office March 4, 1855 – March 3, 1859
- Preceded by: Daniel T. Jones
- Succeeded by: Charles B. Sedgwick

Personal details
- Born: June 3, 1789 Suffield, Connecticut, U.S.
- Died: August 20, 1866 (aged 77) Syracuse, New York, U.S.
- Party: Whig, Republican
- Spouse: Charlotte Hickox (m. 1813)
- Relations: Francis Granger (cousin); Gideon Granger (uncle)
- Parent(s): Amos Granger; Ann Phelps

Amos Phelps Granger (June 3, 1789 – August 20, 1866) was a U.S. Representative from New York, cousin of Francis Granger. Granger served as a captain in the War of 1812.

== Early life ==
Granger was born in Suffield, Connecticut on June 3, 1789. He was the youngest of four children born to Dr. Amos Granger (1748–1811) and Ann Phelps (1753–1806). His father was a medical doctor who served in the Connecticut Legislature from 1788 to 1791 and also served in the militia alongside General Horatio Gates during the American Revolutionary War He was a first cousin of fellow U.S. Representative Francis Granger through his uncle, Gideon Granger, the longest-serving United States Postmaster General (under Presidents Thomas Jefferson and James Madison).

Granger attended the public schools.

== Career ==
In 1811, he moved to Manlius, New York, where he was president of the town for several years. He served as captain in the War of 1812 at Sackets Harbor and on the Canada–US border.

He moved to Syracuse, New York, in 1820 and engaged in numerous business enterprises. He served as trustee of the city of Syracuse from 1825 to 1830, during which time he delivered the address of welcome to General Lafayette when he visited Syracuse in 1825. He served as delegate to the Whig National Convention in 1852.

Granger was elected as a Whig candidate to the Thirty-fourth Congress, and reelected as a Republican to the Thirty-fifth Congress from March 4, 1855, to March 3, 1859. He was not a candidate for renomination in 1858 and retired from active business pursuits.

== Personal life ==
On December 21, 1813, Granger was married to Charlotte Hickox (1790–1882), one of twelve children of Benjamin Hickox. They did not have any children together.

He was paralysed by a stroke in about 1860, and died after a bout of dysentery in Syracuse, New York, on August 20, 1866. He was interred in Oakwood Cemetery.

U.S. House of Representatives
Preceded by Daniel T. Jones	Member of the U.S. House of Representatives from New York's 24th congressional district March 4, 1855 – March 3, 1859	Succeeded by Charles B. Sedgwick
