= Grace Episcopal Church (Syracuse, New York) =

Historic church in New York, United States

Grace Church
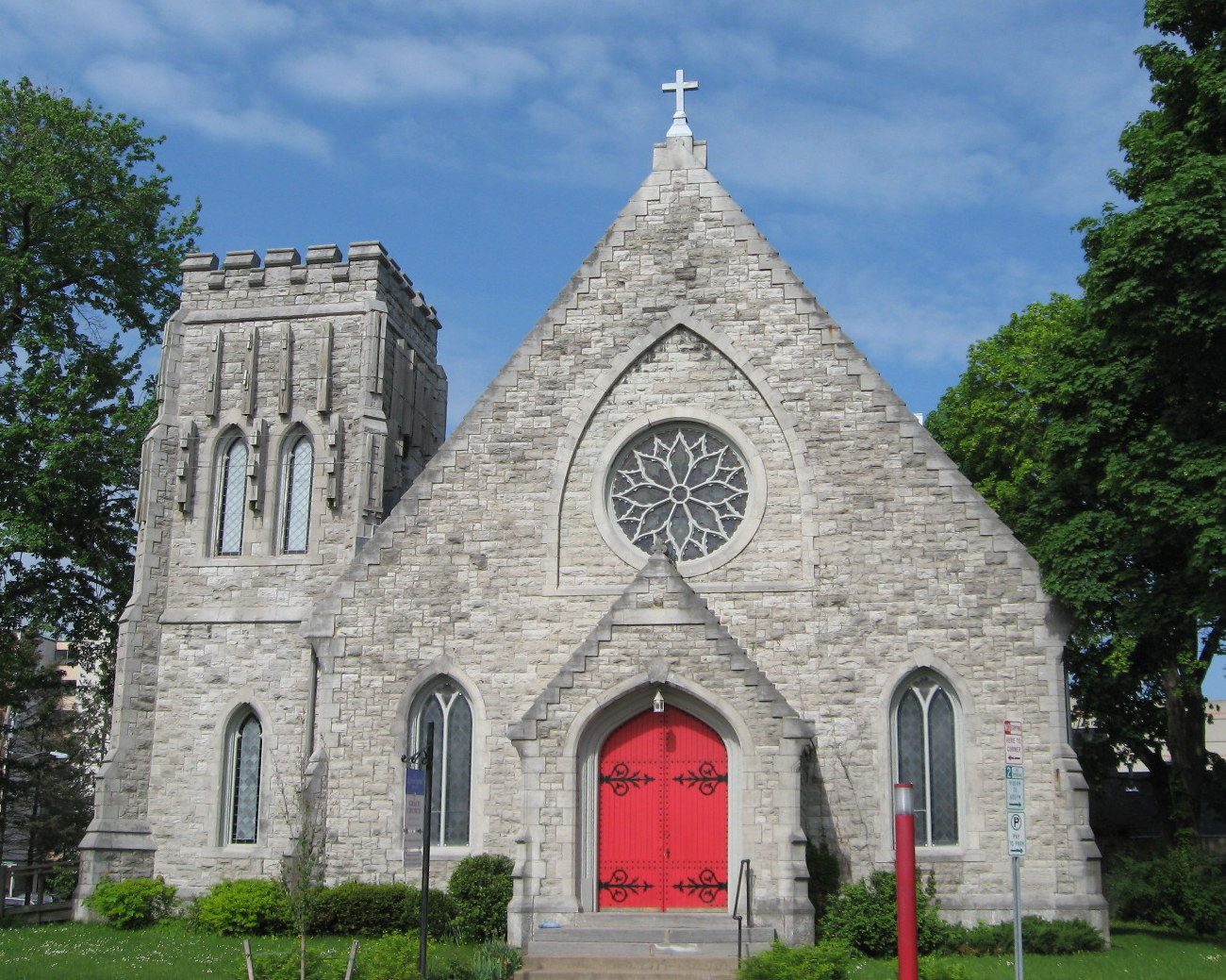
- Grace Episcopal Church in 2015
- Grace Church
- Location: 819 Madison St, Syracuse, New York 13210
- Country: United States
- Denomination: Episcopal Church (United States)
- Website: gracesyracuse.org

Administration
- Division: Province II

Clergy
- Rector: Rev. Dr. Steve Moore
- Grace Episcopal Church
- U.S. National Register of Historic Places
- Location within New York Location within the United States
- Location: 819 Madison Avenue, Syracuse, New York
- Coordinates: 43°2′44.08″N 76°8′5.17″W
- Built: 1876
- Architect: Horatio Nelson White
- Architectural style: Stone Gothic Revival
- NRHP reference No.: 73001235
- Added to NRHP: March 20, 1973

Grace Episcopal Church is an historic Episcopal parish in Syracuse, New York. The Gothic Revival building was designed by Horatio Nelson White and was built in 1876. It is located at 819 Madison Avenue near Syracuse University. On March 20, 1973, it was listed on the National Register of Historic Places.

== History ==
The Grace Church parish was founded in 1871. The current building was constructed in 1876.

Grace Church has a long history of social activism. In the late 1900s, the church baptized and ordained David Pendleton Oakerhater, a Cheyenne warrior and political prisoner. Oakerhater devoted his life to serving his people and the Episcopal Church. In 1992, Oakerhater was elevated to sainthood within the Episcopal Church. Grace Church is a national shrine for Saint Oakerhater - the first Native Episcopal saint. In 2004, windows were installed in his honor and in 2005, a celebration with Saint Oakerhater's descendants was held at Grace.

In 1957, Grace Church joined with St. Philip's - a historically black Episcopal Church - establishing Grace as one of the first fully integrated Episcopal churches in the nation.

In the 1960s, Grace led the city's churches in its commitment to civil rights. Grace's activism included providing a home to one of the first Head Start programs, offering training for Peace Corps, and Vista volunteers, and holding meetings of the Congress for Racial Equality (CORE).

In 1974, Betty Bone Scheiss of Grace was ordained three years prior to the Episcopal General Convention's recognition of women priests. She became associate rector.

In 2008, Grace was one of the first diocesan parishes to participate in Central New York Lesbian, Gay, Bisexual and Transgender Pride.

== Grace today ==
Grace Episcopal Church continues to be an active social justice parish in the Episcopal Diocese of Central New York. Its congregation is among the most racially integrated in the nation, and Grace remains a welcoming parish to people of all races, ethnicity, theological backgrounds, sexual orientation and gender identity.

== See also ==
- List of Registered Historic Places in Onondaga County, New York
- Grace Episcopal Church (disambiguation)
