= Park Church =

Historic church in New York, United States

- U.S. National Register of Historic Places
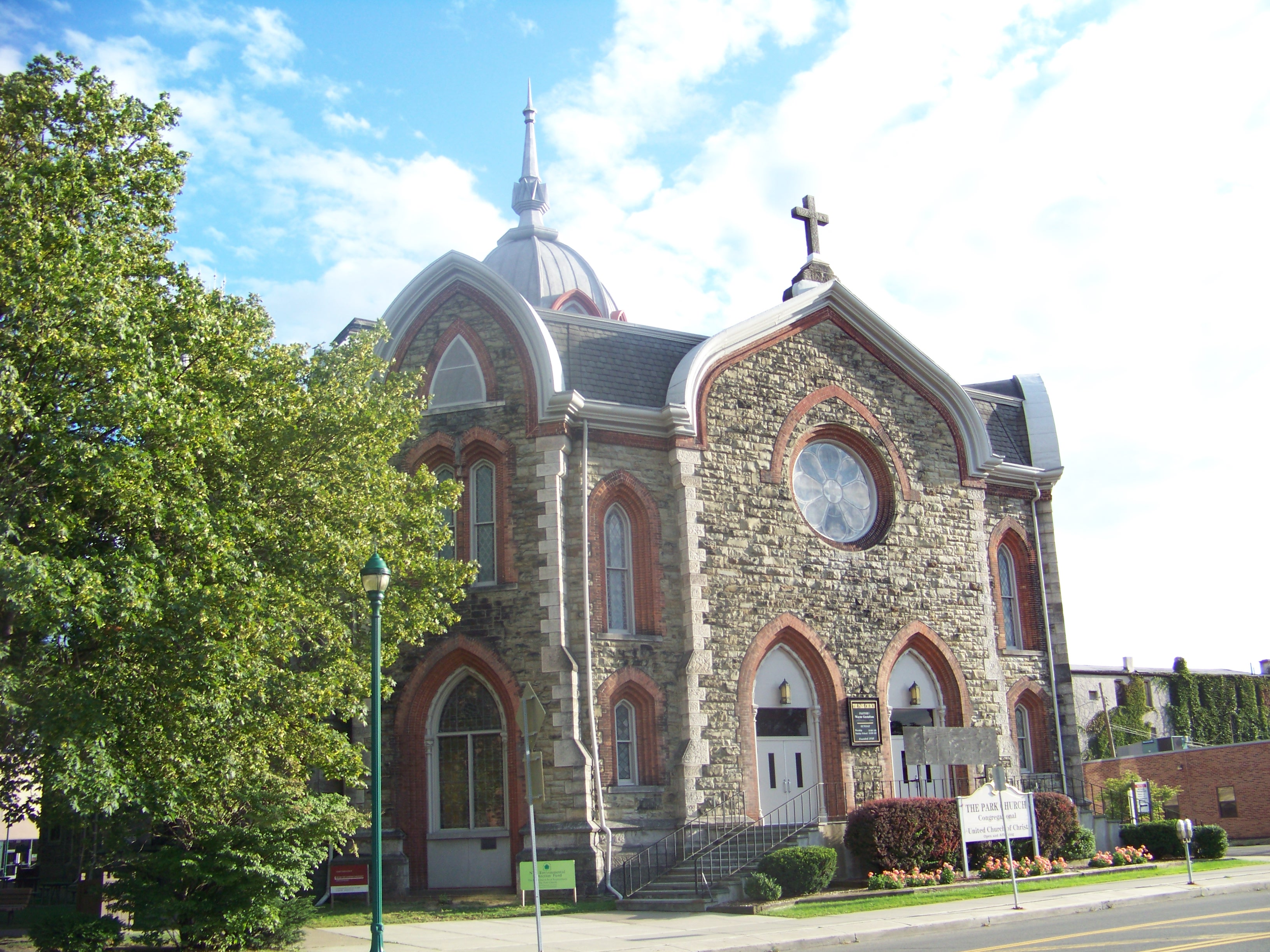

- Location within New York Location within the United States
- Location: 208 W. Gray St., Elmira, New York
- Coordinates: 42°5′21″N 76°48′33″W
- Area: less than one acre
- Built: 1872
- Architect: White, Horatio Nelson
- Architectural style: Late Victorian, Eclectic
- NRHP reference No.: 77000936
- Added to NRHP: May 25, 1977

Park Church runs the length of an entire city block in Elmira, New York. The church was constructed from 1874 through 1876, replacing its much smaller, wooden predecessor. It was designed by Horatio Nelson White. The design of the limestone and brick church is highly eclectic.

Besides its architecture, the church is significant for its congregation of abolitionists and humanitarians. From 1854 until his death in 1900, Thomas Kennicott Beecher was the pastor of Park Church. Beecher, together with his twelve siblings including author Harriet Beecher Stowe, was brought up by liberal reformist clergyman Lyman Beecher.

== Gallery ==
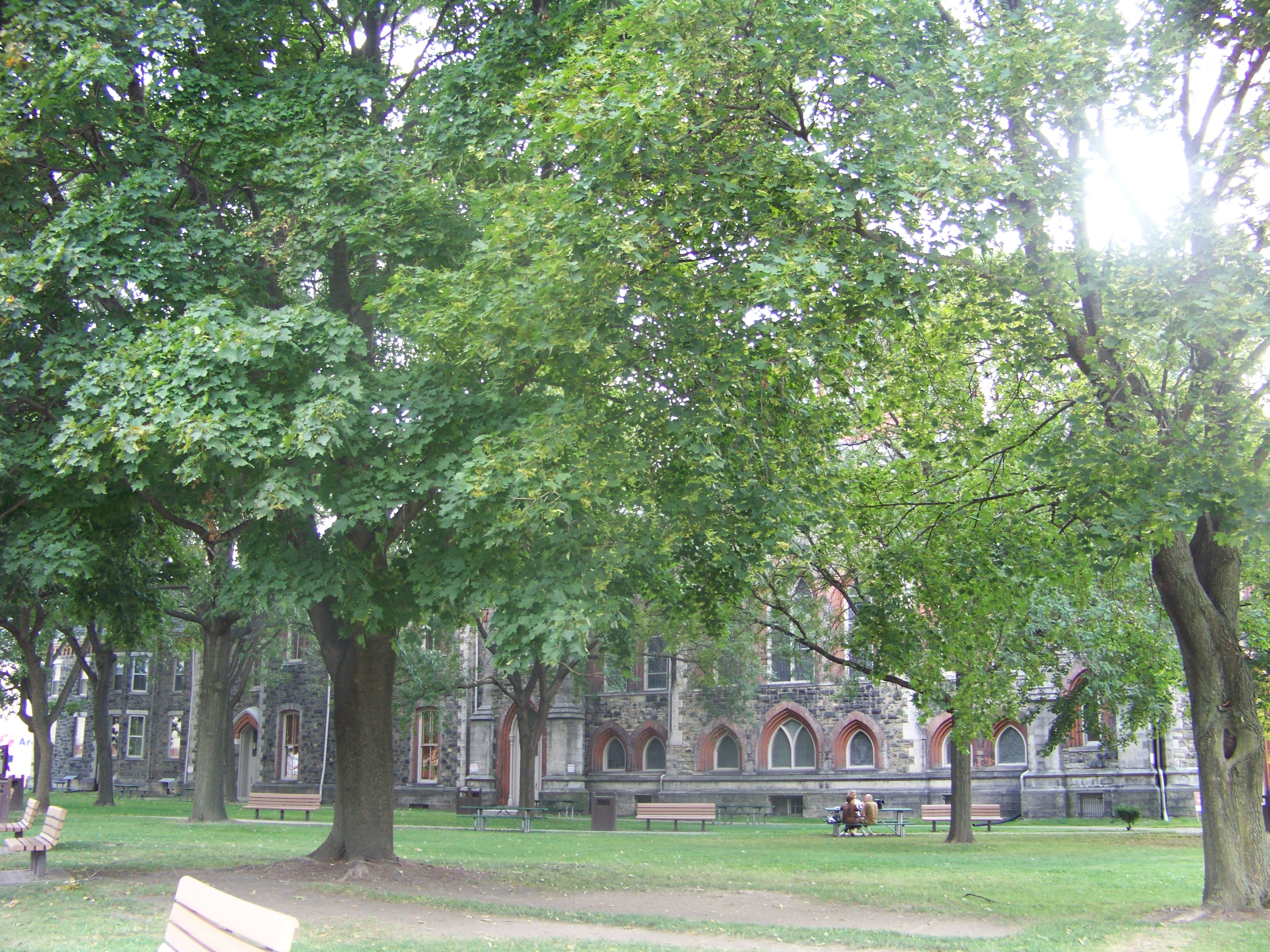
Side view
