= Elijah Rhoades =

American politician

Elijah Rhoades (March 7, 1791 Chesterfield, Hampshire County, Massachusetts – February 9, 1858 Pittsfield, Berkshire County, Massachusetts) was an American politician from New York.

== Life ==
He was the son of Joseph Rhoades and Salome (Rust) Rhoades. He graduated from Williams College in 1813. On March 4, 1818, he married Louisa Gardiner, a sister of Chief Judge Addison Gardiner (1797–1883). They had no children, but adopted a daughter. He was Clerk of Onondaga County from 1838 to 1840.

He was a member of the New York State Senate (7th D.) from 1841 to 1844, sitting in the 64th, 65th, 66th and 67th New York State Legislatures.

At the New York state election, 1844, he ran on the Whig ticket for one of four vacancies as Canal Commissioner, but was defeated by the Democratic candidates. He was a delegate to the New York State Constitutional Convention of 1846.

== Sources ==
- The New York Civil List compiled by Franklin Benjamin Hough (pages 59, 133f, 144 and 391; Weed, Parsons and Co., 1858)
- The History of the Descendants of Elder John Strong, of Nirthampton, Mass. by Benjamin Woodbridge Dwight (Albany, 1871; Vol. II, pg. 1139)

New York State Senate
Preceded by Samuel L. Edwards	New York State Senate; Seventh District (Class 2); 1841–1844	Succeeded by Henry J. Sedgwick
