= Hanover Square, Syracuse =

- Hanover Square Historic District
- U.S. National Register of Historic Places
- U.S. Historic district
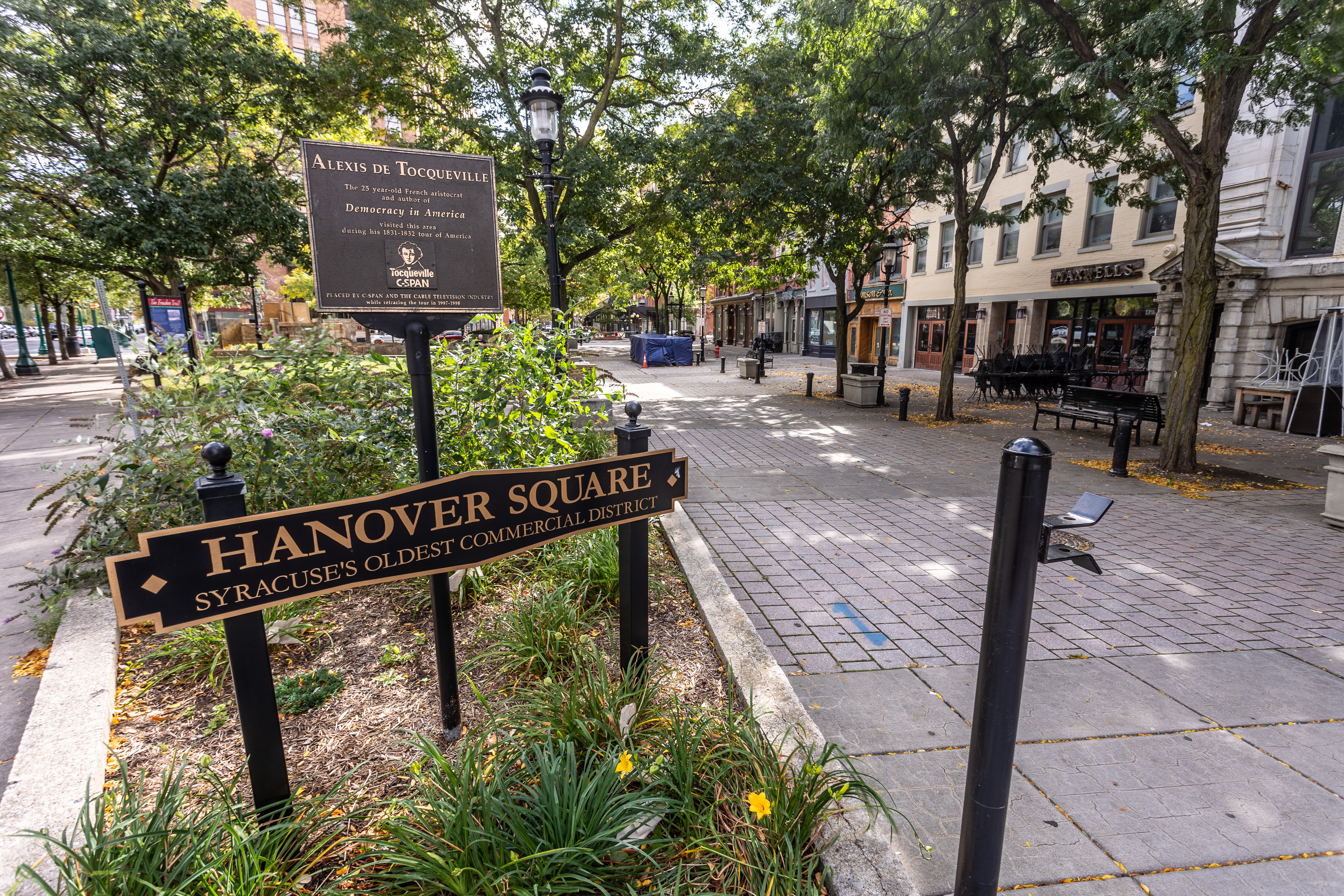

- Location within New York Location within the United States
- Location: 101--203 E. Water, 120--200 E. Genesee, 113 Salina, 109--114 S. Warren Sts., Syracuse, New York
- Coordinates: 43°3′1″N 76°9′3″W
- Built: 1834
- Architect: Multiple
- Architectural style: Second Empire, Romanesque, Federal
- NRHP reference No.: 76001258
- Added to NRHP: June 22, 1976

Hanover Square in downtown Syracuse is actually a triangle at the intersection of Warren, Water, and East Genesee Streets. The name may also refer to the larger Hanover Square Historic District which includes seventeen historic buildings in the area that was the first commercial district in Syracuse. In the warm weather months, entertainment is common on the plaza around the fountain. Workers in the surrounding office buildings and retail establishments often lunch there.

== History ==
When Syracuse was still a village, the village well was located in Hanover Square. Listed on the National Register of Historic Places since 1976, the square is an intact, mainly nineteenth century historic district. The buildings on Water Street were backed by the Erie Canal, and were known as “double-enders.” This facilitated the unloading of goods from barges on the canal. Civil War recruiting booths were set up in the square, and were made into a huge bonfire at the end of the war.

== Hanover Square Historic District contributing Properties ==
The 17 properties can be visited in order, starting at South Salina Street and Water Street, going east on Water Street, turning south on Warren Street, and returning on the diagonal along East Genesee Street to Water.

	Landmark name	Image	Date Built	Style	Location	Description
1	Gridley Building		1867	Second Empire	101 East Water Street	Also known as the Onondaga County Savings Bank Building; 3½ stories; 100 foot clock tower; built of Onondaga limestone; Horatio Nelson White, architect
2	Gere Bank Building		1894	Louis Sullivan type	121 East Water Street	5 stories; built of granite, brick and terra cotta; Charles Colton, architect
3	Phoenix Buildings (portion)		1834	Federal	123 East Water Street	4 stories; brick
4	Phillips Block		1834	Federal	125-127 East Water Street	4 stories; brick
5	Phoenix Buildings (portion)		1834	Federal	129 East Water Street	4 stories; brick
6	Dana Building		1837, 1861	Federal, Italianate	135 East Water Street	Italianate top floor added in 1861; 4 stories; brick
7	Grange Building		1925	Commercial	203 East Water Street	Originally an auto dealership; 4 stories; brown brick
8	State Tower Building		1927	Art Deco	109 South Warren Street	22 stories; brick and limestone; Thompson and Churchill, architects
9	Granger Block		1869, 1894	Renaissance Revival	200 East Genesee Street	Also known as the SA&K (Sedgwick, Andrews and Kennedy) Building and Ferary Building; first 4 stories built in 1869; upper three stories added in 1894; brick
10	Larned Building		1869	Second Empire	114 South Warren Street	5 stories; brick
11	Post Standard Building		1880	Richardsonian Romanesque	136 East Genesee Street	5 stories; brick
12	Franklin Buildings (portion)		1870	Second Empire	134 East Genesee Street	4½ stories; brick
13	Franklin Buildings (portion)			Federal	132 East Genesee Street	4 stories; stone
14	Franklin Buildings (portion)		1834	Federal	128 East Genesee Street	4 stories; brick
15	Franklin Buildings (portion)		1839	Federal	122-126 East Genesee Street	5 stories; brick
16	Flagship Securities Building		1896	Neo-Classical	120 East Genesee Street	3 stories; marble and brick; Albert L. Brockway, architect; first steel-framed building in downtown Syracuse
17	Onondaga County Savings Bank		1896	Neo-Classical	113 South Salina Street	9½ stories; granite and limestone; R.W. Gibson, architect; Angelo Magnanti designed plaster ceiling; William Teff Schwartz murals of Onondaga County history

== Today ==
In addition to modern businesses, eateries and stores, loft-style apartments have been created on the upper floors of some of Hanover Square's historic buildings.

The 23-floor State Tower Building overlooking the square hosts offices and is a major telecommunications hub for downtown Syracuse.
