= Gridley Building =

Historic commercial building in New York, United States

- Onondaga County Savings Bank Building
- U.S. National Register of Historic Places
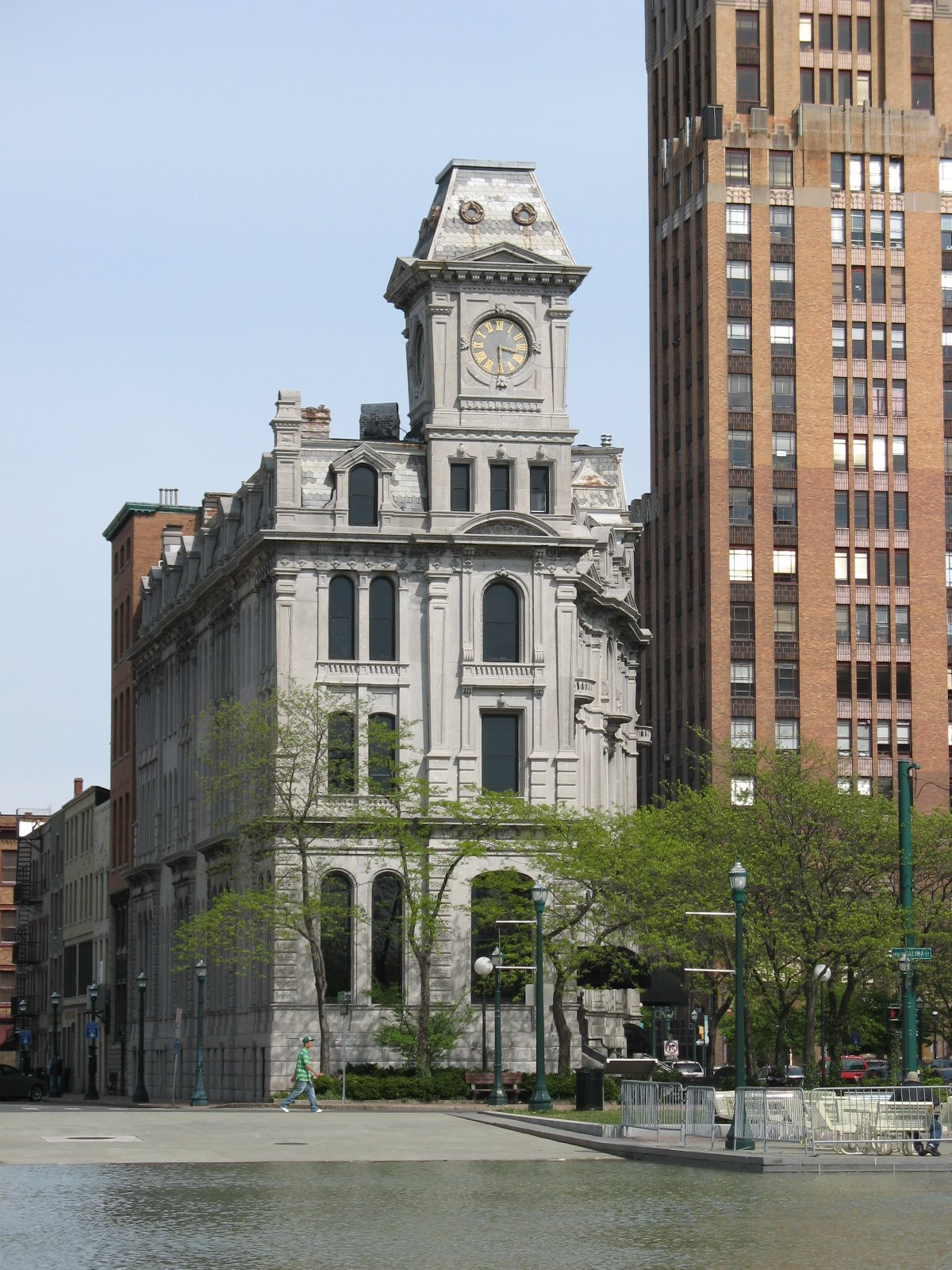

- Location within New York Location within the United States
- Location: 101 S. Salina Street, Syracuse, New York
- Coordinates: 43°3′2.62″N 76°9′6.3″W
- Built: 1867
- Architect: Horatio Nelson White
- NRHP reference No.: 71000550
- Added to NRHP: February 24, 1971

The Gridley Building, built in 1867 and known previously as the Onondaga County Savings Bank Building, is a prominent historic building on Clinton Square and Hanover Square in Syracuse, New York, United States. It was designed by Horatio Nelson White and was built adjacent to what was then the Erie Canal and is now Erie Boulevard.

== History ==
Gridley Building

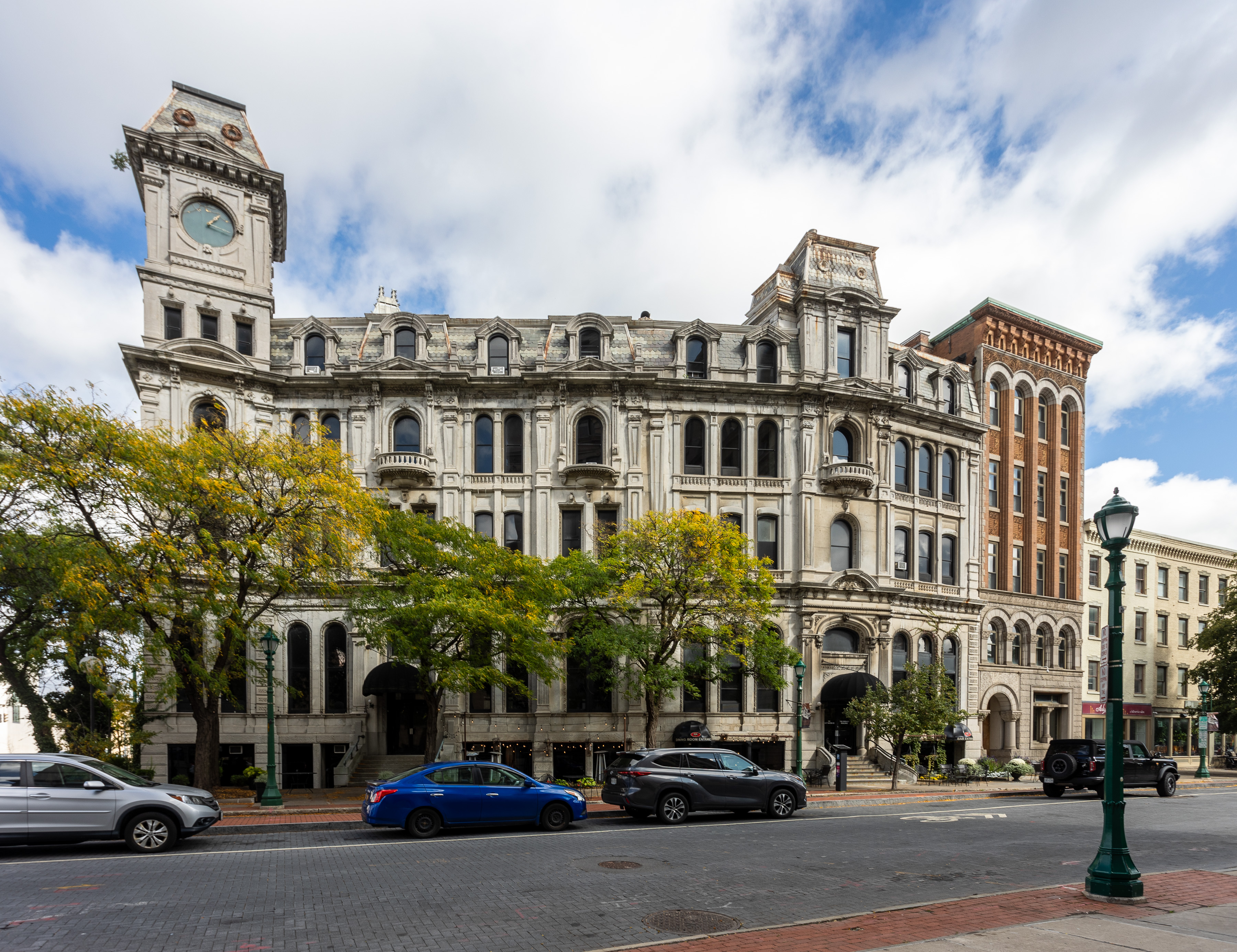
Water Street facade; Gere Bank Building at right.

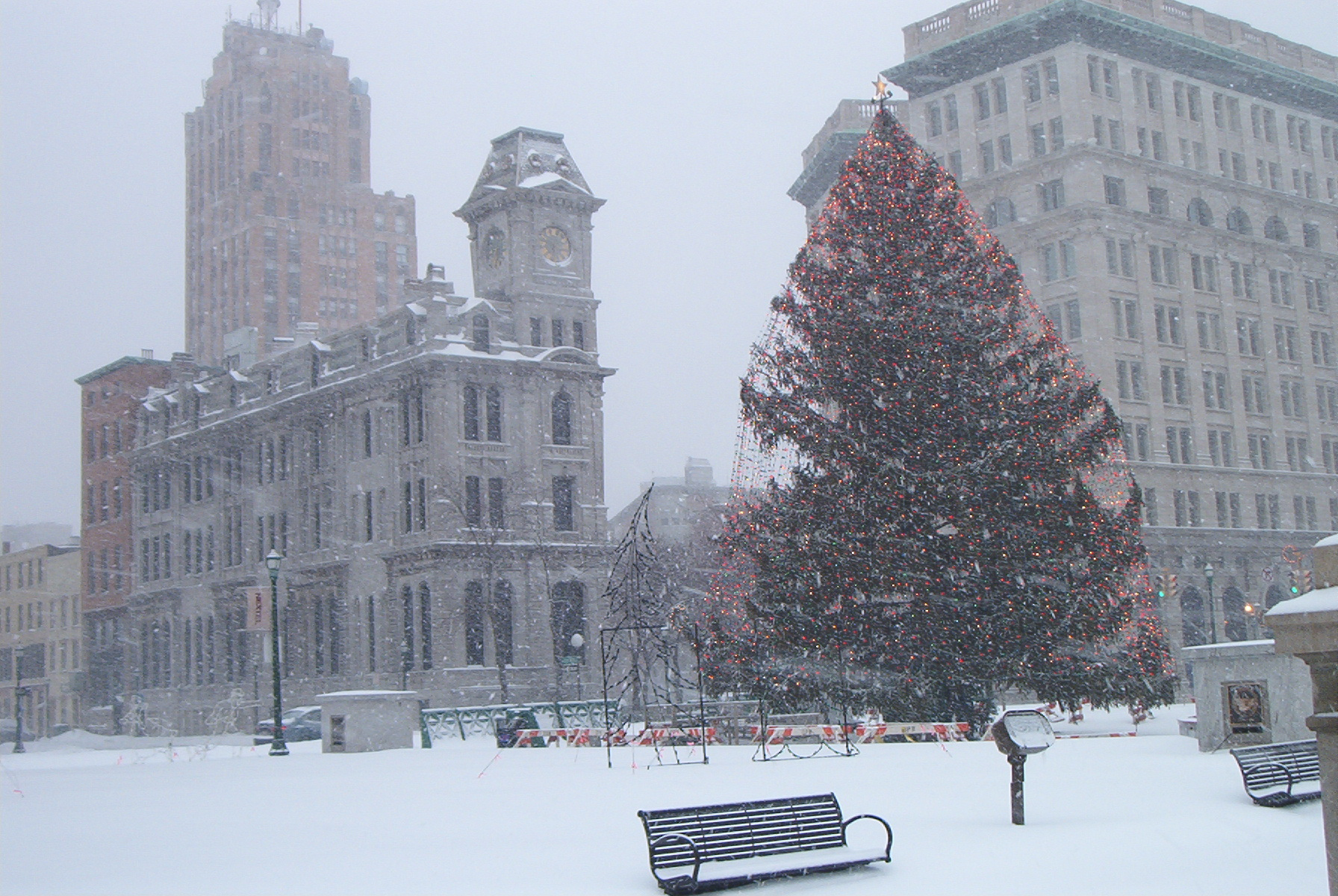
2007 snowstorm

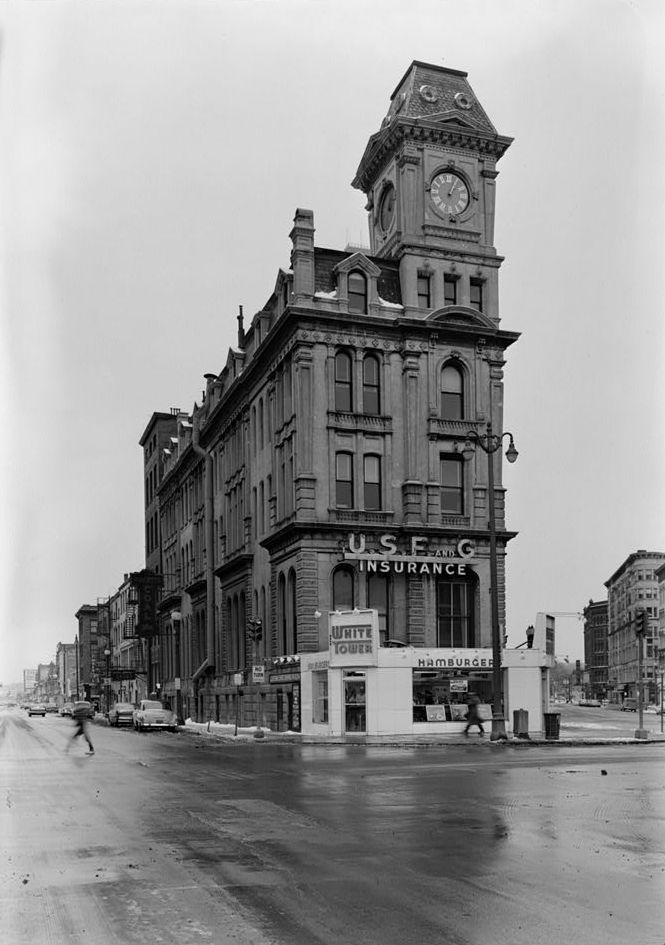
1962

The address of the Gridley Building is 101 S. Salina Street, according to the 1970 National Register of Historic Places nomination form. Five years later, the Hanover Square Historic District nomination listed its address as 101 East Water Street.

The Syracuse Savings Bank Building is located directly across Erie Boulevard.

It was listed on the National Register of Historic Places in 1971.

== Influence ==
The architect for Gridley Building, Horatio Nelson White, also designed the Hall of Languages in 1870 with the very similar style. It was the first building on Syracuse University campus, and is often prominently displayed as a representation of the University in many forums.

== See also ==
- Syracuse Savings Bank Building
- National Register of Historic Places listings in Syracuse, New York
