= Plymouth Congregational Church (Syracuse, New York) =

Historic church in New York, United States

- U.S. National Register of Historic Places
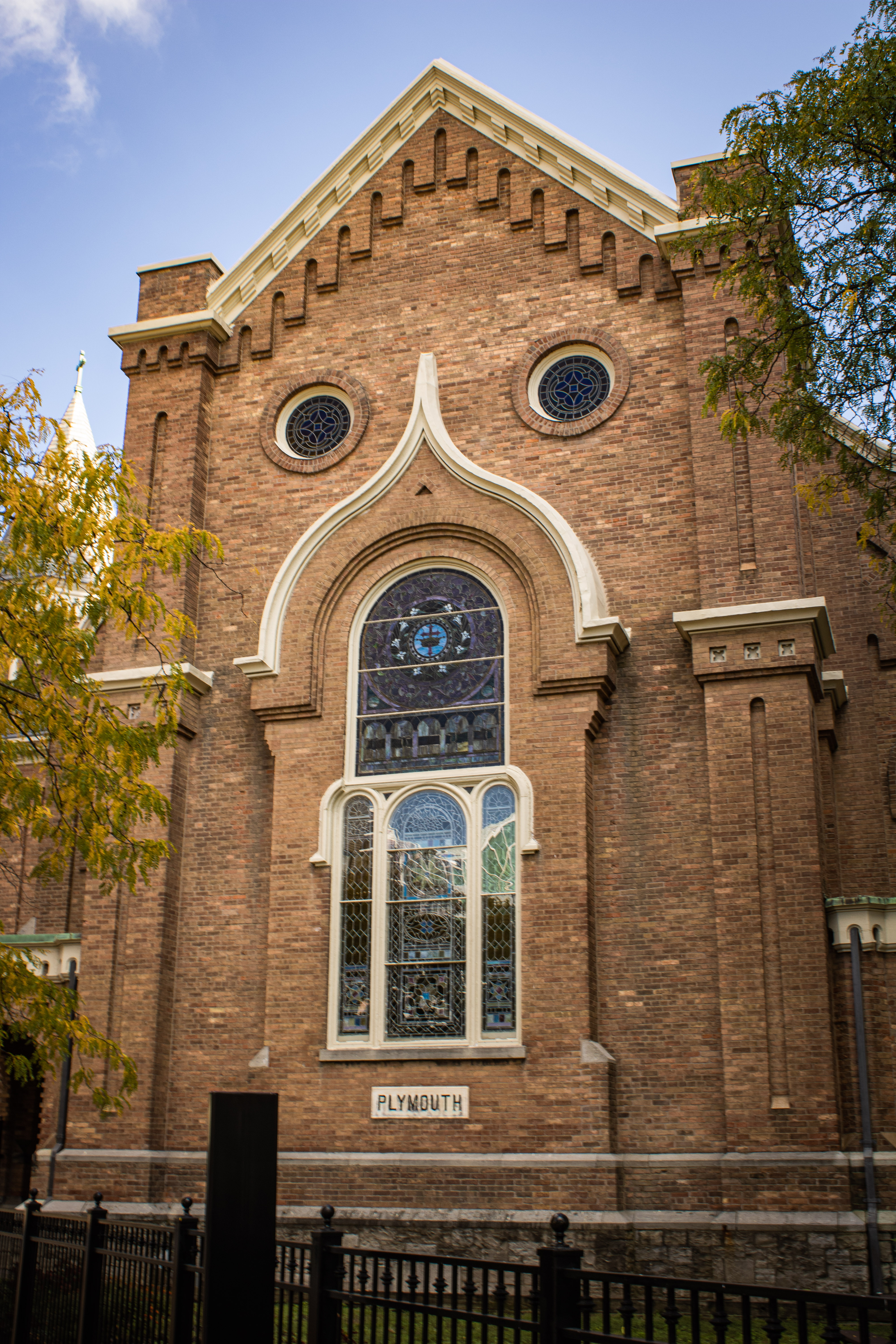
- Plymouth Congregational Church, October 2021

- Location within New York Location within the United States
- Location: 232 E. Onondaga St., Syracuse, New York
- Coordinates: 43°2′44.4″N 76°9′.03″W
- Built: 1858
- Architect: multiple
- Architectural style: Mid 19th Century Revival
- NRHP reference No.: 97001384
- Added to NRHP: November 07, 1997

Plymouth Congregational Church is located on East Onondaga Street in Syracuse, New York. It was designed in 1858 by Horatio Nelson White in the Romanesque Revival style. The founding congregation was closely associated with the abolitionist movement in Syracuse. It was listed on the National Register of Historic Places in 1997.
