= Hall of Languages, Syracuse University =

NHRP building in Syracuse, New York

- U.S. National Register of Historic Places
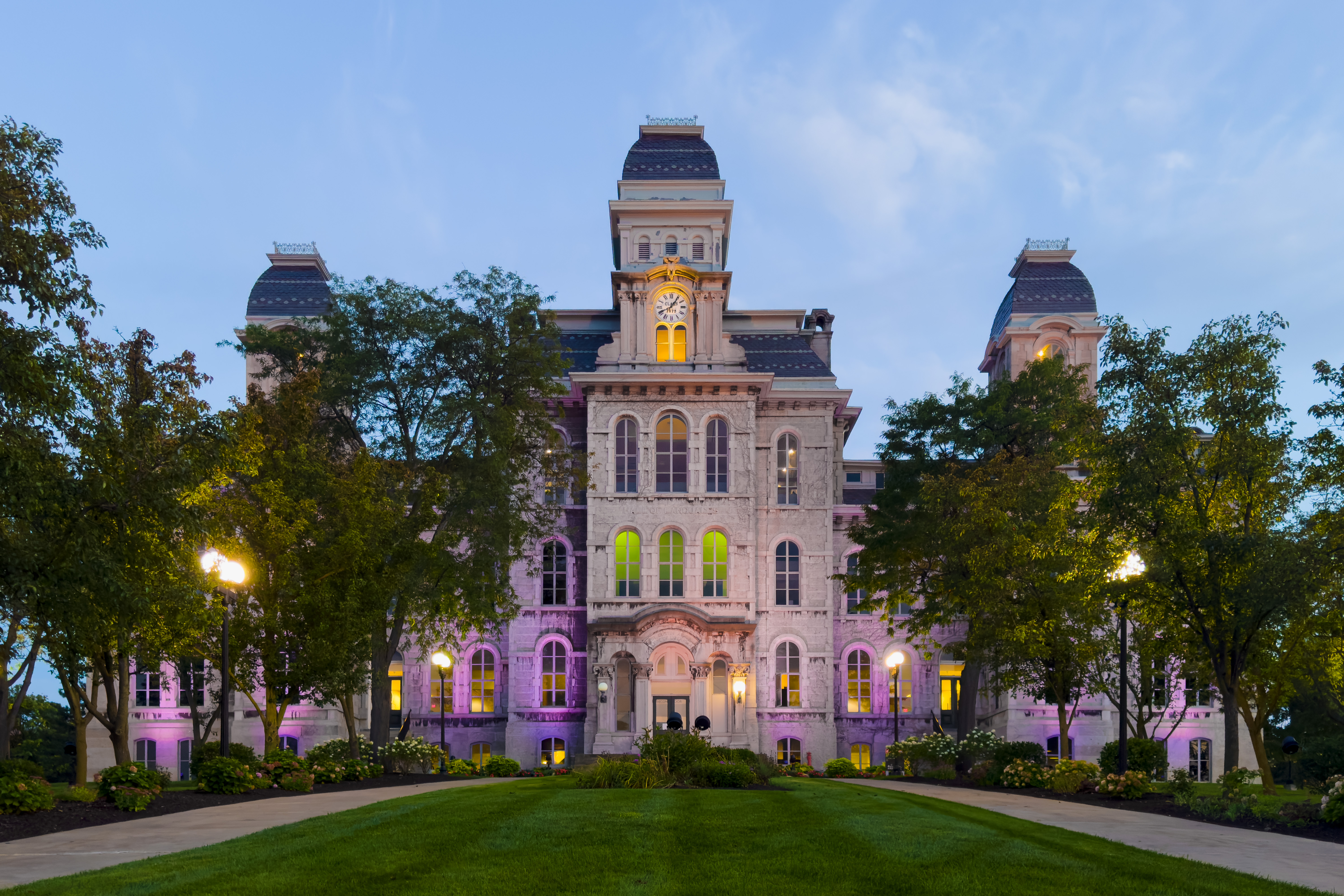

- Location within New York Location within the United States
- Location: Syracuse, New York, U.S.
- Coordinates: 43°2′19″N 76°8′4″W
- Built: 1871
- Built by: Randall and Nesdal
- Architect: Horatio Nelson White
- Architectural style: Second Empire
- Restored: 1978–79
- Part of: Syracuse University – Comstock Tract buildings (ID80004279; listed separately in 1973)
- NRHP reference No.: 73001236
- Added to NRHP: September 20, 1973

The Hall of Languages is a Syracuse University building designed by Horatio Nelson White in the Second Empire architectural style, and built in 1871–73. It was the first building constructed on the Syracuse University campus and the building originally housed the entire university.

The building's cornerstone was laid on August 31, 1871, by Jesse Truesdell Peck, and the building was dedicated on May 8, 1873, by Edmund S. James, then Bishop of the New York Conference. It is styled after the Gridley Building in Downtown Syracuse, which was also designed by the same architect. It features three large towers or cupolas and is made of Onondaga limestone and wood framing with interior cast-iron columns. The original building consisted of the east and west towers only; in 1886 the central tower was added. It was originally home to the College of Liberal Arts (now defunct), and subsequently the College of Arts and Sciences.

It was listed on the National Register of Historic Places in 1973. The interior was completely rebuilt in 1978–79.

The iconic building has been prominently displayed as a representation of the university in many forums. The building served as creative inspiration for the Addams Family home in the TV show. Most recently starting in 2010 the Syracuse Orange men's basketball team started wearing Nike jerseys that feature an aerographic of the Hall of Languages.

== Gallery ==
Hall of Languages
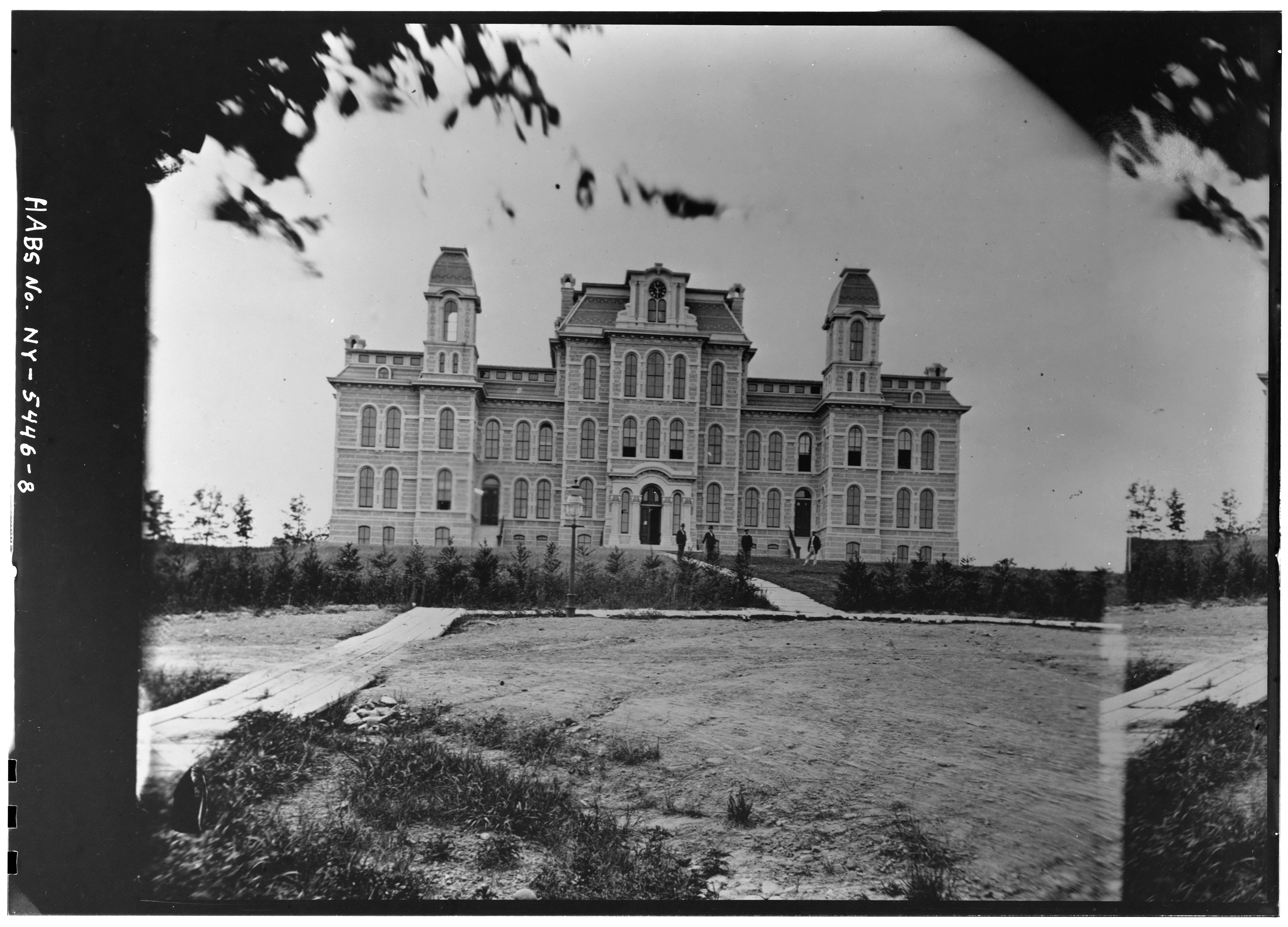
Circa 1876

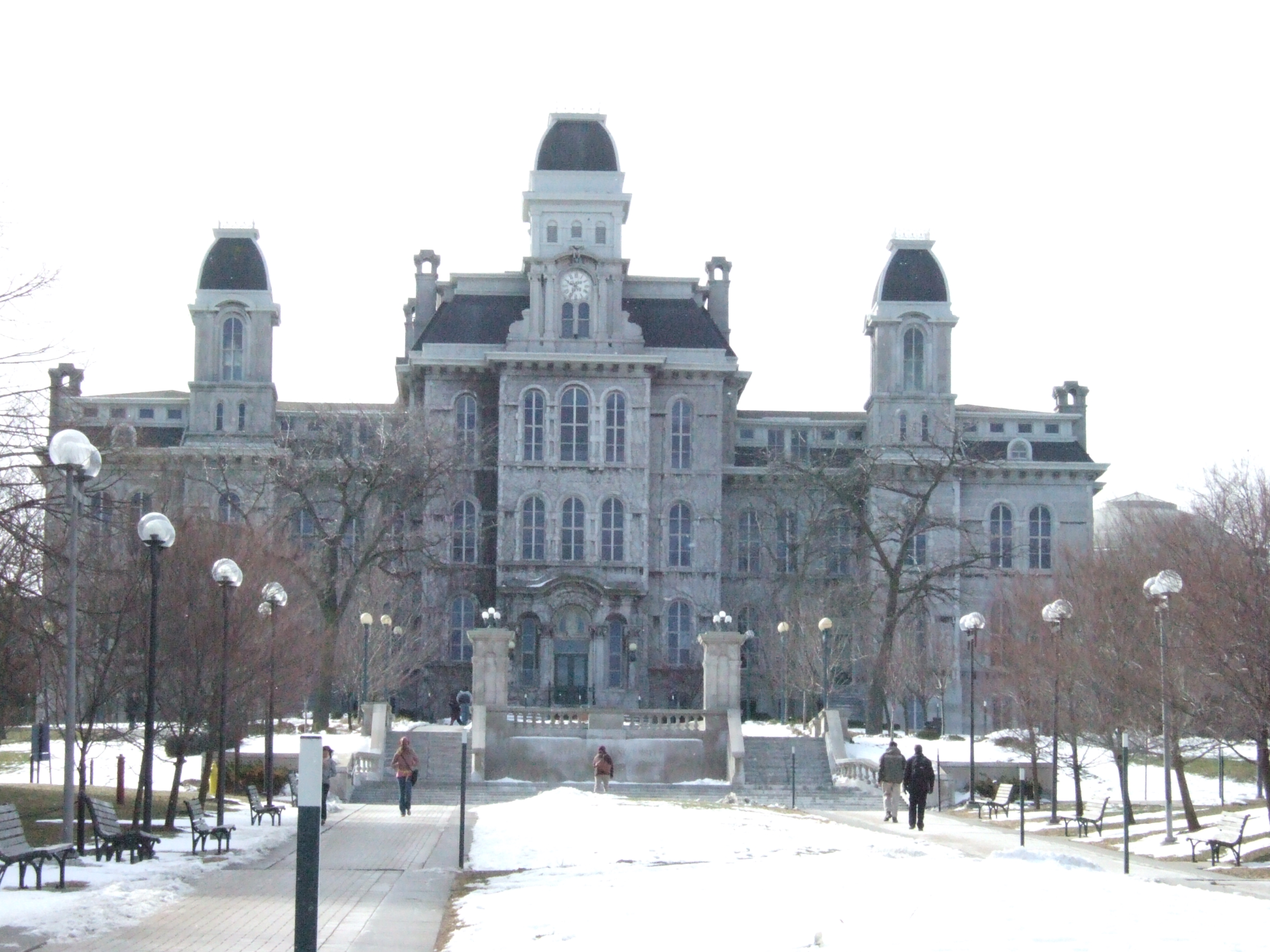
Looking from University Ave in winter

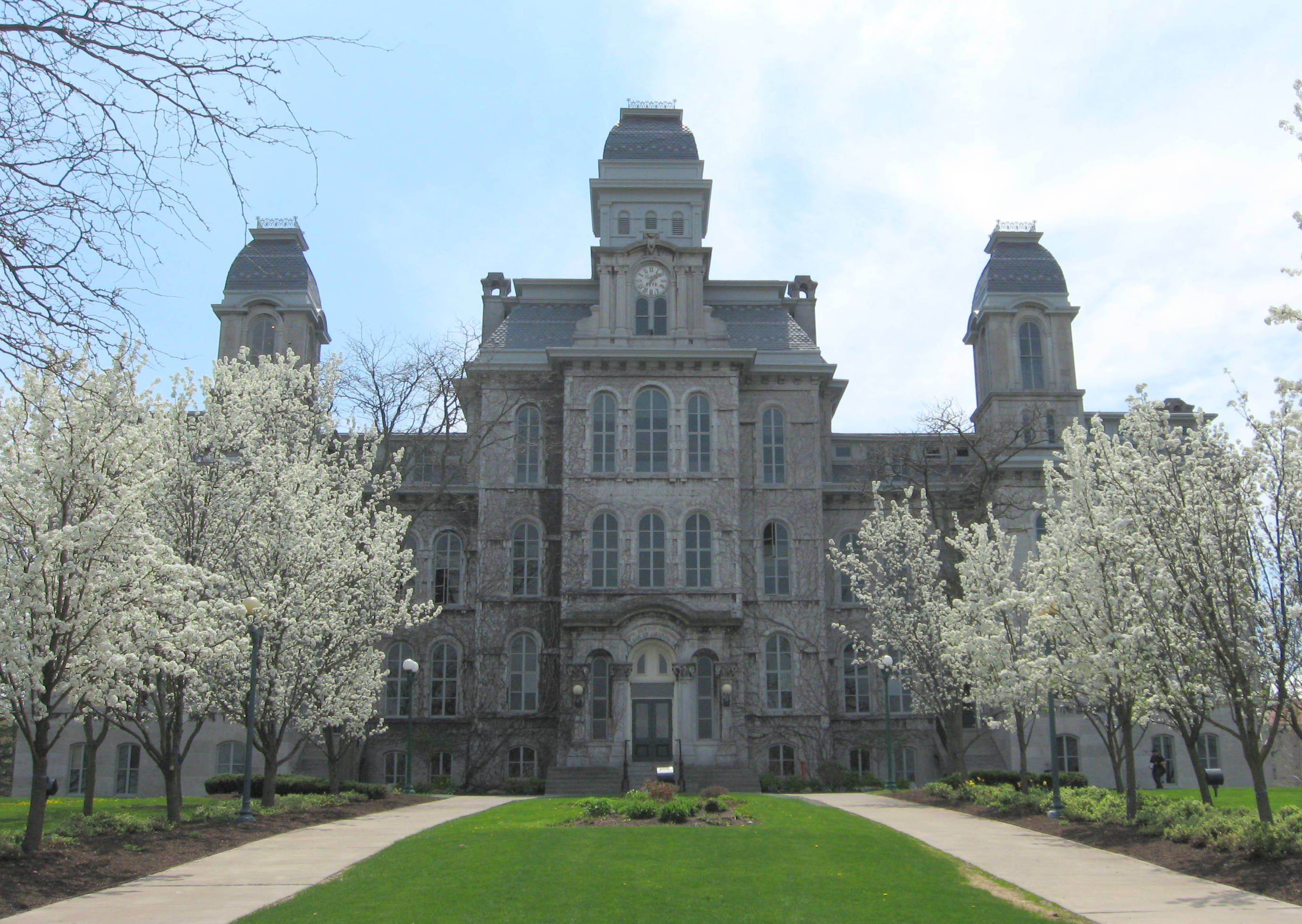
Front view in spring

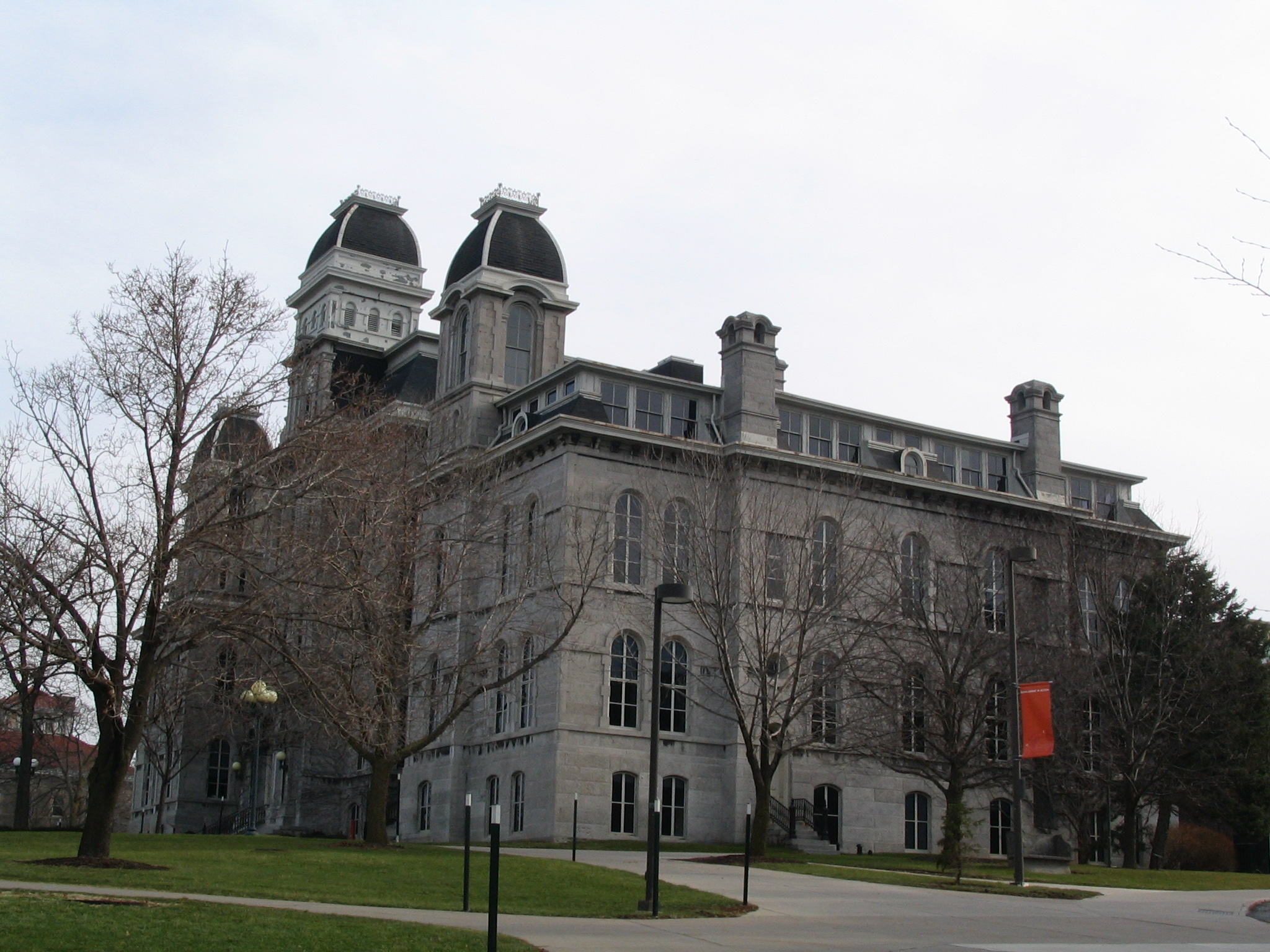
Side View

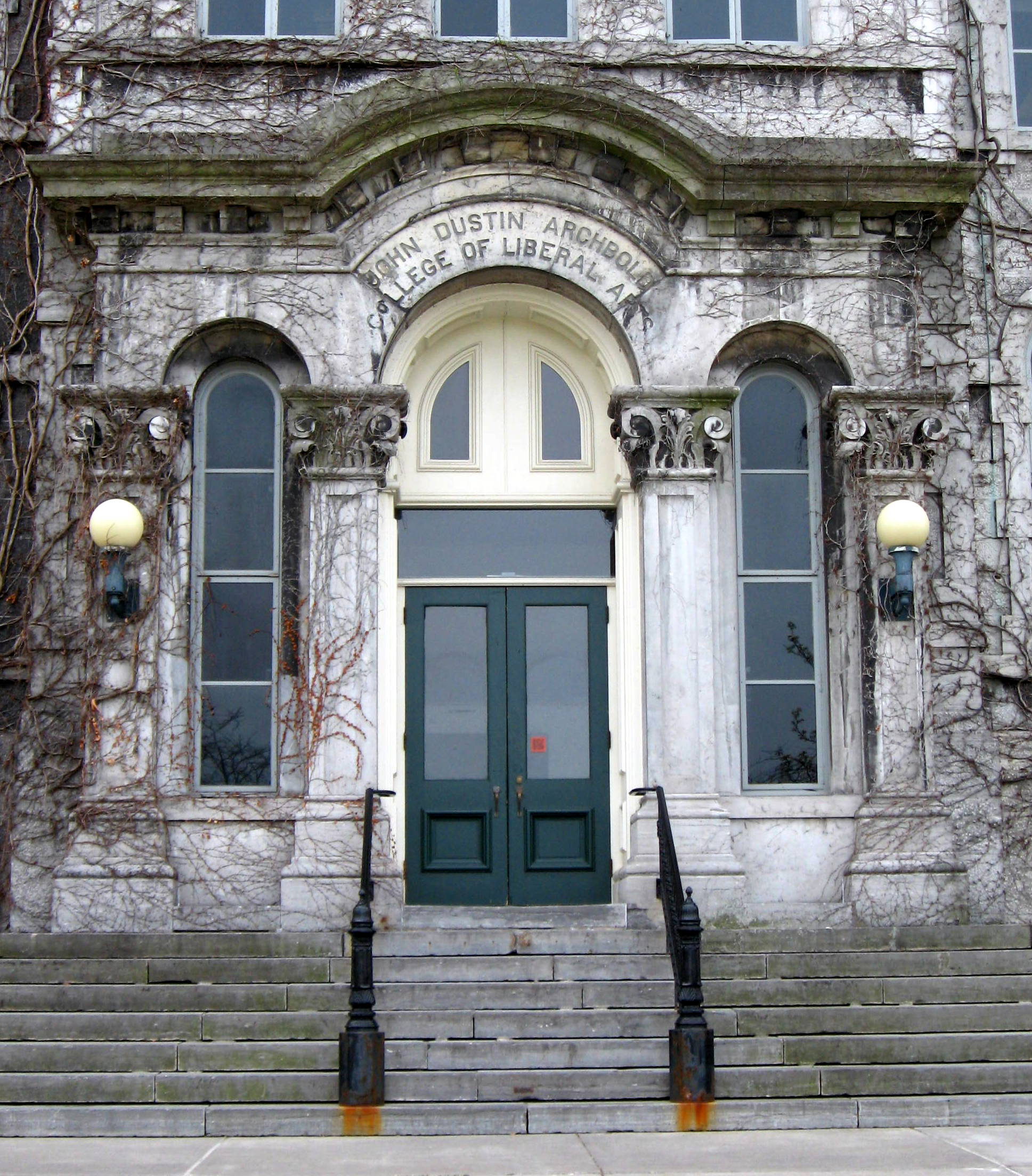
Main Entrance

== See also ==
- Archbold Gymnasium
- Comstock Tract Buildings
- Hendricks Chapel
- Steele Hall
- List of Registered Historic Places in Onondaga County, New York
- Facadism
- John Dustin Archbold
