= Henry J. Sedgwick =

American politician (1812–1868)

Henry Sedgwick

Member of the New York State Senate from the 7th district
- In office 1845–1847
- Preceded by: Elijah Rhoades
- Succeeded by: District eliminated

Personal details
- Born: Henry James Sedgwick; June 5, 1812 Ithaca, New York, U.S.
- Died: June 14, 1868 (aged 56)
- Resting place: Oakwood Cemetery
- Spouses: Lucinda Snow (m. 1834; died 1851) Lucy Hubbard (m. 1856)
- Relations: Charles B. Sedgwick; Daniel Gott (stepfather)
- Children: 3

Henry James Sedgwick (June 5, 1812 – June 14, 1868) was an American lawyer and politician who served as a member of the New York State Senate for the 7th district from 1845 to 1847.

== Early life and education ==
He was the son of Stephen Sedgwick (1783–1830), a lawyer who practiced for a short time in Ithaca, and Anna (Baldwin) Sedgwick (1786–1872). They divorced in 1818, and Anna married Daniel Gott (1794–1864), who was a Congressman from 1847 to 1851.

== Career ==
Sedgwick was a member of the New York State Senate for the 7th district from 1845 to 1847, sitting in the 68th, 69th and 70th New York State Legislatures. He later served as the postmaster of Syracuse, New York.

== Personal life ==
In 1834, Henry J. Sedgwick married Lucinda Snow (d. 1855), and they had three children. In March 1856, he married Lucy Hubbard. Congressman Charles B. Sedgwick (1815–1883) was his brother. He was buried at the Oakwood Cemetery

== Sources ==
- The New York Civil List compiled by Franklin Benjamin Hough (pages 135f and 145; Weed, Parsons and Co., 1858)
- Post Office Directory (1857; pg. 117)
- Hyde Genealogy by Reuben H. Walworth (1863; pg. 339f)
