= Gere Bank Building =

Historic commercial building in New York, United States

- U.S. National Register of Historic Places
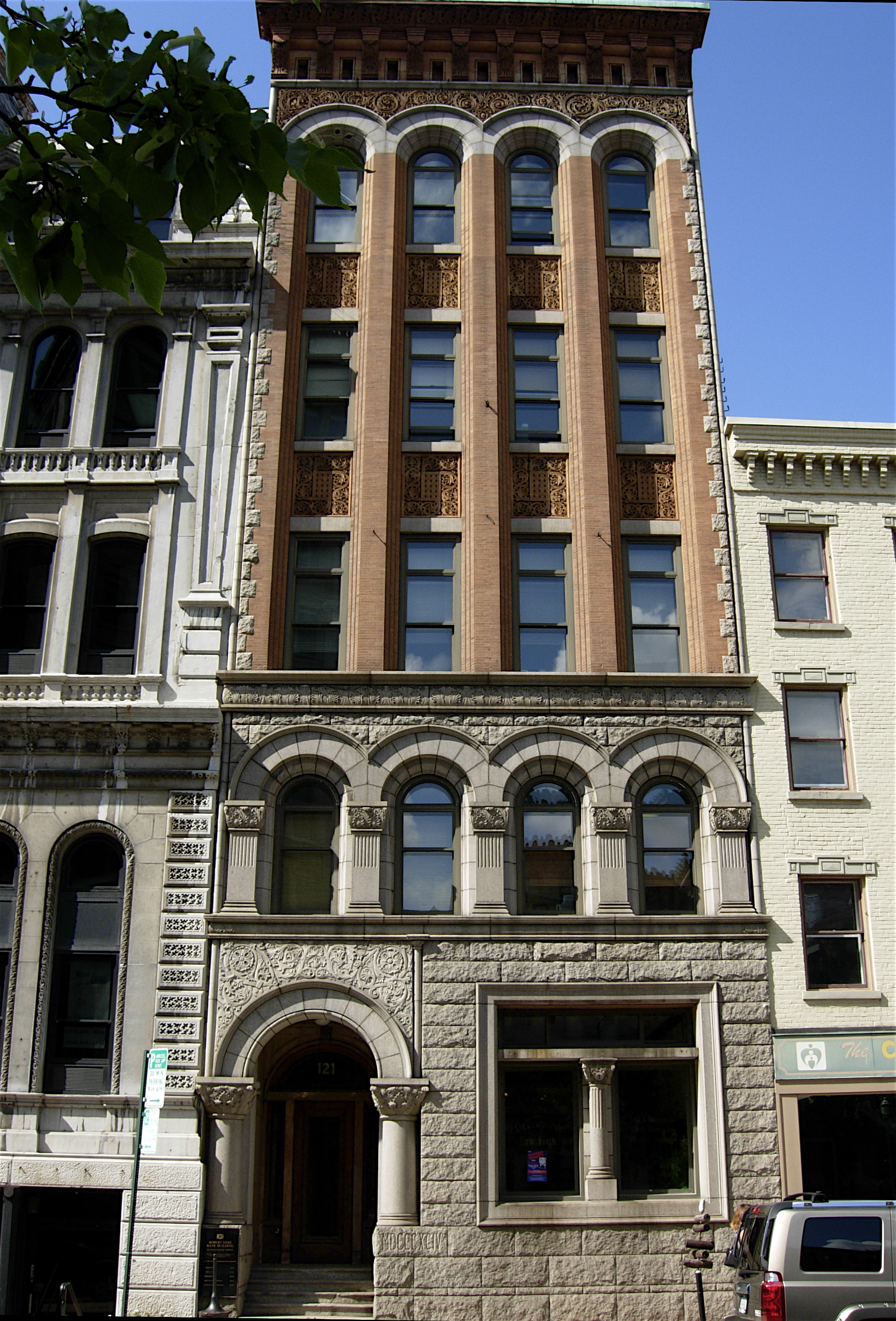

- Location within New York Location within the United States
- Location: 121 E. Water St., Syracuse, New York
- Coordinates: 43°3′2.55″N 76°9′5.43″W
- Built: 1894
- Architect: Charles E. Colton, Leamy Brothers Construction Co.
- NRHP reference No.: 72000894
- Added to NRHP: March 16, 1972

The Gere Bank Building is a five-story building located on Water Street in Syracuse, New York. It was designed by Charles Colton, and built in 1894. It is distinctive for its facade and use of contrasting materials. The cost of the building was $150,000, including nearly $50,000 for fireproof vaults in a room beneath the sidewalk. The building was added to the National Register of Historic Places in 1972. It is part of the Hanover Square Historic District. In the warm weather months, entertainment is common on the plaza around the fountain. Workers in the surrounding office buildings and retail establishments often lunch there.
