= Horatio Nelson White =

American architect (1814–1892)

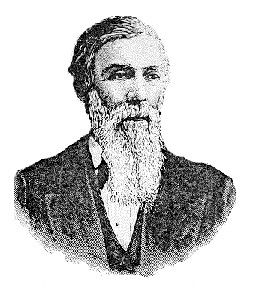
- Born: February 8, 1814; Middleton, New Hampshire, US
- Died: July 29, 1892 (aged 78); Syracuse, New York, US
- Occupation: Architect
- Buildings: Hall of Languages, Syracuse University, Gridley Building, Grace Episcopal Church

Horatio Nelson White (February 8, 1814 – July 29, 1892) was an American architect based out of Syracuse, New York, and became one of New York State's most prominent architects from about 1865 to 1880. White designed many homes, armories, churches, and public buildings throughout Syracuse in Central New York, including the Hall of Languages at Syracuse University, the Oswego County Court House, Syracuse High School, the Weiting Block in Syracuse, Oswego's City Hall, and more.

== Early life ==
White was born in Middleton, New Hampshire, on February 8, 1814, and was named after Horatio Nelson, the famous British admiral and hero of the Battle of Trafalgar. Before moving to Syracuse in 1843, White worked as a carpenter and a builder in Andover, Massachusetts. Upon arrival in Syracuse, White immediately made a name for himself, earning high praises as the building contractor for the Church of the Messiah. Following business reversals, White moved briefly to Brooklyn, New York, in 1847. In 1849, he set sail for San Francisco and worked in California during the 1849–1851 building boom and gold rush.

== Career ==
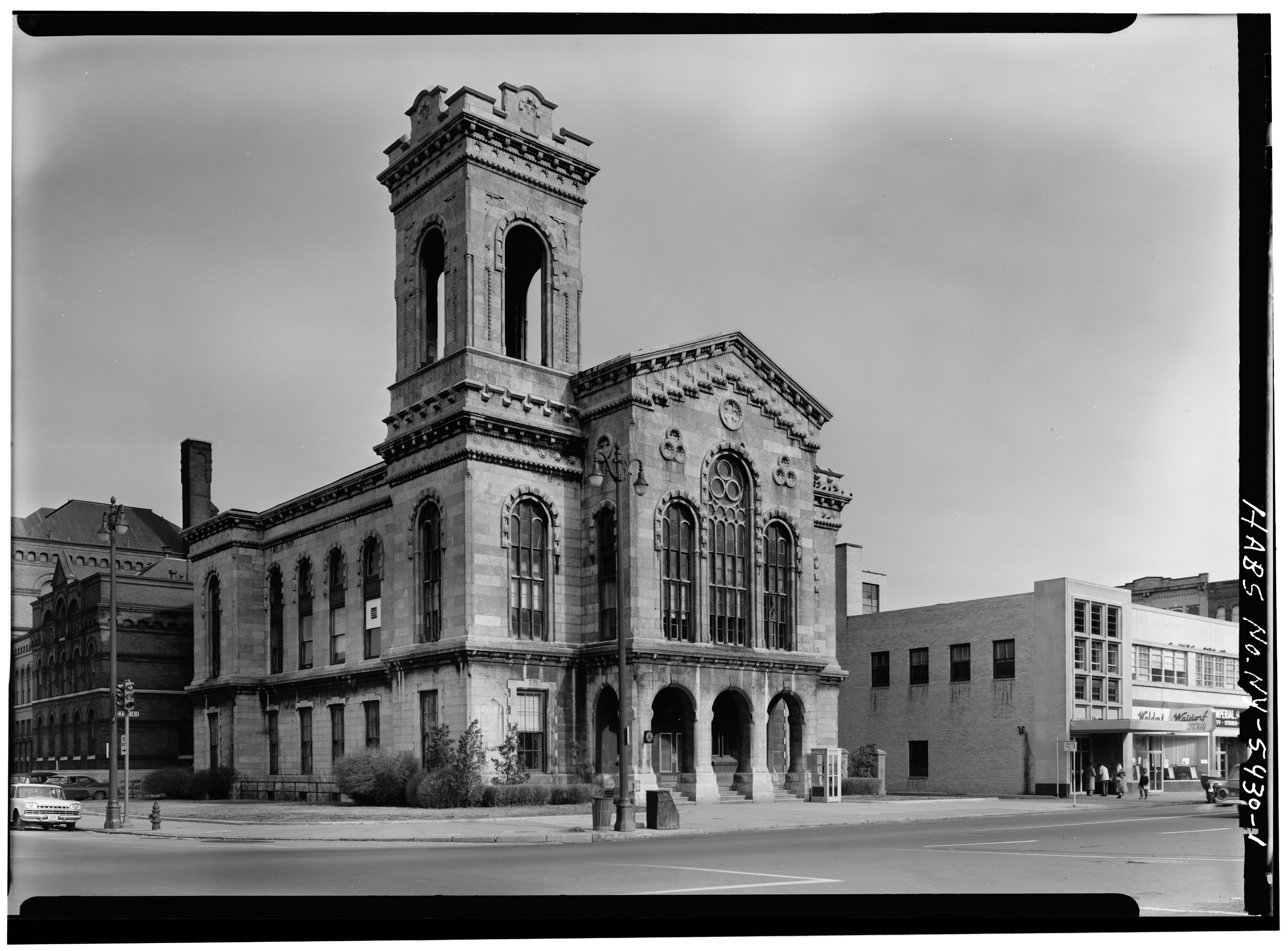
The Third Onondaga County Courthouse, Syracuse. Completed 1857, demolished 1967

In 1851, White returned to his wife and daughter in Syracuse, paid off his creditors and established what became a highly successful architectural practice. In 1856, White was given the prestigious opportunity of designing the new Onondaga County Courthouse in Clinton Square. The resulting design was hailed as a resounding success and elements from it were utilized in several of his subsequent plans, including the designs for the Jefferson and Chemung County courthouses. White's reputation was growing as one of the best architects in Syracuse. Young architects came to Syracuse to study under him. One of these was Archimedes Russell, later to become a professor of architecture at Syracuse University from 1873 through 1881.

In 1867, White designed the original Onondaga Savings Bank (now the Gridley Building). White adapted this style to the Hall of Languages, the first building constructed on the campus of Syracuse University. White was engaged to design New York State armories in Syracuse, Dunkirk and Ballston Spa. He also designed Plymouth Congregational Church in Syracuse. White prepared designs for over 100 churches.

While White designed many houses, his papers have been lost, therefore, the identity and attribution of most of them has been obscured. Accordingly, he is remembered mostly for his more monumental work. White's reputation remains to this day as one of the most distinguished architects to have been associated with Syracuse. White died in his home in 1892. His obituary referred to him as simply "the Venerable Architect".

== Notable buildings ==
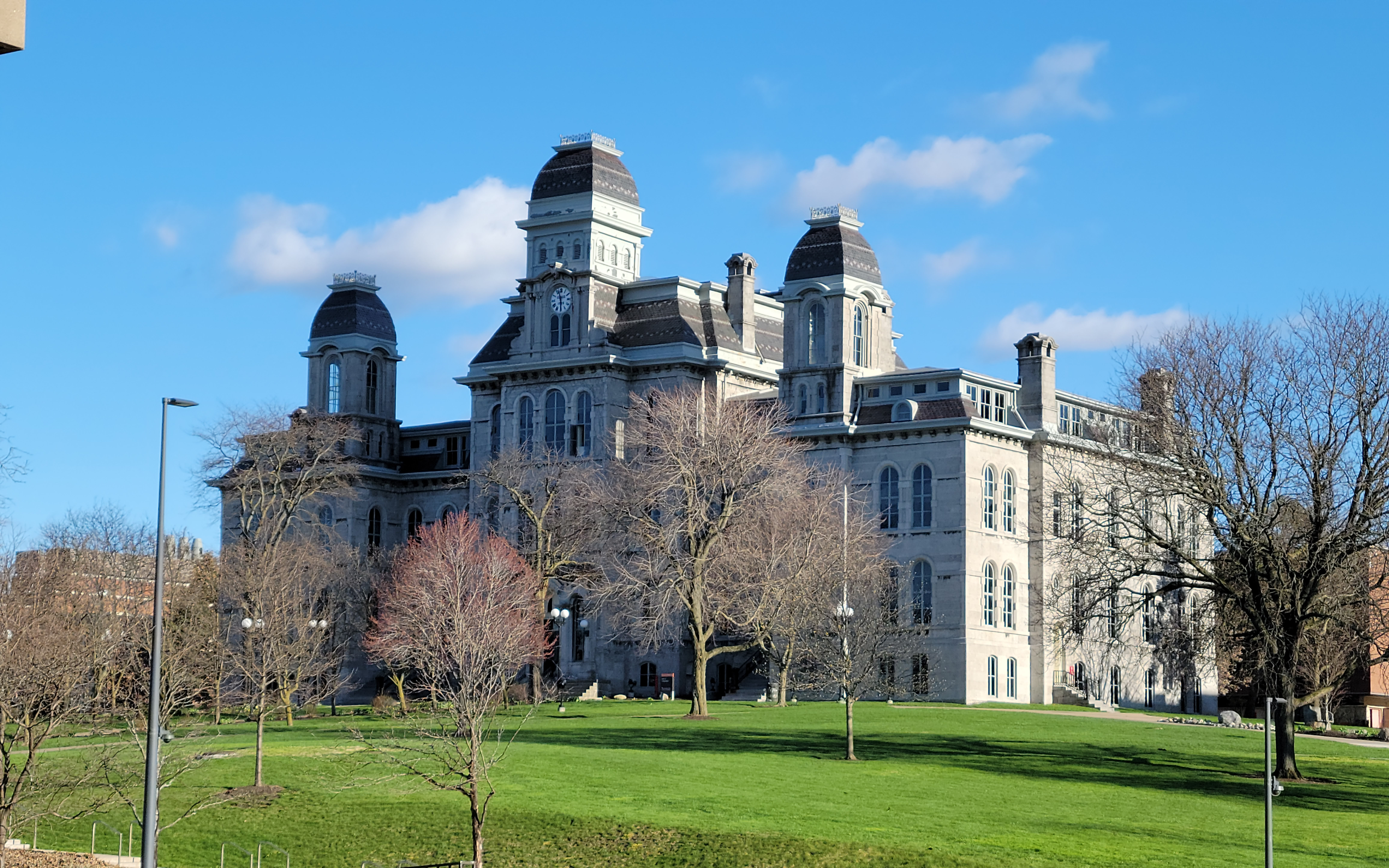
Hall of Languages, Syracuse University

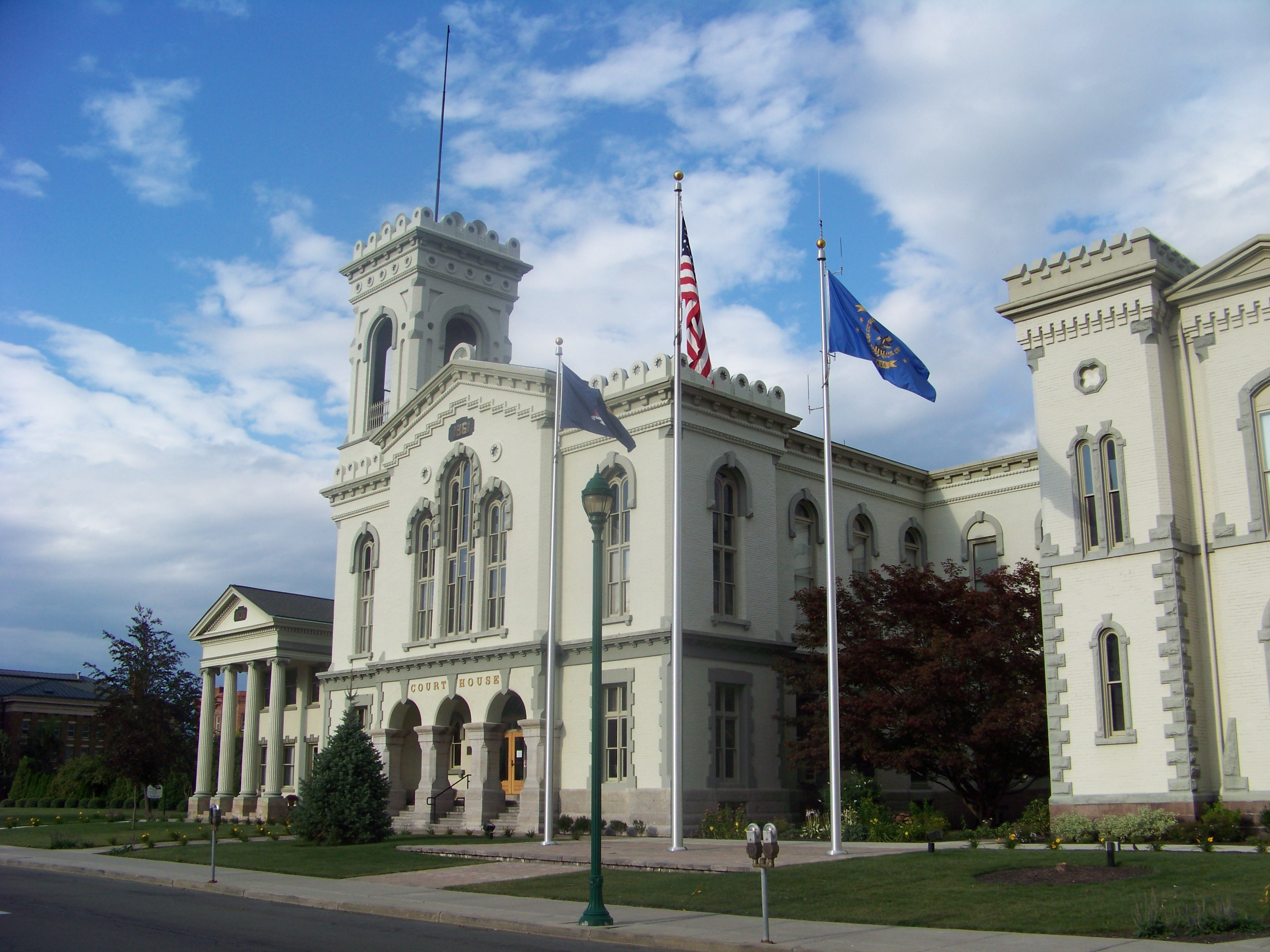
Chemung County Courthouse Complex

Extant buildings which he designed and which are listed on the National Register of Historic Places include:

- Syracuse
  - Hall of Languages, Syracuse University
  - Grace Episcopal Church
  - Gridley Building
- Oswego County Courthouse
- Chemung County Courthouse Complex, and the Park Church, both in Elmira, NY
- Jefferson County Courthouse Complex
- Oswego City Hall
- Webster Wagner House

== See also ==
- Archimedes Russell
- Ward Wellington Ward
