= Onondaga County Courthouse =

Onondaga County courthouse
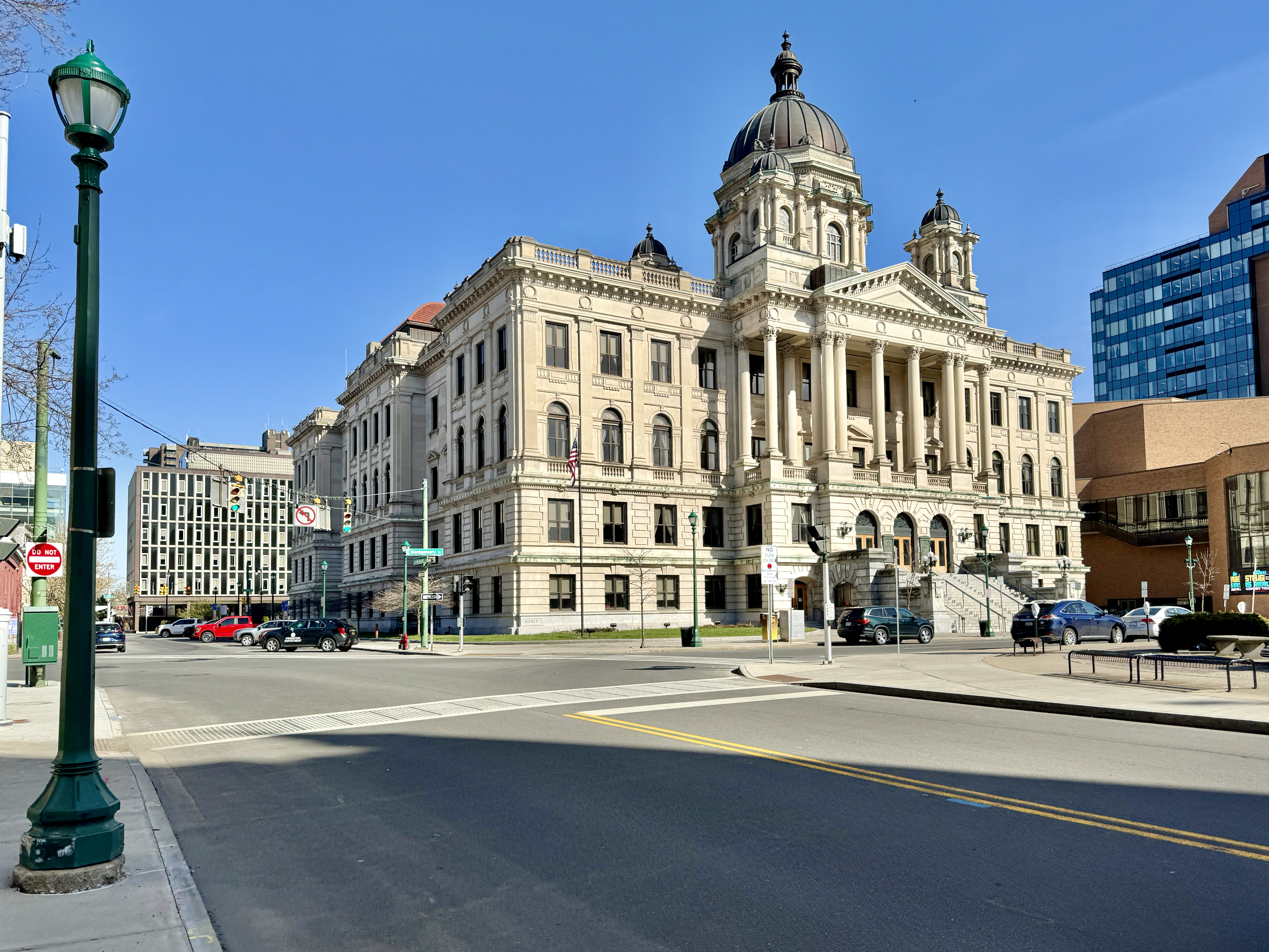
- The courthouse in 2024
- Interactive map of the Onondaga County courthouse area

General information
- Architectural style: Beaux-Arts
- Location: 401 Montgomery Street, Syracuse, New York, United States
- Construction started: 1904
- Completed: 1907
- Cost: ~US$1,400,000

Technical details
- Floor count: 5

Design and construction
- Architect: Archimedes Russell
- Fourth Onondaga County Courthouse
- U.S. Historic district – Contributing property
- Coordinates: 43°2′47″N 76°8′53″W
- Part of: Montgomery Street–Columbus Circle Historic District (ID80004278)
- Added to NRHP: February 2, 1980

The Onondaga County courthouse is a Beaux-Arts building in Syracuse, New York, which has served the county since its opening in 1907. The courthouse is located on Columbus Circle.

The building, Onondaga County's fourth courthouse, was designed by Archimedes Russell to replace the existing courthouse on Clinton Square. It has been cleaned and renovated several times. In 1915, the courthouse hosted the Barnes vs. Roosevelt libel trial. It was listed on the US National Register of Historic Places as part of the Montgomery Street–Columbus Circle Historic District in 1980.

== Design ==
=== Exterior ===
The courthouse occupies a block on Columbus Circle in Syracuse, New York. In its center is a lightwell.

The courthouse is designed in the Beaux-Arts style. The exterior has a rusticated granite base, with Indiana limestone above it. The front elevation (facing Columbus Circle) has a central pediment supported by columns, which turn into voussoirs at the second floor, where they are met by a steep staircase. The first, second, and fourth floors have rectangular windows, while the windows on the front of the third floor are arched. Pilasters run from the top of the second floor to the top of the fourth. Atop the courthouse is a large copper dome, surrounded by four smaller ones.

=== Interior ===
Thes courthouse has five floors. The county family court is on the first. The second is primarily used for the offices of the county clerk and record storage. State unified courts and a ceremonial courtroom occupy the fourth floor, while the fifth holds a law library. Each floor has a corridor that runs around the lightwell.

The interior features ornate plasterwork, marble floors and panels. The walls also have several murals painted by William de Leftwich Dodge and Gustave Gutgemon. Dodge painted four murals in the building's atrium, while Gutgemon contributed three to the third floor.

== History ==
=== Predecessors ===
From the early 19th century to the turn of the 20th, Onondaga County, New York, had three courthouse buildings built. The first, in Onondaga Hill, was used until 1830, when it was replaced by a courthouse between the towns of Salina and Syracuse. The third Onondaga County courthouse was constructed on Clinton Square from 1856 to 1857.

By the late 1800s, the Clinton Square courthouse was in poor condition and had proven too small for the growing county, necessitating a replacement. In 1899, the Onondaga County board of supervisors voted to construct a new courthouse, and efforts soon began to find a suitable location. Two years later, the county determined that the new courthouse would also be built on Clinton Square, just north of the building it was set to replace. Some owners of land on the desired plot proved unwilling to sell their land to the county, necessitating a change of plans.

=== Construction and opening ===
A block of land on Montgomery Street at Columbus Circle was selected as the new site for the courthouse in June 1902. Archimedes Russell was selected that year later to be the architect. Russell was aided by Melvin King, who was working as his drafter. The courthouse's building committee, including Russell, traveled to several cities around the Eastern United States before beginning construction. They particularly liked the Rhode Island State House building.

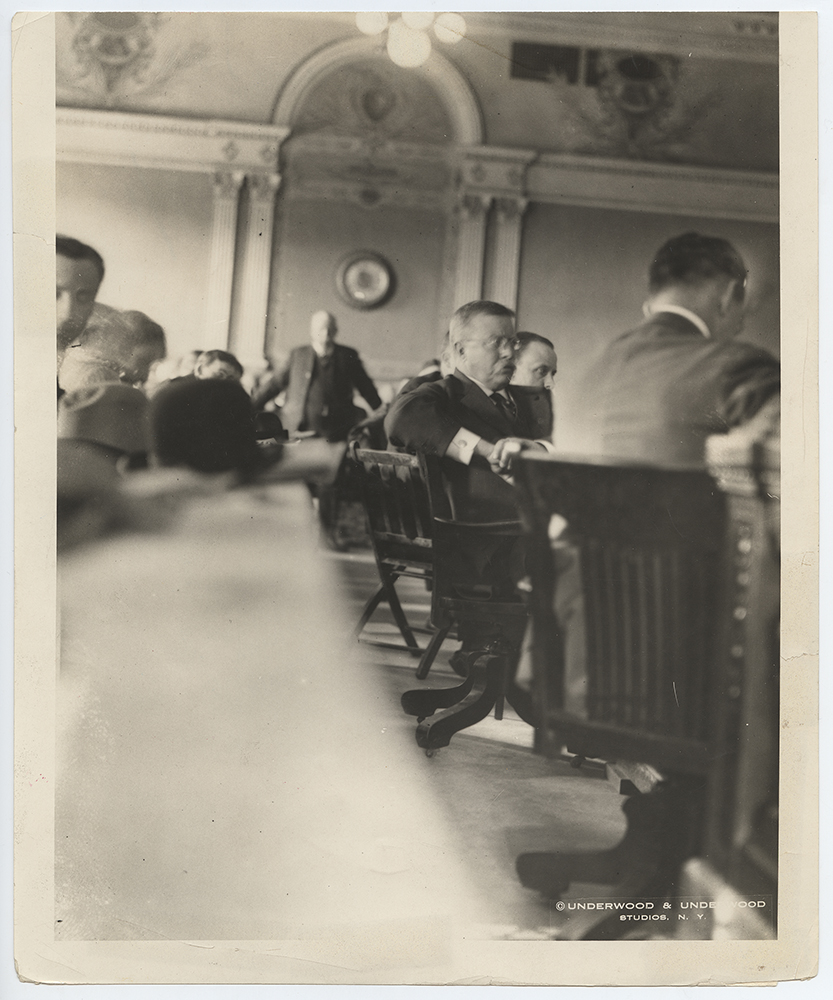
Theodore Roosevelt in the Onondaga County Courthouse

Four or five buildings had to be demolished before construction could begin. The cornerstone was laid on June 30, 1904, and after around 18 months the building was complete, at a cost of $1.4-1.5 million. Builders opted to use Indiana limestone on the outside instead of marble because limestone was less expensive to work with. The building included cutting-edge technology like steam heat and hydraulic elevators. As part of the project a standalone powerhouse and jail, the latter of which was connected to the courthouse by a tunnel, were built nearby. Both have since been demolished. The courthouse itself officially opened on January 1, 1907.

=== Later history ===
The courthouse hosted a libel trial between Theodore Roosevelt and William Barnes Jr. in 1915.

Since its opening, the courthouse has occasionally been cleaned and restored. In 1959 the exterior was cleaned with sandblasting. By the early 2000s, Dick Case reported in The Post-Standard, about 40% of the interior had seen restoration work. In 2006, to celebrate the courthouse's upcoming 100th anniversary, Onondaga County approved $7.5 million in exterior renovations. This work including roof repairs, restoration of the copper domes, and cleaning the exterior walls.

The building was listed on the US National Register of Historic Places as part of the Montgomery Street–Columbus Circle Historic District in 1980.

== See also ==
- List of tallest buildings in Syracuse, New York

== Bibliography ==
- Clayton, W Woodford (1878). ... History of Onondaga County, New York. Syracuse, N.Y. : D. Mason & Co.
- Hardin, Evamaria (1993-01-01). Syracuse Landmarks: An AIA Guide to Downtown and Historic Neighborhoods. Syracuse University Press. p. 94. ISBN 978-0-8156-0273-6.
- Hardin, Evamaria (1988). "Courthouse". Syracuse Scholar. 9 (2).
- Shaw, Diane (2020). City Building on the Eastern Frontier: Sorting the New Nineteenth-Century City. JHU Press. ISBN 978-1-4214-2931-1.
- New York State Council on the Arts (1964). Architecture Worth Saving in Onondaga County. Syracuse University School of Architecture. pp. 191–200.
