= Architecture Worth Saving in Onondaga County =

1964 book

- Language: English
- Genre: Architecture Critique
- Publisher: New York State Council on the Arts
- Publication date: 1964
- Publication place: United States

Architecture Worth Saving in Onondaga County is a 1964 book that surveyed buildings across Onondaga County, New York, and discussed their historical value. Undertaken by the New York State Council on the Arts, and compiled by a group of professors at the Syracuse University School of Architecture, the book was initially well received by historians and architects who hoped the book would be the first of several profiling buildings with historic and architectural value around the United States. However, the book was out of print by 1975, and many of the buildings listed had been destroyed.

== Writing and publication ==
The New York State Council on the Arts developed Architecture Worth Saving in Onondaga County in the early 1960s. It was created as a "pilot project", and the Council intended that similar studies would be conducted in other places. William Hull, assistant director of the council, started the project, while the Syracuse University School of Architecture led by Harley J. McKee carried it out. Other architects at the school involved in writing the book were Patricia Day Earle, Paul Malo, and Peter Andrews. A forward was written by John H. MacFayden. Most of the photographs included were taken by Gilbert Ask.

== Content ==
The book includes descriptions of 64 buildings across 206 pages. They considered buildings for their "architectural merit, unisequences of style, representation of period and historical value," with a focus on commercial buildings in the downtown area, which were considered to be at the greatest risk for destruction. Architecture Worth Saving also offered suggestions on how to save the architecture, including ways to re-purpose old buildings. Buildings listed included:

- John Gridley House
- Gen. Orrin Hutchinson House
- Dr. John Ives House
- Delphi Baptist Church
- Small Jewett House
- Whig Hill
- Roosevelt Hall
- Weighlock Building
- John Monro House
- Syracuse State School
- Gridley Building
- Syracuse Savings Bank Building
- White Memorial Building
- Gere Bank Building
- Dan Bradley House
- John McViccar House
- Harvey Tolman House
- Junod House
- First Presbyterian Church of Marcellus
- Reuel E. Smith House
- Church of St. John the Evangelist (Syracuse, New York)
- St. John the Baptist Greek Catholic Church
- McCarthy Warehouse
- Grace Episcopal Church
- First Baptist Church of Camillus
- St. Mark's Episcopal Church
- St. Paul's Episcopal Church
- Crouse College
- Alexander Brown House
- Martisco station
- Onondaga County Poor House
- Community Place
- Hamilton White House
- Wesleyan Methodist Church
- Hall of Languages
- Lucius Gleason House
- Third Onondaga County Courthouse

== Reception ==
A review published in New York History praised the book as a "worthy volume" that would hopefully be the first of several surveys creating "unique collections" of commentary and images on New York's historic architecture. Upon publication, an article in The New York Times wrote that after sending out information on the report to various officials and programs, "[t]he response in replies ha[d] far exceeded the council's expectations." Ada Louise Huxtable considered the work a "significant pilot report" and described it as a "remarkably competent survey of buildings of architectural value and historical importance." Huxtable also hoped that the book would be the first of a series of several such projects in other American cities.

A 1975 article in Pioneer America by Peirce F. Lewis argued that "the historic preservation movement in the United States has been, and continues to be, a thundering failure." He noted that the book had gone out of print, "perhaps because it has become obsolete— so many of the 'worth saving' buildings have been destroyed since the book was published, less than a dozen years ago." In a 1976 article Clifford E. Clark cited the book as one of the best studies of American domestic architecture.
