= Third Onondaga County courthouse =

Former courthouse in Syracuse, New York

Coordinates: 43°03′06″N 76°09′12″W

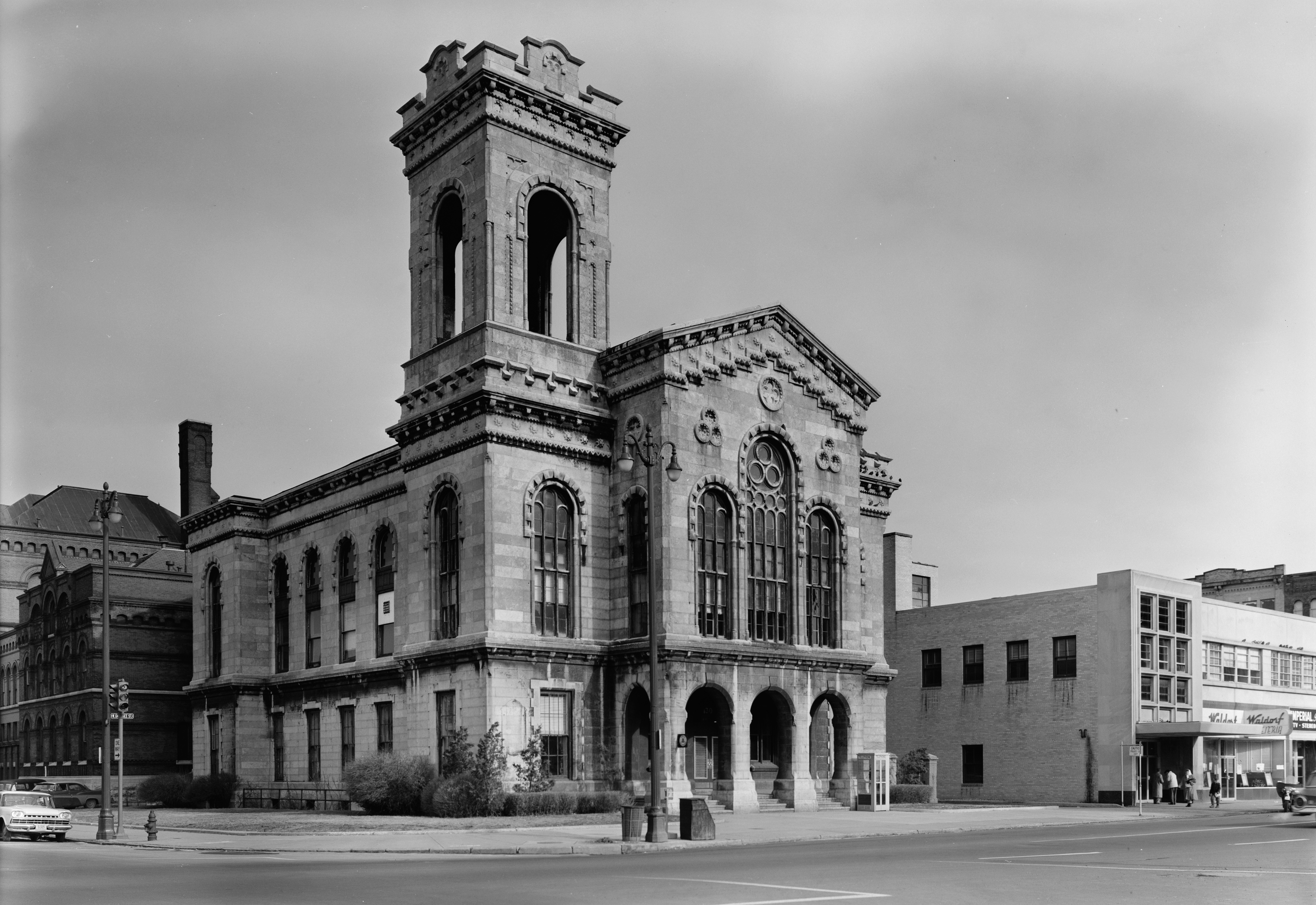
The courthouse pictured in the early 1960s.

The third Onondaga County courthouse stood in Clinton Square, Syracuse, New York, from 1858 to 1968. Designed by Horatio Nelson White in the Italianate architectural style, the building functioned as a courthouse until 1907. After another courthouse superseded it, the building held government offices for about fifty years.

The Onondaga County court was moved from its initial building in the town of Onondaga Hill to a courthouse between Salina and Syracuse in the first half of the 19th century. After the second courthouse burnt down in 1856, White, at the time the best-known Syracuse architect, was hired to design a new building, this time located in downtown Syracuse. The courthouse was made from hand-cut Onondaga Limestone and dedicated in early 1858. Despite renovations into the 1870s, by the turn of the century the building was run-down and a new courthouse was built to replace it. After the court was relocated in 1907, the building held the Syracuse Board of Education until 1945, and several other organizations including the Syracuse Police Department into the 1960s.

By the 1960s, the building was largely unoccupied and at threat of demolition. Despite proposals to repurpose the building in various ways, including one in the book Architecture Worth Saving in Onondaga County, it was demolished in 1968. The stones that made up the top 36 or 37 feet (11 or 11 m) of the courthouse's 80 feet (24 m) tall tower were preserved and as of 2022 are held unassembled at the Syracuse Hancock International Airport.

== Description ==
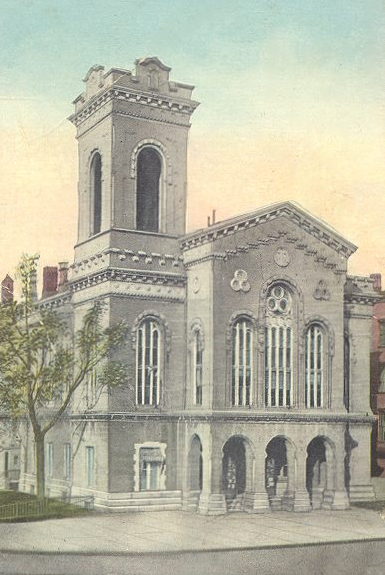
A depiction of the courthouse in 1900.

The main courthouse was 60 by 100 feet (18 by 30 m). A tower was attached to the left side that was 80 feet (24 m) tall. Architectural historian Diane Shaw describes the building as "picturesque", noting that it had "asymmetrical massing and detached form," comparing its look to that of a church and highlighting how it stood in contrast to the "boxy" buildings around it." The building was designed in the Italianate style. Masonry on the outside of the building was in what at the time was deemed the "Anglo-Norman style". Architecture scholar Evamaria Hardin described this as Romanesque, writing that "there was a certain grandeur in the simplicity" of the courthouse. Front windows were constructed evocative of the Palladian style.

The first floor had offices and jury rooms off of a central corridor. The second floor also contained offices, a library, and a room for the judges, but was primary taken up by a 52 by 72 feet (16 by 22 m) main courtroom. After 1906, the main courtroom was subdivided into two floors and a number of offices. The windows were modified to supply light to both floors, but the architectural guide Architecture Worth Saving in Onondaga County wrote in 1964 that the third floor looked like an attic and did not have sufficient windows. As a result it was unused by the 1960s. The guide also noted that by the time of its publication little evidence remained of what the building's interior originally looked like.

A 1964 map showing the location of the courthouse, and plans aimed at replicating the original layout.

== History ==
=== Earlier courthouses ===
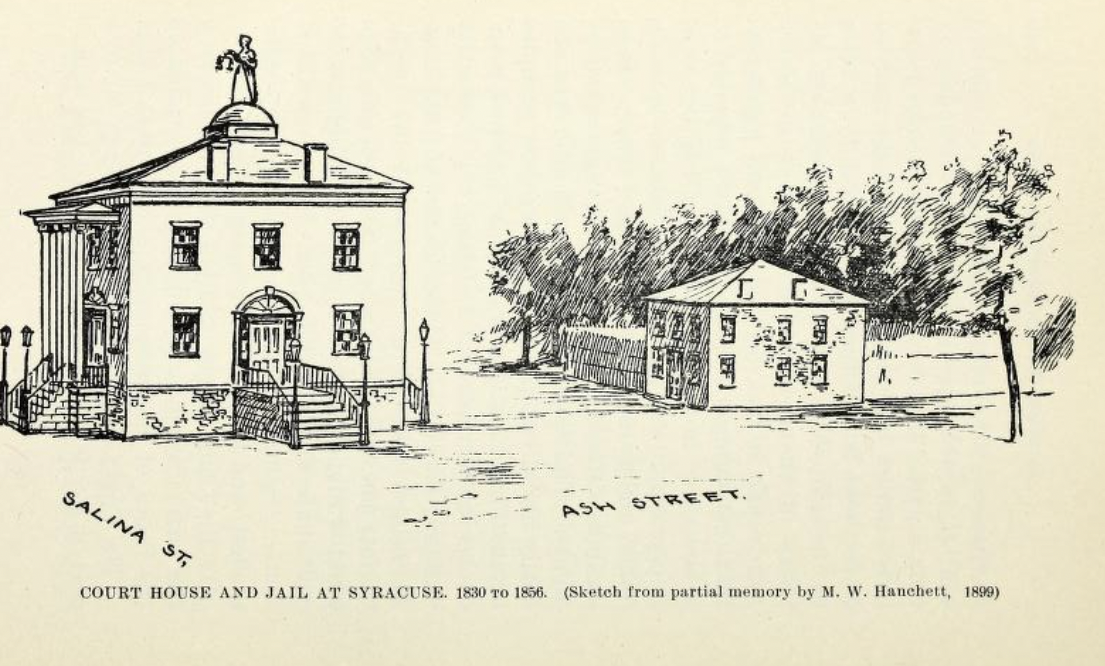
The second courthouse as drawn in 1899

The Onondaga County seat, and the county court with it, was in several different locations across the county in the end of the 18th and throughout the 19th century. Cities and towns competed for the influence holding the seat brought with it. The county seat was first in Onondaga Hollow, from 1794 to 1801, before it was moved to Onondaga Hill. In Onondaga Hill, the first formal building for the Onondaga County court was constructed. It was 50 square feet (4.6 m^{2}) and two stories, with the first floor occupied by the county jail.

In 1830, as the economic center of the county changed with the growth of a salt industry, the court was moved to a new building between the towns of Salina, where the most salt was produced, and Syracuse, where it was shipped out. This building was only slightly larger than the first, had a jail on the first floor, and a courtroom on the second. Both villages continued to advocate for relocation of the courthouse into their borders, as they saw the prosperity that had left Onondaga Hill with the county seat. Tensions between Syracuse and Salina continued until the towns were merged in 1848 with the formation of the city of Syracuse. In 1856, the existing courthouse was destroyed by arson, and work began deciding where to build a new one.

=== Construction and use ===
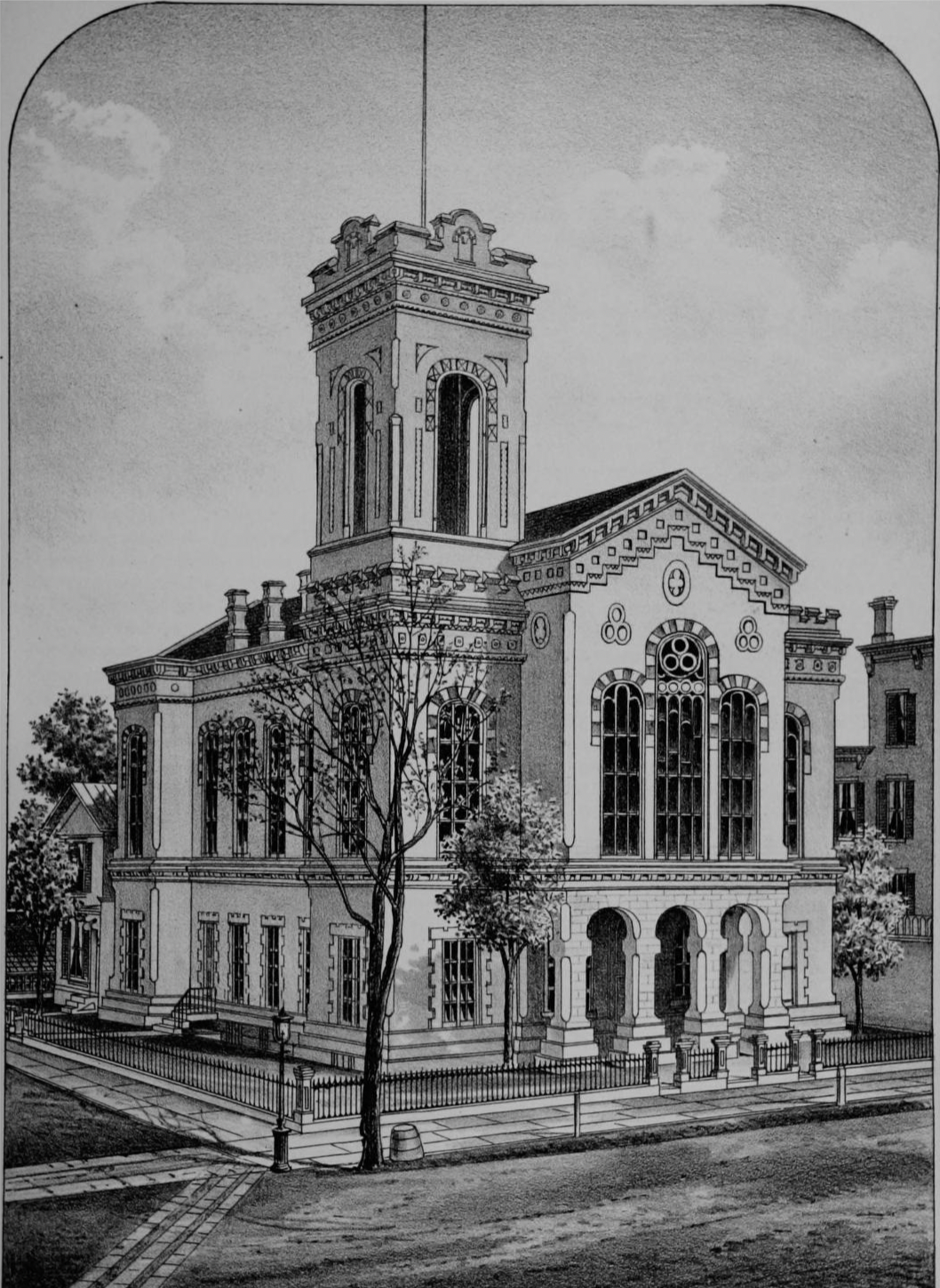
The courthouse as drawn in 1878

After discussion, the county decided to place the courthouse near a commercial district. The county purchased a lot on Clinton Square from James L. Voorhees, which had previously been the site of a hotel. Vorhees received the lot previously occupied by the burnt-down courthouse in exchange. He also continued to own properties surrounding the courthouse, including a hotel, and sought to profit from business originating with the courthouse. Clinton Square had the benefit of being centrally located in Syracuse and in the vicinity of the county clerk's office. The county estimated that the courthouse would cost $38,000 to build.

The third Onondaga County Courthouse was designed by Horatio Nelson White, at the time the best-known Syracuse architect. Nelson was influenced by a recent remodel of the nearby Rochester's Monroe County Courthouse from the Federal style. His Italianate style design has been described as standing "in striking contrast to the designs used generally in courthouses." White later used a similar design for his work on courthouses in Watertown, New York, and Elmira, New York.

The committee tasked with selecting a design recommended against substituting "cheapness for durability and adaptation" in construction. Front and side courthouse walls were constructed of hand-cut Onondaga Limestone, while the roof and floors were made out of wood, and the back wall of brick. It was built from 1856 to 1857 and formally dedicated on February 8, 1858. The final cost was around $40,000.

Steam heat was added in the 1870s. By the 1880s a Court of Appeals building and separate new office for the county clerk had been built near the courthouse. By then, the courthouse had started to attract some criticism as "dark and dingy [and]... difficult to keep clean". An 1882 newspaper suggested solving problems with ventilation through "a dynamite cartridge inserted in each corner and then exploded."

=== Replacement and later function ===
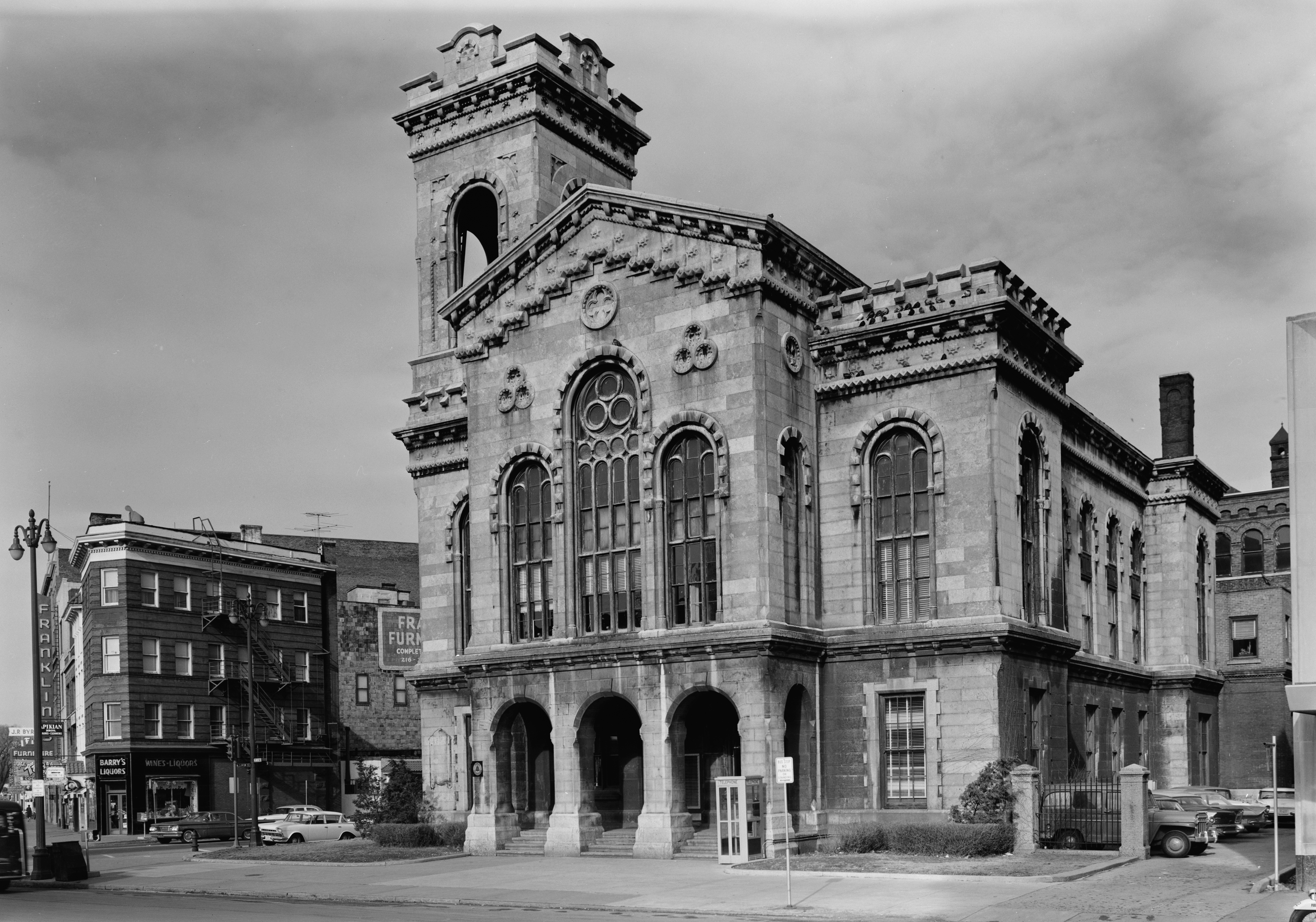
The courthouse pictured in the early 1960s.

The courthouse was set to be replaced by a larger building after an 1890 vote by the Onondaga County board of supervisors. The design and construction of the new building took several years, and by 1899 The Post-Standard reported that the "building must be abandoned" and was in "deplorable" condition. The newspaper published the report of a committee examining the need for a new courthouse, which wrote that the building had grown too small for Syracuse. It wrote further that the entrance was "dark and dingy; the halls and rooms are dirty;... the cells of the prisoners and cooking in the basement create offensive odors which permeate the whole building and are very obnoxious." The building was not properly ventilated, and the newspaper noted that several witnesses and a constable had fainted in the courthouse in the past year. Additionally, the library had grown so large that it cracked the walls of an annex.

In 1907 the building was replaced as Onondaga's courthouse by the fourth Onondaga County Courthouse on Columbus Circle, which had been constructed from 1904 to 1906. There were concerns that this shift would imperil the building by leaving it unused, but for over fifty years the former courthouse was used in various government capacities, including as the offices for the Syracuse Board of Education until 1945, then for a year as the headquarters of the Onondaga County War Price and Rationing Board. Later the Syracuse Police Department was headquartered in a building attached to the back of the courthouse, and the building hosted the traffic court. A profile of the building written in 1964 noted that the interior was substantially altered and the exterior had fallen into disrepair. However, the masonry remained in "good condition".

=== Threats of demolition ===
In the 1950s, suggestions were made to tear the building down and replace it with a parking lot. The Syracuse Police Department and the traffic court relocated in the 1960s, renewing discussion of tearing the courthouse down.

The courthouse was profiled in Architecture Worth Saving in Onondaga County, a 1964 book discussing the architectural and historical value of selected buildings in Onondaga County. In a review of the book, architecture critic Ada Louise Huxtable deemed the building "a landmark of high quality" and "a top example of its style." Architecture Worth Saving proposed repurposing and preserving the building, suggesting removing the third floor and office spaces, which would restore the courtroom to the hall it initially was. This room could be used as an auditorium seating 325-350 people. While the study noted that number was "not large", its authors felt that the architecture inside and outside could be "of imposing civic scale" and serve the community, hosting events such as "lectures, recitals, chamber music, political meetings and social events". It also suggested tearing down a police station that had been built on the back of the building to make a parking lot.

The guide urged that those proposing tearing down the courthouse recognize it as "irreplaceable" for its historic value, architecture, and masonry construction. If it could not be converted to a lecture hall, Architecture Worth Saving suggested several other options that would not involve demolition, including as a museum, as the offices of a public service organization, or (as a last resort) selling it to private interests with the requirement that the exterior be preserved.

In 1964, The Post-Standard wrote that Syracuse was seeking offers from private interests for the courthouse and that the building would likely be torn down if no other use was found for it within six months. Within the next two years, the adjoining police department building was sold to Ronao corporation for $11,000 and demolition had begun. Because this held the heating plant for both buildings, another system would need to be installed if the main building were to be preserved. Demolition of the rest of the courthouse did not happen immediately as efforts to find a use for it continued; in 1964 the Onondaga County Bar Association and the Technology Club of Syracuse announced that they were considering using the courthouse, and in January 1965 it was suggested as the headquarters of an urban renewal program. Later that year, the Crusade for Opportunity, a community action agency based in Syracuse, began to occupy the courthouse. In January 1966, a local architect credited Architecture Worth Saving and the attention it received with saving the courthouse from "practically certain destruction".

In early 1967, the Crusade for Opportunity left the courthouse as it had been slated for demolition. Demolition began in early February 1968, and was completed by the 22nd. In 1971 it was replaced by the Syracuse Newspapers Building, which held the offices and printing-press of The Post-Standard.

=== After demolition ===
The blocks which made up the top 36 or 37 feet (11.0 or 11.3 m) of the courthouse's tower were numbered and preserved when it was taken down, in anticipation of a possible re-construction. The preservation was funded by William Bianchi, the president of the company overseeing the demolition. Proposals for reconstruction were advanced as early as 1970 by the Society for the Advancement of Visual Environment (SAVE), which suggested five sites: Clinton Square, Onondaga Community College, the Everson Museum of Art, Fayette Park, and a spot off of Interstate 81 near Nedrow, New York.

Despite this, by 1978 the blocks were already in failing condition, with several broken, some vandalized with spray paint, and others sinking into the dirt they had been left on. They were held by the Syracuse Department of Parks and Recreation and left for about 30 years behind their headquarters. The bricks were shrink-wrapped at some point in an effort to further preserve them, but not before the numbers had worn away. In 1985 the Syracuse Herald-Journal published a story polling its readership on various suggestions for re-using the tower. The most readers voted for including the tower in a park in Clinton Square, but this did not happen. By this point any information about how the pieces had fit together was lost. In 2001, the city placed them in storage at Syracuse Hancock International Airport.

There have been several proposals to re-use the stones, including a suggestion in 2002 to use the stones in part of the Carousel Center mall, and one in 2007 to rebuild the tower as part of the construction of a transportation hub for Centro in the city. An article published in The Post-Standard in February 2007 wrote that the city was almost positive that the stones were at Hancock Airport, but would confirm once snow at the airport had cleared. In February 2022, David Haas, a Syracuse inhabitant who runs the Instagram account @syracusehistory, posted that the location of the stones was still unconfirmed. The following day, Haas posted that Ben Walsh, the mayor of Syracuse, had confirmed that the stones were still held at the Hancock Airport.

== Bibliography ==
- Clayton, W Woodford (1878). ... History of Onondaga County, New York. Syracuse, N.Y. : D. Mason & Co.
- Hardin, Evamaria (1988). "Courthouse". Syracuse Scholar. 9 (2).
- Hardin, Evamaria (1993). Syracuse Landmarks: An AIA Guide to Downtown and Historic Neighborhoods. Syracuse University Press. pp. 85–88, 96. ISBN 978-0-8156-2599-5.
- New York State Council on the Arts (1964). Architecture Worth Saving in Onondaga County. Syracuse University School of Architecture. pp. 191–200.
- Shaw, Diane (2020). City Building on the Eastern Frontier: Sorting the New Nineteenth-Century City. JHU Press. ISBN 978-1-4214-2931-1.
