= Columbus Circle (disambiguation) =

Columbus Circle is a traffic circle in New York City, US.

Columbus Circle may also refer to:

== New York City ==
- 59th Street–Columbus Circle station, a subway station complex under the circle consisting of
  - 59th Street – Columbus Circle (IRT Broadway – Seventh Avenue Line), serving the 1 and 2 trains
  - 59th Street – Columbus Circle (IND Eighth Avenue Line), serving the A, B, C, and D trains

== Other uses ==
- Columbus Circle (Syracuse, New York), a plaza and neighborhood in Syracuse, New York, US
- Columbus Circle (Washington, D.C.), a traffic circle in Washington D.C., US
- Columbus Circle (film), a 2012 film

== See also ==
- The Shops at Columbus Circle, a shopping mall in New York City
