= Marcellus (village), New York =

Village in New York, United States

Marcellus, New York
- Village
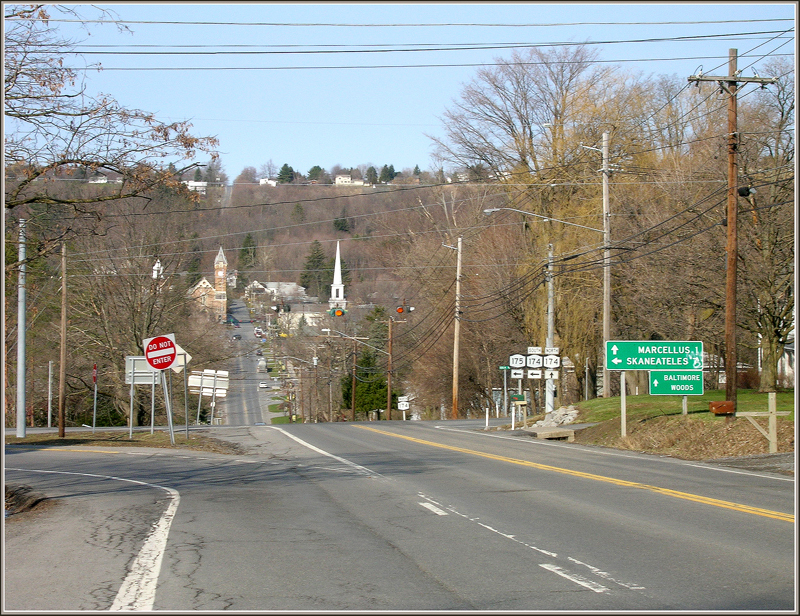
- Approaching Marcellus village on the historic Seneca Turnpike

- Location in Onondaga County and the state of New York.
- Coordinates: 42°58′56″N 76°20′24″W
- Country: United States
- State: New York
- County: Onondaga
- Town: Marcellus
- Incorporated: 1853

Government
  - Mayor: Chad A. Clark

Area
  - Total: 0.64 sq mi (1.66 km^{2})
  - Land: 0.64 sq mi (1.66 km^{2})
  - Water: 0 sq mi (0.00 km^{2})

Population (2020)
  - Total: 1,745
  - Density: 2,729.9/sq mi (1,054.01/km^{2})
- Postal code: 13108
- Area code: 315
- FIPS code: 36-45480
- Website: villageofmarcellusny.gov

Marcellus is a village in the town of Marcellus in Onondaga County, New York, United States. As of the 2020 census, the population was 1,745. The village is southwest of Syracuse and is in the southern part of the town of Marcellus.

== History ==
Settled in the late eighteenth century, the village was incorporated in 1853. Water power from Nine Mile Creek attracted mill development (wool, paper, and gunpowder) while the Seneca Turnpike (image above), passing through the village center, provided access.

The Dan Bradley House was listed on the National Register of Historic Places in 1978.

== Landmarks ==
The Village of Marcellus retains some of the finest architectural and historic landmarks in Central New York, such as the Dan Bradley House (59 South Street), one of the oldest and least-altered houses of the region. Ambitious for its early date, it retains fine detail in the Federal style, including original windows with old glass. The Dan Bradley House was possibly built in the late eighteenth century. The Caleb Gasper House (formerly the Marcellus Free Library, 4 Slocombe Street), c. 1811, retains an entrance likewise in the Federal Style. Two important Greek Revival mansions are the Curtis Moses House (36 South Street), c. 1838, and the Dr. Lake I. Tefft House (18 North Street), c. 1830. The First Presbyterian Church of Marcellus (East Main and North Streets), 1851, is a Greek-Revival landmark. Although clad in modern vinyl siding, it is otherwise little altered. The Hiram Reed House (31 North Street), 1853, is an example of a residence in the new Italianate style of the mid-nineteenth century, surrounded by park-like grounds. The Edward Talbot House (Masonic Lodge, 46 East Main Street), c. 1835, is an earlier brick building altered in the Italianate style. Original entry porch columns were removed in more recent times, but otherwise the building is an example of mid-nineteenth-century architecture.

== Geography ==
Marcellus is in a scenic region at 42°59′08″N 76°20′29″W (42.985572, -76.341378). Otisco Lake is to the south, Skaneateles Lake to the west, and Nine-Mile Creek, a trout stream, to the north. According to the United States Census Bureau, the village has a total area of 0.6 square mile (1.6 km^{2}), all land.

New York State Route 175, an east–west highway, intersects New York State Route 174 at Marcellus village.

== Notable people ==
- Nathan K. Hall, former US Congressman and Postmaster General
- Henry Van Aernam, former US Congressman
- Dan Beach Bradley, medical missionary to Siam

== Demographics ==
Historical population
Census	Pop.	Note	%±
1870	428		—
1880	489		14.3%
1890	563		15.1%
1900	589		4.6%
1910	917		55.7%
1920	989		7.9%
1930	1,083		9.5%
1940	1,112		2.7%
1950	1,382		24.3%
1960	1,697		22.8%
1970	2,017		18.9%
1980	1,870		−7.3%
1990	1,840		−1.6%
2000	1,826		−0.8%
2010	1,813		−0.7%
2020	1,745		−3.8%
U.S. Decennial Census

As of the census of 2000, there were 1,826 people, 785 households, and 474 families residing in the village. The population density was 2,955.2 inhabitants per square mile (1,141.0/km^{2}). There were 838 housing units at an average density of 1,356.2 per square mile (523.6/km^{2}). The racial makeup of the village was 98.25% White, 0.33% Black or African American, 0.49% Native American, 0.27% Asian, 0.05% from other races, and 0.60% from two or more races. Hispanic or Latino of any race were 0.99% of the population.

There were 785 households, out of which 30.6% had children under the age of 18 living with them, 45.6% were married couples living together, 11.8% had a female householder with no husband present, and 39.6% were non-families. 35.0% of all households were made up of individuals, and 14.4% had someone living alone who was 65 years of age or older. The average household size was 2.33 and the average family size was 3.07.

In the village, the population was spread out, with 27.0% under the age of 18, 7.6% from 18 to 24, 29.6% from 25 to 44, 19.8% from 45 to 64, and 16.0% who were 65 years of age or older. The median age was 37 years. For every 100 females, there were 87.9 males. For every 100 females age 18 and over, there were 83.4 males.

The median income for a household in the village was $42,115, and the median income for a family was $57,143. Males had a median income of $36,250 versus $27,197 for females. The per capita income for the village was $21,842. About 6.4% of families and 6.3% of the population were below the poverty line, including 9.1% of those under age 18 and 1.5% of those age 65 or over.

== Education ==
The village is in the Marcellus Central School District

== Works ==
- Syracuse-Onondaga County Planning Agency. Onondaga Landmarks. 1975.
- Harley McKee, Patricia Earle, Paul Malo. Architecture Worth Saving in Onondaga County. Syracuse University Press. 1964.
- Christopher T. Baer. "Turnpikes." Syracuse University Press. Encyclopedia of New York State. 2005
