= List of tallest buildings in Syracuse, New York =

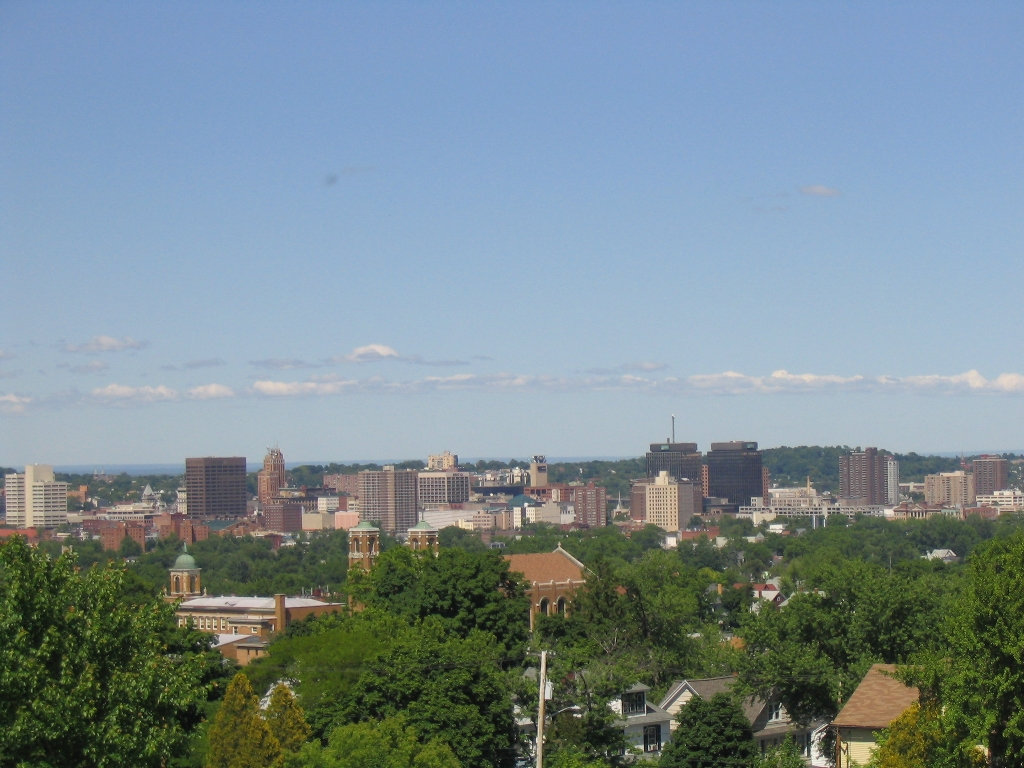
Syracuse city skyline

This list ranks buildings in the U.S. city of Syracuse, New York, by height.

Since its construction in 1927, the State Tower Building has been the tallest building in Syracuse. Bricks on the facade of the State Tower Building gradually get lighter towards the top of the Art Deco building; this was intended to make the building seem higher than it actually is. The building is listed on the National Register of Historic Places as a contributing property in the Hanover Square Historic District. It was renovated in 2003 and 2016.

St. Paul's Episcopal Cathedral, one of the top 10, was constructed in the 1800s. Eight tall buildings were constructed in the 1970s, and apparently demand for office space has not required new buildings since.

Rank	Name	Image	Height	Floors	Use	Built	Notes
1	State Tower Building		313 ft (95 m)	23	Office	1928	
2	Jefferson Tower	Upload image	279 ft (85 m)	23	Residential	1967	
3	Equitable Tower I		269 ft (82 m)	19	Commercial office	1966	Formerly known as AXA Towers
3	Equitable Tower II		269 ft (82 m)	19	Commercial office	1973	Formerly known as AXA Towers
4	Toomey Abbott Towers	Upload image	229 ft (70 m)	24	Senior living	1968	
5	Bernardine Tower	Upload image	228 ft (69 m)	23	Senior living/Apartment building	1973	
6	Chase Tower		225 ft (69 m)	18	Commercial office	1974	
7	Lawrinson Hall	Upload image	223 ft (68 m)	21	Dormitory	1965	Part of Syracuse University
8	Crowne Plaza	Upload image	249 ft (76 m)	22	Hotel	1970	
9	Clinton Plaza		213 ft (65 m)	23	Residential	1976	
10	St. Paul's Episcopal Cathedral		200 ft (61 m)		Church	1885	
11	Harrison House	Upload image	193 ft (59 m)	21	Residential	1974	
11	Townsend Towers	Upload image	193 ft (59 m)	21	Senior living	1972	
12	500 Building		187 ft (57 m)	12	Commercial office	1929	
12	Hills Building		187 ft (57 m)	13	Commercial office	1928	
13	Syracuse Savings Bank Building	Upload image	171 ft (52 m)	6	Commercial office	1876	Also known as Bank of America building
14	Onondaga County Courthouse		165 ft (50 m)	4	Courthouse / Government Office building	1907	
15	Syracuse City Hall		165 ft (50 m)	12	City Hall / Government Office building	1892	
16	One Park Place, Syracuse	Upload image	160 ft (49 m)	10	Commercial office	1974	

== Cancelled buildings ==
Proposed construction of the "Primex Building" never got past foundation work being done, in a project planned to be completed in 1964. It was to have a revolving restaurant, and, at 25 stories, would have been the tallest building in New York State outside of New York City.

On October 24, 2002, the groundbreaking for a 430-foot (130 m), 47-story Destiny USA Hotel to be named the Grand Destiny Hotel was held. On that date a steel beam was driven into the Carousel Center parking lot. Over the next three weeks, over 40 more pilings were driven, but by December 2 construction had stopped. In July 2008 construction had restarted, and by August three stories of steel framework had been erected.

OnCenter Convention Center Marriott Hotel was a planned 12- or 16-floor building, 58.28 metres (191.2 ft)] in 2004 and eventually cancelled.

In 2001 Clinton Square North Tower was a planned 16-floor, 74.49-metre (244.4 ft) complex built alongside Chase Tower and eventually cancelled.

== See also ==
- List of Syracuse University buildings
- List of tallest buildings in Upstate New York
- List of tallest buildings in Rochester, New York
- List of tallest buildings in Buffalo
- List of tallest buildings in Albany

== Bibliography ==
- Beauchamp, William Martin (1908). Past and Present of Syracuse and Onondaga County, New York: From Prehistoric Times to the Beginning of 1908. S.J. Clarke Publishing Company.
