= Axa Towers =

Commercial office buildings in Syracuse, New York

Coordinates: 43.04512°N 76.14984°W

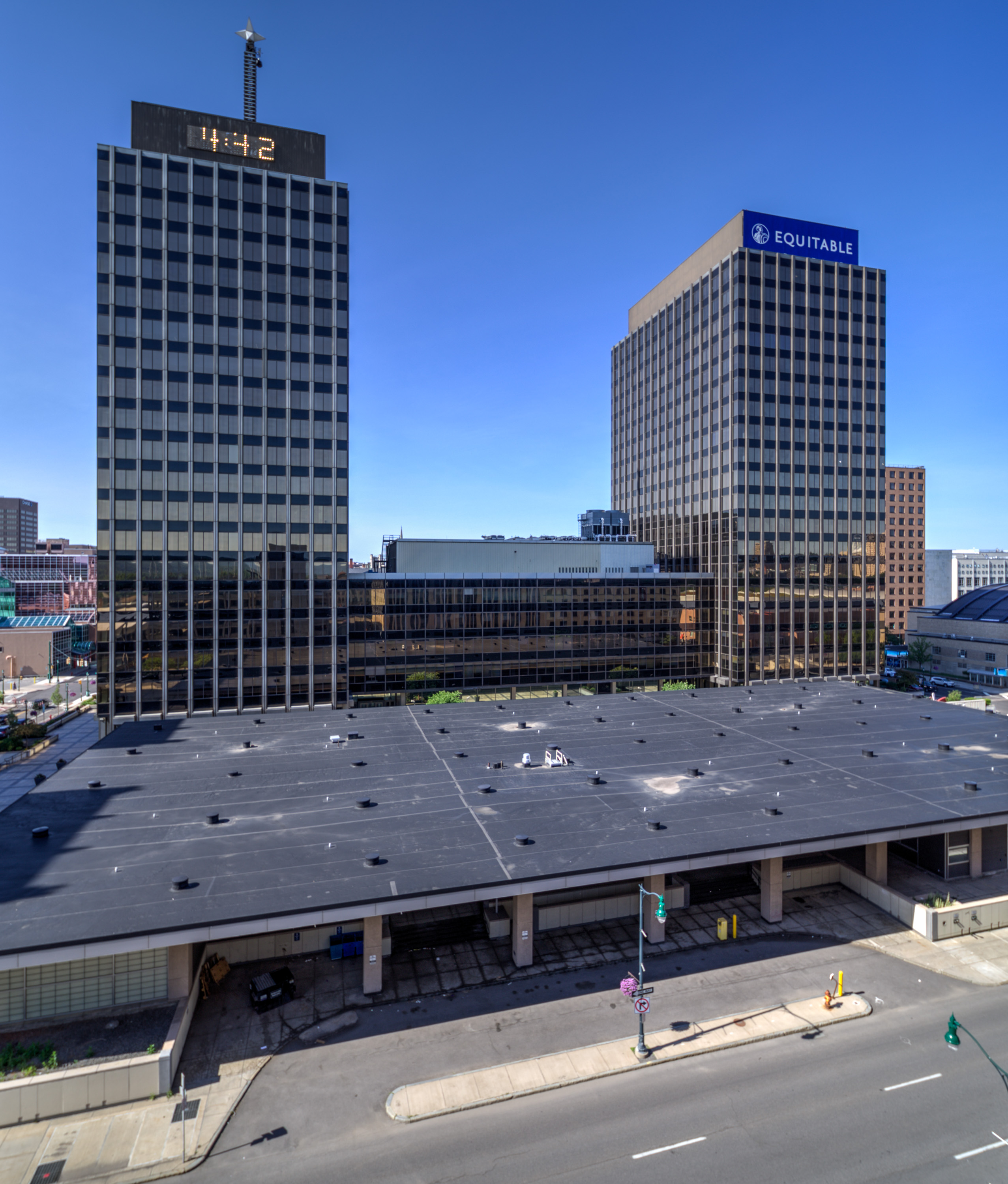
Equitable Towers in 2022

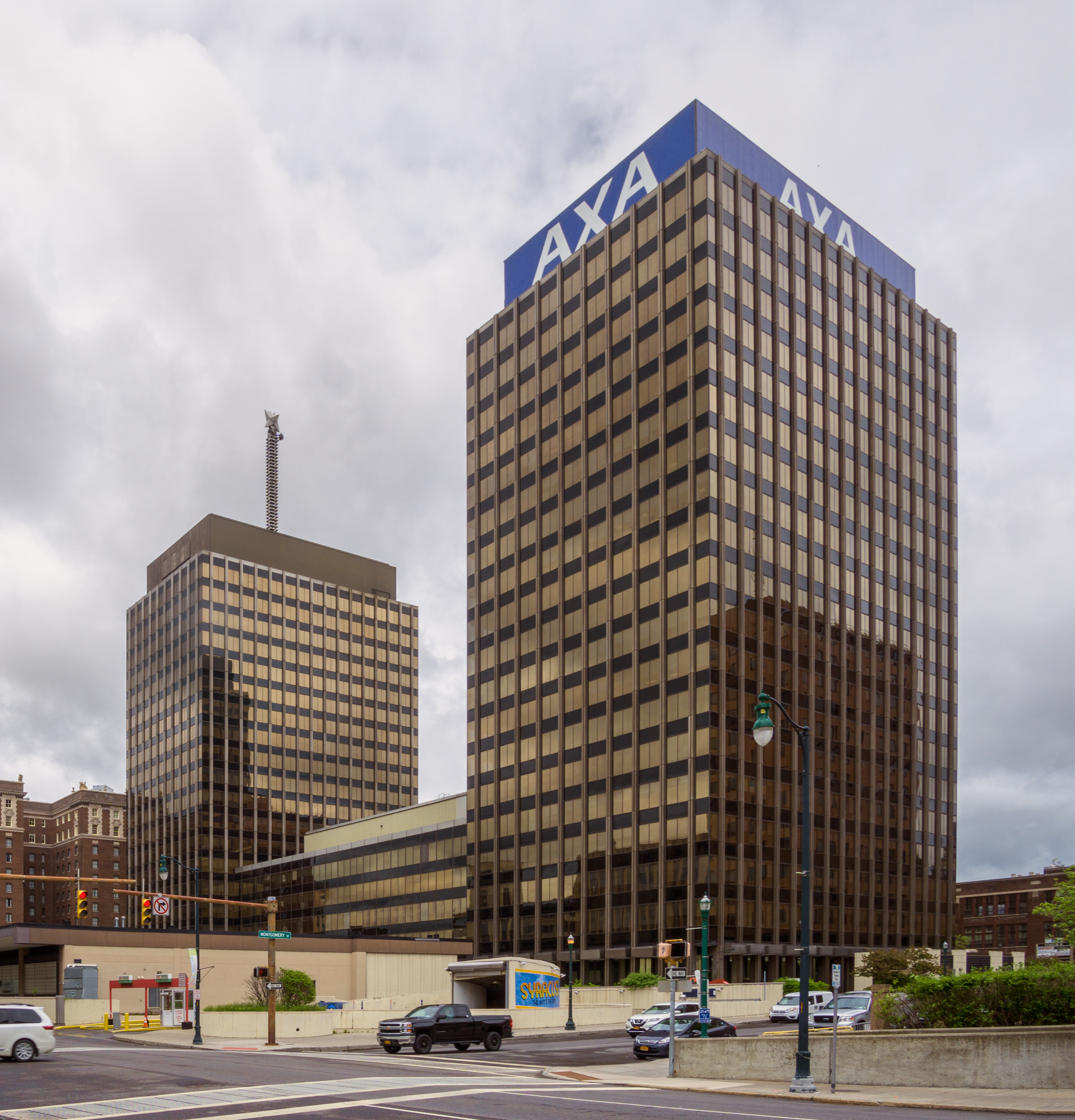
AXA Towers in 2018

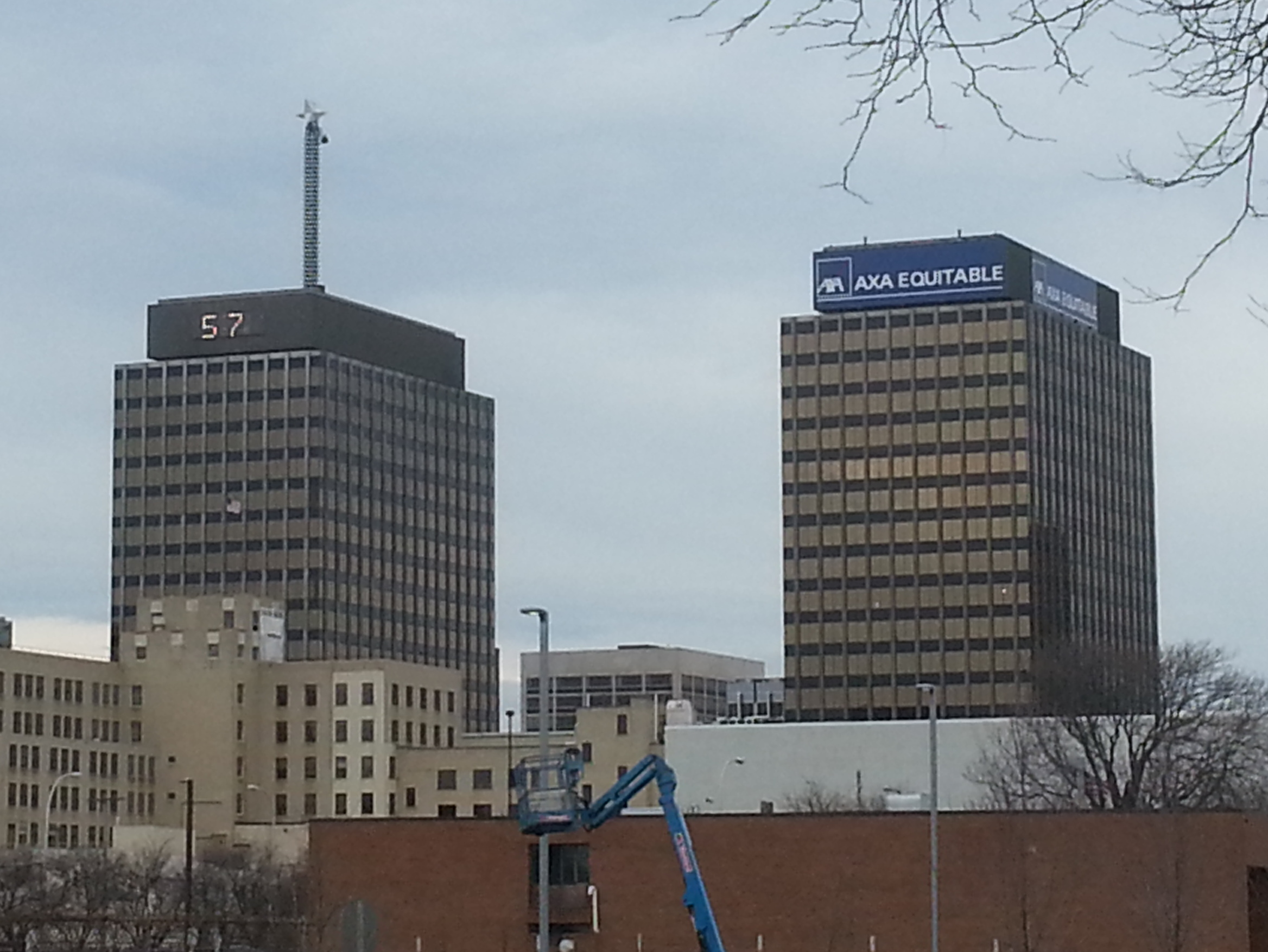
AXA Equitable in 2013

The Equitable Towers, formerly AXA Towers, are two commercial office buildings in Syracuse, New York. Tower 1 and the attached 'Wing' were built and occupied by Mutual of New York (MONY) in 1966. Tower 2 was built by Carrier Corporation in 1971 and named Carrier Tower. Carrier eventually relocated out of Carrier Tower and MONY took possession of both Towers. The Towers were renamed when AXA acquired the MONY group in 2004. They were renamed Equitable Towers in 2020, after AXA was no longer the majority owner of Equitable. The buildings serve as offices for New York–based Equitable Holdings, and have illuminated logos on top.

== Description and history ==
The west building (Tower I) was completed in 1966 as MONY Tower. The east building (Tower II) was built as Carrier Tower in 1971. Both stand at 268 feet (82 meters) and have 19 floors. They are tied for the third tallest buildings in Syracuse. They were both built with a tube-in-tube structural system with a steel and glass curtain wall facade. Tower I has a weather beacon on its roof, and a digital display of time and temperature which can be seen from the north and south sides of the building.

== Name changes ==
Both towers have long featured illuminated logos of their respective companies on top of the buildings. Five names have appeared on the towers since they were completed. Tower I started life as MONY Tower; Tower II was initially known as the Carrier Tower. Then both became MONY Towers, followed by the name Axa Equitable Towers, then simply Axa Towers.

In January 2020 the buildings were renamed Equitable Towers, as the buildings' anchor tenant rebranded itself as Equitable Holdings. The Equitable name and logo appeared on the buildings starting September 2020.

== See also ==
- List of tallest buildings in Syracuse
- List of tallest buildings in Upstate New York
