= Central New York Telephone and Telegraph Building =

Historic commercial building in New York, United States

- U.S. National Register of Historic Places
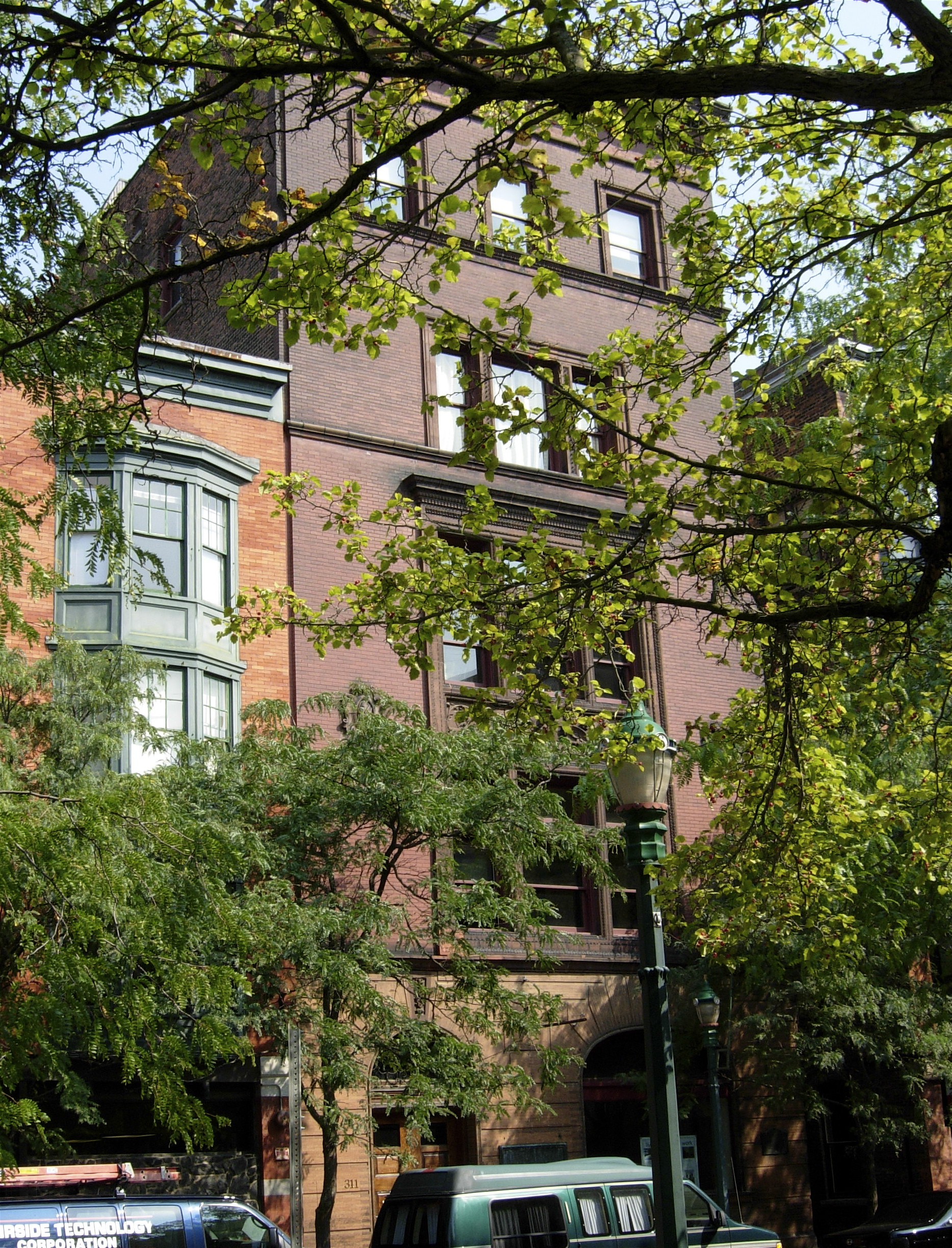

- Location within New York Location within the United States
- Location: 311 Montgomery St., Syracuse, New York
- Coordinates: 43°2′53.44″N 76°8′56.68″W
- Built: 1895
- Architect: Henry W. Wilkinson
- Architectural style: Late 19th And 20th Century Revivals
- NRHP reference No.: 73001234
- Added to NRHP: April 03, 1973

The Central New York Telephone and Telegraph Building, also known as the Onondaga Historical Association Building, designed by Henry W. Wilkinson, was listed on the National Register of Historic Places in 1973, and is part of the Montgomery Street-Columbus Circle Historic District, listed in 1979. It was the first building in Syracuse designed specifically to house the telephone company, and did so from 1899 to 1905, when the company moved to bigger facilities. In 1905, the Onondaga Historical Association purchased the building.
