= Carnegie Building (Syracuse, New York) =

Former Carnegie library building in New York, United States

- Carnegie Library
- U.S. Historic district – Contributing property
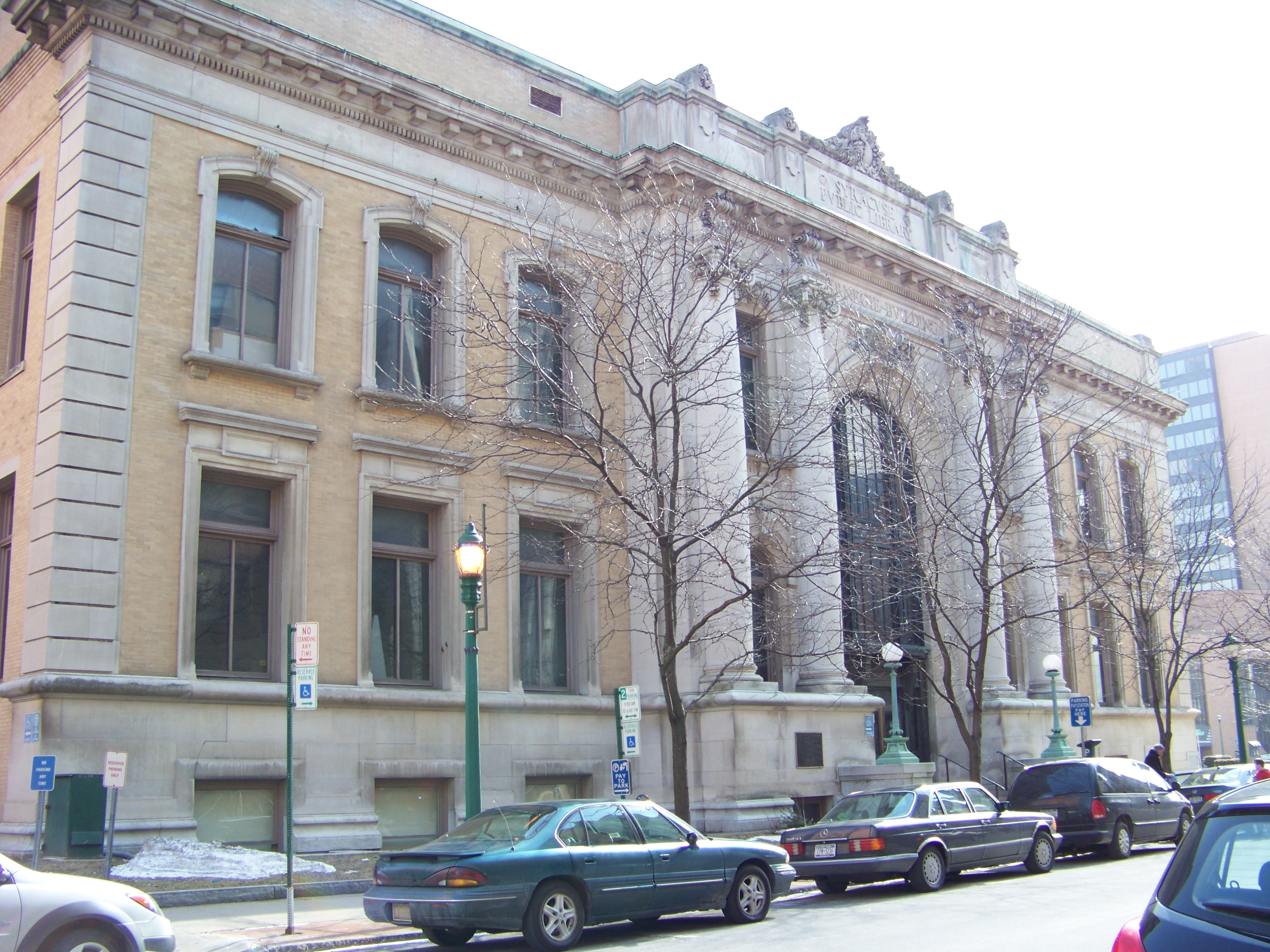

- Location within New York Location within the United States
- Location: 335 Montgomery Street, Syracuse, New York
- Coordinates: 43.04735°N 76.14909°W
- Built: 1902-05
- Architectural style: Beaux Arts
- Part of: Montgomery Street–Columbus Circle Historic District (ID80004278)
- Designated CP: February 19, 1980

The Carnegie Building in Syracuse, New York, previously known as the Syracuse Public Library, is a historic Carnegie library on Montgomery Street at Jefferson Circle in downtown Syracuse. It was built by the City of Syracuse in 1905-06, and came into County of Onondaga ownership in 1976.

The building served as a library for 83 years and was the main library of the Syracuse Public Library system, which merged with Onondaga County's library system in 1976 to become the Onondaga County Public Library System.

As "Carnegie Library", it was listed on the National Register of Historic Places as a contributing building in the Montgomery Street–Columbus Circle Historic District in 1980.

Following acquisition and renovation by the Carnegie Redevelopment Corp., a local development corporation, the building was leased by the Syracuse city school district for 15 years, from 1996 - 2012 when the school district chose not to renew its lease option.

In 2019, after it had sat vacant for eight years, a proposal was floated to renovate it for $4.1 million to hold city and county planning and economic development offices and save on the city's rental costs. The plan was approved in 2021 and work began in 2022, but its current status is unknown as of July 2024.

== See also ==
- Carnegie Library (Syracuse University), the other historic Carnegie library in Syracuse
