= Montgomery Street–Columbus Circle Historic District =

Historic district in New York, United States

- U.S. National Register of Historic Places
- U.S. Historic district
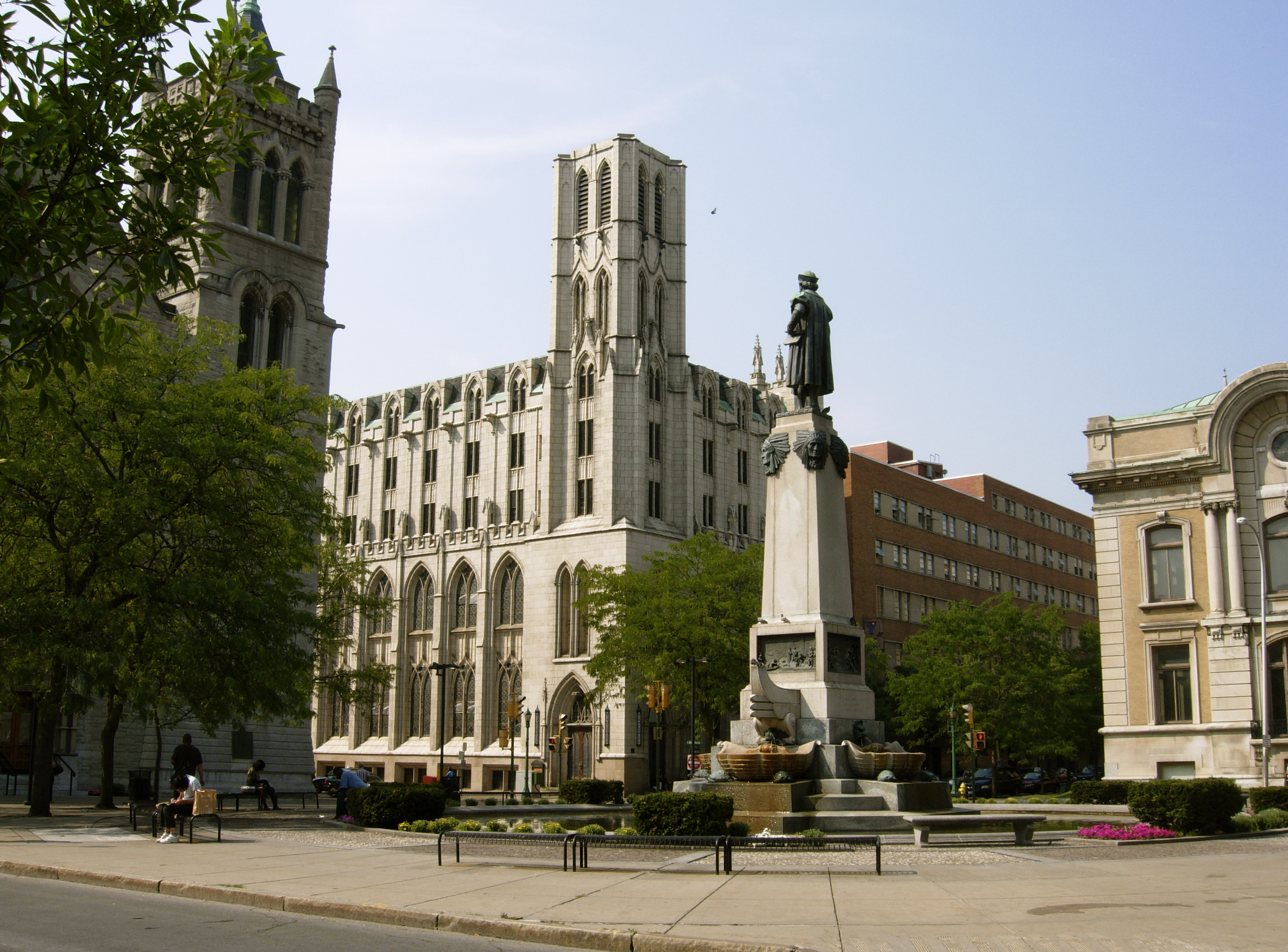
- Columbus Circle, including the Immaculate Conception Cathedral (left), First Baptist Church and Mizpah Tower (center), and the Carnegie Building (right)

- Location within New York Location within the United States
- Location: E. Jefferson, E. Onondaga, Montgomery and E. Fayette Sts., Syracuse, New York
- Coordinates: 43°2′50″N 76°8′59″W
- Built: 1846
- Architectural style: Classical Revival, Beaux Arts, Renaissance Revival
- NRHP reference No.: 80004278 (original); 100011082 (increase)

Significant dates
- Added to NRHP: February 19, 1980
- Boundary increase: December 2, 2024

The Montgomery Street–Columbus Circle Historic District is located in Syracuse, New York, centered around Columbus Circle in the city. It was added to the National Register of Historic Places in 1980, with a boundary revision in 2024.

== Contributing properties ==
	Landmark name	Image	Date Built	Style	Location	Description
1	Hills Building		1928	Gothic; Tudor Revival; Chicago School	217 Montgomery Street	Steel frame office building
2	Commercial Building		ca. 1890		305 Montgomery Street	4 stories; brick
3	St. Paul's Cathedral and Parish House		1885–1907	Gothic	310 Montgomery Street	Limestone church; later parish house; added to the National Register of Historic Places in 1978
4	Onondaga Historical Society Building		1895-96	Federal	311 Montgomery Street	5 stories; brick and terra-cotta; also known as the Central New York Telephone and Telegraph Building; listed separately on the National Register of Historic Places in 1973
5			ca. 1890		315 Montgomery Street	6 stories; brick
6	Masonic Temple		1915–1917	Classical Revival	320 Montgomery Street	5 stories; brick
7	New York Telephone Building		1906	Renaissance Revival	321 Montgomery Street	5 story office building; steel frame; brick and terra-cotta;
8	Pomeroy Building		ca. 1930	Mission style	327 Montgomery Street	2 stories; stucco
9	Carnegie Library		1902-05	Beaux Arts	335 Montgomery Street	Previously known as the Syracuse Public Library; limestone and granite
10	YMCA		1905	Federal	340 Montgomery Street	7 stories; brick; enlarged in the 1950s
11	Fourth Onondaga County Courthouse		1904-06	Beaux Arts	401 Montgomery Street	Designed by Archimedes Russell and Melvin King; ornate interior details
12	First Baptist Church and Mizpah Tower		1912	Gothic	215 East Jefferson Street	Block veneer; religious and residential uses
13	St. Mary's Cathedral and Rectory		1846	Romanesque	239 East Onondaga Street	Limestone church; tower designed by Archimedes Russell; also known as Cathedral of the Immaculate Conception and Bishop's Residence
14	First Gospel Church		1846	Greek Revival	304 East Onondaga Street	Previously known as Wesleyan Methodist Church; constructing congregation was abolitionist
15	Statue of Columbus		ca. 1930		Center of circle	Cast in Italy; stands on 4 foot pedestal; surrounded by moat; enclosed by 2.5 foot planter/bench
