= State Tower Building =

Historic commercial building in New York, United States

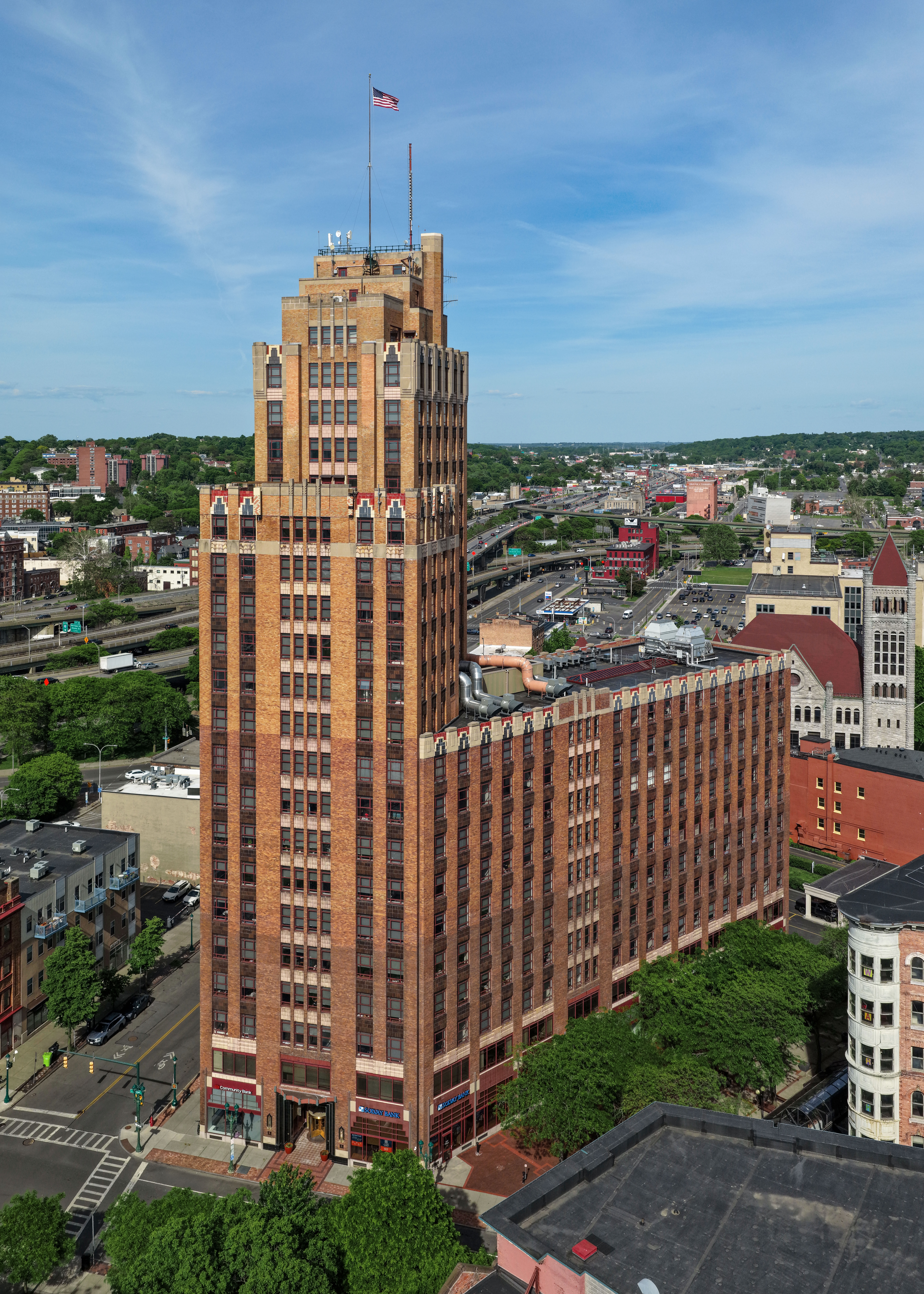
- The State Tower Building in 2026

General information
- Status: Completed
- Type: Office building; residential building
- Architectural style: Art Deco
- Location: 109 South Warren Street; Syracuse, New York 13202; U.S.
- Coordinates: 43°03′01″N 76°09′02″W
- Construction started: 1927
- Completed: 1928
- Opened: 1928
- Renovated: 2016–2018 (conversion to mixed-use residential)
- Cost: $1,750,000 (1928; equivalent to $25182339 in 2024)
- Owner: Pioneer Companies

Height
- Height: 312 ft (95.1 m) (95 m)
- Roof: 312 ft (95.1 m)

Technical details
- Floor count: 23
- Floor area: 172,000 sq ft (15,979 m^{2})
- Lifts/elevators: 6

Design and construction
- Architect: Thompson & Churchill
- Developer: Central New York Properties, Inc.
- Structural engineer: E. W. Clark & Co.
- Main contractor: Dietrich Construction Co.

Website
- statetowersyracuse.com

U.S. National Register of Historic Places
- Type: Contributing property
- Designated: June 22, 1976
- Part of: Hanover Square Historic District
- Reference no.: 76001258

New York State Register of Historic Places
- Designated: June 23, 1980
- Reference no.: 90NR02108

The State Tower Building is a high-rise building located in Syracuse, New York. Completed in 1928 as the city's first skyscraper, the building remains the tallest in Syracuse. It has around 23 floors and is around 312 feet (95 meters) tall.

For several years after the Bastable Theatre burnt down in a 1923 fire, the plot of land it had occupied was considered as the potential site of a new theatre or an office building. Eventually the plot's owners, Central Offices, decided to build an office building. Designed by Thompson & Churchill, work began on the foundation of the State Tower Building in 1927. The tower was completed by late April 1928.

As an office building it was listed on the National Register of Historic Places as a contributing property in the Hanover Square Historic District. In 2016 new owners began work to redevelop the top floors into high-end apartments; retaining the first eight floors as office space.

== Description ==
The Art Deco State Tower Building is located on a plot where Genesee, Warren, and Water streets intersect. The whole block is occupied by the structure, with a tower jutting up on the Warren Street side. The building is made of steel and concrete with a limestone, terra-cotta and brick facade; with the bricks gradually getting lighter towards the top, enhancing the building's perceived height.

It has 21, 23, or 24 stories, and is 312 feet (95 meters) or 331 ft (101 m) tall. The building was designed as a large office building with the first 10 floors being large, and the top floors being setback and smaller such that one entity might occupy an entire floor. On the roof of the tenth floor was a deck on which there was a full-service restaurant.

When first constructed, the building had hollow chambers between the outer and inner walls for insulation. It had about 130,000 sq ft (12,000 m^{2}) floor space, and was designed to provide maximum light. It was connected to a parking garage.

== History ==
=== Block ===
The area where the State Tower Building was constructed was previously occupied by the Bastable block, which had been standing since at least 1852. The block was four stories tall and housed the Shakespeare Hall and arcade. It burnt down on November 20, 1891. Two years later, Frederick Bastable built the Bastable Theatre in its place. Sam S. Shubert managed the theatre to profitability in 1897, booking a variety of sensational shows and comedies. The Bastable block was virtually razed in a 1923 fire; the theatre itself was completely destroyed.

=== Construction ===
In the aftermath of the fire, Stephen Bastable, who owned the block, resolved to replace the Bastable Theatre with an office building. In July 1923 he announced that the block would be filled by a "modern office building". The plot was purchased by Central Offices, led by Albert Mayer and Charles Mayer, who resolved to build an office building on the site. They considered building a larger theatre with an office tower on top of it, and an informal agreement was reportedly reached for leasing of the theatre. However, the plan soon developed further and it became clear that both a theatre and office building could not be built on the site. Plans for a new theatre were dropped.

Designed by architects Thompson & Churchill, the building began to rise in 1927. A foundation was dug largely 23 ft (7.0 m) below street level, which reached 30 ft (9.1 m) down to the north. This was the deepest foundation ever sunk in Downtown Syracuse, below the level of Onondaga Lake, and pumps were necessary to remove constant seepage. Three hundred people were involved in digging, in two shifts of 150. On June 10, the Syracuse Herald reported that the foundation was set to be completed by July 1. The tower was completed by April 29, 1928, and scheduled to be formally opened two days later. On the 29th, an article in the Herald wrote that the tower marked the beginning of a "new era in progress of [the] city". Before opening, 80 percent of the building was leased to commercial tenants. Upon completion, the building was upstate New York's tallest building.

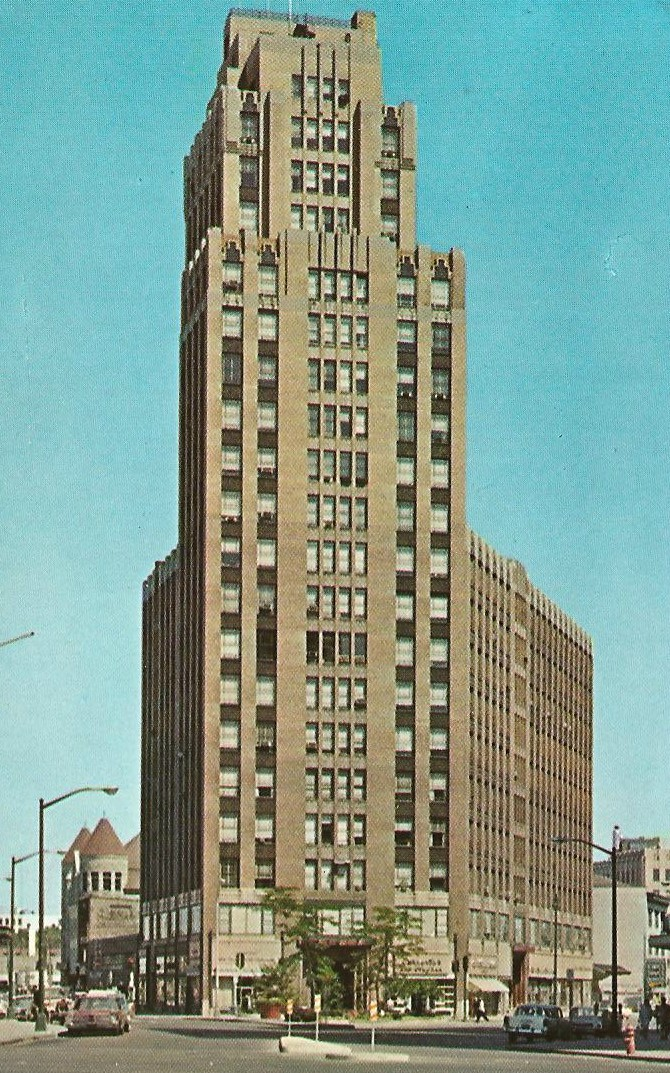
Postcard image

=== Later history ===
The building's exterior was lit at night from its opening to the 1960s. On May 29, 1962, a gas explosion hit the structure, causing an estimated $100,000 in damages, and several injuries. The basement was flooded, fumes traveled through the building, and a minor panic erupted among the 3,000 people occoupants. The building is a contributing property in the Hanover Square Historic District, which was listed on the U.S. National Register of Historic Places in 1976.

It was renovated in 2003.

In the 2000s the State Tower Building gained a pair of peregrine falcons to control pigeons. In 2015, live cameras that offered views of their upper floors nesting box were installed. After 2019 renovations to the building, the box was moved and as of 2021 had not been used in "a couple of years", according to the local office of the Department of Environmental Conservation.

In 2014, some concerns were raised over possible hazards with the facade of the building. Two years later, a developer purchased the building for $5.4 million. As over half of the building was unoccupied, the developers kept only the first 7 floors of the building as office space and from 2016 to 2018 redeveloped the upper floors into 61 high-end apartments. All windows, the roof, and substantial portions of the facade were replaced. A second stairwell was added to the top floors.

The building is the site of "The Climb", a fundraiser that raises money to aid children with cancer in Central New York, with participants ascending its 338 steps.

== Reception ==
The architectural historian Evamaria Hardin describes Syracuse's tallest building as seeming to be the city's "counterpart to New York's Empire State Building". Upon its completion in 1928, the Syracuse Herald described it as "a massive yet graceful combination of colored brick, concrete, tile and hidden steel framework" and deemed it Syracuse's first "skyscraper".

== See also ==
- List of tallest buildings in the United States

== Bibliography ==
- Beauchamp, William Martin (1908). Past and Present of Syracuse and Onondaga County, New York: From Prehistoric Times to the Beginning of 1908. S.J. Clarke Publishing Company.
- Hirsch, Foster (1998). The Boys from Syracuse: The Shuberts' Theatrical Empire. SIU Press. ISBN 978-0-8093-2156-8.
