= Hills Building =

- U.S. Historic district – Contributing property
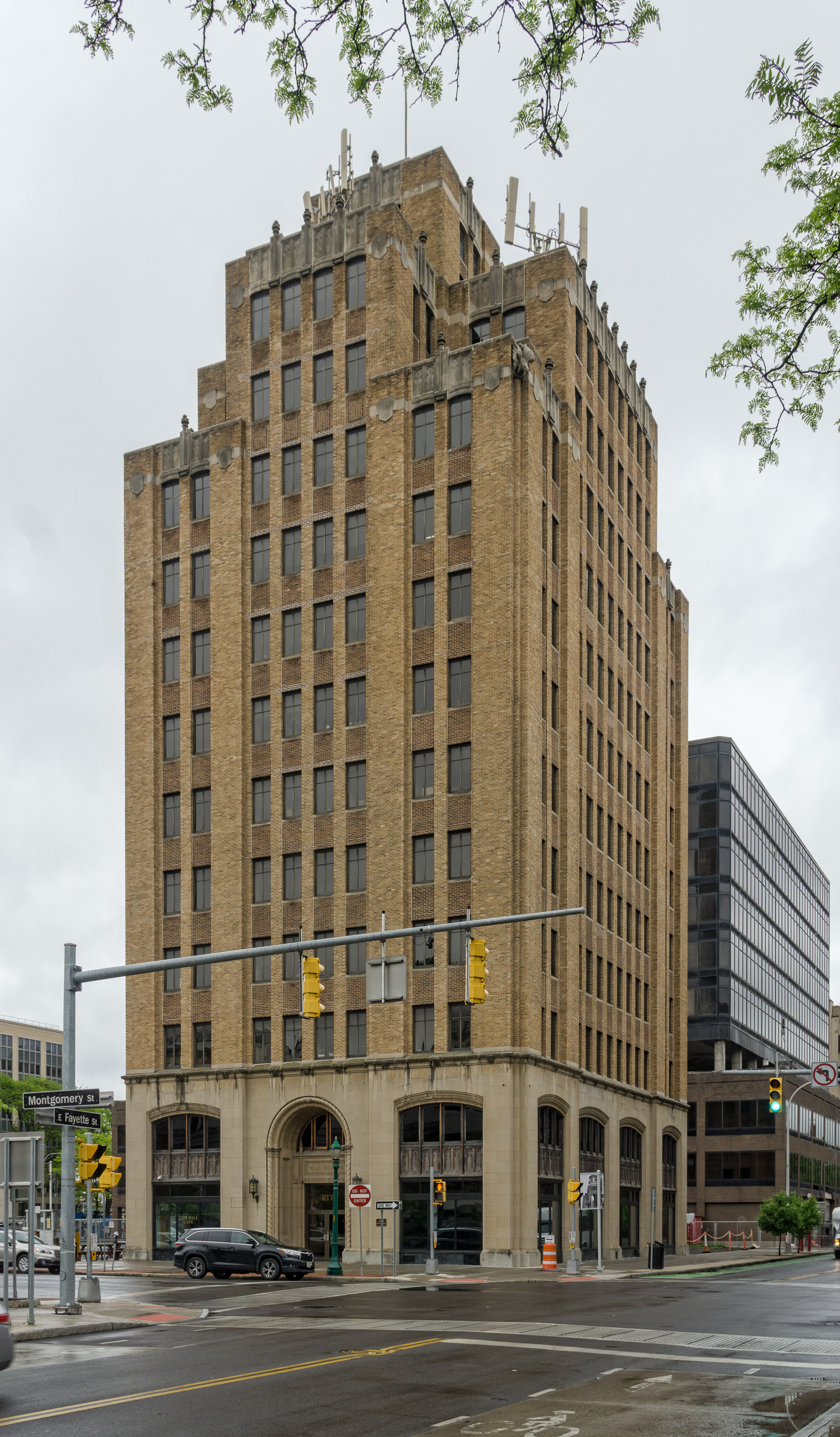

- Location within New York Location within the United States
- Location: 217 Montgomery St, Syracuse, New York
- Coordinates: 43°02′56″N 76°08′56″W
- Built: 1928
- Architect: Melvin L. King
- Architectural style: Gothic Revival
- Part of: Montgomery Street–Columbus Circle Historic District (ID80004278)

The Hills Building is a high-rise office building located in Syracuse, New York.

== History ==
The building was designed by architect Melvin L. King. Construction works were completed in 1928. Its first owner was Clarence Hills, who, back in 1910, had founded one of the largest real estate companies in Syracuse.

The building is a contributing property within the Montgomery Street–Columbus Circle Historic District in Downtown Syracuse since its creation in 1980.

== Description ==
The building is 56.7 metres (186 ft) and 12 floor tall, making it the twelfth highest building in Syracuse as of 2021.

The building is of steel-frame construction and is clad with stone and brick. It features a mixture of Art Deco and Gothic Revival architecture. The verticality of the façades is emphasized by the uninterrupted rising pilasters. Ornamentation includes Gothic-like detailing on the ground floor retail façades, a high-up gargoyle that extends toward the Montgomery-East Fayette intersection, and stone shields above the second floor decorated with the Zodiac signs and at the very top of the tower.
