= Dan Bradley House =

Historic house in New York, United States

- U.S. National Register of Historic Places
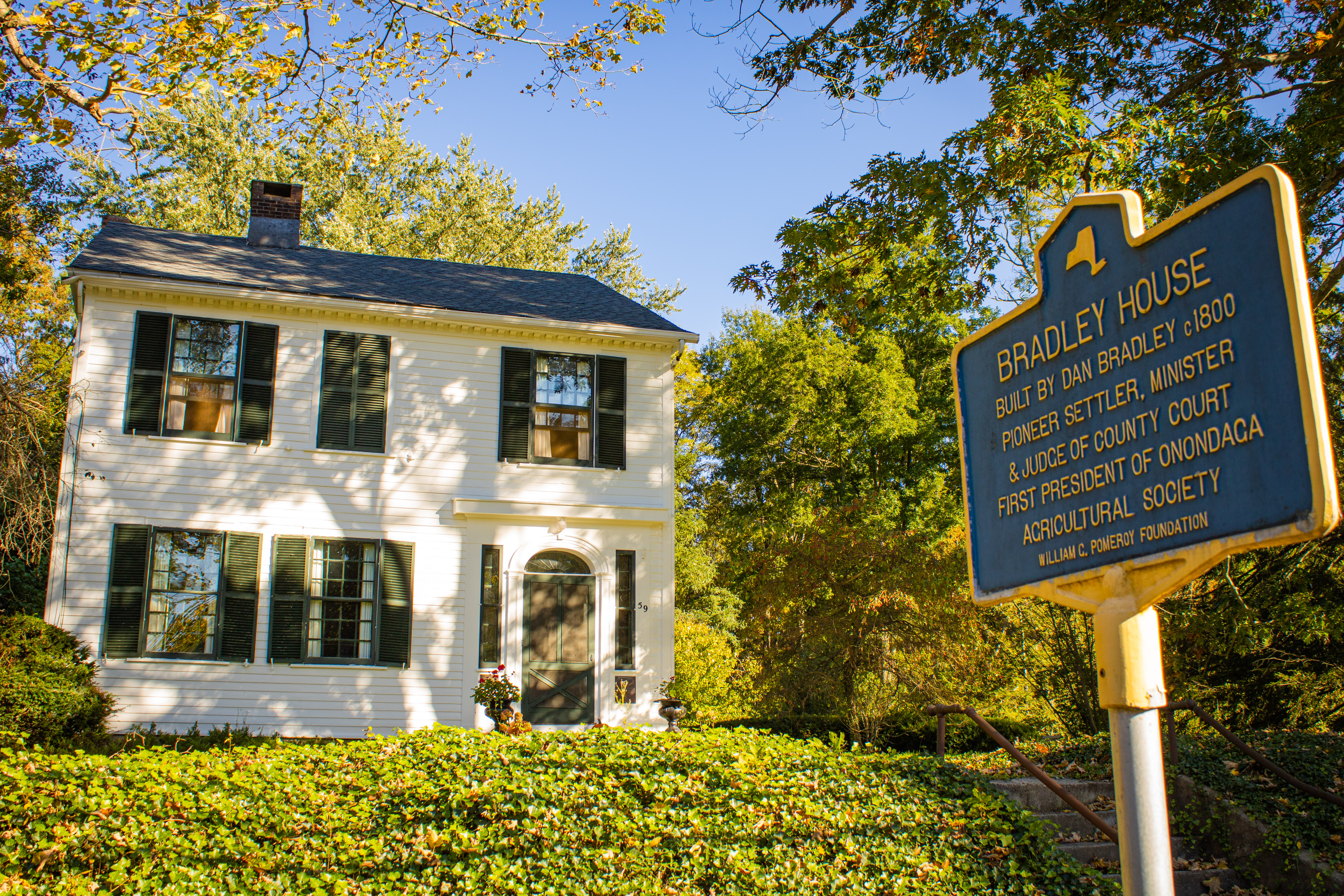
- Dan Bradley House, October 2021

- Location within New York Location within the United States
- Location: 59 South St., Marcellus, New York
- Coordinates: 42°58′35″N 76°20′24″W
- Area: 1.5 acres (0.61 ha)
- Built: 1804-1812
- Architectural style: Federal
- NRHP reference No.: 78001889
- Added to NRHP: December 12, 1978

The Dan Bradley House is a historic house located at 59 South Street in Marcellus, Onondaga County, New York.

== Description and history ==
It was built between about 1804 and 1812, and is a two-story, frame dwelling with a 1 1/2-story rear ell and Federal-style details. Also on the property is a contributing small frame barn. Dan Bradley was a pastor and judge, and his son Dan Beach Bradley, was a 19th-century medical missionary to Thailand.

It was listed on the National Register of Historic Places on December 12, 1978.
