= First Presbyterian Church of Marcellus =

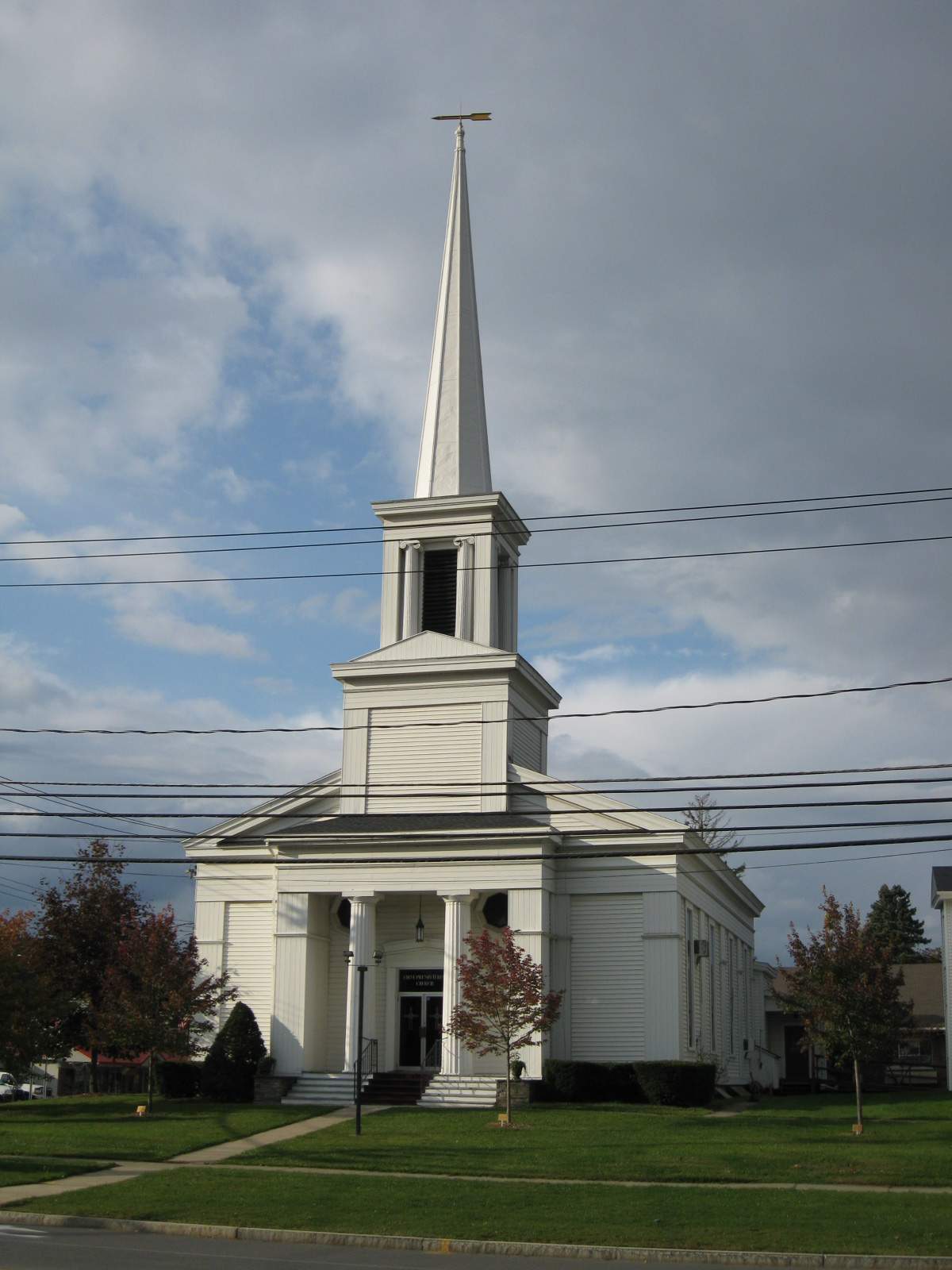
- The church viewed in its full capacity from NY 174
- First Presbyterian Church of Marcellus
- 42°58′58″N 76°20′23″W
- Location: Intersection of East Main and North Streets in Marcellus village, New York
- Country: United States
- Denomination: Presbyterian Church (U.S.A.)

History
- Former name(s): Eastern Religious Society of Marcellus; Marcellus First Religious Society
- Founded: October 13, 1801
- Founder: Reverend Caleb Alexander
- Dedicated: October 13, 1851

Architecture
- Completed: 1851 (current)
- Construction cost: $3,800

Clergy
- Pastor: Interim pastor

The First Presbyterian Church of Marcellus is a local Presbyterian church in the village of Marcellus, New York. Located at the intersection of North Street (New York State Route 174) and East Main Street (also NY 174) in downtown Marcellus. The church is the oldest and one of four churches in the village alone. The original formation of the church dates back to October 1801, when the Reverend Caleb Alexander was successful in creating an 18-member church in Marcellus known as the Church of Christ. Two years later, a wooden meeting house was constructed, but was not the normal style for a regular church. Levi Parsons was the reverend for several decades, starting in 1807 to 1841, when he was replaced by a new pastor.

By 1819, three churches had been built in the land that contained Marcellus, but the second church constructed eventually hit an ill-fate when membership dwindled. This second church is located now in the town of Skaneateles. The third church was opened in January 1819, when the society was moved off the local State Road (now U.S. Route 20). From 1948 to 1956, the entire church was revamped, along with being raised. The church was then dedicated in April 1952. In 1957, the church then elected its first woman elder, and by 1978, the church had 9 women of 18 members.

== Original church (1803–1851) ==
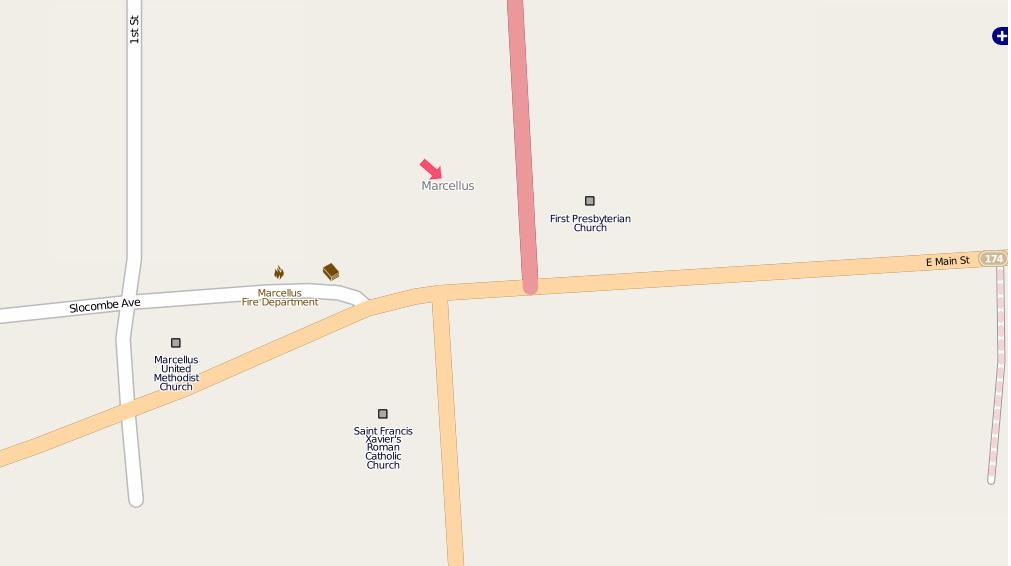
The location of the church as viewed with OpenStreetMap

Originally, before the creation of the church society, local residents in Marcellus, established in 1794, would head over a local deacon's tavern for prayer and worship. These few residents where those of different religions, including Baptists. The local deacon, Samuel Rice, could not write a sermon on his own, but he could read one to the locals as a normal minister could. Just seven years after the creation of Marcellus, the town's residents opened their first worship society on October 13, 1801. A lot of the creation is handed to Reverend Caleb Alexander, who put a lot of effort into opening. Alexander was also in the meantime running a missionary in the areas around central New York. In 1802, the church was then given the name as the Eastern Religious Society of Marcellus.

The religious society now opened in Marcellus, had four men in charge as trustees, Dan Bradley, Martin Godard, Thomas North, and Nathan Kelsey. On August 12, 1802, the heads of the society took a vote to decide whether or not to build a church. The vote supported, and three men: Nathan Leonard, Samuel Tyler and James Geddes, Esquire were then hired to select a site for the future building. Dan Bradley, one of the trustees, donated an acre of land at the intersection of Main Street and North Street in the current-day village for use. The society accepted the land and in 1803, construction of a 55 foot by 45 foot wooden meeting house was completed. However, the building itself had no steeples, bell, stoves or ceilings. The members got heat by foot stoves, squirrel fur and the power of spirit.

The meeting house and church used the labor of missionaries for the first few years since inception, but in 1807, the church and religious society accepted the 15 Articles of Faith and Covenant. These articles of faith were what kept the membership requisites for the next 100 years. Also in that year, the church itself became a partner in relation with the Presbyterian Synod of Albany. In 1807, the first reverend was appointed, known as Levi Parsons. He served the community well until 1833, when he went to preach a year in the nearby community of Tully and another year in Otisco. After that, he returned to Marcellus, serving there until 1841. In the time he had left, however, the society changed its name to the Marcellus First Religious Society. Once Reverend Parsons ended preaching in 1841, he was then replaced by a new reverend, John Tompkins.

By 1819, during the reign of Reverend Parsons, the church had grown exponentially, with a second church opening in what is now Skaneateles, and a third church opening in Marcellus, along the State Road (now U.S. Route 20). The second church, started off for the first 20 years well, but after death and migrations, did not gain very much support and this later decided its fate. Also during this time, the first church, back in the village, was given improvements, including a new steeple, painted and extended, all at a cost of $4,500 (1814 USD). However, by 1850, the old meeting house, also known as the First Church, was in desperate need of repairs. The old meeting house was sold at a cost of $500 (1850 USD), which would go to building a brand new church. This new church was to cost $3,800.

== Present church (1851–present) ==
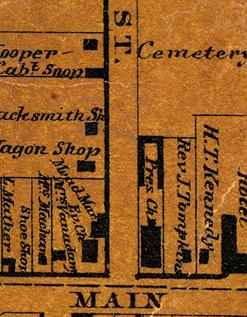
A map from 1860 detailing the location of the church and the home of Reverend John Tompkins

Construction of a brand new church in downtown Marcellus started and completed, and by 1851, it was finished. On October 13, 1851, the 50th anniversary of the society, the new church was dedicated. Two years later, a new bell was constructed as an addition to the new building. In 1866, Reverend Tompkins, who had been there since Parsons' leave in 1841, suddenly died on the eve of his 25th anniversary as reverend. In the time of his reign, he had married 257 couples and several people more than once. With Reverend Tompkins' death, the church appointed two interim ministers, Reverend W. S. Franklin and Reverend Dwight Scovel, who ran the church until Reverend George Smith was appointed to the job in 1880. Smith ran the job for only two years, and in 1882, after the church had become part of the Syracuse Presbytery, Smith left the church for a principal position at Canandaigua Academy.

However, before Smith left the church, he had helped the church celebrate its 80th anniversary on October 13, 1881. To celebrate this anniversary, Smith wrote a complete history in text of the church. With Smith's leave, the new reverend appointed was Alex McA. Thornburn, who served the community for five years. On November 16. 1887, Reverend Thornburn was then replaced by Reverend A. H. Cameron, who served ten prospering years with the church. In 1893 and 1894, under Reverend Cameron's reign, the church was revamped once again, with new kitchens, a church parlor, new stained glass windows, and a brand-new heating system, replacing the original stoves. Also during Reverend Cameron's time, the church began to perform Sunday school classes in outlying areas, so residents who could not make it to church had a place to learn. Places where this were performed include Marcellus Falls (north of town), and Shepard Settlement, a nearby hamlet.

In 1897, Reverend Cameron was then replaced by Reverend A. K. McNaughton, who served another ten years with the growing church. Reverend McNaughton helped celebrate the 100th anniversary of the church on October 13, 1901, with a large program arranged. After McNaughton left in 1907, he was then replaced by Reverend F. J. Sauber, who served the community church until 1914. The next minister, Reverend C. C. Frost, was appointed as the replacement, and stayed until 1921, when Reverend David S. MacGinn took over until 1928. During Reverend MacGinn's reign, the church's sheds, which were constructed in 1849, just before the current church, were torn down in 1922. New ones were constructed until 1961, when they were torn down for an extension of the church. These sheds were rented for several years to local car owners as garages.

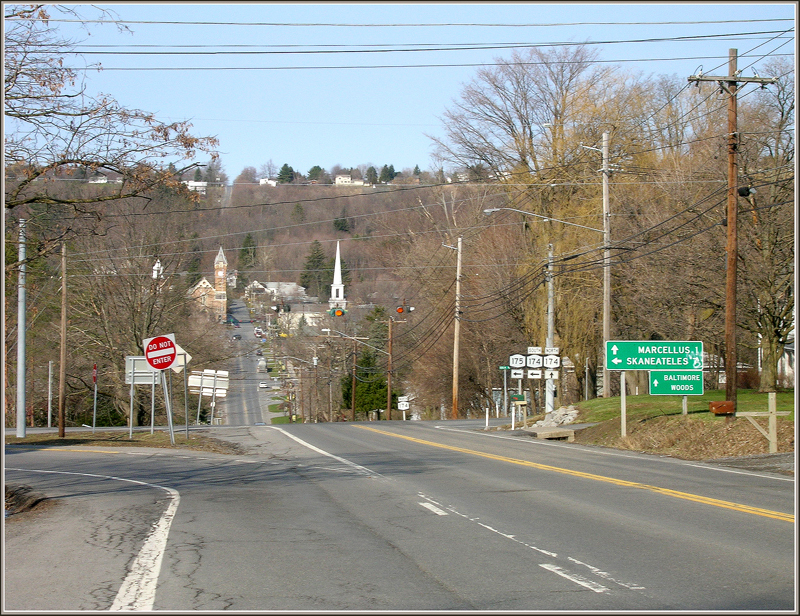
View of Marcellus from NY 174/NY 175 intersection. The church is visible in the distance

A severe windstorm hit Marcellus in 1924, and in the storm, the church's spire toppled off its roost and fell into the church. The spire, after collapsing, stuck two feet into the church. A new one was constructed soon after at a cost of $3,500 (1924 USD). From 1948 to 1956, Reverend Ralph Miller ran the congregation, and in this time, the church itself sustained some changes. The height of the building was raised and a furnished basement was constructed to the building. The construction helped add a kitchen, dining room, lounge and several new classrooms into the church. The sanctuary of the church was also redone, all at a cost of $65,000 (1952 USD). The church was then dedicated after completion in April 1952. On December 9, 1956, Reverend Miller was replaced by Reverend Keith Shinaman, a graduate of Syracuse University.

In 1957, the first women elder in the history of the church was ordained. However, by 1978, the number of women on the 18-member elder program including nine women. Reverend Shinaman remained in reign as minister for over fifty years, and was eventually replaced as minister by Reverend Bill Grossman, who runs the congregation currently along with Reverend Shinaman, who is the minister emeritus. In 2001, the church celebrated its 200th anniversary and in 2011, will celebrate its 210th.
