= St. John the Baptist Greek Catholic Church =

Church in New York, United States

Coordinates: 43°2′53.9″N 76°10′48.8″W

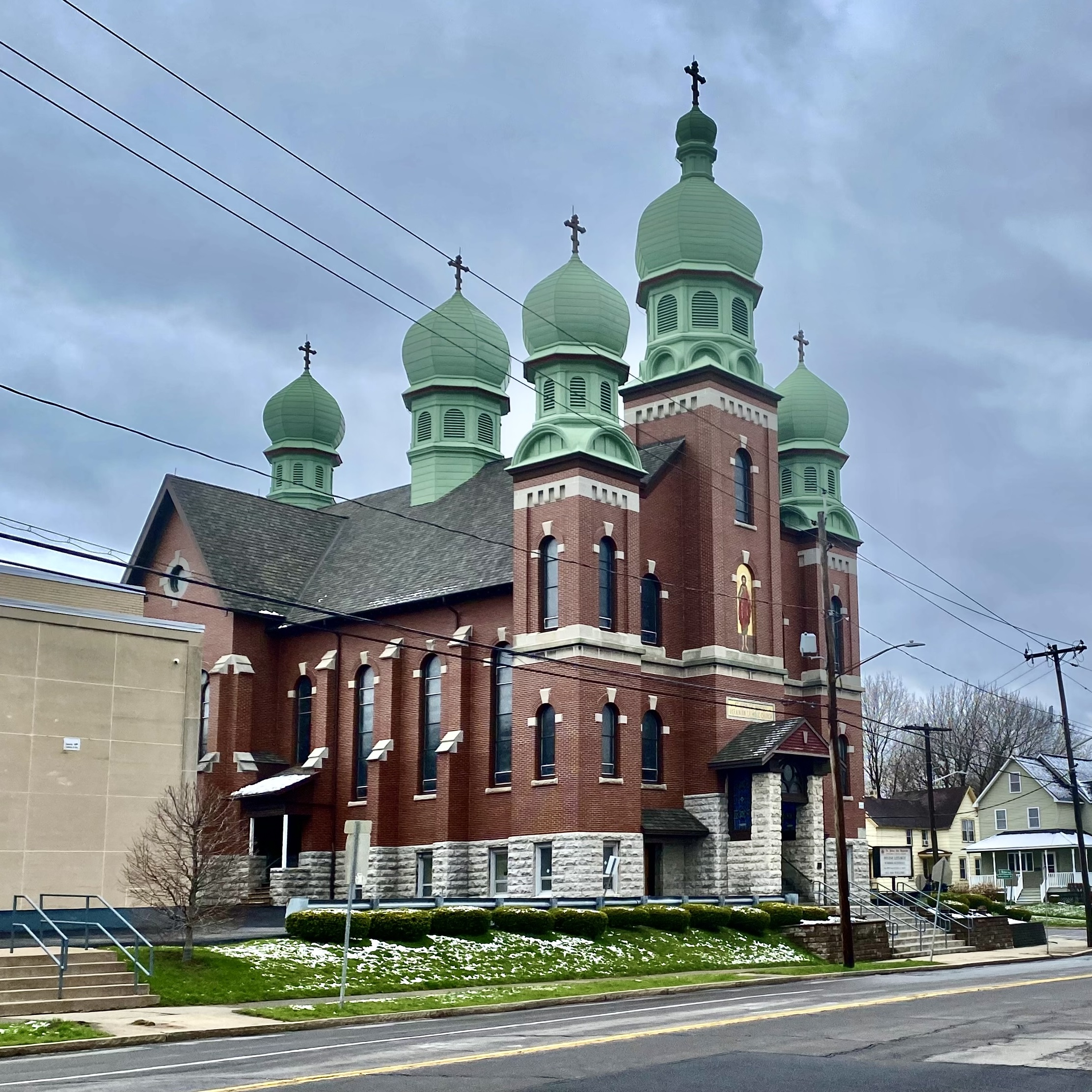
As seen in April 2022

St. John the Baptist Ukrainian Catholic Church is a parish of the Ukrainian Greek Catholic Church located in Syracuse, New York, at the corner of Tompkins Street and Wilbur Avenue. Constructed in 1913, it was the first Eastern Catholic church in the city.

In recent years, local business owner, Peter Coleman, resurrected the idea within the local Ukrainian community of erecting a statue of the Ukrainian Bard Taras Shevchenko in front of the church. A committee consisting of Ukrainian-Americans was formed to undertake the task of designing and erecting the monument to Taras Shevchenko. The local Ukrainian community along with several neighbors in Tipperary Hill section of Syracuse raised the necessary funds for the monument. The monument to Taras Shevchenko was dedicated in the autumn of 2005. Attending the dedication and unveiling ceremony were Syracuse Mayor Matt Driscoll, the Consulate General of Ukraine, New York State representatives and a multitude of Ukrainian-Americans. Following the unveiling ceremony, a commemorative concert was held at the Syracuse Ukrainian National Home.

== Church groups ==
According to church records, the following groups were organized:

- 1893 - Branch 34 of the Greek Catholic Union (Soiedineniie) – Organized by the first immigrants, Rusyns or Rusnaky.
- 1900 - Sts. Peter & Paul Society, Branch 39 of the Ruskii Narodnŷi Soiuz/later Ukrainian National Association – Organized by the Lemko immigrants.
- 1912 - St. Olga's Providence Association
- 1921 - Ukrainian Church Choir
- 1921 - Amateur Dramatic Circle
- 1925 - Sacred Heart Society
- 1926 - Ukrainian-American Citizens Club
- 1932 - Catholic Daughters
- 1933 - Ukrainian Catholic Youth Organization
- 1937 - Ukrainian Central Committee
- 1946 - Ukrainian-American Catholic War Veterans, Post 560
- 1950 - Junior Sodality
- 1950 - Altar Society
- 1955 - Mother's Club (school)
- 1955 - Holy Name Society
- 1997 - Our Lady of Mercy Society
