= Columbus Circle, Syracuse =

Columbus Circle
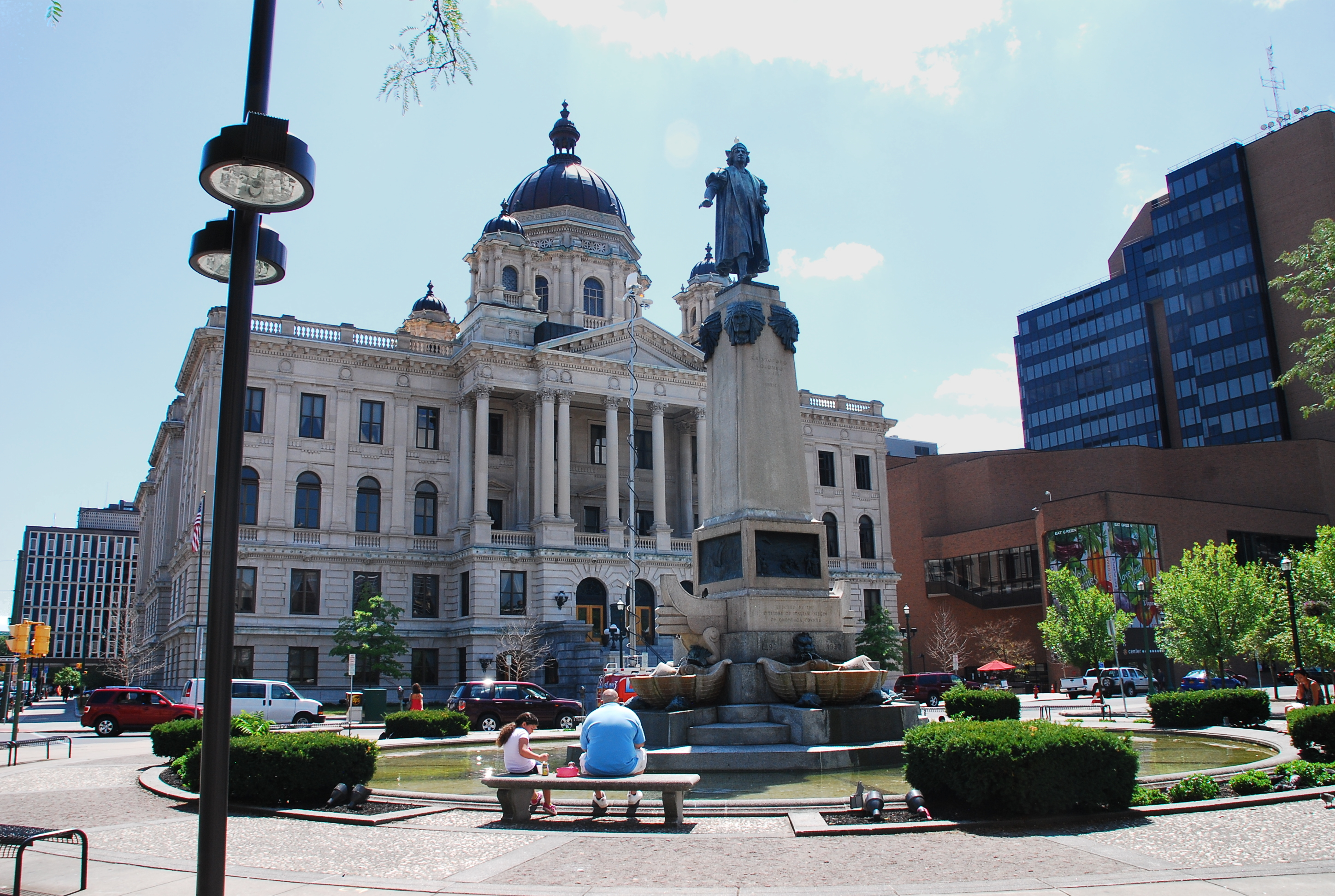
- County Courthouse at Columbus Circle

- Location within New York
- 43°2′48.6″N 76°8′56.7″W
- Location: Syracuse, New York, US

History
- Established: 1895

Site notes
- Area: 0.160 acres (0.00065 km^{2})
- Governing body: City of Syracuse

Columbus Circle is a neighborhood and plaza in the downtown section of Syracuse, New York, United States. At the center of the circle is a large fountain and the Columbus Monument, designed by the Syracuse-born architect Dwight James Baum and dedicated in 1934. Columbus Circle is home to Syracuse's two cathedrals, the Episcopalian St. Paul's Cathedral and the Roman Catholic Cathedral of the Immaculate Conception, as well as the Onondaga County Courthouse and the John H. Mulroy Civic Center.

The circle, originally known as Library Circle and later as St. Mary's Circle, began as a chiefly residential district. Beginning in the early 20th century it slowly developed as government and commercial buildings were constructed. From 1913 to 1933 the circle hosted to the city's annual tree lighting. After the Columbus Monument's dedication in 1934, it was the site of annual memorial services on Columbus Day and protests advocating for the statue's removal. In October 2020 the city of Syracuse announced plans to remove the statue of Christopher Columbus and redevelop the circle into "Heritage Park." As of 2025, the statue has not been moved.

== Name ==
Columbus Circle was initially known as Library Circle and later as St. Mary's Circle. It was also known as Courthouse Square at some time. It is unclear precisely when the circle's name changed to Columbus Circle. A 1952 article in The Post-Standard reported that, while the paper had records indicating that the circle was officially renamed in October 1932, the city had found no records to supported this.

== Description ==
The main feature in the circle is a large bronze statue of Christopher Columbus, known as the Columbus Monument. The statue is on a pedestal in the middle of a fountain that is Syracuse's largest; the monument as a whole is approximately 40 feet (12 m) tall.

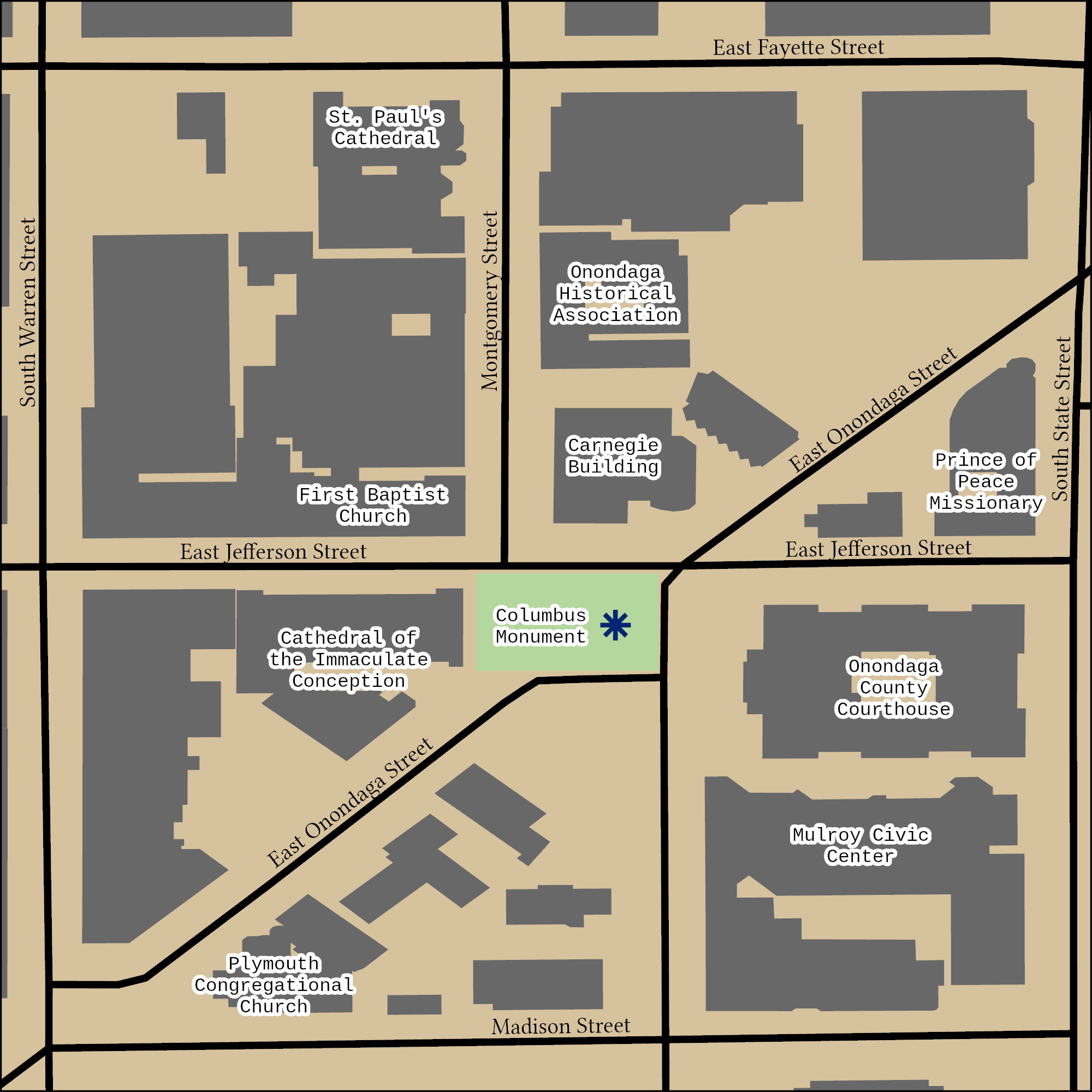
Map of Columbus Circle including buildings in the surrounding area.

=== Historic buildings ===
In the region around the circle are various historic buildings, several of which have been listed on the National Register of Historic Places as the Montgomery Street–Columbus Circle Historic District. These include Syracuse's two cathedrals; the Episcopalian St. Paul's Cathedral, constructed in a Gothic Revival style in 1885, and the Roman Catholic Cathedral of the Immaculate Conception, constructed in 1886. Other buildings listed include the Fourth Onondaga County Courthouse (1903–1906), the First Baptist Church and Mizpah Hotel (1912), Plymouth Congregational Church (1859), and the first Syracuse Public Library (1901–1902). The John H. Mulroy Civic Center is also around the circle.

== History ==
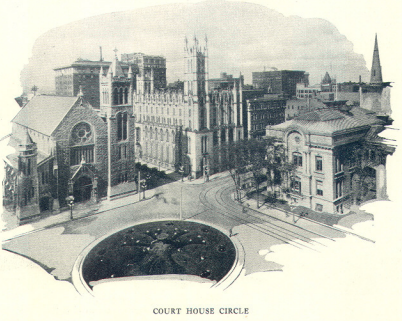
St. Mary's Circle c. 1926

The circle began as a "quietly residential place with several churches within walking distance". In the early 1900s it began to develop with the construction of buildings including the Syracuse Public Library and Onondaga County Courthouse. As the century progressed further commercial and governmental buildings were built in the area surrounding the circle. In 1910 the circle held a grove of Eucalyptus globulus trees. A 1911 letter to the editor of The Post-Standard by Bishop Ludden suggested putting a statue of Gabriel in the center of the circle.

From 1913 to 1933 Syracuse held an annual Christmas tree lighting during the Christmas and holiday season at the circle. The tree lighting began as a project headed by the Syracuse Consumers' League and was funded by groups including the cities Chamber of Commerce, Rotary Club, and the Syracuse Herald. The tree was 50 feet (15 m) tall and supplied by the New York State College of Forestry. The Parks department oversaw its installment, while lights were supplied by the Syracuse Lighting Company. In 1933 the tree lighting was moved to Clinton Square.

=== Columbus Circle and Monument ===
Torquato De Felice, a professor of fine arts at Syracuse University had suggested a monument in Syracuse to Christopher Columbus as early as 1909. De Felice and Seraphino Chiarulli have been credited with spearheading early advocacy for the statue. The following year De Felice met with Lorenzo Baldi (also spelled V. Renzo Baldi), a sculptor in Florence, Italy.

Funds for the statues construction were mainly raised by Italian Americans living in the city, through a Columbus Monument Association. Fundraising halted during World War I, but resumed shortly after its end. Fundraising efforts included boxing matches on August 11, 1933, notably between Primo Carnera and Jack Sharkey, at The Arena in Syracuse. It was attended by approximately 5,000 people but little funding actually went to the monument after expenses were paid. According to a 2014 biography of Carnera, he was in favor of the statue as an Italian American himself, and had personally worked to be involved in the match.

After $18,000 had been raised, discussions began on where to place the statue. Many Italian Americans advocated in favor of St. Mary's Circle, while others proposed Loguen Park (at the time Columbus Park), Fayette Park, and Onondaga Park. The location was set as St. Mary's Circle in March 1932. That year also saw a lawsuit by Joseph Pollia, arguing that he had been chosen to be the sculptor. It was dismissed. Dwight James Baum was hired to design the monument. Baldi formally was hired to sculpt the monument out of bronze.

With the onset of the Great Depression in 1929 it became more expensive to fund transport of the monument and stone that it would be placed on from Italy to Syracuse as the value of the US dollar decreased. In response, another round of fundraising was undertaken. The Monument Association planned to unveil and dedicate the monument on Columbus Day 1933. Negotiations over the cost of transport ensured the statue did not arrive in time. Benito Mussolini, Italy's dictator at the time, supplied additional funds for shipping and also the sculpture's inscription "Christoforo Colombo, Discoverer of America." By October 15, 1933, the monument itself was on route from Italy to Syracuse. It was scheduled to arrive around November 6. The granite for the monument's base was shipped along the New York Barge Canal and arrived in Syracuse on November 21. The Columbus Monument was dedicated on October 12, 1934, at a ceremony attended by several thousand people. The Syracuse Herald estimated the crowd at 20,000 people, 3,000 of whom participated in a parade around the city.

=== Later history ===
The US President Lyndon B. Johnson visited Syracuse in August 1966; he was scheduled to travel through the circle at 4:40 pm to a fanfare with Patti Page singing, bands playing, and local leaders introducing him before giving a speech for approximately 20 minutes on water pollution. In preparation for his visit, the upper floors around the circle were to be cleared and the library closed. Johnson was seen by an estimated 100,000 people, including an estimated 20,000 to 25,000 in the circle alone. Precautions taken before his visit were described as "the tightest security in local history". In 1992 the statue was restored with state and private funds; the project cost about $550,000, of which approximately one third was paid for by descendants of Italian American immigrants in the region. The restoration included re-addition of four bronze sculptures of Native American heads to the monument that had been stolen in the late 1930s and were found in Orlando, Florida in 1986.

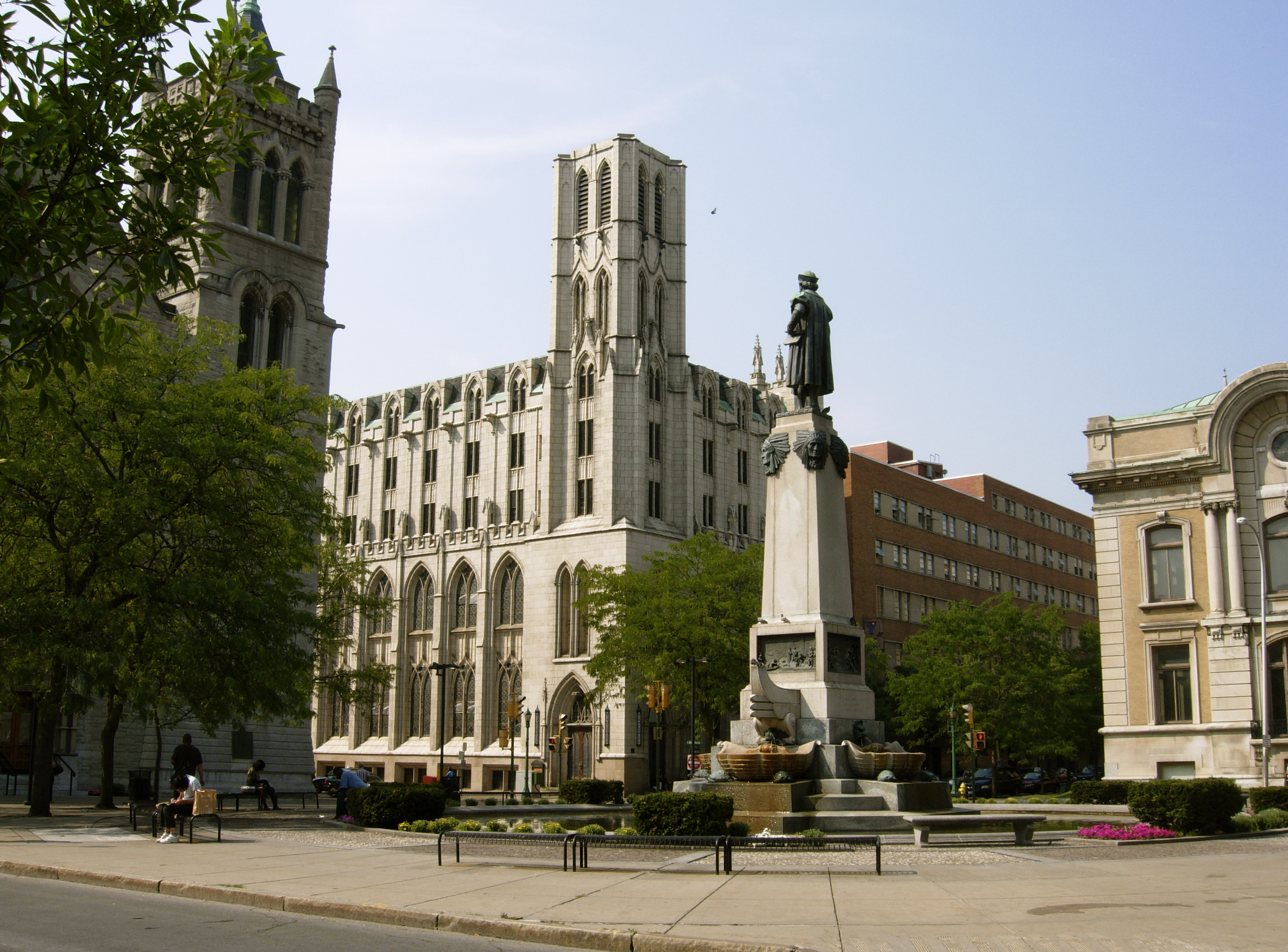
Columbus Circle in 2008

Annual ceremonies held on Columbus Day in the circle began with the statue's dedication. Protests against the statue, often at the same time as the ceremonies, were held dating back to at least 1991. Protesters argued that the statue represented "pain and trauma to" Native Americans and said it should be taken down, while the Columbus Monument Corporation and many Italian Americans argued that the statue was an important part of Syracuse's history and monument to their heritage. John Katko, the region's member of the House of Representatives, suggested adding a statue of Hiawatha and retaining the statue of Columbus.

The mayor of Syracuse, Ben Walsh, worked with InterFaith Works, a local charity, to lead community discussions on the statue in 2018 and 2019, as well as community forums. In 2020 he established a formal advisory council, the Columbus Circle Action Group, to consider ways to modify the circle. That group put forth a number of ideas, but its report did not suggest that the statue be removed. After repeated protests against the statue, including a petition with over 12,500 signatures and the Onondaga Nation formally advocating its removal, on October 9, 2020, Walsh announced plans to remove the statue of Christopher Columbus and redevelop the circle into "Heritage Park".

Under the plan, the statue would be moved to a private location while the rest of the monument and fountain would remain. Walsh proposed adding an additional portion to educate on often oppressed groups. A lawsuit was filed in May 2021 aimed at halting the removal, maintaining that Walsh was acting beyond his authority in ordering it. The court began to hear the Columbus Monument Corporation's lawsuit on January 13, 2022, to a crowded courtroom. On March 11, 2022, County Supreme Court Justice Gerard Neri found that the city had no right to remove the statue. In the summer of 2023, the 4th district of the New York Supreme Court, Appellate Division overturned Neri's decision. As of May 2026, no work has begun to take the statue down.
