= South Salina Street Downtown Historic District =

Historic district in New York, United States

- U.S. National Register of Historic Places
- U.S. Historic district
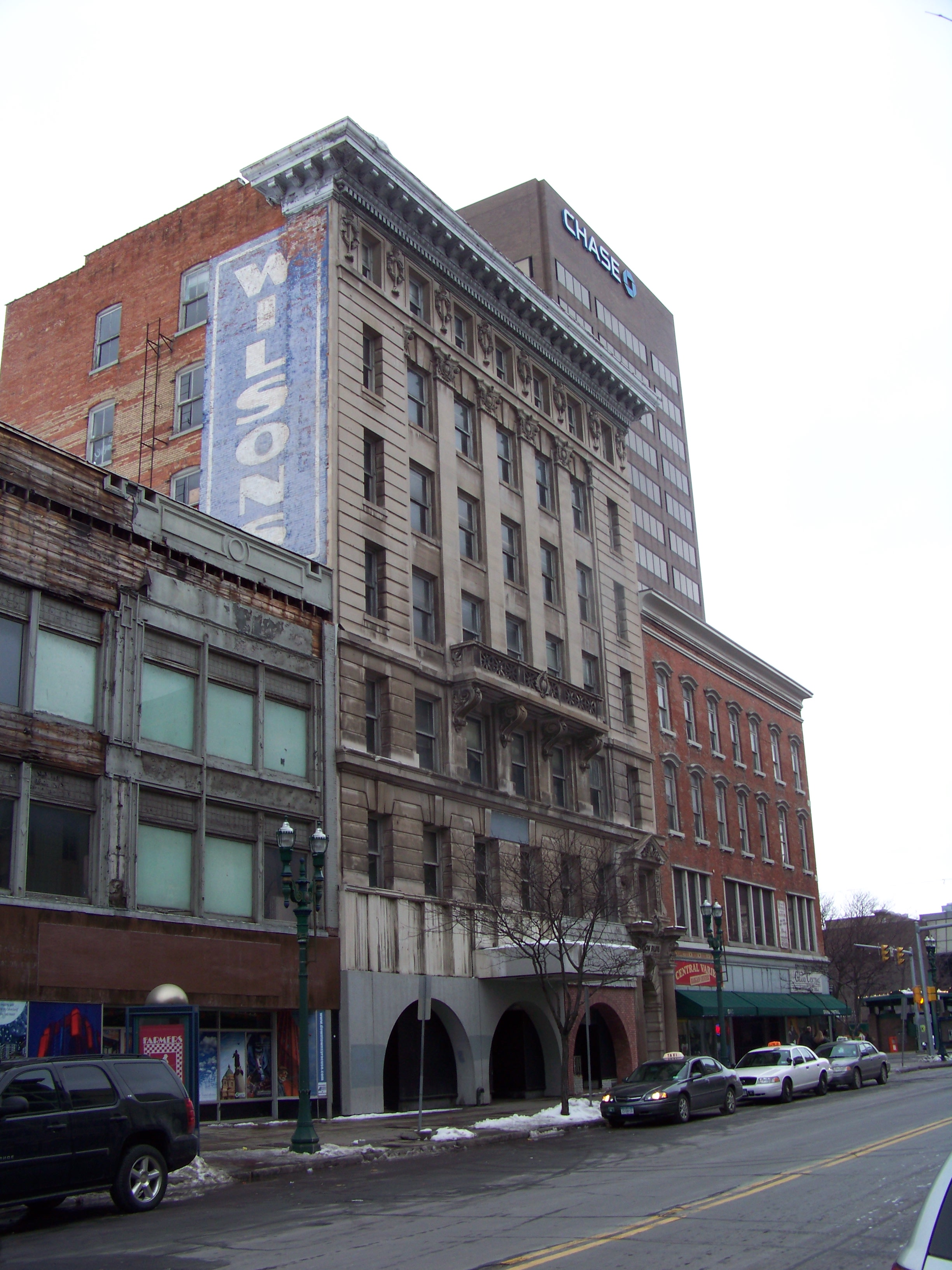
- Wilson Building

- Location within New York
- Location: 200, 300, & E. side of 400 blocks of Warren, 205-209 Jefferson, 400 blk. & 500-550 S. Salina Sts, Syracuse, New York
- Coordinates: 43.04791°N 76.15225°W
- Area: 9.3 acres (3.8 ha)
- NRHP reference No.: 09000832 (original); 14000193 (increase)
- Added to NRHP: October 16, 2009 boundary increase May 7, 2014

South Salina Street Downtown Historic District is a historic district in the United States, representing what was the commercial core of Syracuse, New York from the mid-nineteenth century to the mid-twentieth century. It was listed on the National Register of Historic Places on October 16, 2009. The vacancy rate in the district is high, and some buildings need extensive rehabilitation. Recent revitalization plans served as impetus for seeking listing on the National Register of Historic Places.

Originally it included the east side of the 200 block of South Salina Street, the entire 300 block and one building in the 400 block. This area had 22 contributing buildings and 3 non-contributing buildings. Among the contributing properties are two the White Memorial Building and the Loew's State Theater, also individually listed on the National Register of Historic Places. In 2014 its boundaries were increased to include some more side streets.

Architects represented in the district include Horatio Nelson White, Archimedes Russell, Charles E. Colton, Joseph Lyman Silsbee, Charles D. Wilsey and Thomas W. Lamb.

	Landmark name	Image	Date Built	Style	# of stories	Location	Description
1	White Memorial Building		1876	High Victorian Gothic	5	201 S. Salina Street	Multi-colored brick, Ohio sandstone, Onondaga limestone; mansard roof; gargoyles; Joseph Lyman Silsbee, architect
2	Salina Place		c. 1870		4	205 S. Salina Street	Three buildings with common cornice; southern building rebuilt 1914
3	McCarthy Building		1894	Italian Renaissance Revival	7	217 S. Salina Street	Beige brick; bracketed eaves; decorative lintels; Charles E. Colton, architect
4	Woolworth Building		1941	Art Deco	2	301 S. Salina Street	Tile and brick; flat roof
5	Dollarwise Building		1856; 1915	Federal	5	313-315 S. Salina Street	Brick; medallion supported eaves
6	Label Shopper Building		c. 1915		5	317-319 S. Salina Street	Steel framed; brick; bracketed eaves; decorative details
7	Park-Brannock Building		c. 1856	Italianate	5	321 S. Salina Street	Modernized 1930s; clad in cast stone; housed shoe store where Brannock device for measuring feet was manufactured
8	Lee's Express		19th century	Italianate, facade covered	5	323 S. Salina Street	Brick; historic material covered
9	Peatfield Building		c. 1900		5	325 S. Salina Street	Marble facade; sculptural figures; formerly Syracuse Trust Company and Marine Midland Bank
10	Lerners Building		Early 20th century		5	327-329 S. Salina Street	Masonry; white tile; modernized 1950s
12	Dey Brothers Building		1893	Italian Renaissance Revival	6	401 S. Salina Street	Grey brick; terra cotta trim; decorative cornice and parapet; Archimedes Russell, architect
14	Mason Building		1899	Italian Renaissance Revival	6	128 E. Genesee Street	Brick; keystone window lintels; large pilasters; floral decorated frieze; bracketed cornice
15	Witherill Building		1855	Italianate	4	300-304 S. Salina Street	Brick; Syracuse High School 1856-1861; Bryant & Stratton 1870s & 1880s; Henry Pike, architect
16	Wilson Building		1898	Beaux Arts	7	306-312 S. Salina Street	Brick and cast stone; bracketed balcony; copper cornice; originally known as the Dillaye Memorial Building; Charles E. Colton, architect
17	Bond Building (originally part of the Butler Block - separated c. 1920)		c. 1878, c. 1920		3	320-324 S. Salina Street	Double width; flat roof; copper sheathing; Horatio Nelson White, architect; later modifications by Charles D. Wilsey
19	Betts Building (originally part of the Butler Block - separated c. 1920)		c. 1878, c. 1920		3	320-324 S. Salina Street	Masonry; flat roof; classical detailing; large pilasters; Horatio Nelson White, architect
18	Nu-Look Building (originally part of the Butler Block - separated c. 1920)		c. 1878, c. 1920		3	326 S. Salina Street	Flat roof; copper sheathing; simple parapet; Horatio Nelson White, architect; later modifications by Charles D. Wilsey
20	Loew's State Theater (a.k.a. Landmark Theatre)		1928		8	362-374 S. Salina Street	Masonry and light stone; three-story arched window above marquee; 21 storefronts, 160 offices; 3,300-seat theater; individually listed 1977; designed by Thomas W. Lamb

== See also ==
- South Salina Street Historic District, also NRHP-listed, further down the same street
- National Register of Historic Places listings in Syracuse, New York
