= Charles Erastus Colton =

American architect (1847–1914)

- Born: November 12, 1847; Syracuse, New York, United States
- Died: July 18, 1914 (aged 66); Syracuse, New York, United States
- Occupation: Architect

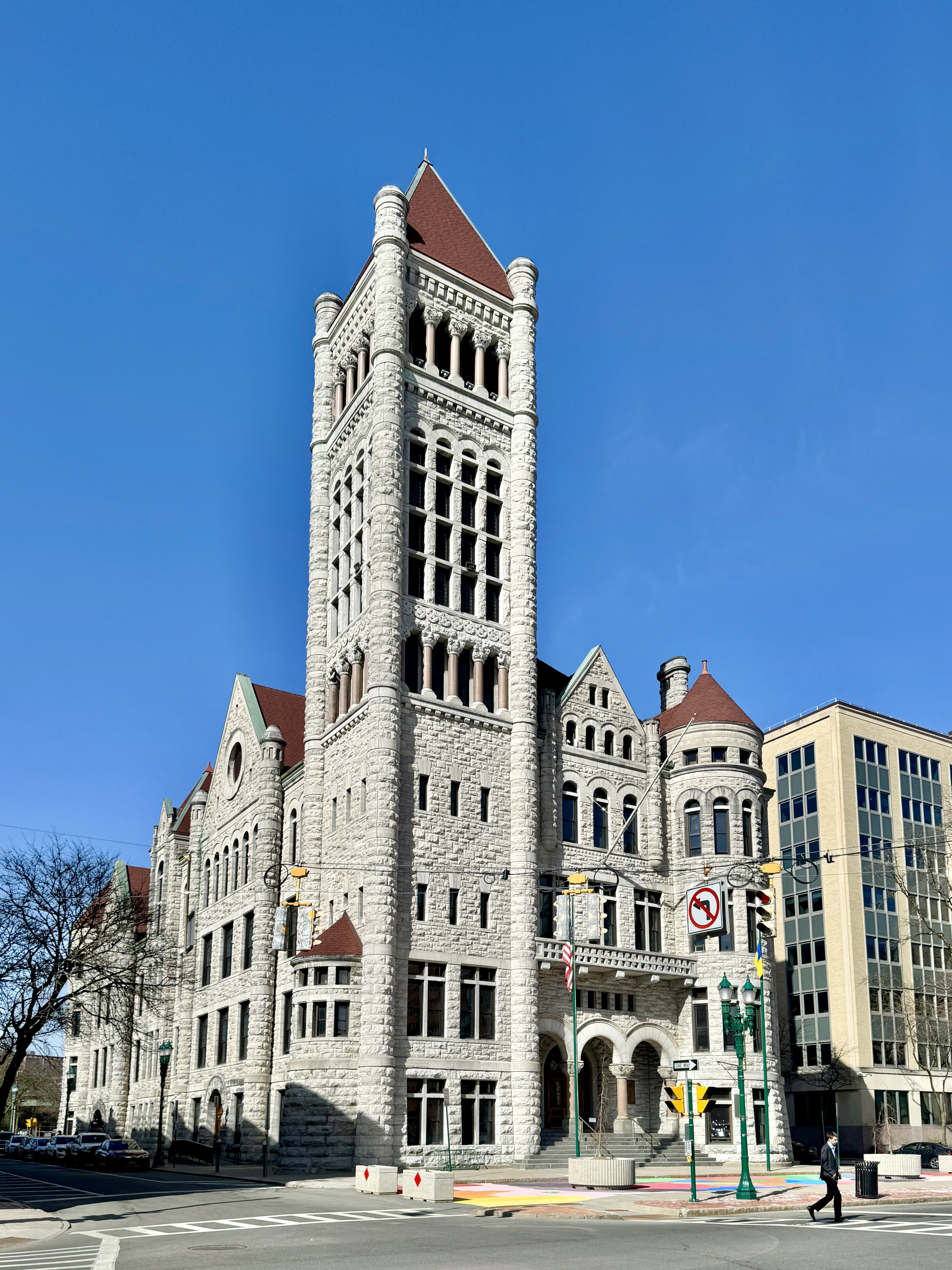
The Syracuse City Hall, designed in the Richardsonian Romanesque style and completed in 1892

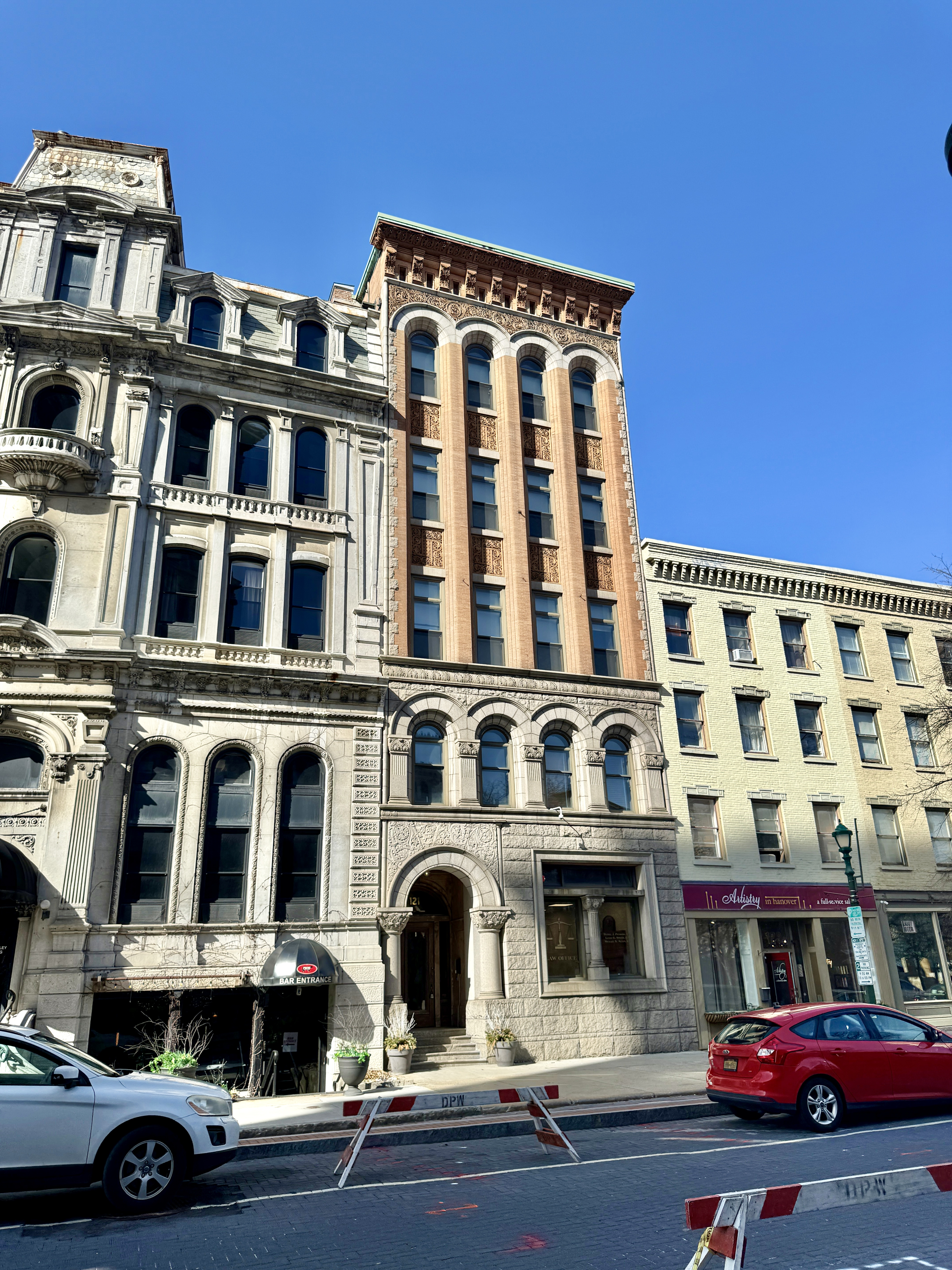
The Gere Bank Building in Syracuse, designed in the Richardsonian Romanesque style and completed in 1894

Charles Erastus Colton (November 12, 1847 – July 18, 1914) was an American architect who worked in Syracuse, New York, from 1878 until his death in 1914.

== Life and career ==
Charles Erastus Colton was born November 12, 1847, in Syracuse to Calvin Colton, a lumber merchant, and Susan E. Colton, née Nottingham. He was educated in the Syracuse public school and claimed to have graduated from Syracuse High School in 1861 but is not included on any lists of graduates. He followed several trades until 1875, when, having chosen to join the architectural profession, entered the office of Archimedes Russell, a leading local architect. In 1878 he opened an office of his own and practiced independently until his death in 1914.

Colton is best remembered as architect of the Syracuse City Hall (1892, NRHP-listed) and the Gere Bank Building (1894, NRHP-listed), both notable local examples of the Richardsonian Romanesque style. When he died, the local press hailed him as the leading architect of Syracuse, surpassing Russell.

== Personal life ==
Colton was active in local Republican party affairs; he was offered the office of state architect by governor David B. Hill but refused it. He was married in 1867 to Anna A. Van Buskirk; they had three children, all daughters. He died July 18, 1914, at home in Syracuse at the age of 66.

== Architectural works ==
- 1879: Howard & Jennings Pump Manufactory, Syracuse, New York
- 1881: St. John's Episcopal Church, Auburn, New York
  - This church later merged with St. Peter's; as of 2026 the St. John's building is a venue known as The Center
- 1891: Kirk Building, Syracuse, New York
  - Known also as the Kirk Fireproof Building and Kirk Block and later as the City Bank Building; demolished
- 1892: Syracuse City Hall, Syracuse, New York
  - Controversy during construction caused Colton to be removed as architect prior to completion; NRHP-listed
- 1894: Gere Bank Building, Syracuse, New York
  - NRHP-listed
- 1894: McCarthy Building, Syracuse, New York
  - Contributes to the NRHP-listed South Salina Street Downtown Historic District
- 1895: Hogan Block, Syracuse, New York
  - Contributes to the NRHP-listed Armory Square Historic District
- 1897: Baldwinsville Village Hall, Baldwinsville, New York
  - NRHP-listed
- 1898: Wilson Building, Syracuse, New York
  - Contributes to the NRHP-listed South Salina Street Downtown Historic District
- 1905: Iroquois China Company plant, Solvay, New York
- 1905: Pedestal, Gustavus Sniper monument, Schlosser Park, Syracuse, New York
  - Frederick Moynihan, sculptor
- 1908: Homer Town Hall, Homer, New York
- 1911: People's African Methodist Episcopal Zion Church, Syracuse, New York
  - Wallace Rayfield, as architect to the national African Methodist Episcopal Zion Church, may have consulted on the design; NRHP-listed
- 1912: First United Methodist Church, Homer, New York
- 1912: Leavenworth Apartments, Syracuse, New York
  - NRHP-listed
