= St. Luke AME Zion Church =

Historic church in Alabama, United States

- U.S. National Register of Historic Places
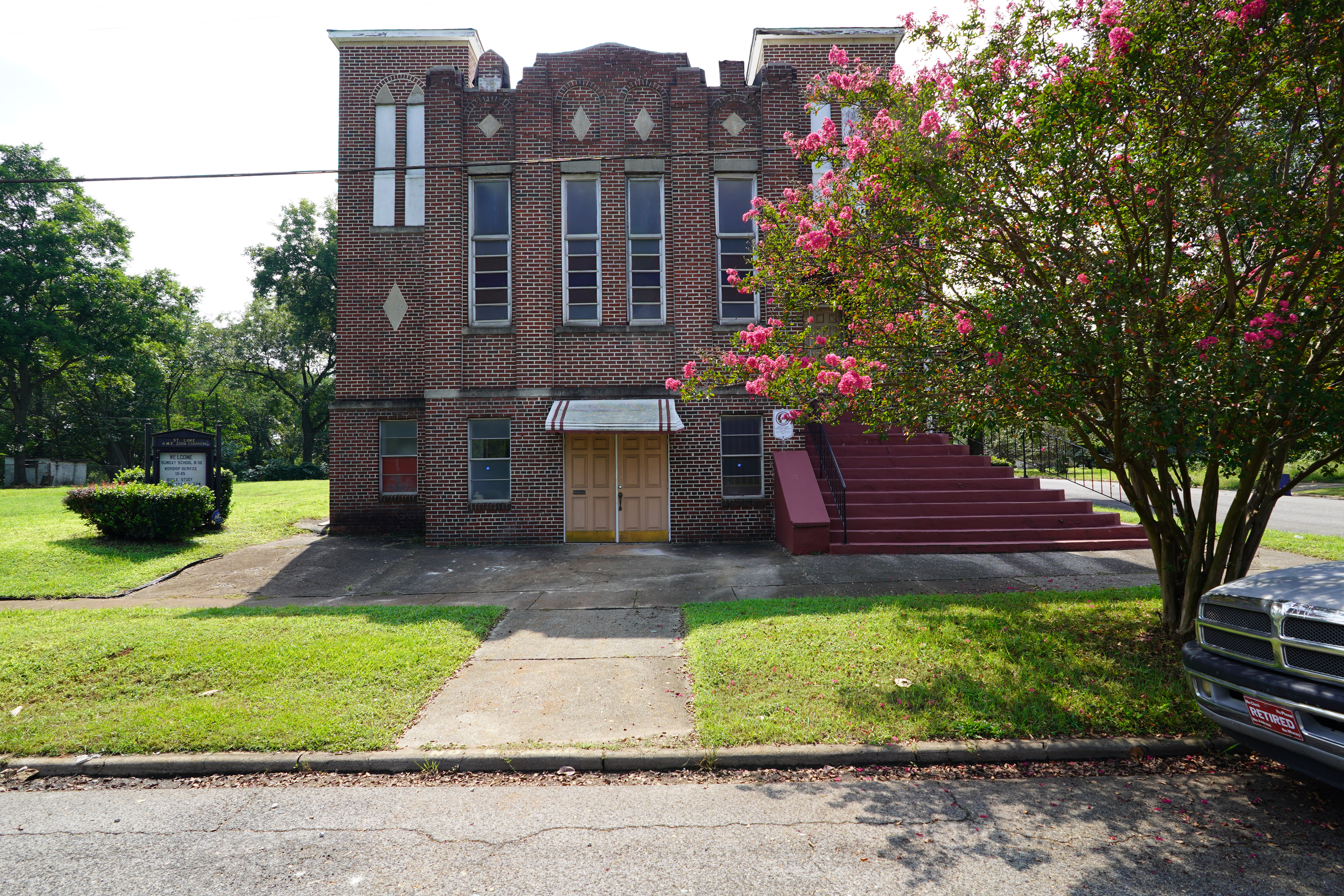

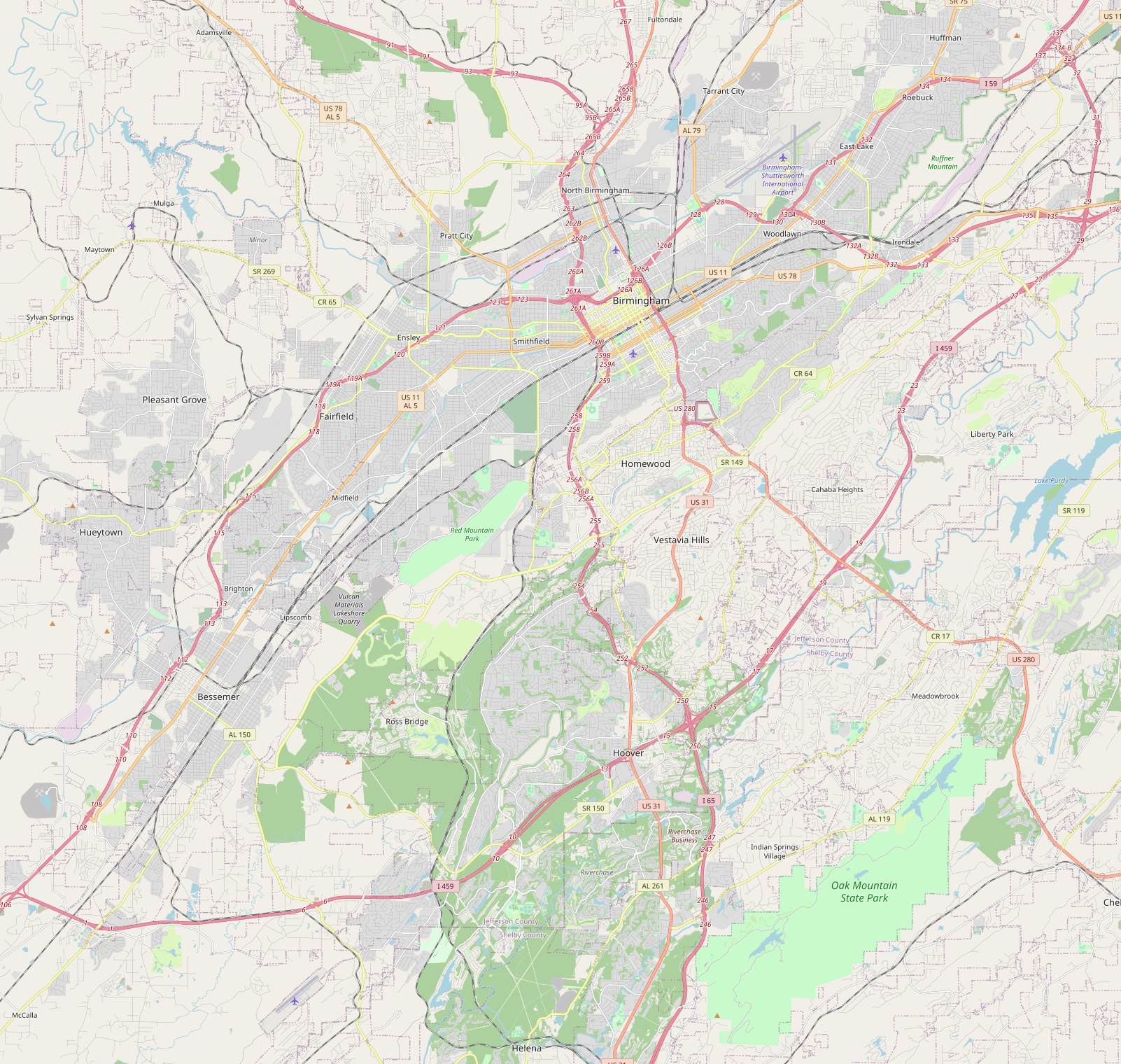
- Location within Birmingham, Alabama Location within Alabama Location within the United States
- Location: 3937 12th Ave. N Birmingham, Alabama
- Coordinates: 33°32′34″N 86°46′51″W
- Area: less than one acre
- Built: 1930
- Architectural style: Gothic Revival
- MPS: Civil Rights Movement in Birmingham, Alabama MPS
- NRHP reference No.: 05000295
- Added to NRHP: April 22, 2005

St. Luke AME Zion Church is a historic African Methodist Episcopal Zion (AMEZ) church at 3937 12th Ave. North in Birmingham, Alabama. The congregation was established in 1878 and the current building was constructed in 1930. It was significant in the civil rights movement., in part because it, along with two neighboring churches which no longer stand were bombed on January 16, 1962. It was added to the National Register of Historic Places in 2005.

== See also ==
- St. Luke AME Church - also in Birmingham, also significant in the civil rights movement, and also added to the NRHP in 2005
