= Syracuse City Hall =

- U.S. National Register of Historic Places
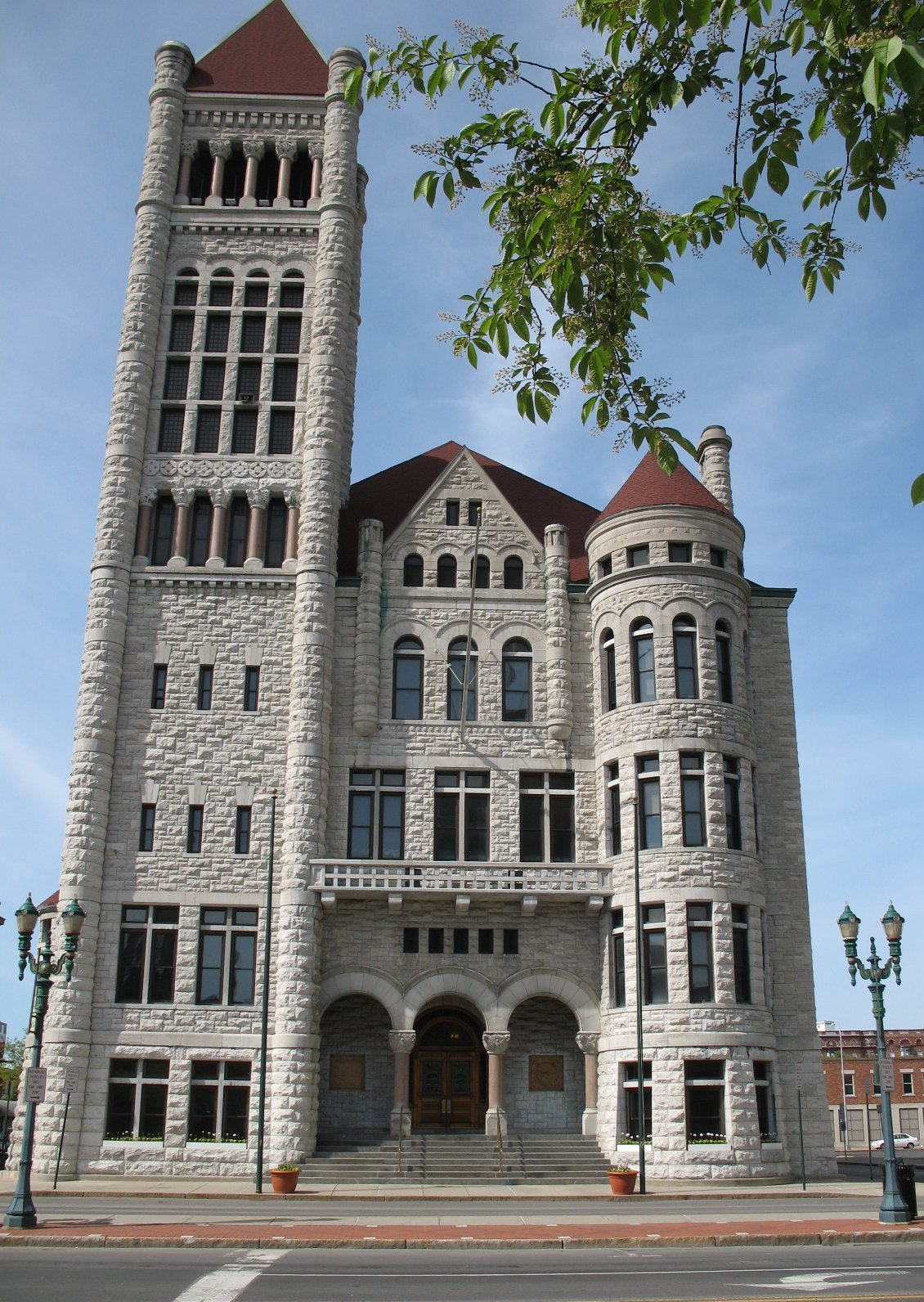

- Location within New York Location within the United States
- Location: 233 E. Washington St., Syracuse, New York
- Coordinates: 43°3′0″N 76°8′57″W
- Area: 0.5 acres (0.20 ha)
- Built: 1889; 137 years ago
- Architect: Charles Erastus Colton
- Architectural style: Romanesque Revival
- NRHP reference No.: 76001259
- Added to NRHP: August 27, 1976

The Syracuse City Hall is the city hall of Syracuse, New York.

Unusually for civic buildings in the United States, it was constructed from 1889 to 1893 in the Romanesque Revival architectural style. The bid accepted for the construction was for $238,750.00 from Hughes Brothers of Syracuse.

== Gallery ==
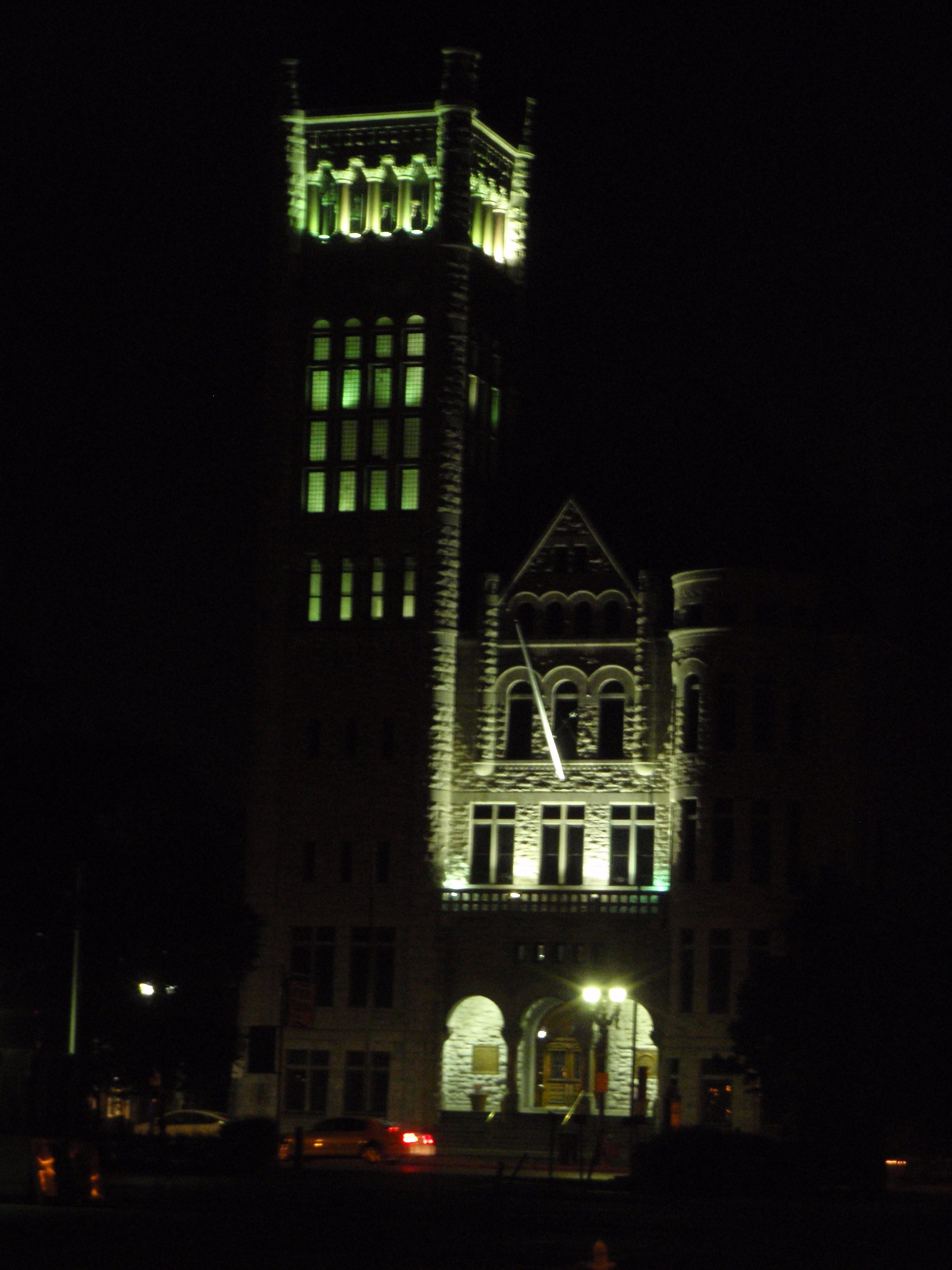
Night view of Syracuse City hall.

== See also ==
- National Register of Historic Places listings in Syracuse, New York
