= Amos Block =

Historic commercial building in New York, United States

- The Amos Block
- U.S. National Register of Historic Places
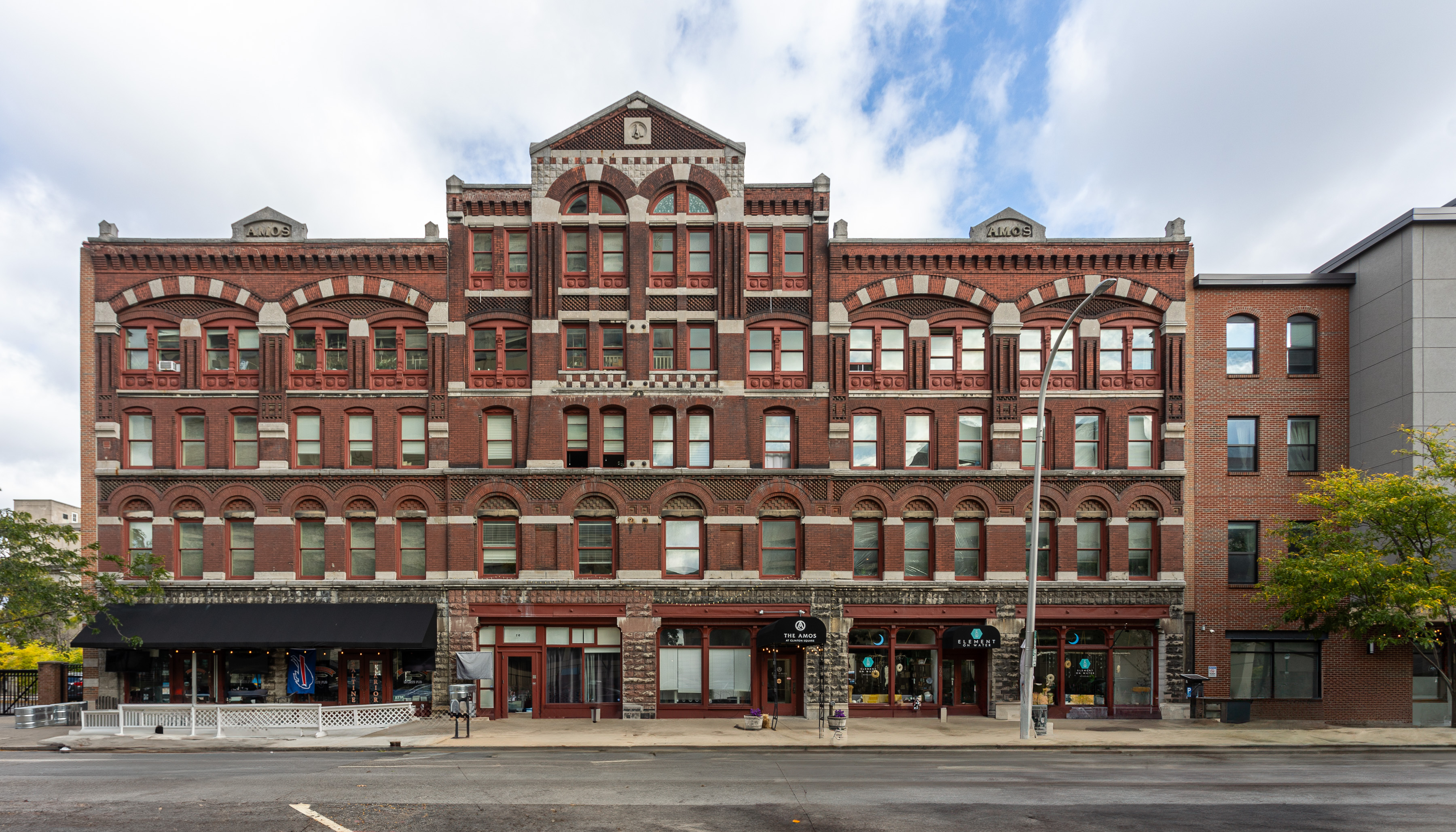
- Note the brick extension at right

- Location within New York Location within the United States
- Location: Syracuse, New York
- Coordinates: 43°3′2.7″N 76°9′15.6″W
- Built: 1878
- Architect: Joseph Lyman Silsbee
- Architectural style: Romanesque Revival
- NRHP reference No.: 78001890
- Added to NRHP: November 16, 1978

The Amos Block is a Romanesque Revival building located on the southwest corner of Clinton Square in Downtown Syracuse, New York.

== History ==
The building's developer and namesake, Jacob Amos, served as mayor of Syracuse from 1892 to 1896. Originally, the Erie Canal ran directly behind the Amos Block, and goods were loaded and unloaded from the building's upper levels onto the Canal, while the first floor on the West Water St side contained a retail grocer. The building was added to the National Register of Historic Places in 1978.

In 2006, the Amos Block was renovated, and was renamed "The Amos." The building continued to serve as a multi-purpose structure, with retail (including, once again, a grocery store) on the first floor, and residential apartments on the upper floors.

A sports pub opened in the building in 2011.

A $3.7 million, four-story addition was built in 2016, with 19 apartments in the top three stories and retail space at street level. The addition was designed with a modern brick and stucco look.

A 1,250-square-foot ice cream parlor opened on the first floor in 2018.

== See also ==
- National Register of Historic Places listings in Syracuse, New York
