= Baldwinsville Village Hall =

- U.S. National Register of Historic Places
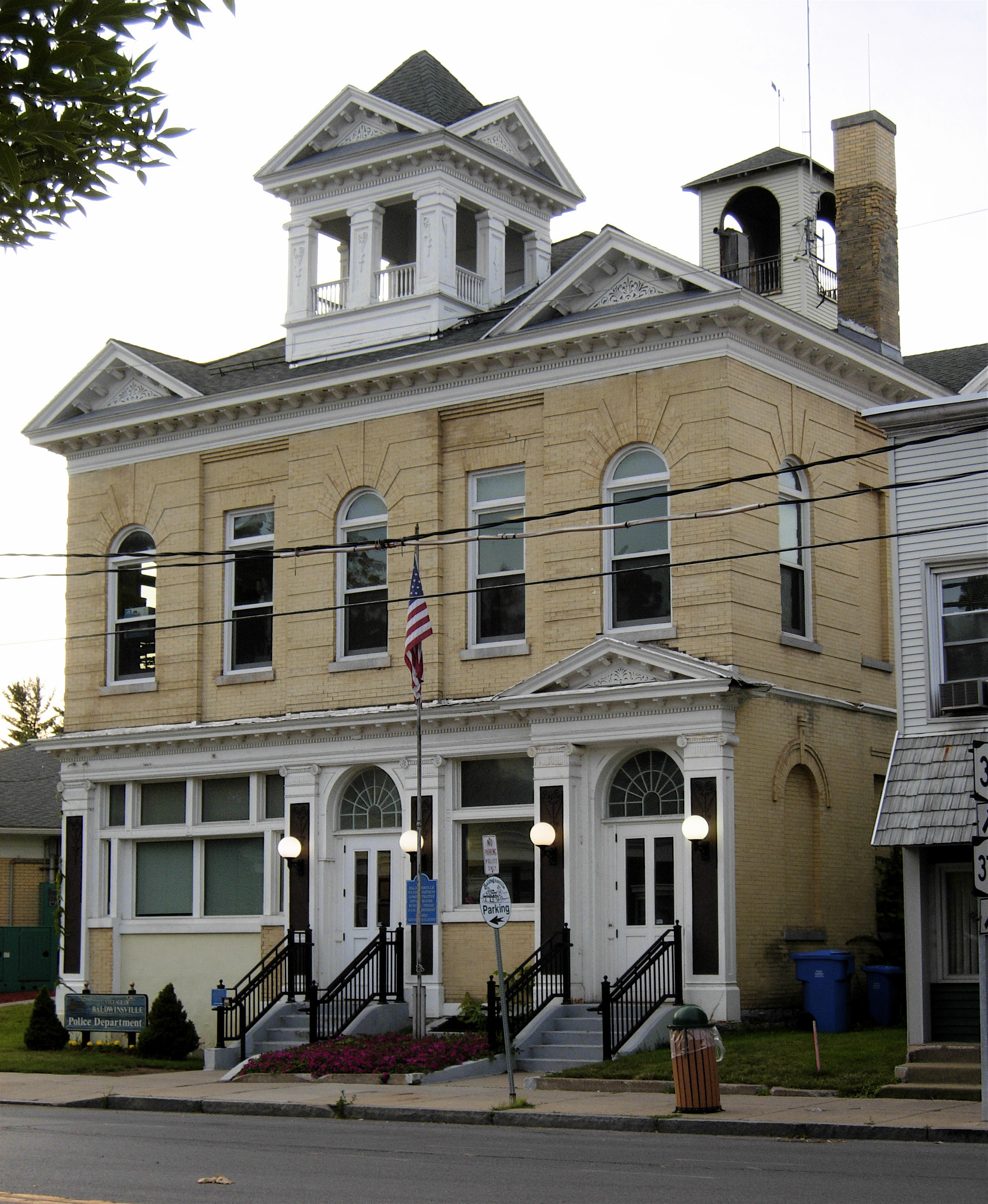

- Location within New York Location within the United States
- Location: 16 W. Genesee St., Baldwinsville, New York
- Coordinates: 43°9′31.72″N 76°20′3.22″W
- Built: 1897
- Architect: Charles E. Colton
- Architectural style: Renaissance
- NRHP reference No.: 97000421
- Added to NRHP: May 9, 1997

Baldwinsville Village Hall, in Baldwinsville, New York is a Renaissance Revival style village hall that was listed in the National Register of Historic Places in 1997. It was designed by architect Charles E. Colton and was built by G.W. Van Dusen and others in 1897.
