= White Memorial Building (Syracuse, New York) =

- U.S. National Register of Historic Places
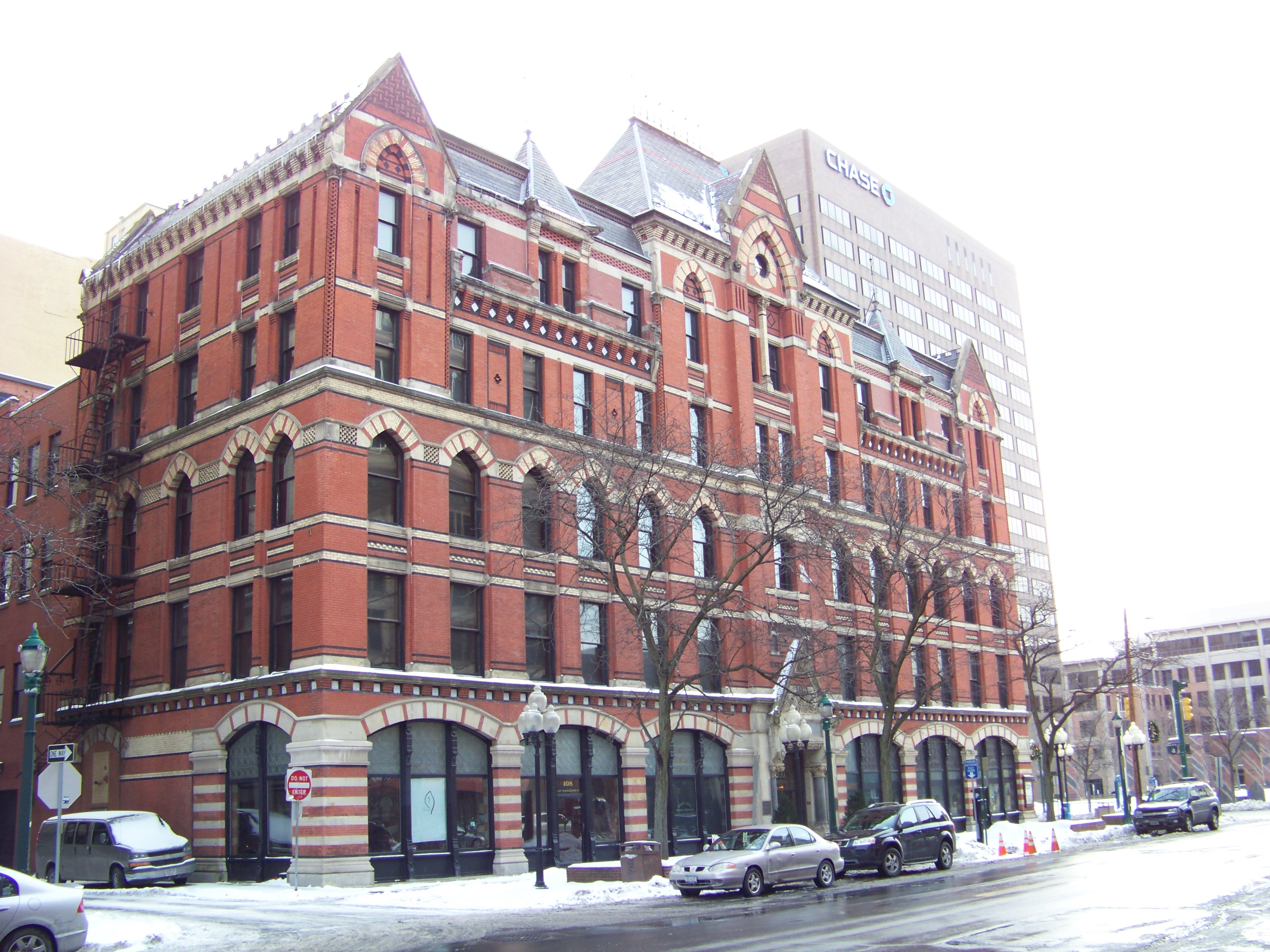

- Location within New York Location within the United States
- Interactive map showing the location of White Memorial Building
- Location: 106 E. Washington St., Syracuse, New York
- Coordinates: 43°2′57.73″N 76°9′6.48″W
- Built: 1876
- Architect: Joseph Lyman Silsbee
- Architectural style: Gothic
- NRHP reference No.: 73001237
- Added to NRHP: February 6, 1973

The White Memorial Building is a Gothic-style building prominently located on the main downtown street of Syracuse, New York. It was designed by Joseph Lyman Silsbee.

== Description ==
It is built primarily of Ohio sandstone blocks and red brick, plus Onondaga limestone along the base. Lines of cement were black, and there are occasional lines of black brick, providing "sharp dissimilatudes" which are "yet exceedingly pleasant to the eye", according to an 1876 review. The style is Gothic overall, though the roof is termed French.

== The White family ==
The Whites were a prominent local family which included financier and railroad magnate Horace White (1802-1860), his wife Clara Dickson White, and their sons Andrew Dickson White, co-founder of Cornell University, and Horace Keep White. The White family owned the Syracuse National Bank, whose building was the largest in Syracuse at the time, and also designed by Silsbee.

The White Memorial Building was commissioned by Horace K. and Andrew Dickson White and dedicated to the family patriarch Asa White (b.1774). Andrew in particular had a keen interest in architecture and worked closely with Silsbee on the building, modeling it after buildings in Manchester, England.

== Gallery ==
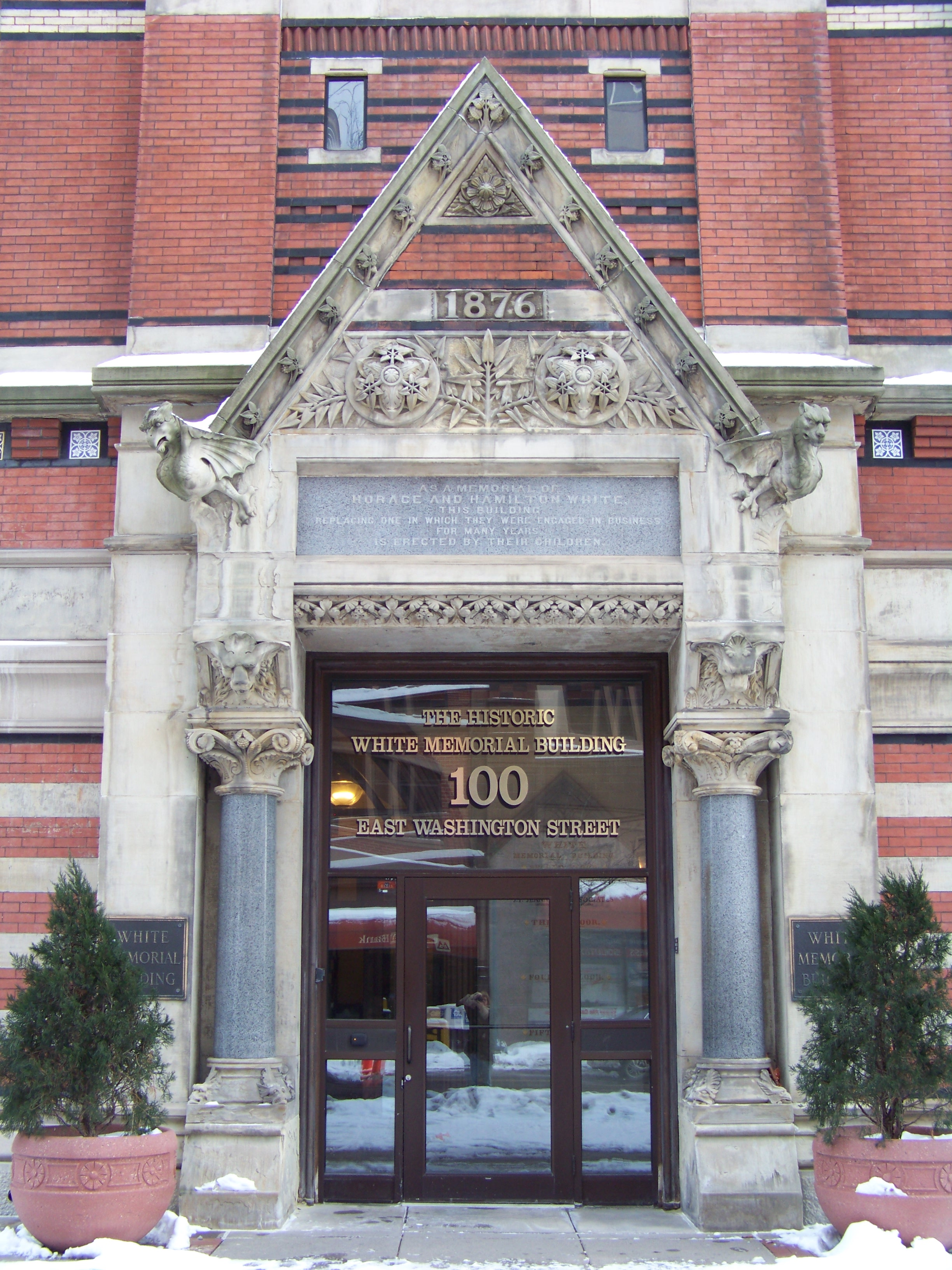
Entrance

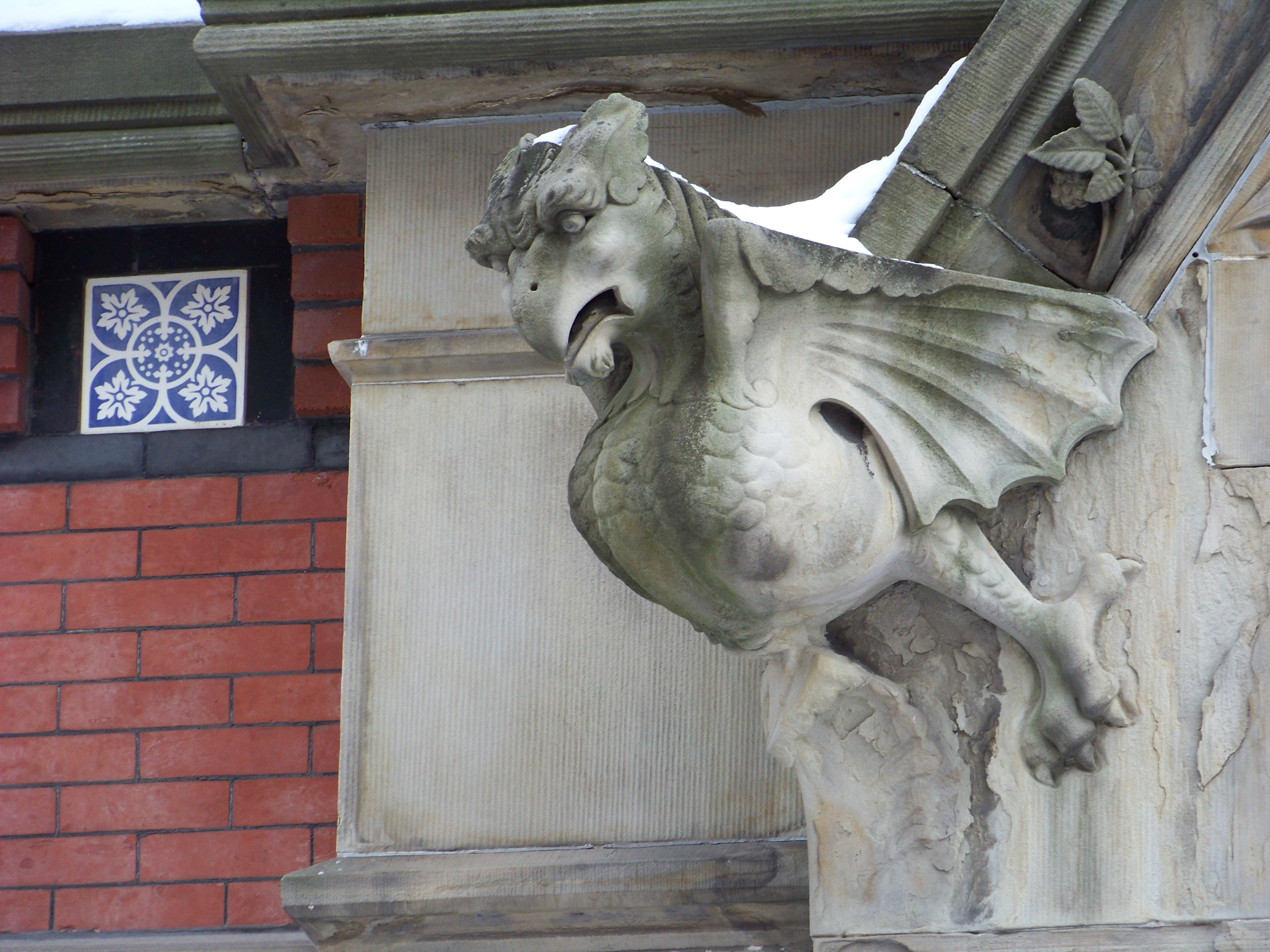
Sculpture and tile details

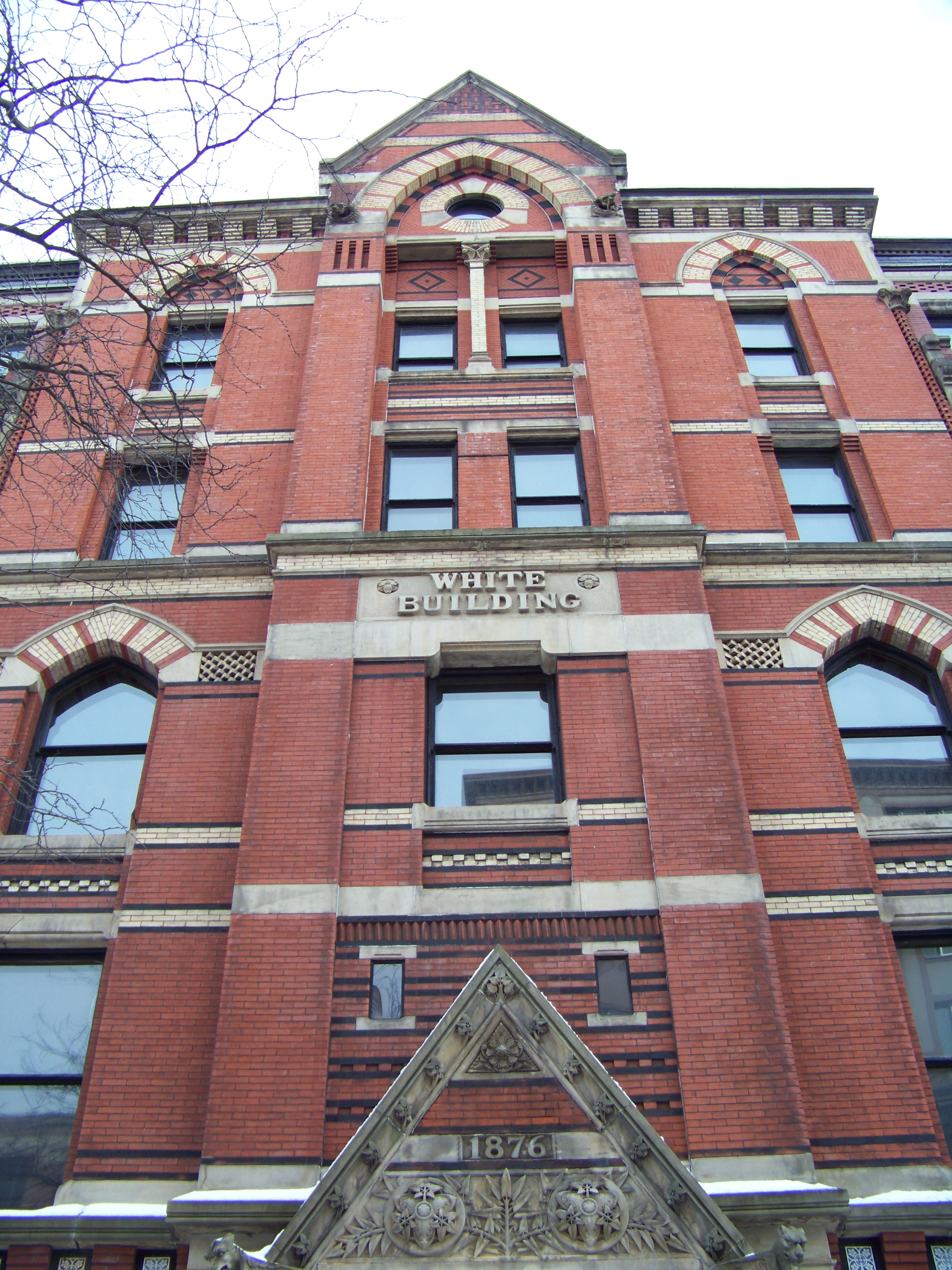
View from the street up above the entrance
