= St. Luke AME Church =

Historic church in Alabama, United States

- U.S. National Register of Historic Places
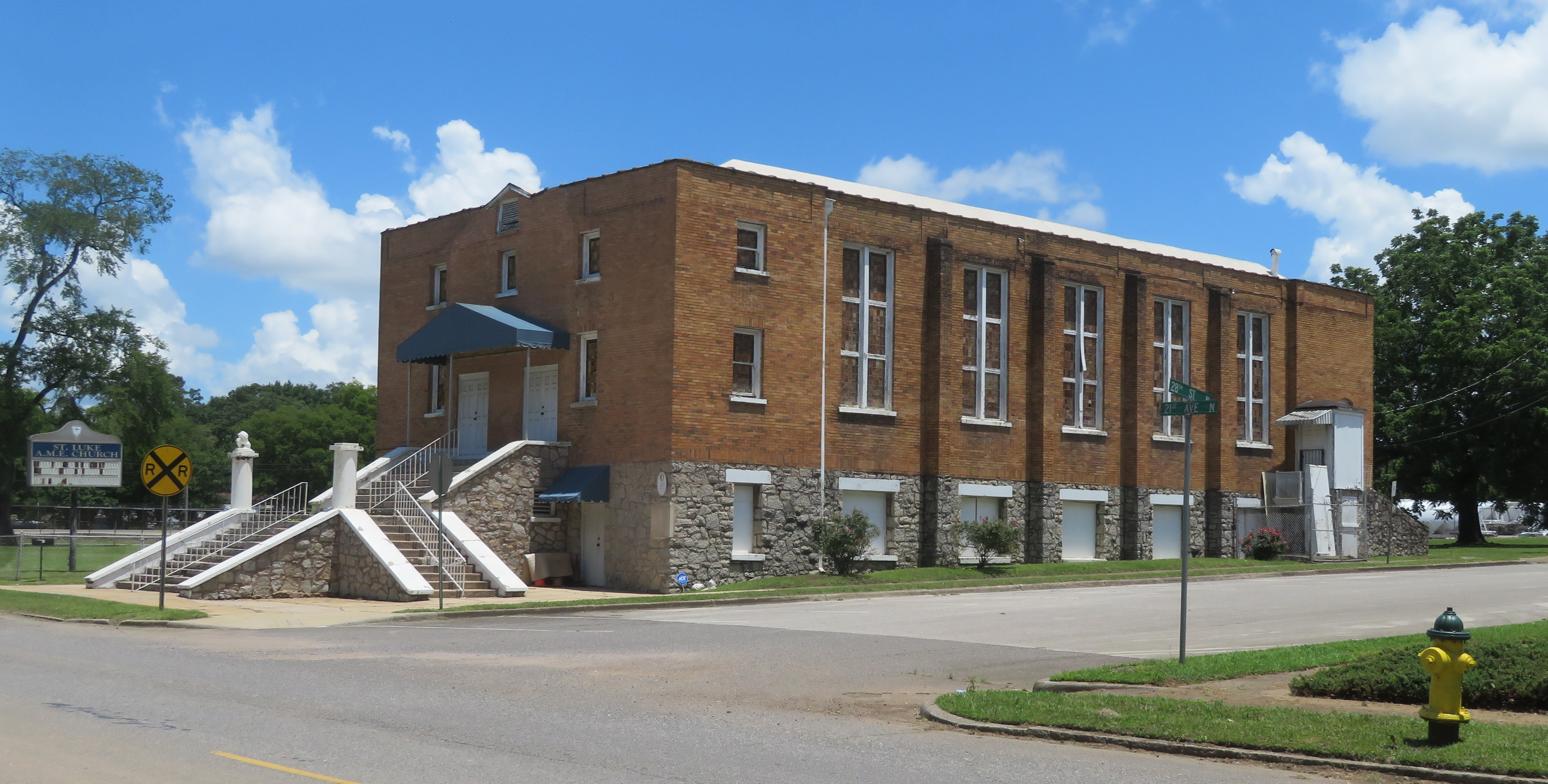

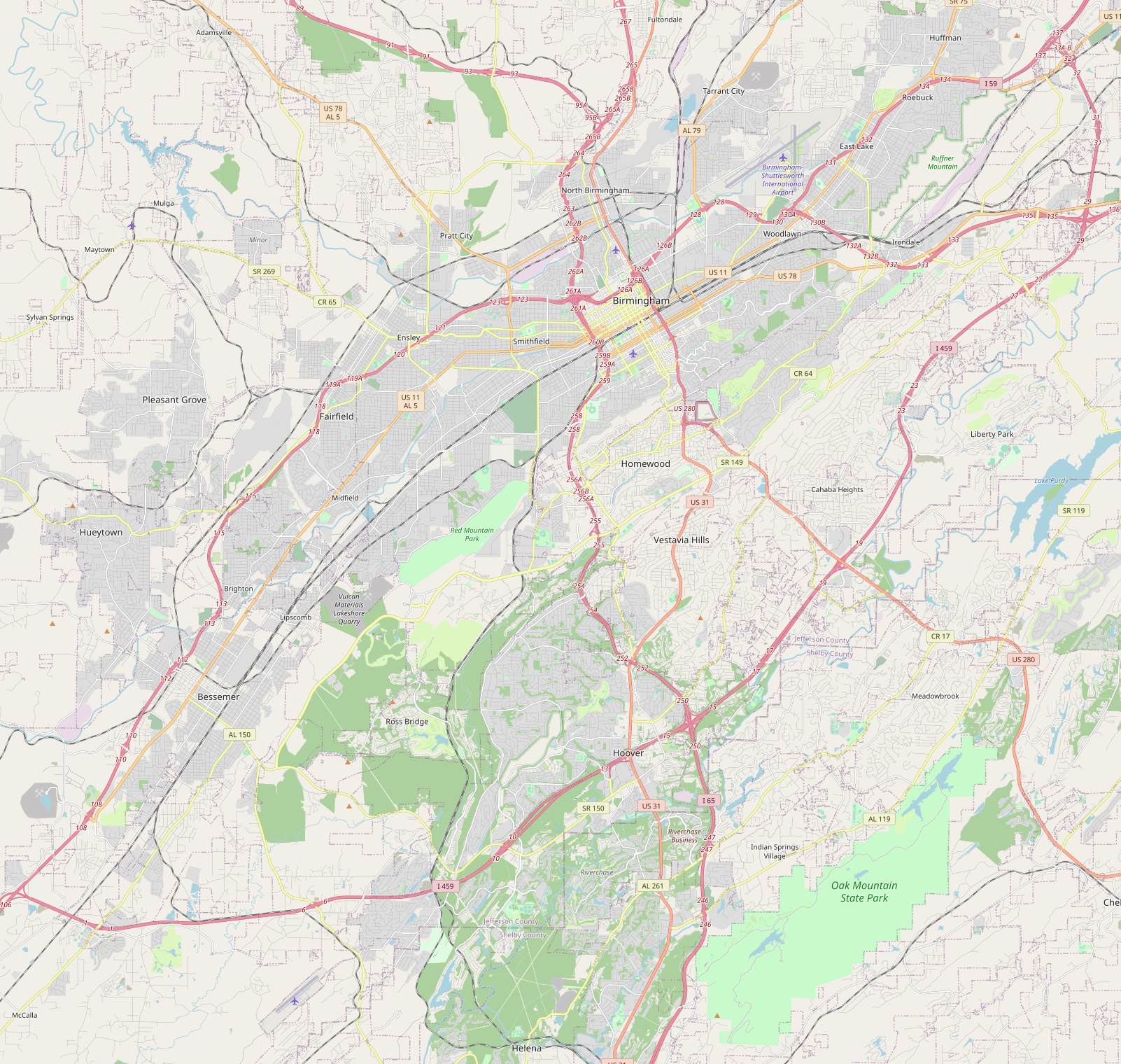
- Location within Birmingham, Alabama Location within Alabama Location within the United States
- Location: 2803 21st Ave. N, Birmingham, Alabama
- Coordinates: 33°32′33″N 86°48′36″W
- Area: 2 acres (0.81 ha)
- Built: 1926
- Architect: Wallace Rayfield
- Architectural style: Gothic Revival
- MPS: Civil Rights Movement in Birmingham, Alabama MPS
- NRHP reference No.: 05000296
- Added to NRHP: April 22, 2005

St. Luke AME Church is a historic African Methodist Episcopal church at 2803 21st Avenue North in Birmingham, Alabama. The congregation was established in 1886. Its current building was designed by the pioneering African American Architect Wallace Rayfield. It was built in 1926 and added to the National Register of Historic Places in 2005. The church was significant in the civil rights movement.

== See also ==
- St. Luke AME Zion Church - also in Birmingham, also significant in the civil rights movement, and also added to the NRHP in 2005
