= People's African Methodist Episcopal Zion Church =

Historic church in New York, United States

- U.S. National Register of Historic Places
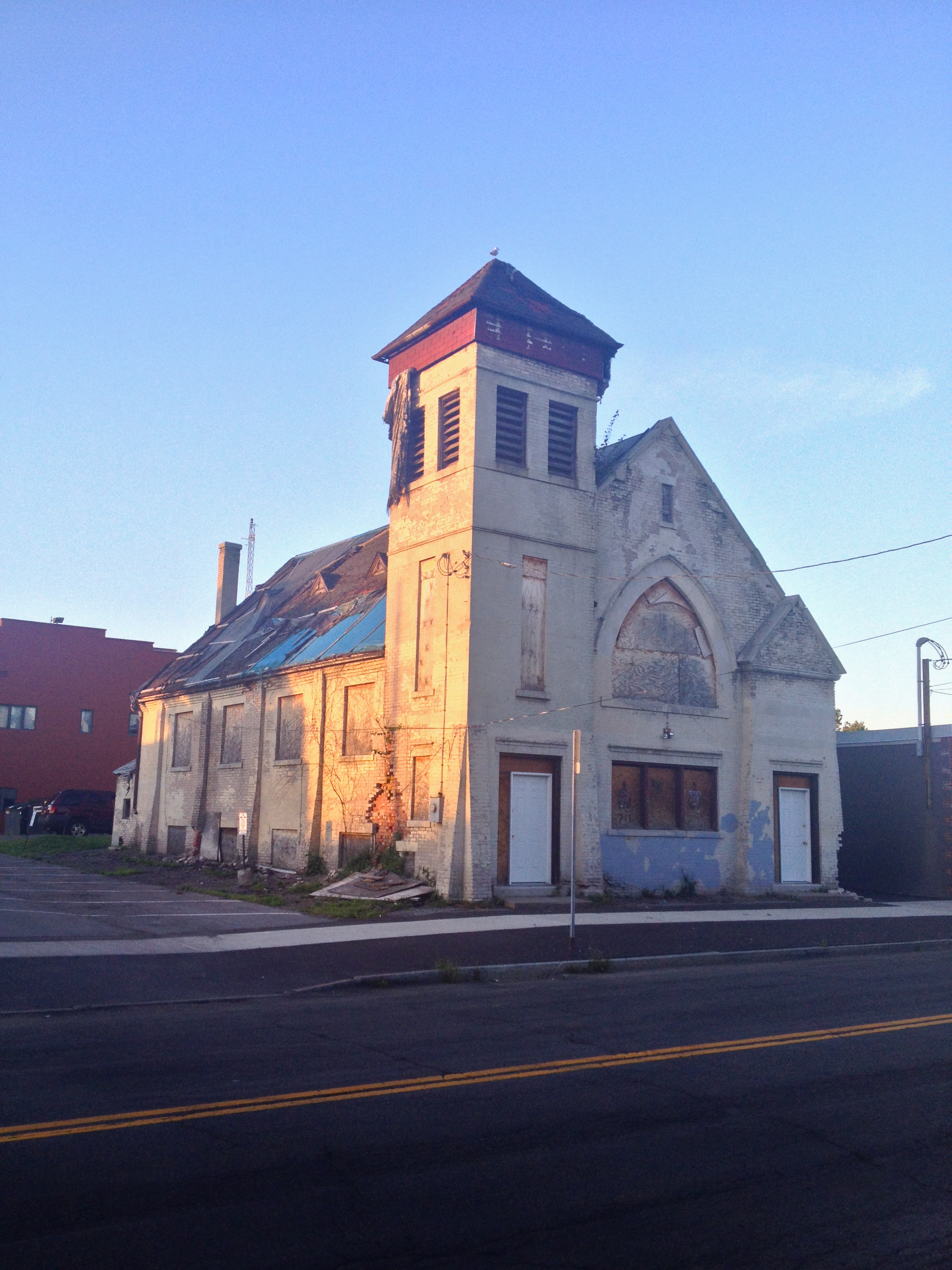
- Former building for People's African Methodist Episcopal Zion Church, August 2014

- Location within New York Location within the United States
- Location: 711 E. Fayette St., Syracuse, New York
- Coordinates: 43°02′56″N 76°08′28″W
- Area: Less than 1 acre (0.40 ha)
- Built: 1911
- Architect: Colton, Charles E.; Rayfield, Wallace
- Architectural style: Gothic Revival
- NRHP reference No.: 11001024
- Added to NRHP: January 17, 2012

People's African Methodist Episcopal Zion Church is a historic African Methodist Episcopal Zion church located in Downtown Syracuse, Onondaga County, New York. It was designed by architect Charles Erastus Colton and Wallace Rayfield and built in 1911. It is a small Gothic Revival style stuccoed brick building. It sits on a cut limestone foundation and measures approximately 25 feet wide and 50 feet deep. It has a two-story projecting front gable and features a three-story bell tower topped by a pyramidal roof. The congregation was incorporated in 1837 and remained at this location until 1976.

It was listed on the National Register of Historic Places in 2012.
