= Unity Chapel =

Chapel in Wyoming, Wisconsin

- U.S. National Register of Historic Places
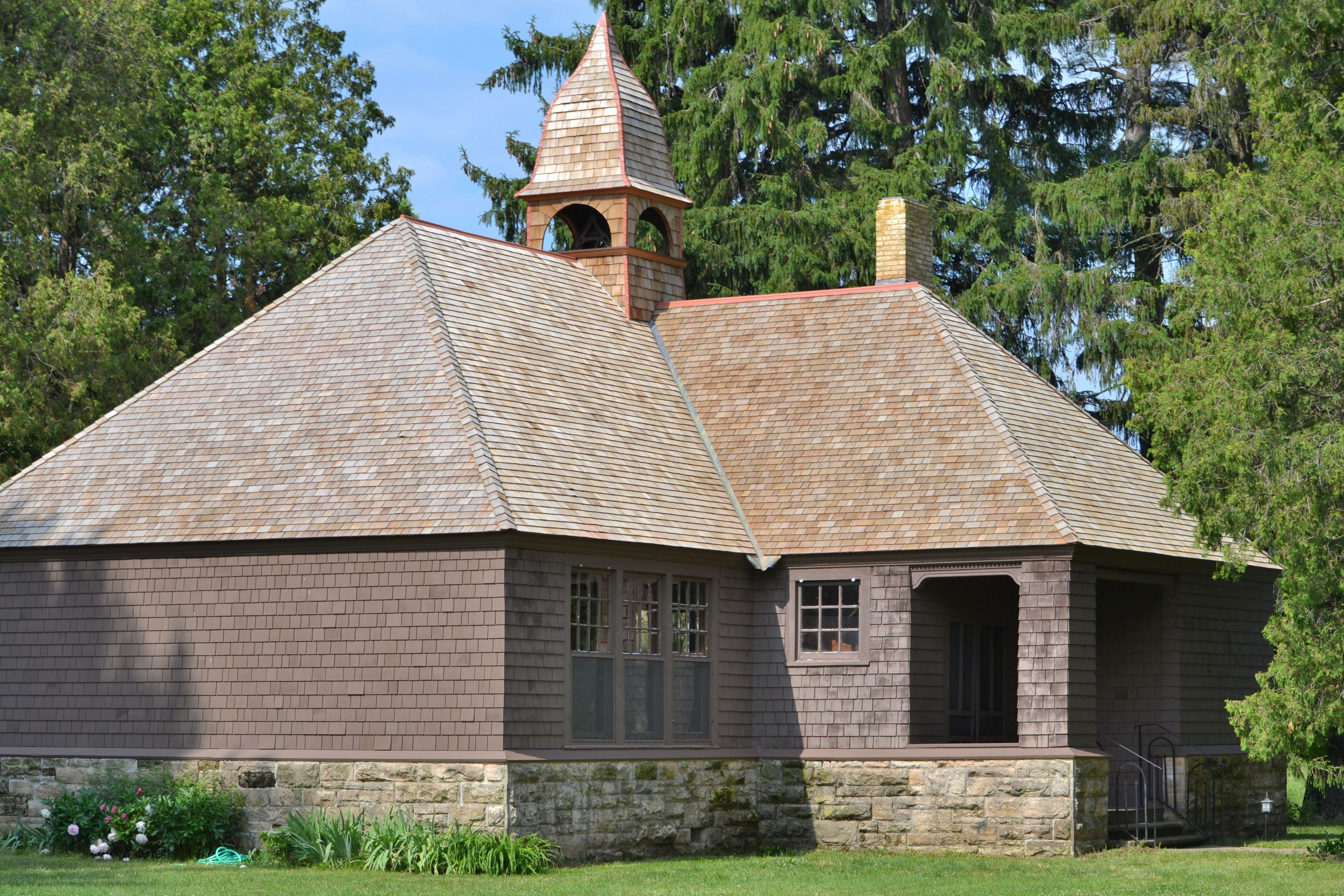

- Location within Wisconsin Location within the United States
- Interactive map showing the location of Unity Chapel
- Location: Spring Green, Wisconsin
- Coordinates: 43°07′57″N 90°03′41″W
- Built: 1886
- Architect: Joseph Lyman Silsbee; Frank Lloyd Wright
- Architectural style: Shingle Style
- NRHP reference No.: 74000092
- Added to NRHP: July 18, 1974

The Unity Chapel is located in the town of Wyoming in Iowa County, Wisconsin, United States. It was added to the National Register of Historic Places in 1974.

== History ==
Unity Chapel was designed in Joseph Lyman Silsbee's Chicago architectural office in 1886. Silsbee was one of the leading practitioners of Shingle style architecture in the Midwest and designed the chapel as a simple execution of this style. Although not officially in the employ of Silsbee, eighteen-year-old Frank Lloyd Wright "looked after the interior." This makes the chapel Wright's earliest known work. The chapel was designed for Wright's uncle, Jenkin Lloyd Jones, to serve as a private chapel for his surrounding Lloyd Jones relatives; Jones had commissioned Silsbee to design his All Souls Church in Chicago the previous year. The chapel grounds include a cemetery for the family, including the grave of famous Hollywood actress Anne Baxter.

After Unity Chapel was built, Wright moved to Chicago and joined the employ of Silsbee.

The building was recognized by the National Park Service with a listing on the National Register of Historic Places on July 18, 1974.

== Architecture ==
The chapel is a small building shaped in a reversed "L"; the short leg points north and the long leg points east. The short leg operated as an entryway and the long leg is the main chapel hall. The hipped roof is steeply pitched and features a belfry at the intersection of the gables. The belfry is square with a bell-cast hipped roof. Each of its four sides has a semi-circular arched opening. Consistent with Shingle style design architecture, a layer of wood shingles covers both the roof and the exterior walls. Unity Chapel rests on a rock-faced stone foundation. Double-hung windows in groups of three are found on the north, south, and west walls. The upper sash has twelve lights and the lower sash is one large pane.

The chapel graveyard holds the remains of Wright's side of the family, the Lloyd Joneses. Wright himself was originally buried there, but his remains were moved to the grounds of his winter home, Taliesin West, in Arizona on the wishes of his widow following her death in 1985.

== See also ==
- List of Frank Lloyd Wright works
- National Register of Historic Places listings in Iowa County, Wisconsin
