= Joseph Lyman Silsbee =

American architect (1848–1913)

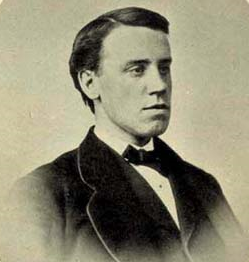
- Born: November 25, 1848; Salem, Massachusetts
- Died: January 31, 1913 (aged 64); Chicago, Illinois
- Education: Harvard; Massachusetts Institute of Technology
- Occupation: Architect
- Spouse: Anna Baldwin Sedgwick
- Awards: Peabody Medal (1894)
- Buildings: Lincoln Park Conservatory; Unity Chapel; Syracuse Savings Bank Building; White Memorial Building; Oakwood Cemetery Chapel; Falconwood Club
- Projects: Amos Block

Joseph Lyman Silsbee (November 25, 1848 – January 31, 1913) was a significant American architect during the 19th and early 20th centuries. He was well known for his facility of drawing and gift for designing buildings in a variety of styles. His most prominent works ran through Syracuse, Buffalo and Chicago. He was influential as mentor to a generation of architects, most notably architects of the Prairie School including the famous architect Frank Lloyd Wright.

== Early life ==
Joseph Lyman Silsbee was born on November 25, 1848, in Salem, Massachusetts. Silsbee graduated from Phillips Exeter Academy in 1865 and Harvard in 1869. In 1870, he became an early student of the first school of architecture in the United States at the Massachusetts Institute of Technology (MIT).

== Career ==
After graduating from Harvard and MIT, he served an apprenticeship with Boston architects William Robert Ware & Henry Van Brunt and William Ralph Emerson, respectively. Silsbee traveled around Europe before moving to Syracuse, New York in 1874. In 1875, he married Anna Baldwin Sedgwick, daughter of influential lawyer and politician Charles Baldwin Sedgwick. He had a prolific practice and at one point had three simultaneously operating offices. He had offices in Syracuse (1875–1885), Buffalo (Silsbee & Marling, 1882–1887), and Chicago (Silsbee and Kent, 1883–1884). From 1883 to 1885, his Syracuse office was a partnership with architect Ellis G. Hall. Silsbee's Chicago office had a number of architects who were later to become known in their own right, including:

- Frank Lloyd Wright
- George Grant Elmslie
- George W. Maher
- Irving J. Gill
- Henry G. Fiddelke

Silsbee was one of the first professors of architecture at Syracuse University, another one of the earliest schools of architecture in the nation. He was a founding member of the Chicago and Illinois Chapters of the American Institute of Architects. In 1894, Silsbee was awarded the Peabody Medal by the Franklin Institute for his design for a Moving Sidewalk. This invention had its debut at the Worlds Columbian Exposition and saw usage in subsequent Worlds Fairs.

=== Style of architecture ===
Among his most prominent architectural works is the landmark Syracuse Savings Bank Building (1876). Built next to the Erie Canal on Clinton Square in Syracuse, it is often referred to as a textbook example of the High Victorian Gothic style. Silsbee also designed the White Memorial Building (1876), the Amos Block (1878), and the Oakwood Cemetery Chapel (1879–80), all extant in Syracuse. Upland Farm (1892), the lost mansion designed for Frederick R. and Dora Sedgwick Hazard in nearby Solvay, New York, is an example of the fashionable residential work that Silsbee was best known for. Silsbee also designed various dwellings around New York State in Ballston Spa, Albany, and Peekskill (in the latter place for Henry Ward Beecher)

Silsbee designed the lavish interiors of Potter Palmer's "castle" in Chicago. Several of his residential designs survive in Riverside and Evanston Illinois. His most prominent surviving work in Chicago is the Lincoln Park Conservatory. Considerably smaller in scale but filled with such elegant details as mosaic floors and a graceful oak roof with "hammer-beams trusses and curved brackets" is his Horatio N. May Chapel on the grounds of Rosehill Cemetery. Silsbee designed the movable walkway at the World's Columbian Exposition pier in 1893, and submitted plans to provide this improvement for the Brooklyn Bridge in 1894, although these plans were never executed.

In his 1941 autobiography, Frank Lloyd Wright wrote:

Silsbee could draw with amazing ease. He drew with soft, deep black lead-pencil strokes and he would make remarkable free-hand sketches of that type of dwelling peculiarly his own at the time. His superior talent in design had made him respected in Chicago. His work was a picturesque combination of gable turret and hip with broad porches quietly domestic and gracefully picturesque. A contrast to the awkward stupidities and brutalities of the period elsewhere.

Silsbee practiced architecture until his death in 1913.

=== Works ===
Works include:

Building	Image	Dates	Location	City, State	Description
William S. Warfield House		1886 built 1979 NRHP-listed	1624 Maine St. 39.931389°N 91.389722°W	Quincy, Illinois	Built in 1886 on Maine Street in a blend of the Richardsonian Romanesque and Queen Anne styles. The house features a stone exterior with terra cotta decorations, a massive plan, and a large western porch as well as several smaller porches throughout.
Bryant H. and Lucie Barber House		c. 1901 built 1993 NRHP-listed	103 North Barber Avenue; 41.986389°N 89.581667°W	Polo, Illinois	Constructed around 1901, the house has brick walls, a stone foundation and incorporates steel into its construction.
Henry D. Barber House		c.1891 built 1974 NRHP-listed	410 West Mason Street; 41.986482°N 89.58236°W	Polo, Illinois	Designed by Silsbee and constructed around 1891, with minor alterations in 1899, the brick and limestone home is cast in Classical Revival style.
Amos Block		1878 built 1978 NRHP-listed	210-216 West Water Street; 43.050556°N 76.154722°W	Syracuse, New York	Romanesque Revival building formerly fronting on the Erie Canal, from which goods were loaded and unloaded from boats
Syracuse Savings Bank		1875 built 1971 NRHP-listed	102 N. Salina St.43.050833°N 76.152222°W	Downtown Syracuse, New York	Designed by Silsbee; built in 1875 adjacent to the Erie Canal; its passenger elevator, the first in Syracuse, was an attraction
White Memorial Building		1876 built 1973 NRHP-listed	100 E. Washington St. 43.049444°N 76.1525°W	Syracuse, New York	Prominent, 1876-built, Gothic building with "exceedingly pleasant" dissimilatudes
Unity Chapel		1886 built 1974 NRHP-listed	S of Spring Green off WI 23; 43.1325°N 90.060833°W	Spring Green, Wisconsin	Shingle style rural Wisconsin family chapel for the Chicago Unitarian minister Jenkin Lloyd Jones, designed by Silsbee (who was also building a Chicago church for him), with interior work left to Jones' young nephew Frank Lloyd Wright.
Charles H. Sedgwick House		1884 built c.1925 demolished	James St.	Sedgwick neighborhood, Syracuse, New York	Its roof had a "unique double-gable, a motif also seen on Silsbee's Thomas Drummond Home, built about a year later." Was built for Silsbee's brother-in-law, Charles Hamilton Sedgwick.
Thomas Drummond Home					

== Gallery ==
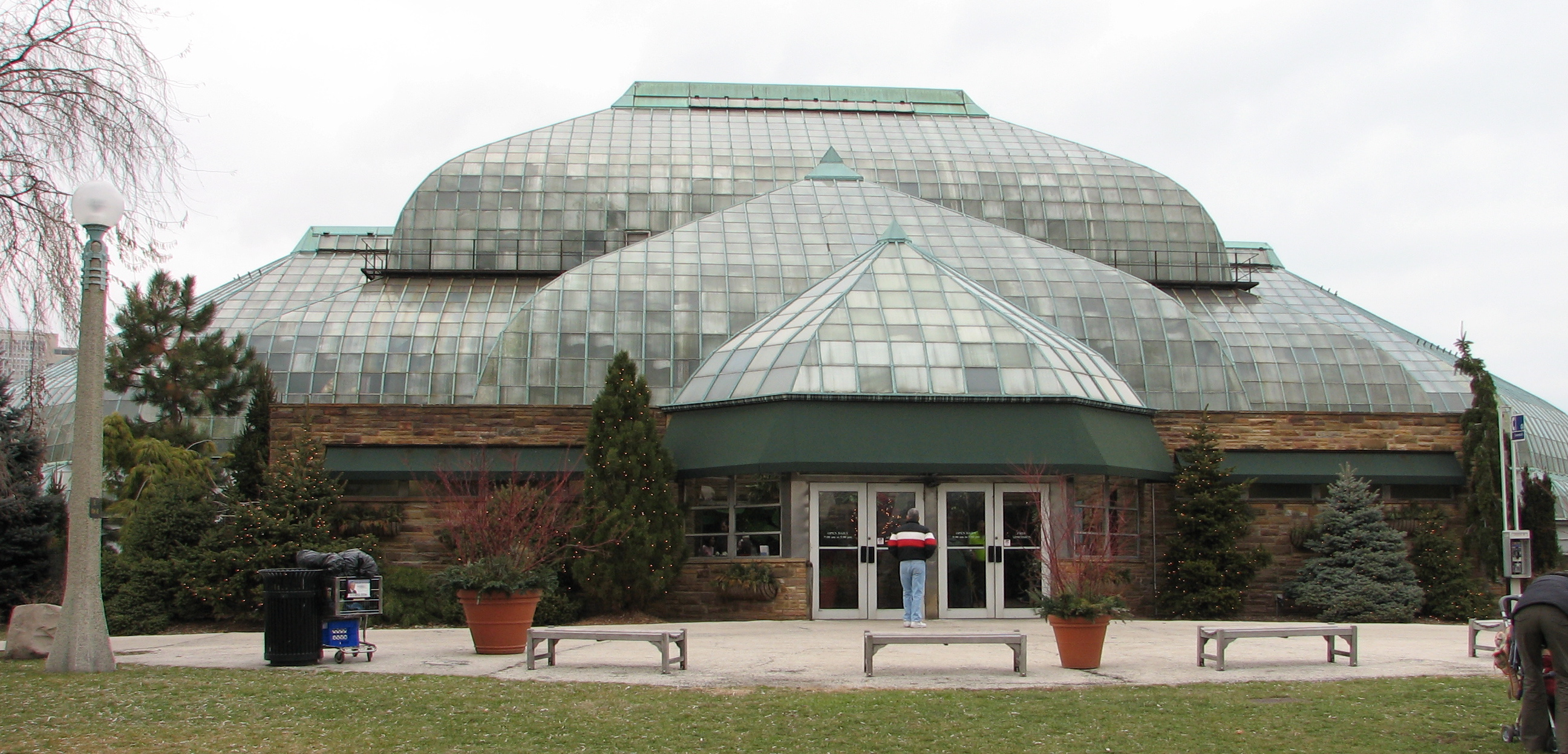
Lincoln Park Conservatory, Chicago, IL

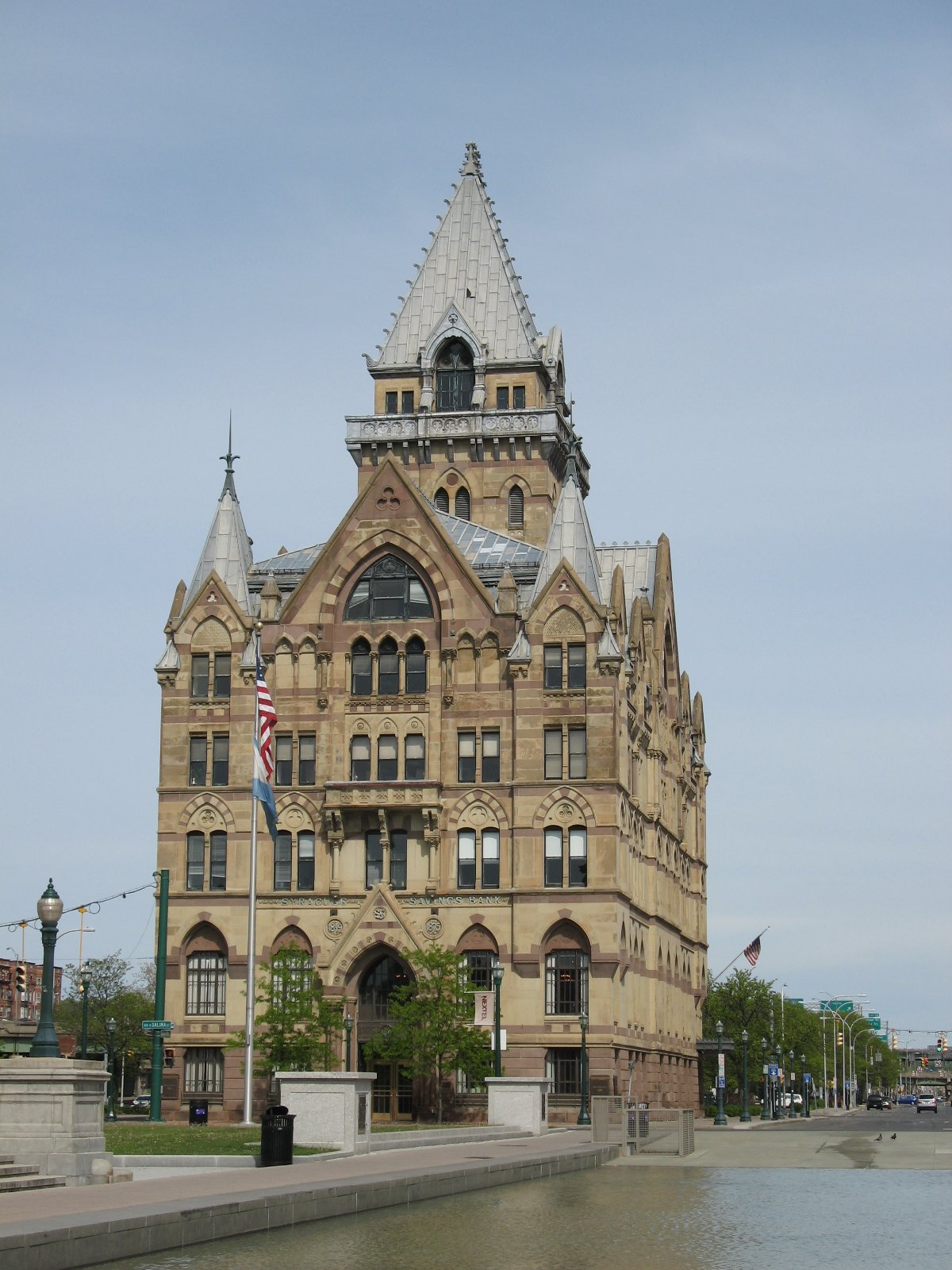
Syracuse Savings Bank Building

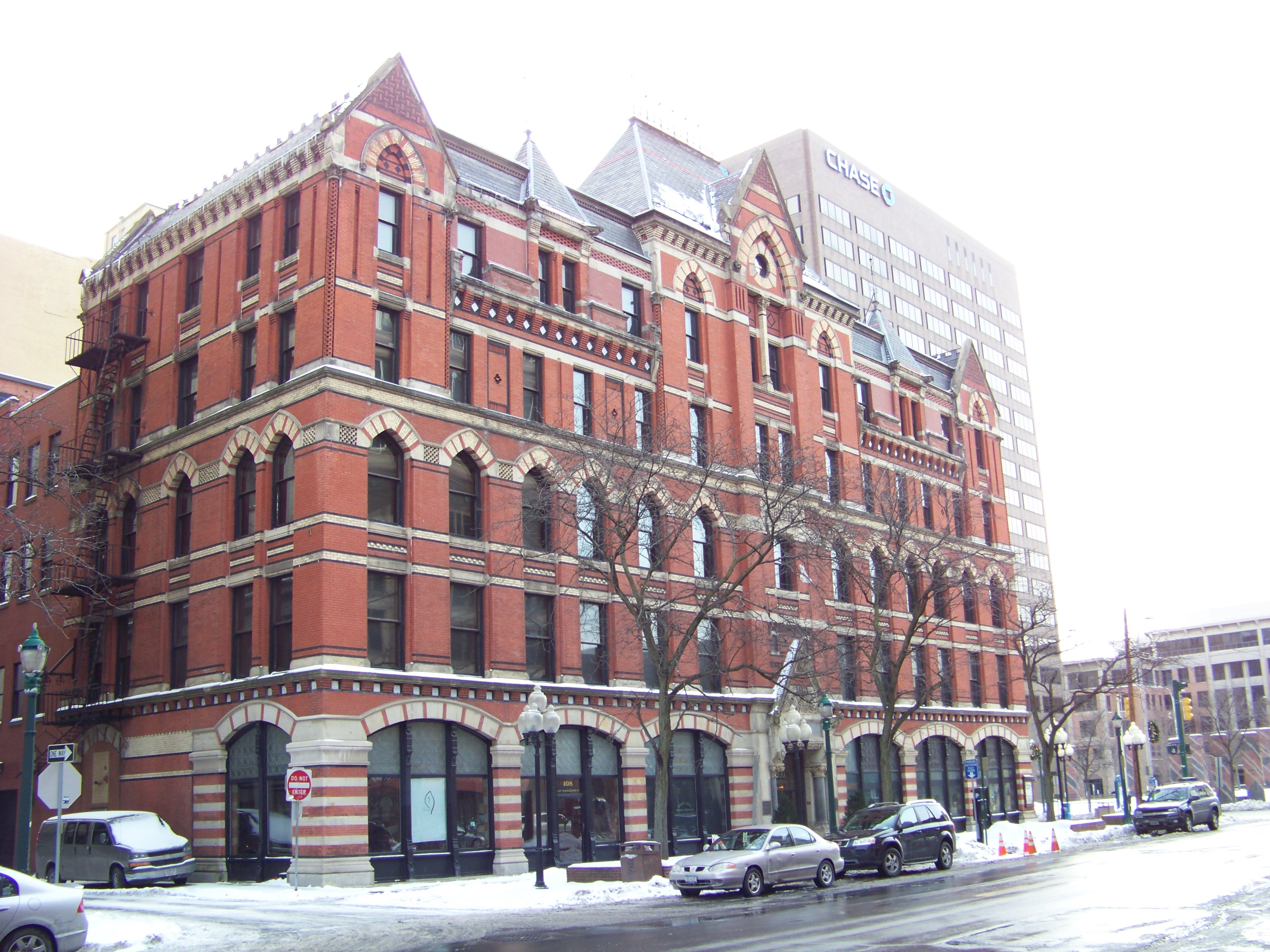
White Memorial Building, in Syracuse, New York

Upland Farm, the Frederick R. Hazard residence built in 1891

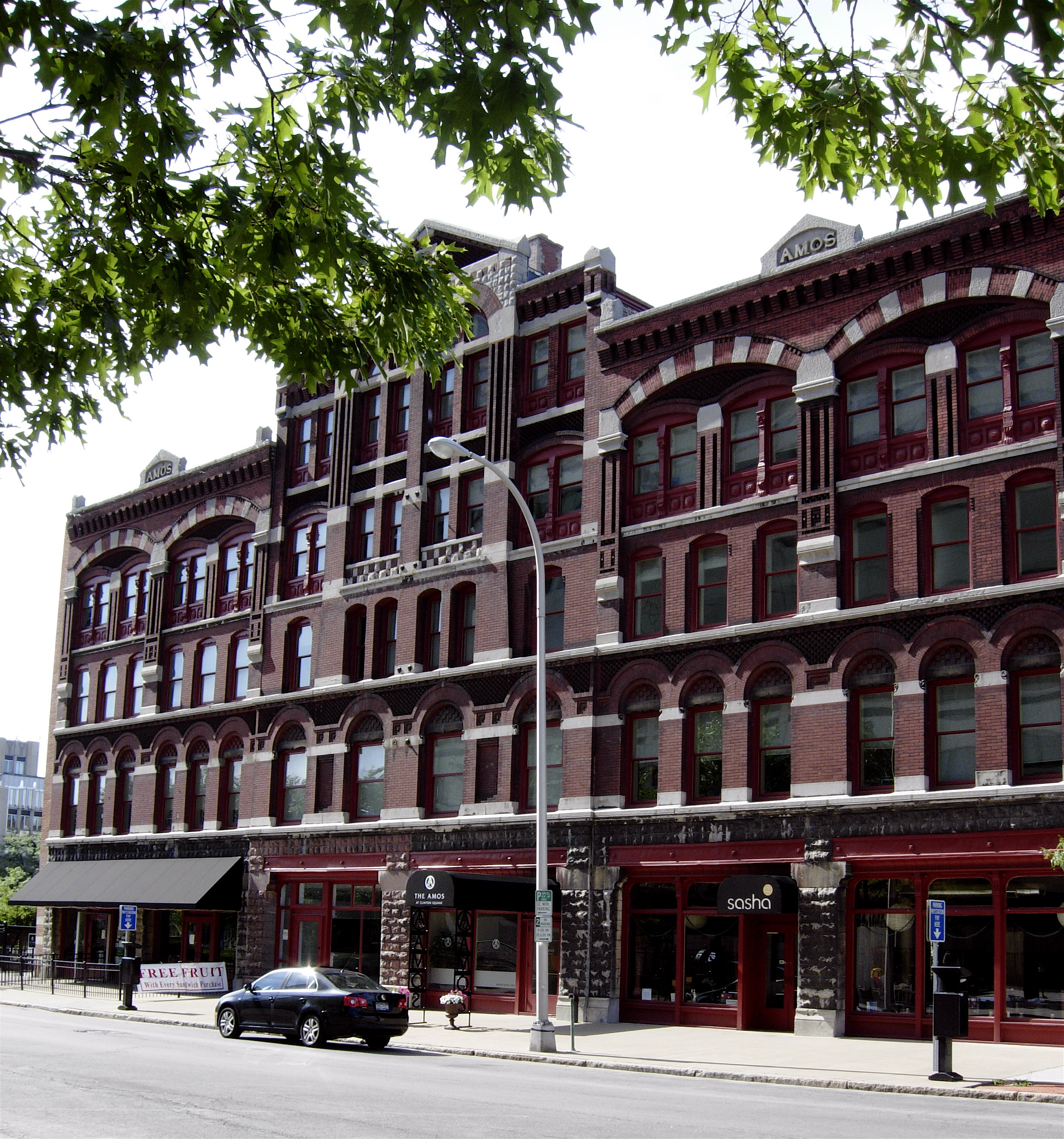
Amos Block, also in Syracuse

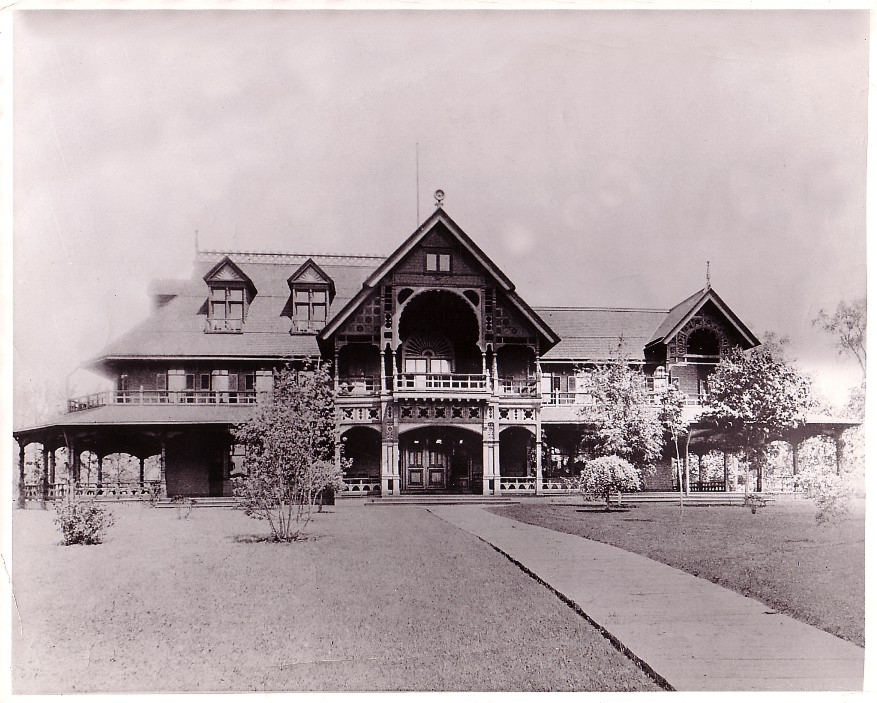
Falconwood Club in Grand Island, New York

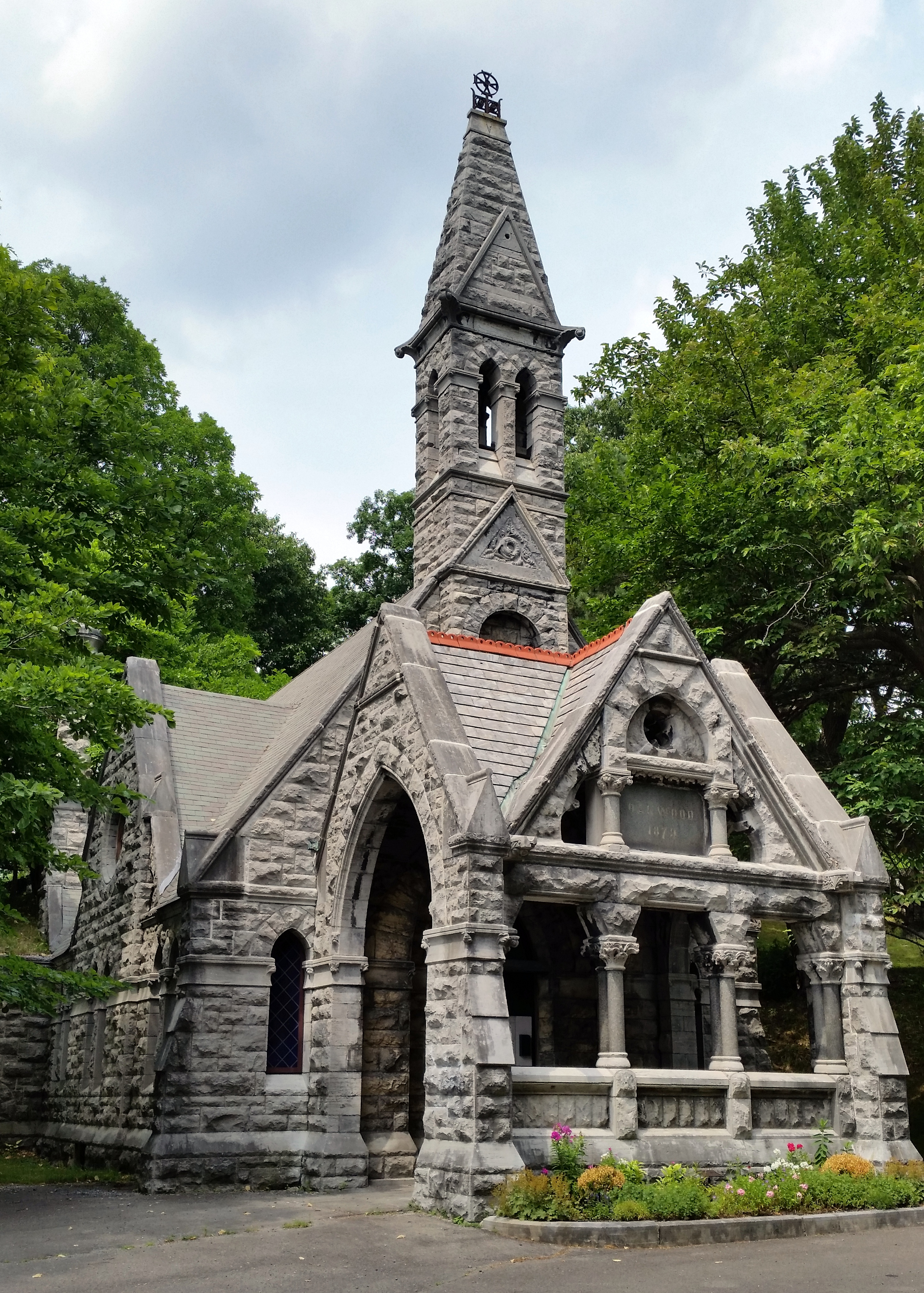
Mortuary chapel, Oakwood Cemetery, Syracuse, New York
