= Syracuse Savings Bank Building =

Historic commercial building in New York, United States

- Syracuse Savings Bank
- U.S. National Register of Historic Places
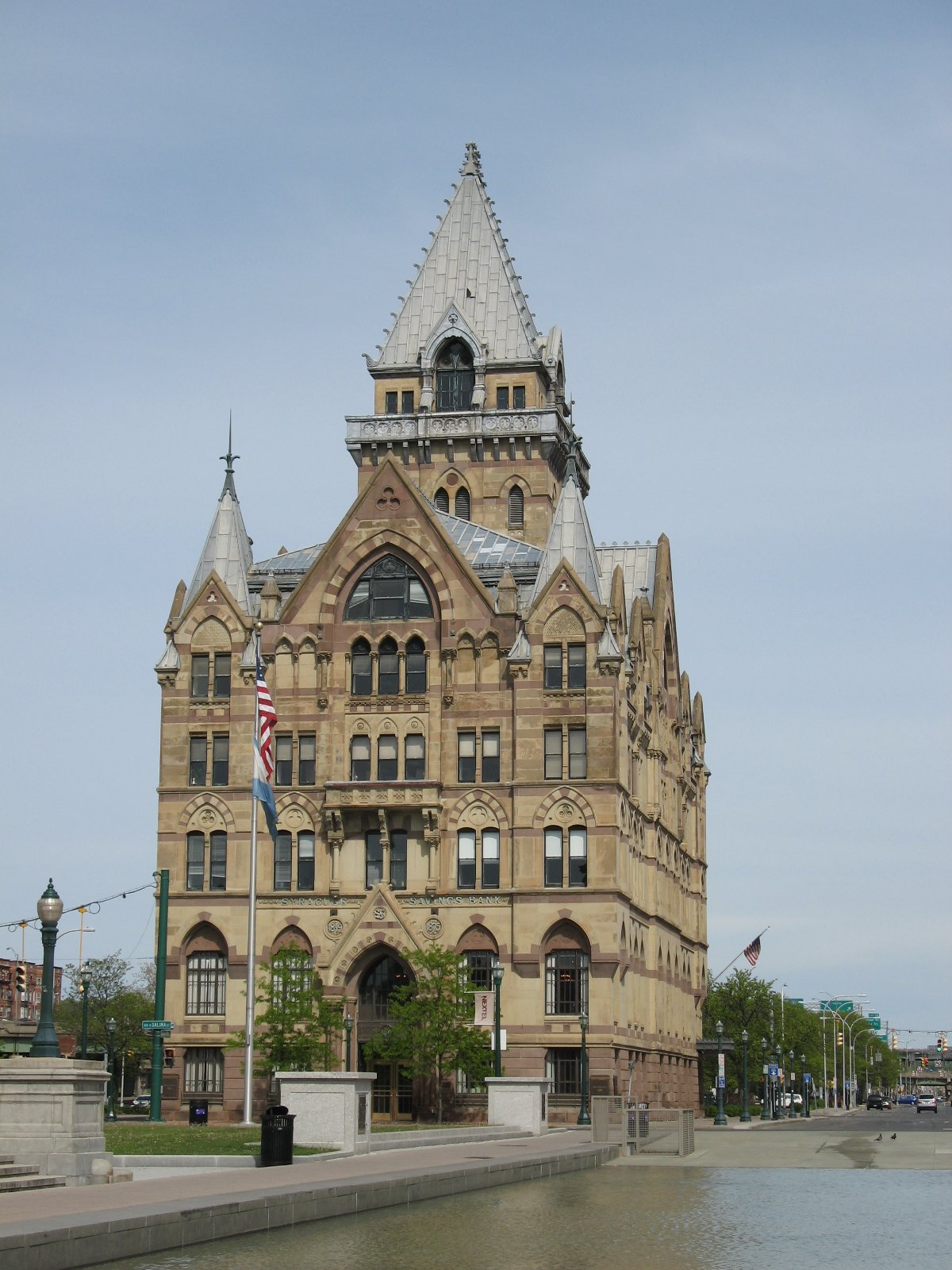

- Location within New York Location within the United States
- Interactive map showing the location of Syracuse Savings Bank
- Location: 102 N. Salina Street, Syracuse, New York
- Coordinates: 43°3′3.96″N 76°9′6.05″W
- Built: 1876
- Architect: Joseph Lyman Silsbee; John Moore
- Architectural style: Gothic Revival
- NRHP reference No.: 71000551
- Added to NRHP: February 18, 1971

Syracuse Savings Bank Building, also known as Bank of America building, is a historic building in Syracuse, New York designed by Joseph Lyman Silsbee.

It was built in 1875 adjacent to the Erie Canal, and, at 171 feet tall, was the tallest building in Syracuse. It opened in 1876 as Syracuse Savings Bank. Its passenger elevator, the first in Syracuse, was a curiosity that drew visitors.

== History ==
The building's current principal tenant, in the first four floors, is Bank of America. It was bought in 2007 by a limited liability corporation having four local principals for $1.75 million.

It is located at 102 N. Salina Street, across Erie Boulevard from the Gridley Building.

== See also ==
- List of Registered Historic Places in Onondaga County, New York
