= Wallace Rayfield =

American architect (1874–1941)

Wallace Augustus Rayfield
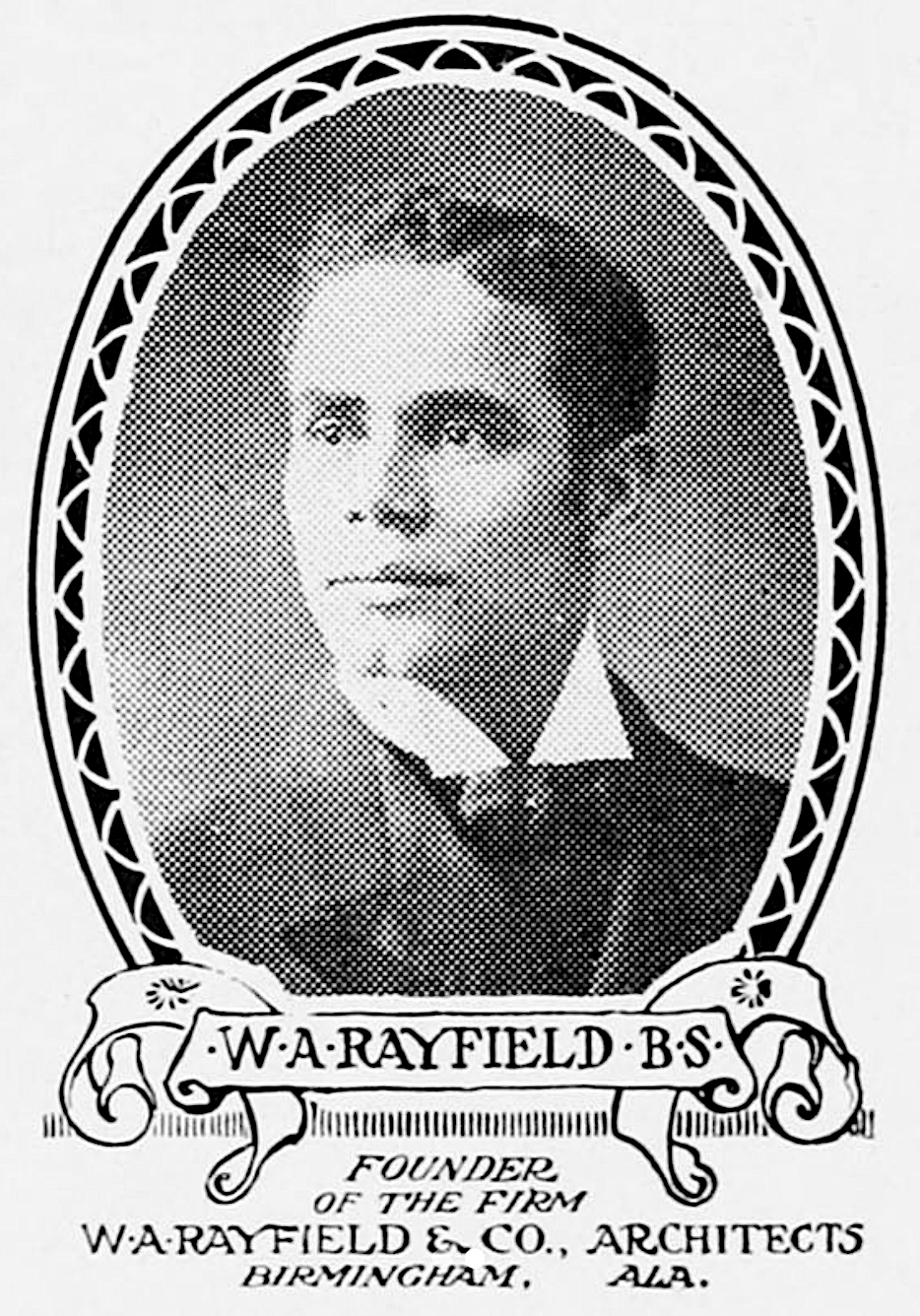
- Born: May 10, 1874; Bibb County, Georgia, U.S.
- Died: February 28, 1941 (aged 66); U.S.
- Other names: W. A. Rayfield, Wallace A. Rayfield
- Education: Howard University (BS), Pratt Institute, Columbia University (B. Arch)
- Occupations: Architect, educator
- Known for: Second formally educated practicing African American architect in the U.S.

Wallace Augustus Rayfield (1874–1941), also known as W.A. Rayfield, was an American architect and educator. He was the second formally educated practicing African American architect in the United States.

== Early life and education ==
Wallace Augustus Rayfield was born around May 10, 1874 in Bibb County near Macon, Georgia. Rayfield attended schools in Macon, Georgia before moving to Washington, D.C. to live with his aunt after the death of his mother.

He was an apprentice at an architectural firm A. B. Mullett and Co. while attending Howard University in Washington, D.C. Rayfield received a B.S. degree in 1896 in classics from Howard University. He then completed a graduate certificate in 1898 from Pratt Institute, before earning his bachelor of architecture (B. Arch) in architecture from Columbia University in 1899.

== Career ==
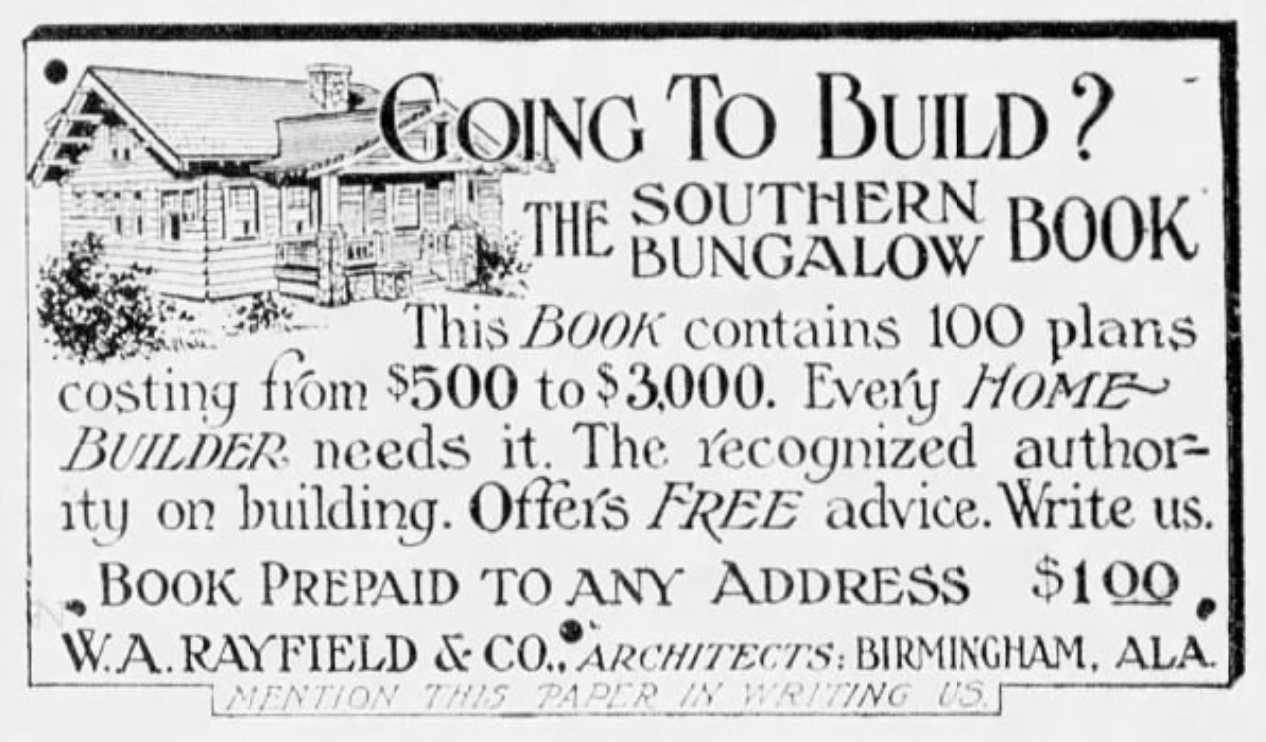
W. A. Rayfield & Co., Architects advertisement, 1917

Upon graduation, he was recruited by Booker T. Washington to the role Directorship of the Architectural and Mechanical Drawing Department at Tuskegee Institute (now Tuskegee University) in Tuskegee, Alabama. His students included William Sidney Pittman, and Vertner Woodson Tandy.

In 1907, Rayfield opened a professional office in Tuskegee, Alabama from which he sold mail-order plans nationwide. He also advertised "branch offices" in Birmingham, Montgomery, Mobile and Talladega, Alabama and Atlanta, Savannah, Macon and Augusta, Georgia. He left Tuskegee Institute and moved to Birmingham, Alabama in 1908 to focus on his young practice. He was elected as Superintending Architect for the Freedman's Aid Society, and Connectional Architect of the African Methodist Episcopal Zion Church.

He died on February 28, 1941.

== Notable work ==
- Birmingham Art Club (1908), Birmingham, Alabama
- Dr. Arthur M. Brown Residence (1908), 319-4th Terrace, Birmingham, Alabama; demolished
- Sixth Avenue Baptist Church (1909), 1531-6th Avenue, Birmingham, Alabama
- 16th Street Baptist Church (1911), Birmingham, Alabama
- People's A.M.E. Zion Church (1911), Syracuse, New York
- T.C. Windham Construction Company Office Building (1912), Birmingham, Alabama
- Alabama Penny Savings Bank/Knights of Pythian Temple Building (1913), Birmingham, Alabama
- R. A. Blount Residence (1914), 322-6th Avenue North, Birmingham, Alabama
- 32nd Street Baptist Church (1924), Birmingham, Alabama
- Antioch Baptist Church (1926), 956 W. 9th Street, Cincinnati, Ohio
- Trinity Baptist Church, Birmingham, Alabama
- Harmony Street Baptist Church, Birmingham, Alabama
- Metropolitan A.M.E. Zion Church, Birmingham, Alabama
- Ebenezer Baptist Church, Chicago, Illinois
- St Paul's Episcopal Church, Batesville, Arkansas
- Trinity Building, South Africa
- Mt. Zion Baptist Church, Pensacola, Florida
- Morning Star Baptist Church, Demopolis, Alabama
- Marlinton Methodist Church, Marlinton, West Virginia
- Marlinton Presbyterian Church, Marlinton, West Virginia
- Mt. Pilgrim Baptist Church, Milton, Florida
- Madame Clisby Residence, Birmingham, Alabama
- Rocky Springs Presbyterian Church, Laurens, South Carolina
- First Missionary Baptist Church, Decatur, Alabama
- Pythian Temple Building, Cotton Avenue, Macon, Georgia
- St. Luke African Methodist Episcopal Church, Birmingham, Alabama
- First Congregational Church (now part of Talladega College), Talladega, Alabama
- Dorms at Haven Institute and Conservatory of Music, Meridian, Mississippi

== See also ==
- Robert R. Taylor, the first professionally trained African American architect in the U.S.
- African-American architects
