= William S. Warfield House =

Historic house in Illinois, United States

- U.S. National Register of Historic Places
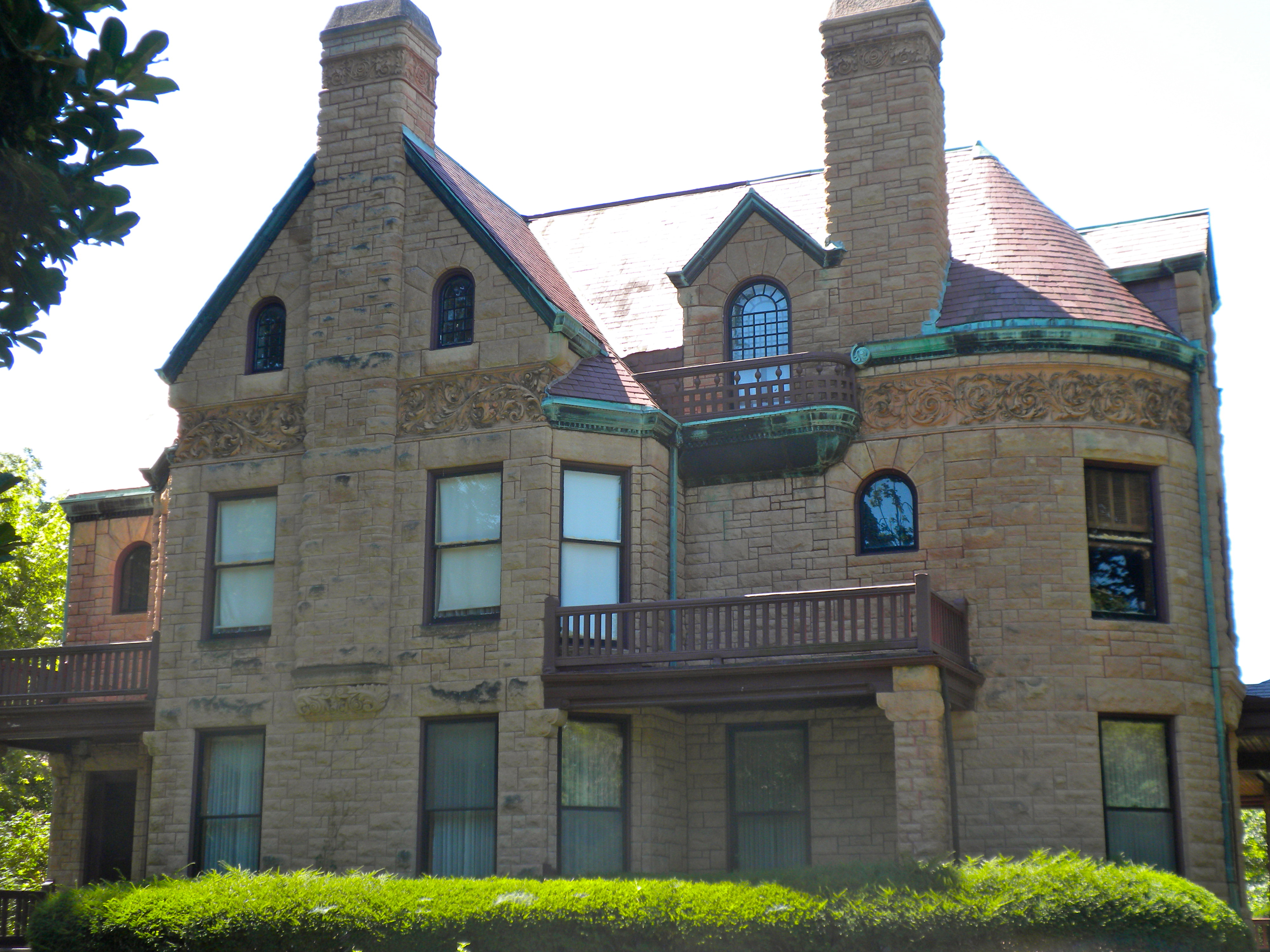

- Location within Illinois Location within the United States
- Interactive map showing the location of William S. Warfield House
- Location: 1624 Maine St., Quincy, Illinois
- Coordinates: 39°55′53″N 91°23′23″W
- Area: less than one acre
- Built: 1886
- Architect: Silsbee, Joseph Lyman
- Architectural style: Queen Anne, Richardsonian Romanesque
- NRHP reference No.: 79000814
- Added to NRHP: March 21, 1979

The William S. Warfield House is a historic house located at 1624 Maine Street in Quincy, Illinois. The house was built in 1886 for William S. Warfield, who founded the Warfield Grocery Co.; Warfield was one of many prominent Quincy residents to build a large house on Maine Street. Architect Joseph Lyman Silsbee designed the house in a blend of the Richardsonian Romanesque and Queen Anne styles; his design popularized Romanesque architecture, and the blend with Queen Anne in particular, in Quincy. The house features a stone exterior with terra cotta decorations, a massive plan, and a large western porch as well as several smaller porches throughout.

The house was added to the National Register of Historic Places on March 21, 1979.
