= Syracuse, New York =

City in New York, United States

Syracuse
- City
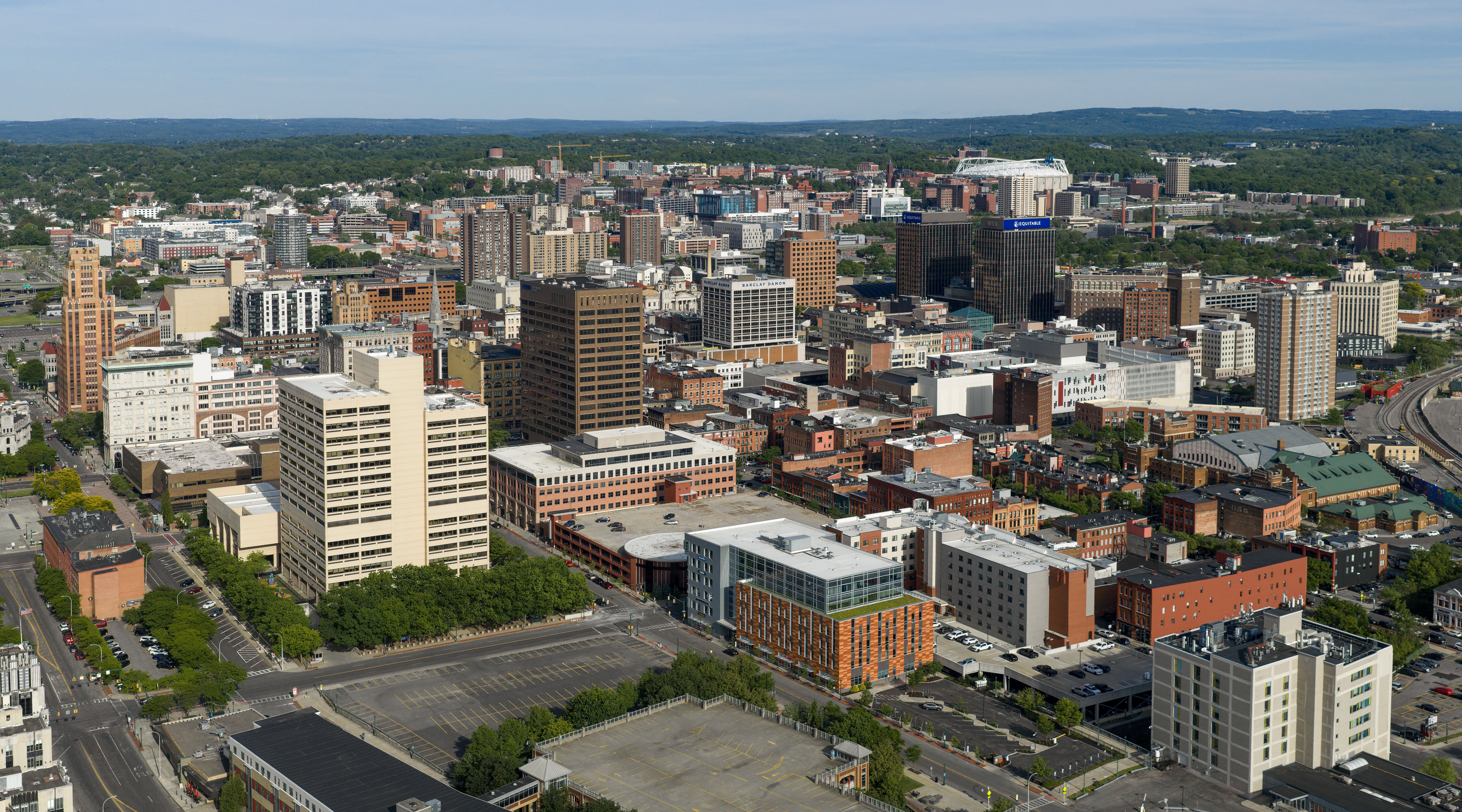
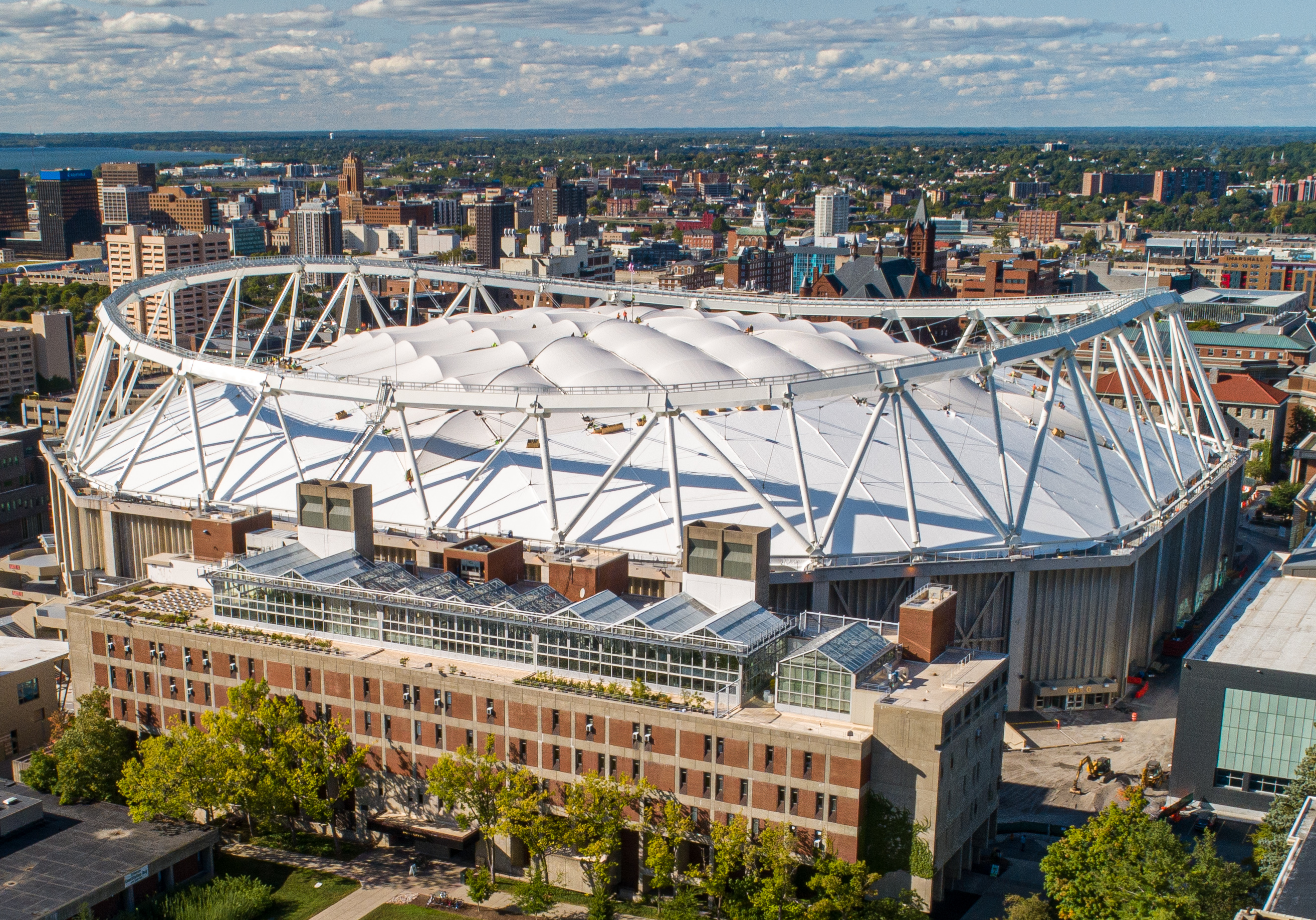
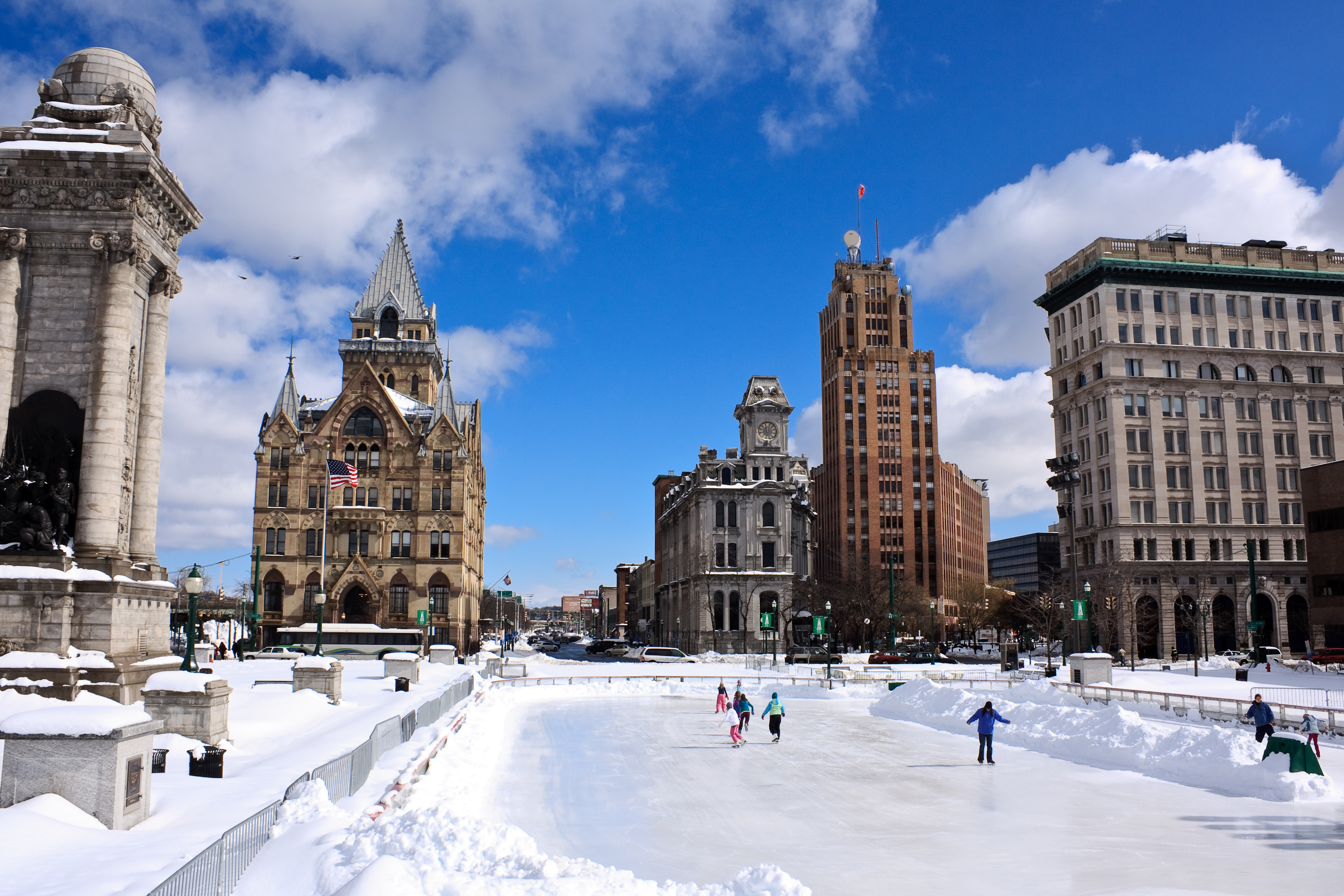
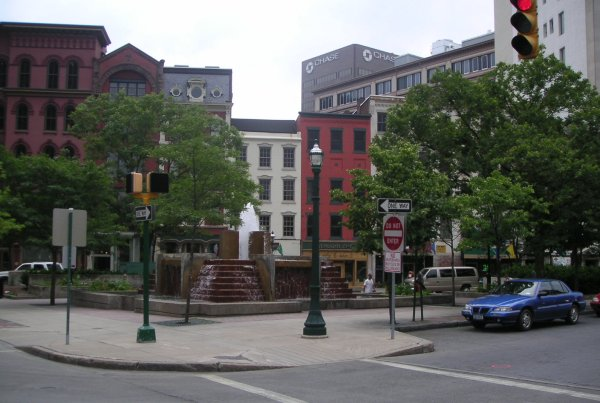
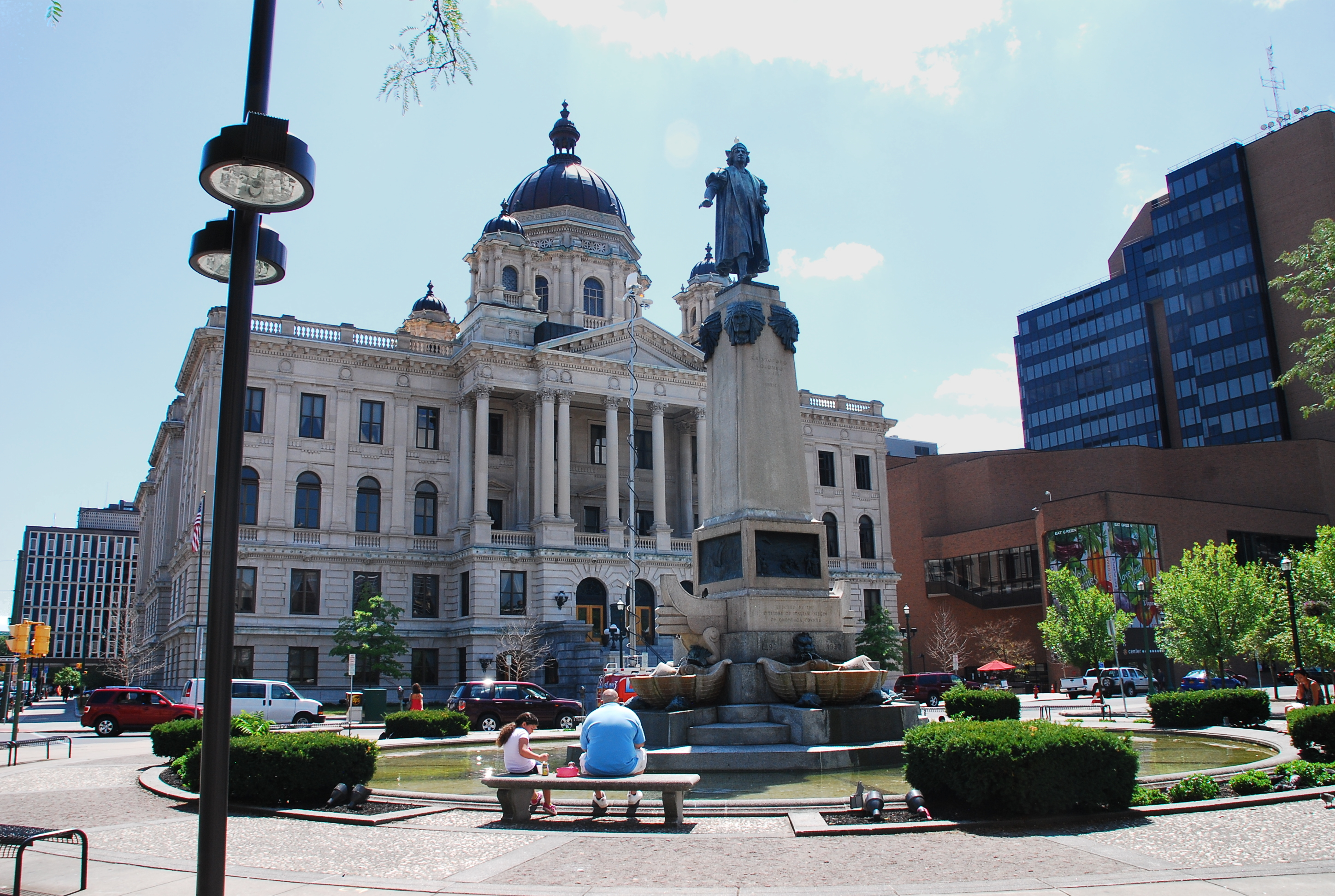
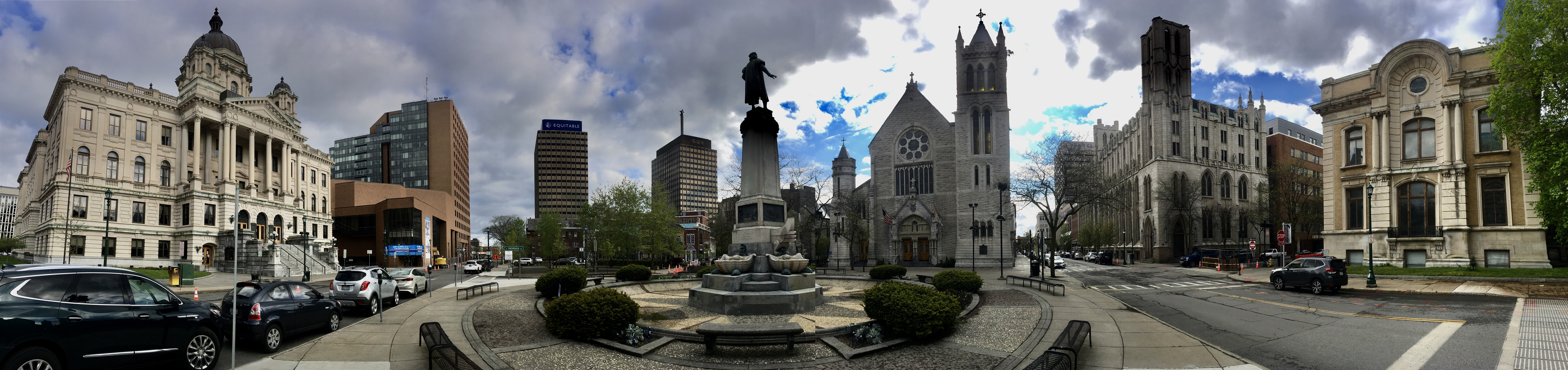
- Downtown Syracuse JMA Wireless Dome Clinton Square Hanover Square Columbus Circle Historic District Panorama of Columbus Circle Historic District

- Flag Seal
- Nickname(s): The Salt City, Siberacuse (colloquially, due to extreme cold climate)
- Interactive map of Syracuse
- Location within New York Location within the United States
- Coordinates: 43°02′49″N 76°08′40″W
- Country: United States
- State: New York
- Region: Central New York
- Statistical area: Syracuse Metropolitan
- County: Onondaga
- Incorporated (village): 1825; 201 years ago
- Incorporated (city): 1847; 179 years ago
- Named for: Syracuse, Sicily

Government
  - Type: Strong mayor-council
  - Mayor: Sharon Owens (D)
  - Common Council: Members' List: President: • Helen Hudson (D); At Large Members: • Chol Majok (D); • Rasheada Caldwell (D); • Rita Paniagua (D); • Amir Gethers (D); • D1: Marty Nave (D); • D2: Patrick Hogan (D); • D3: Corey Williams (D); • D4: Patrona Jones-Rowser (D); • D5: Jimmy Monto (D)

Area
  - City: 25.64 sq mi (66.41 km^{2})
  - Land: 25.06 sq mi (64.90 km^{2})
  - Water: 0.58 sq mi (1.51 km^{2}) 2.15%
- Elevation: 381–443 ft (116–135 m)

Population (2020)
  - City: 148,620
  - Density: 5,930.8/sq mi (2,289.88/km^{2})
  - Urban: 413,660 (US: 102nd)
  - Urban density: 2,291/sq mi (884.7/km^{2})
  - Metro: 662,057 (US: 91st)
  - CSA: 738,305 (US: 72nd)
- Demonym: Syracusan
- Time zone: UTC−5 (Eastern)
  - Summer (DST): UTC−4 (Eastern Daylight Time)
- ZIP Code: 132xx
- Area codes: 315, 680
- FIPS code: 36-73000
- GNIS feature ID: 0966966
- Website: syr.gov

Syracuse (/ˈsɪrəkjuːz, ˈsɛr-, -kjuːs/ SIRR-ə-kewz, SERR-, -kewss) is a city in New York, United States, and the county seat of Onondaga County. With 148,620 residents, and a metropolitan area of 662,057 people, it is the most populous city in Central New York, as well as the fifth-most populated city and 13th-most populated municipality in New York. (Note: As of the 2020 census.)

Formally established in 1820, Syracuse was named after the classical Greek city of Syracuse (Siracusa in Italian), located on the eastern coast of the Italian island of Sicily, for its similar natural features. Adjacent brine springs made the city a major producer of commercial salt into the late 19th century, earning the nickname "The Salt City"; it subsequently became a major industrial center until the mid-20th century, and has since become a hub for higher education, research, and services.

Syracuse has historically functioned as a major crossroads in the state, beginning in the 1820s with the Erie Canal, which runs through Clinton Square, then for the New York Central Railroad network established in the mid 19th century. Today, the city is at the interchange of I-81 and I-90, and its airport is the largest in Central New York, serving over one million inhabitants.

Syracuse is the economic and educational center of Central New York. It hosts a number of convention sites, including a large downtown convention complex, and is home to Destiny USA, the largest shopping mall in New York and the 10th largest in the country. Prominent academic and research institutions include Syracuse University, SUNY Upstate Medical University, SUNY ESF, Le Moyne College and Onondaga Community College.

== History ==
The area which would become Syracuse was home to the Onondaga Nation, one of the five nations of the Haudenosaunee Confederacy, for centuries prior to European arrival. During this time, the village of Onondaga served as the traditional capital of the Haudenosaunee Grand Council.

French missionaries were the first Europeans to come to this area, arriving to work with and convert the Native Americans to Christianity in the mid-17th century. A Jesuit priest by the name of Simon Le Moyne, accompanied by soldiers and coureurs des bois, including Pierre Esprit Radisson, set up a mission, known as Ste. Marie de Gannentaha, on the northeast shore of Onondaga Lake. Jesuit missionaries reported salty brine springs around the southern end of what they referred to as "Salt Lake", known today as Onondaga Lake after the indigenous inhabitants. French fur traders established trade throughout the New York area among the Haudenosaunee. Dutch and English colonists also were traders, and the English nominally claimed the area, from their upstate base at Albany, New York.

After centuries of unity, the American Revolutionary War divided the consensus-based Haudenosaunee, with the Confederacy dividing into a pro-British majority and a minority, mainly the Oneida and Tuscarora, who supported the American-born patriots. Following the Revolution, settlers came into central and western New York from eastern parts of the state and New England after the American Revolutionary War and various treaties with and land sales by the Haudenosaunee. The subsequent designation of this area by the state of New York as the Onondaga Salt Springs Reservation provided the basis for commercial salt production. Such production took place from the late 1700s through the early 1900s. Brine from wells that tapped into halite (common salt) beds in the Salina shale near Tully, New York, 15 miles south of the city, was developed in the 19th century. It is the north-flowing brine from Tully that is the source of salt for the "salty springs" found along the shoreline of Onondaga Lake. The rapid development of this industry in the 18th and 19th centuries led to the nicknaming of this area as "The Salt City".

The original settlement of Syracuse was a conglomeration of several small towns and villages and was not recognized with a post office by the United States Government. Establishing the post office was delayed because the settlement did not have a name. Joshua Forman wanted to name the village Corinth. When John Wilkinson applied for a post office in that name in 1820, it was denied because the same name was already in use in Saratoga County, New York. Having read a poetic description of Syracuse, Sicily (Siracusa), Wilkinson saw similarities to the lake and salt springs of this area, which had both "salt and freshwater mingling together". On February 4, 1820, Wilkinson proposed the name "Syracuse" to a group of fellow townsmen; it became the name of the village and the new post office.

The first Solvay Process Company plant in the United States was erected on the southwestern shore of Onondaga Lake in 1884. The village was called Solvay to commemorate the inventor Ernest Solvay. In 1861, he developed the ammonia-soda process for the manufacture of soda ash (anhydrous sodium carbonate) from brine wells dug in the southern end of Tully valley (as a source of sodium chloride) and limestone (as a source of calcium carbonate). The process was an improvement over the earlier Leblanc process. The Syracuse Solvay plant was the incubator for a large chemical industry complex owned by Allied Signal in Syracuse. While this industry stimulated development and provided many jobs in Syracuse, it left Onondaga Lake as the most polluted in the nation.

The salt industry declined after the Civil War, but a new manufacturing industry arose in its place. Throughout the late 1800s and early 1900s, numerous businesses and stores were established, including the Franklin Automobile Company, which produced the first air-cooled engine in the world; the Century Motor Vehicle Company; the Smith Corona company; and the Craftsman Workshops, the center of Gustav Stickley's handmade furniture empire.

On March 24, 1870, Syracuse University was founded. The State of New York granted the new university its own charter, independent of Genesee College, which had unsuccessfully tried to move to Syracuse the year before. The university was founded as coeducational. President Peck stated at the opening ceremonies, "The conditions of admission shall be equal to all persons.... There shall be no invidious discrimination here against woman.... Brains and heart shall have a fair chance...." Syracuse implemented this policy and attracted a high proportion of women students. In the College of Liberal Arts, the ratio between male and female students during the 19th century was approximately even. The College of Fine Arts was predominantly female, and a low ratio of women enrolled in the College of Medicine and the College of Law.

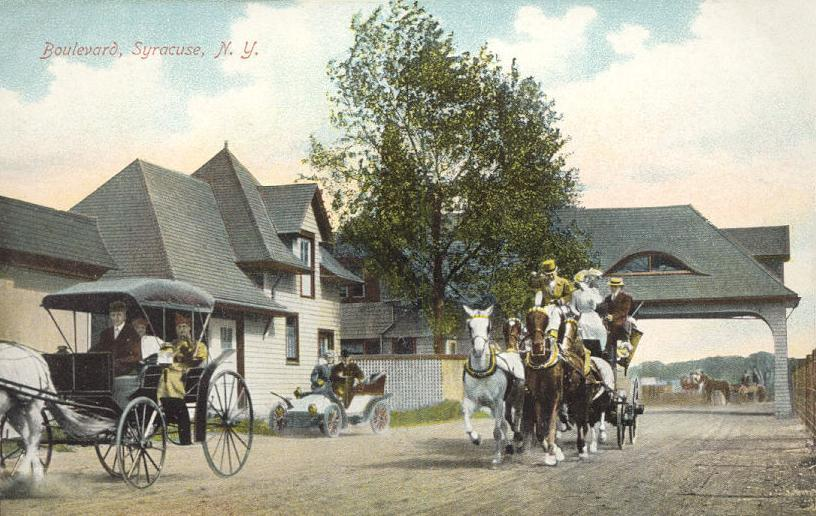
View of the Boulevard, c. 1908

The first New York State Fair was held in Syracuse in 1841. Between 1842 and 1889, the Fair was held among 11 New York cities before finding a permanent home in Syracuse. It has been an annual event since then, except between 1942 and 1947, when the grounds were used as a military base during World War II, and in 2020, due to the outbreak of the COVID-19 pandemic.

As part of the racial incidents happening all over the country during the 1919 Red Summer, on July 31, 1919, there was a violent riot between white and black workers of the Syracuse Globe Malleable Iron Works.

Syracuse is home to the only "green on top" traffic light. The "green on top" traffic light was installed in 1928 as a result of local youths throwing rocks at the "British red" light that was originally on top. These locals became known as "stonethrowers" and the neighborhood now has the Tipperary Hill Heritage Memorial on the corner of Tompkins Street and Milton Avenue to commemorate this history.

World War II stimulated significant industrial expansion in the area: of specialty steel, fasteners, and custom machining. After the war, two of the Big Three automobile manufacturers (General Motors and Chrysler) had major operations in the area. Syracuse was also headquarters for Carrier Corporation, and Crouse-Hinds manufactured traffic signals in the city. General Electric, with its headquarters in Schenectady to the east, had its main television manufacturing plant at Electronics Parkway in Syracuse.

The manufacturing industry in Syracuse began to falter in the 1970s, as the industry restructured nationwide. Many small businesses failed during this time, which contributed to the already increasing unemployment rate. Rockwell International moved its factory outside New York state. General Electric moved its television manufacturing operations to Suffolk, Virginia, and later offshore to Asia. The Carrier Corporation moved its headquarters out of Syracuse, relocated its manufacturing operations out of state, and outsourced some of its production to Asian facilities. Although the city population has declined since 1950, the Syracuse metropolitan area population has remained fairly stable, growing by 2.5% since 1970. While this growth rate is greater than much of Upstate New York, it is far below the national average during that period.

The Syracuse Community Grid project, which began in 2023, consists of the partial demolition of Interstate 81 in Downtown Syracuse, with the goal of improving the city.

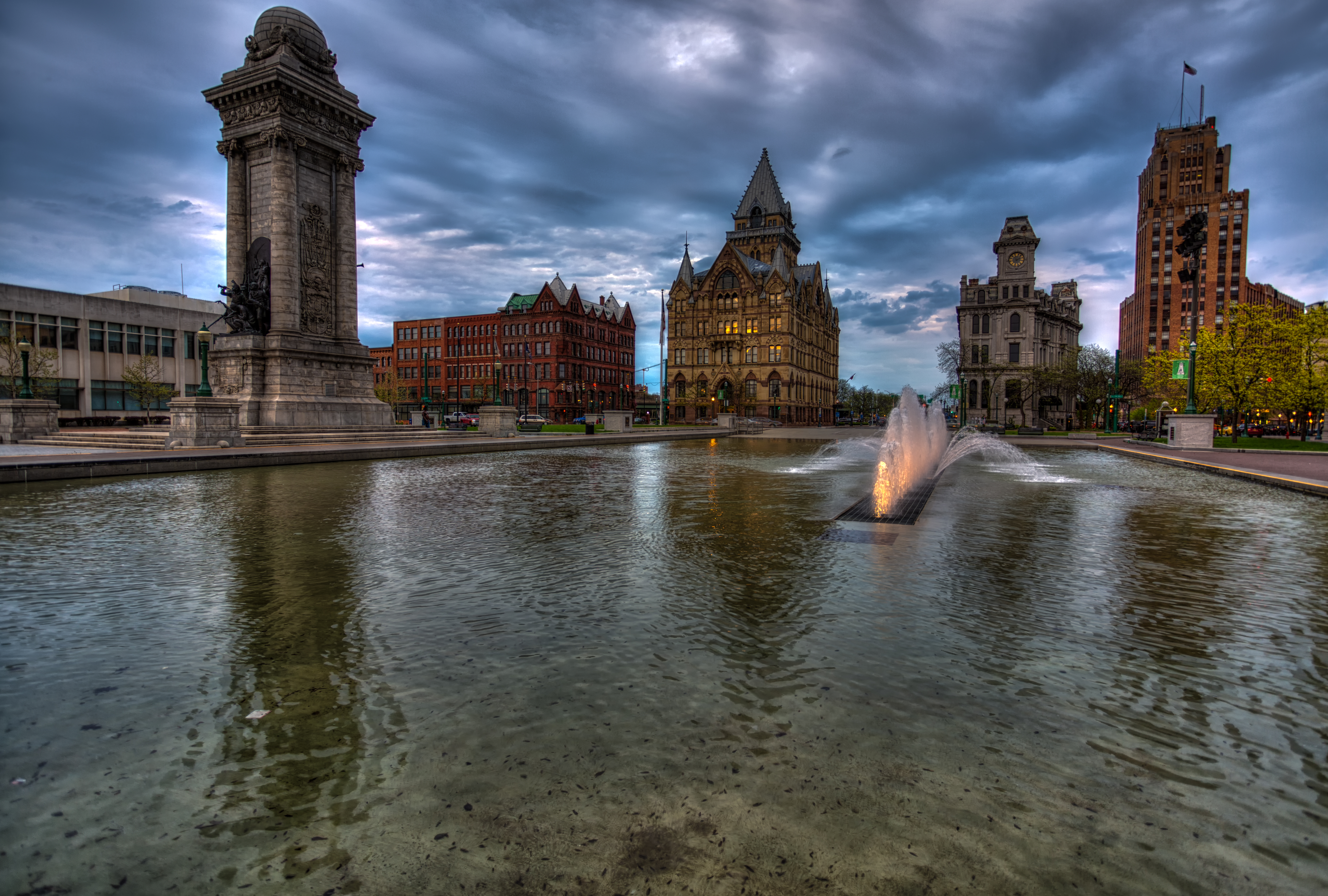
Historic Clinton Square

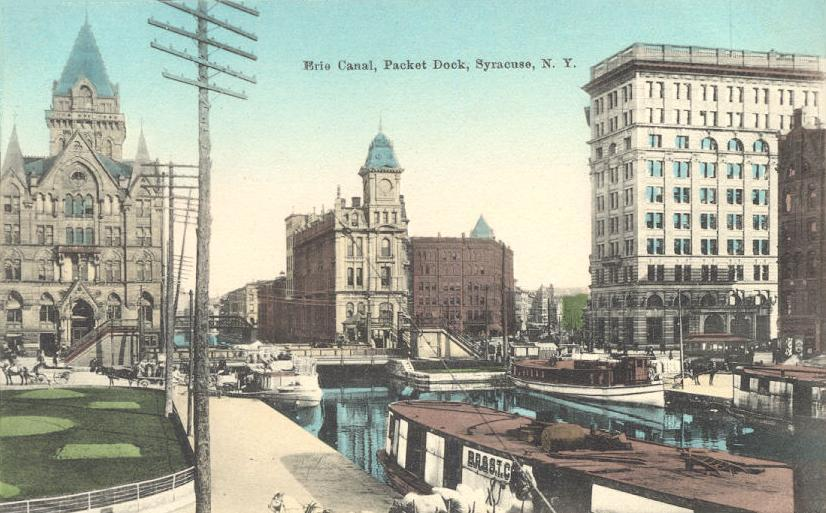
Erie Canal in Syracuse

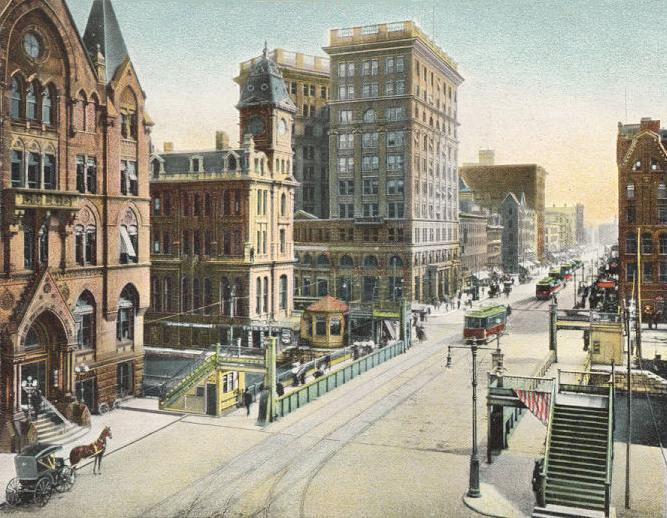
Salina Street

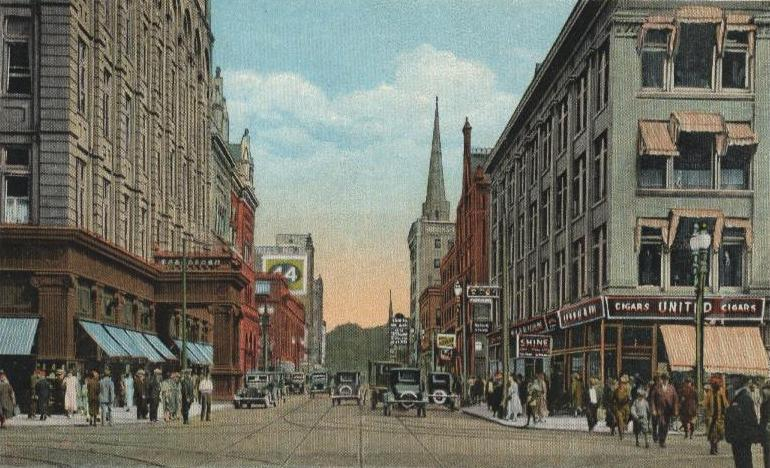
Fayette Street

== Geography ==
Syracuse is located at 43°2′49″N 76°8′40″W (43.046899, −76.144423). It is located about 87 miles (140 km) east of Rochester, 150 miles (240 km) east of Buffalo, and 145 miles (230 km) west of the state capital, Albany. It is also the halfway point between New York City and Toronto, about 245 miles (390 km) from each, Toronto to the northwest and NYC to the southeast.

According to the United States Census Bureau, the city has a total area of 66 square kilometres (25.6 square miles), of which 65 square kilometres (25.1 square miles) is land and 1.6 square kilometres (0.6 square miles) (2.15%) water.

The city developed at the northeast corner of the Finger Lakes region. The city has many neighborhoods that were originally independent villages, which joined the city over the years. Although the central part of Syracuse is flat, many of its neighborhoods are on small hills such as University Hill and Tipperary Hill. Land to the north of Syracuse is generally flat, while land to the south is hilly.

About 27% of Syracuse's land area is covered by 890,000 trees —a higher percentage than in Albany, Rochester, or Buffalo. The Labor Day Storm of 1998 was a derecho that destroyed approximately 30,000 trees. The sugar maple accounts for 14.2% of Syracuse's trees, followed by the Northern white cedar (9.8%) and the European buckthorn (6.8%). The most common street tree is the Norway maple (24.3%), followed by the honey locust (9.3%).

The densest tree cover in Syracuse is in the two Valley neighborhoods, where 46.6% of the land is covered by trees. The lowest tree cover percentage is found in the densely developed downtown, which has only 4.6% trees.

Syracuse's main water source is Skaneateles Lake, one of the country's cleanest lakes, located 15 mi (24 km) southwest of the city. Water from nearby Onondaga Lake is not potable due to industrial dumping that spanned many decades, leaving the lake heavily polluted. Incoming water is left unfiltered, and chlorine is added to prevent bacterial growth. Most of the environmental work to achieve lake cleanup was scheduled to be completed by 2016; however Honeywell, the company tasked with the cleanup, announced the project's completion in late 2017. For periods of drought, there is also a backup line which uses water from Lake Ontario.

Onondaga Creek, a waterway that runs through downtown, flows northward through the city. The Onondaga Creekwalk borders this, connecting the Lakefront, Inner Harbor, Franklin Square and Armory Square neighborhoods. The creek continues through the Valley and ultimately to the Onondaga Nation. The creek is navigable, but it can be a challenge. Its channelized nature speeds up its flow, particularly in the spring, when it may be dangerous. After some youngsters drowned in the creek, some residential areas fenced-off the creek in their neighborhoods.

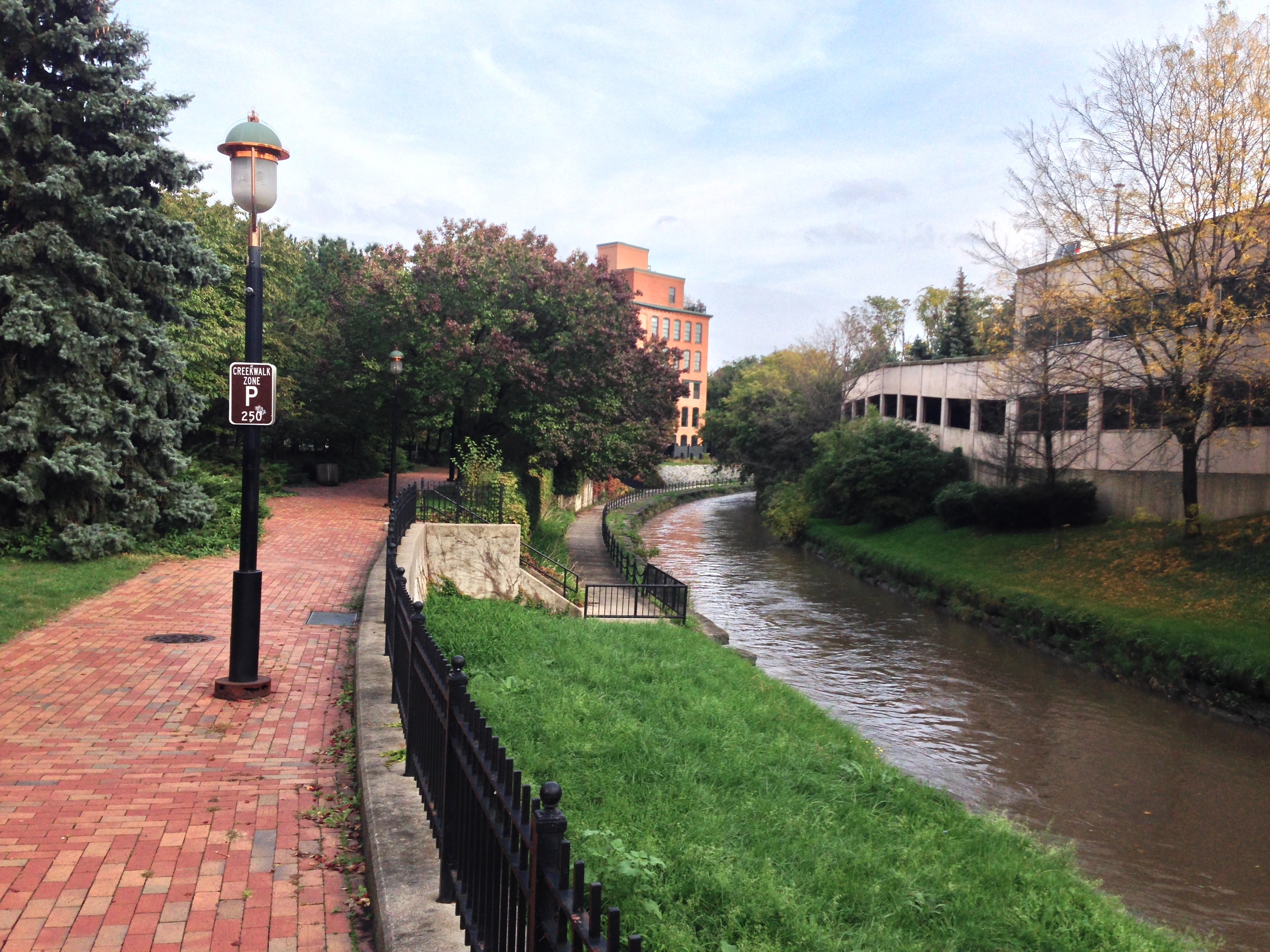
Onondaga Creekwalk

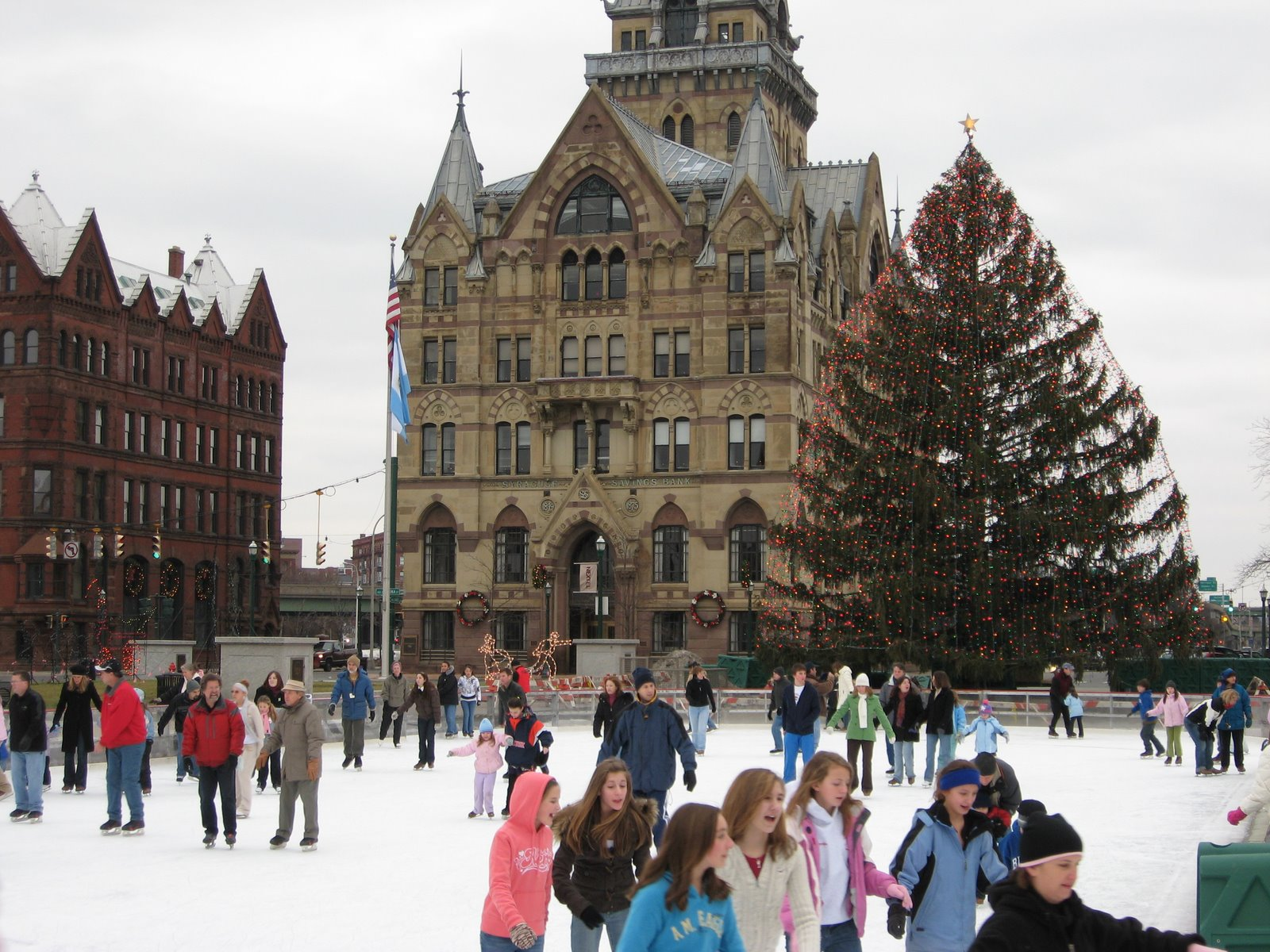
Winter in Syracuse

=== Neighborhoods ===
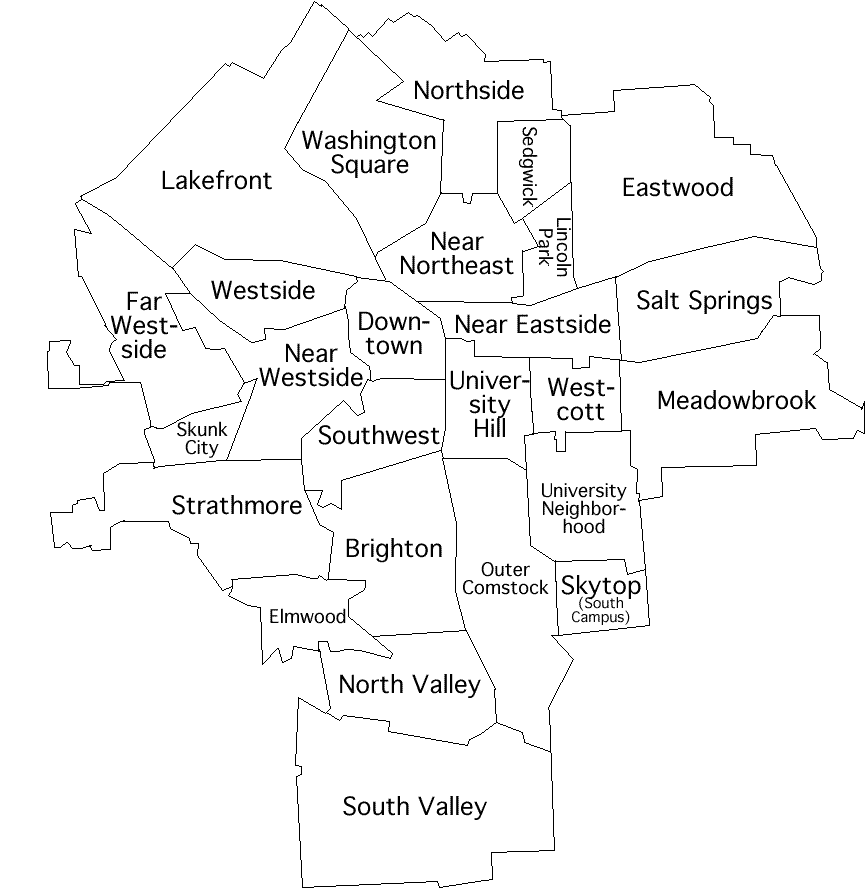
The 26 Syracuse neighborhoods

The City of Syracuse officially recognizes 26 neighborhoods within its boundaries. Some of these have small additional neighborhoods and districts inside of them. In addition, Syracuse also owns and operates Syracuse Hancock International Airport on the territory of four towns north of the city.

Syracuse's neighborhoods reflect the historically ethnic and multicultural population. Traditionally, Irish, Polish and Ukrainian Americans settled on its west side (see Tipperary Hill); Jewish Americans on its east side; German and Italian Americans on the north side; and African-Americans on its south side. In recent years, large numbers of refugees from the Middle East have settled mainly on the north side as well.

=== Climate ===
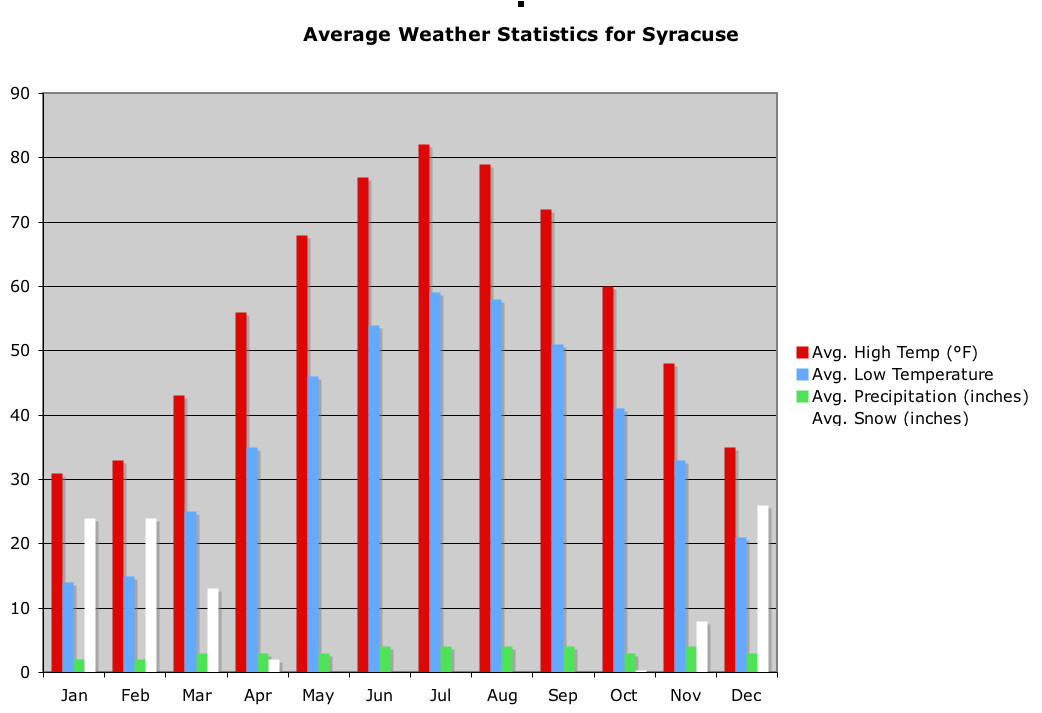
Syracuse's weather averages

Syracuse has a hot-summer humid continental climate (Dfa), as mean July temperatures are just above the 71.6 °F (22.0 °C) threshold needed for a hot-summer climate. The city is known for its high snowfall, 115.6 inches (2.94 meters) on average; Syracuse receives the most annual average snow of any metropolitan area in the United States. Syracuse usually wins the Golden Snowball Award among Upstate cities. Its record seasonal (July 1 to June 30 of the following year) snowfall so far is 192.1 in (4.88 m) during the winter of 1992–93, while the snowiest calendar month was January 2004, with 78.1 in (1.98 m) accumulated. The high snowfall is a result of the city receiving both heavy snow from the lake effect of nearby Lake Ontario (of the Great Lakes) and nor'easter snow from storms driven from the Atlantic Ocean. Snow most often falls in small (about 1–3 inches or 2.5–7.6 centimetres), almost daily doses, over a period of several days. Larger snowfalls do occur occasionally, and even more so in the northern suburbs.

The Blizzard of 1993 was described as the Storm of the Century. Some 42.9 in (109 cm) fell on the city within 48 hours, with 35.6 in (90 cm) falling within the first 24 hours. Syracuse received more snow than any other city in the country during this storm, which shattered a total of eight local records, including the most snow in a single snowstorm. A second notable snowfall was the Blizzard of 1966, with 42.3 in (107 cm). The Blizzard of '58 occurred in February (16–17th) across Oswego and Onondaga counties. This storm was classified as a blizzard due to the high winds, blowing snow, and cold; 26.1 in (66 cm) of snow was measured at Syracuse and drifts reached 20 ft (6.1 m) in Oswego County. (See Thirtieth Publication of the Oswego County Historical Society, (1969) and The Climate and Snow Climatology of Oswego N.Y., (1971)

Syracuse on average receives an annual precipitation of 38.47 inches (977 millimeters), with the months of July through September being the wettest in terms of total precipitation, while precipitation occurs on more days each month during the snow season.

The normal monthly mean temperature ranges from 23.6 °F (−4.7 °C) in January to 71.3 °F (21.8 °C) in July. The record high of 102 °F (39 °C) was recorded on July 9, 1936, and the record low of −26 °F (−32 °C) has occurred three times since 1942, the last being February 18, 1979.

In the early 21st century, a handful of previous heat records have been broken in the city. For example, July 2020 became the hottest month on record, with a mean temperature of 77.1 °F (25.1 °C), while the summers (June–August) of 2005, 2020, and 2012 were, respectively, the hottest, second-hottest, and third-hottest summers on record. Additionally, 2017 and 2018 saw consecutive monthly high temperature records broken in February, of 71 °F (22 °C) on February 24, 2017, and 75 °F (24 °C) on February 21, 2018, in addition to four consecutive days at or above 60 °F (16 °C). The latter was the warmest winter day on record.

Climate data for Syracuse Hancock International Airport, New York (1991–2020 normals, (Note: Mean monthly maxima and minima (i.e. the expected highest and lowest temperature readings at any point during the year or given month) calculated based on data at said location from 1991 to 2020.) extremes 1902–present (Note: Official records for Syracuse kept at downtown from August 1902 to April 1938, Syracuse Municipal Airport from May 1938 to September 17, 1949, and at Syracuse Hancock Int'l since September 18, 1949.))
Month	Jan	Feb	Mar	Apr	May	Jun	Jul	Aug	Sep	Oct	Nov	Dec	Year
Record high °F (°C)	70 (21)	75 (24)	87 (31)	92 (33)	96 (36)	100 (38)	102 (39)	101 (38)	98 (37)	89 (32)	81 (27)	72 (22)	102 (39)
Mean maximum °F (°C)	57.1 (13.9)	54.3 (12.4)	66.9 (19.4)	80.6 (27.0)	87.8 (31.0)	91.2 (32.9)	92.8 (33.8)	91.4 (33.0)	88.4 (31.3)	79.6 (26.4)	68.7 (20.4)	59.1 (15.1)	94.3 (34.6)
Mean daily maximum °F (°C)	31.7 (−0.2)	33.6 (0.9)	42.4 (5.8)	56.4 (13.6)	69.2 (20.7)	77.3 (25.2)	81.7 (27.6)	80.3 (26.8)	73.1 (22.8)	60.1 (15.6)	48.3 (9.1)	37.1 (2.8)	57.6 (14.2)
Daily mean °F (°C)	24.1 (−4.4)	25.5 (−3.6)	33.8 (1.0)	46.3 (7.9)	58.2 (14.6)	67.0 (19.4)	71.8 (22.1)	70.4 (21.3)	62.9 (17.2)	51.3 (10.7)	40.5 (4.7)	30.4 (−0.9)	48.5 (9.2)
Mean daily minimum °F (°C)	16.5 (−8.6)	17.5 (−8.1)	25.2 (−3.8)	36.2 (2.3)	47.3 (8.5)	56.7 (13.7)	62.0 (16.7)	60.4 (15.8)	52.7 (11.5)	42.4 (5.8)	32.7 (0.4)	23.7 (−4.6)	39.4 (4.1)
Mean minimum °F (°C)	−6.1 (−21.2)	−3.0 (−19.4)	5.3 (−14.8)	23.2 (−4.9)	34.1 (1.2)	43.9 (6.6)	51.9 (11.1)	49.3 (9.6)	38.0 (3.3)	28.8 (−1.8)	17.5 (−8.1)	3.6 (−15.8)	−9.6 (−23.1)
Record low °F (°C)	−26 (−32)	−26 (−32)	−16 (−27)	7 (−14)	25 (−4)	34 (1)	44 (7)	38 (3)	25 (−4)	18 (−8)	−1 (−18)	−26 (−32)	−26 (−32)
Average precipitation inches (mm)	2.58 (66)	2.46 (62)	3.04 (77)	3.48 (88)	3.42 (87)	3.56 (90)	3.86 (98)	3.70 (94)	3.38 (86)	3.89 (99)	3.23 (82)	3.28 (83)	39.88 (1,013)
Average snowfall inches (cm)	34.0 (86)	30.3 (77)	19.8 (50)	3.0 (7.6)	0.1 (0.25)	0.0 (0.0)	0.0 (0.0)	0.0 (0.0)	0.0 (0.0)	0.2 (0.51)	9.8 (25)	30.6 (78)	127.8 (325)
Average extreme snow depth inches (cm)	12.9 (33)	13.5 (34)	11.1 (28)	1.4 (3.6)	0.0 (0.0)	0.0 (0.0)	0.0 (0.0)	0.0 (0.0)	0.0 (0.0)	0.0 (0.0)	4.1 (10)	9.9 (25)	18.5 (47)
Average precipitation days (≥ 0.01 in)	18.9	16.6	15.5	14.5	13.2	12.0	11.7	10.7	11.1	15.1	15.9	18.5	173.7
Average snowy days (≥ 0.1 in)	17.8	15.2	10.1	2.5	0.1	0.0	0.0	0.0	0.0	0.3	5.9	13.6	65.5
Average relative humidity (%)	73.2	72.3	69.6	65.2	67.1	69.9	70.5	74.9	76.4	74.3	75.4	76.8	72.1
Average dew point °F (°C)	15.3 (−9.3)	16.3 (−8.7)	24.1 (−4.4)	33.3 (0.7)	45.1 (7.3)	55.0 (12.8)	59.9 (15.5)	59.7 (15.4)	53.1 (11.7)	41.7 (5.4)	32.7 (0.4)	21.7 (−5.7)	38.2 (3.4)
Mean monthly sunshine hours	102.8	116.7	172.5	204.4	243.1	260.6	289.3	247.1	193.0	144.3	76.7	69.0	2,119.5
Percentage possible sunshine	35	40	47	51	53	57	62	57	51	42	26	25	48
Source: NOAA (relative humidity, dew point, and sun 1961–1990)

== Demographics ==
Historical population
Census	Pop.	Note	%±
1850	22,271		—
1860	28,119		26.3%
1870	43,051		53.1%
1880	51,792		20.3%
1890	88,143		70.2%
1900	108,374		23.0%
1910	137,249		26.6%
1920	171,717		25.1%
1930	209,326		21.9%
1940	205,967		−1.6%
1950	220,583		7.1%
1960	216,038		−2.1%
1970	197,208		−8.7%
1980	170,105		−13.7%
1990	163,855		−3.7%
2000	146,070		−10.9%
2010	145,170		−0.6%
2020	148,620		2.4%
Historical Population Figures 2020

Syracuse city, New York – Racial and ethnic composition Note: the US Census treats Hispanic/Latino as an ethnic category. This table excludes Latinos from the racial categories and assigns them to a separate category. Hispanics/Latinos may be of any race.
Race / Ethnicity (NH = Non-Hispanic)	Pop 2000	Pop 2010	Pop 2020	% 2000	% 2010	% 2020
White alone (NH)	91,928	76,653	68,206	62.41%	52.80%	45.89%
Black or African American alone (NH)	36,246	40,672	43,568	24.61%	28.02%	29.32%
Native American or Alaska Native alone (NH)	1,538	1,390	1,170	1.04%	0.96%	0.79%
Asian alone (NH)	4,929	7,971	10,346	3.35%	5.49%	6.96%
Pacific Islander alone (NH)	54	37	57	0.04%	0.03%	0.04%
Some Other Race alone (NH)	350	303	897	0.24%	0.21%	0.60%
Mixed Race or Multi-Racial (NH)	4,493	6,108	8,751	3.05%	4.21%	5.89%
Hispanic or Latino (any race)	7,768	12,036	15,625	5.27%	8.29%	10.51%
Total	147,306	145,170	148,620	100.00%	100.00%	100.00%

As of the 2020 census, Syracuse had 148,620 residents and 60,652 households, compared to 145,170 people and 57,355 households a decade prior. Growth increased by 2.4% since the 2010 count, representing the first population increase in a decennial census since 1930, when the population peaked at over 209,000. However, U.S. Census estimates from July 1, 2025 reflected renewed decline to 144,896 residents, a drop of 2.5% from just five years prior.

As of 2020, the racial makeup of the city was 45.9% White, 29.3% African American, 0.79% Native American, 5.9% Asian, 0.04% Pacific Islander, 0.60% from other races, and 5.9% from two or more races. Hispanic or Latino residents of any race were 10.5% of the population. Non-Hispanic Whites were 52.8% of the population in 2010, down from 87.2% in 1970. Suburbanization and white flight attracted residents outside the city, even as new immigrant and migrant groups increased.

The largest ancestries include Italian (29.5%), Irish (18.4%), Polish (15.3%), German (9.6%), English (4.5%), and Slovak (3.6%). Foreign-born persons made up 12.7% of the population.

There were 57,355 households, out of which 29% had children under the age of 18 living with them, 9.3% were married couples living together, 20.8% had a female householder with no husband present, and 50.4% were non-families. 38.4% of all households were made up of individuals, and 10.4% had someone living alone who was 65 years of age or older. The average household size was 2.31 and the average family size was 3.14.

The median age of the city is 29.6 years. Nearly one in five residents (19%) were under the age of 15, 23% from 15 to 24, 25.6% from 25 to 44, 21.7% from 45 to 64, and 10.5% were 65 years of age or older. For every 100 females, there were 91 males. For every 100 females age 18 and over, there were 87.89 males.

According to the 2014 estimates from the American Community Survey, the median income for a household in the city was $31,566, and the median income for a family was $38,794. Males had a median income of $39,537 versus $33,983 for females. The per capita income for the city was $19,283. About 28.2% of families and 35.1% of the population were below the poverty line, including 50% of those under age 18 and 16.7% of those age 65 and over.

Syracuse ranks 50th in the United States for transit ridership and 12th for most pedestrian commuters. Each day, 38,332 people commute into Onondaga County from the four adjoining counties (2006).

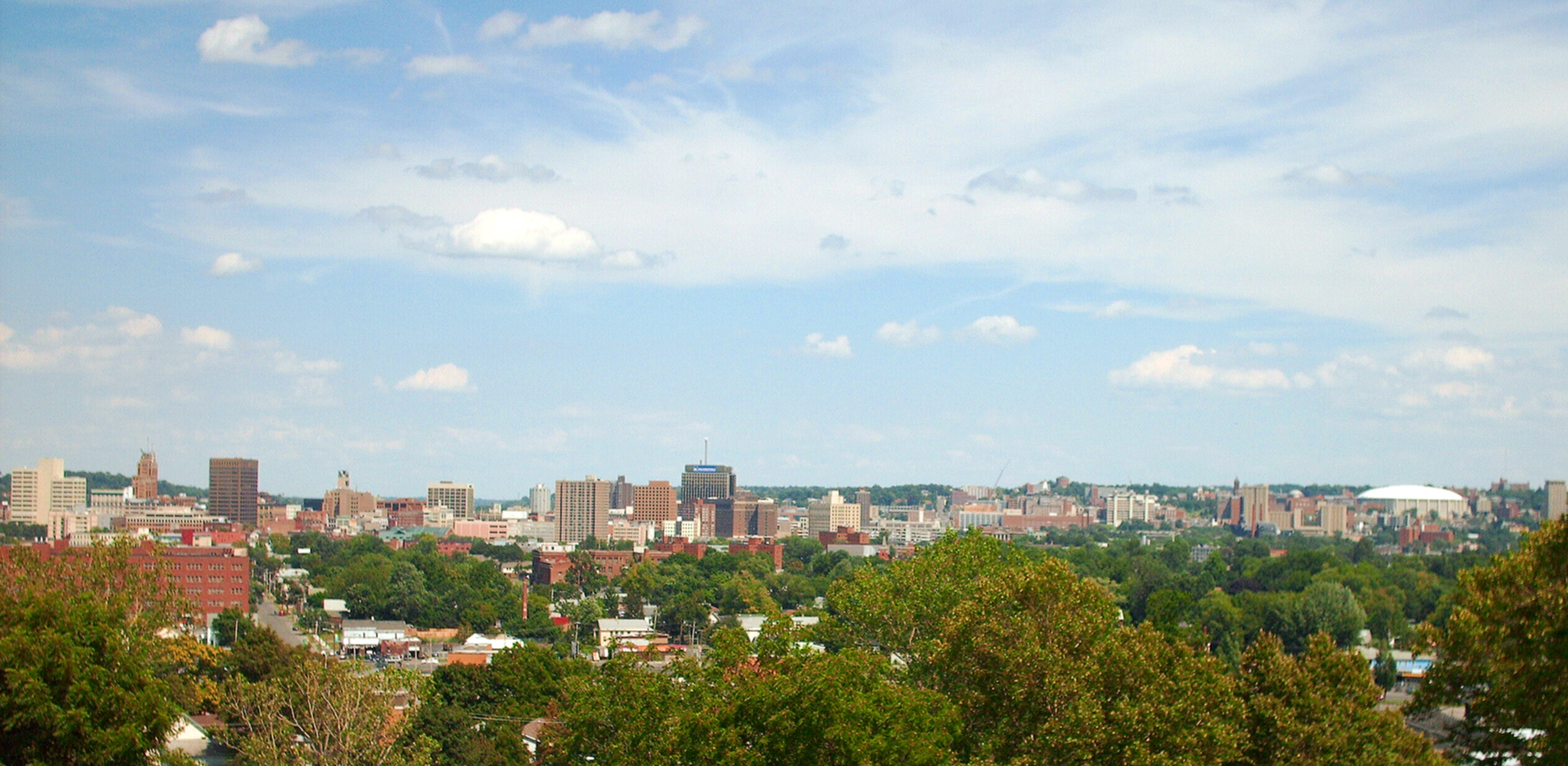
Skyline from northwest, showing downtown at left to Syracuse University's Carrier Dome at right

Work Area Profile Report

Worker Age

	Count	Share(%)
Age 29 or younger	22,597	22.6
Age 30 to 54	53,867	53.8
Age 55 or older	23,694	23.7

Earnings

per month	Count	Share(%)
$1,250 or less	23,734	23.7
$1,251 to $3,333	30,833	30.8
More than $3,333	45,591	45.5

=== Religion ===
Religion	% of Population
Percent religious	56.0%
Catholicism	36.2%
Other Christian	16.3%
Islam	1.4%
Eastern religion (Hinduism, Buddhism, Sikhism)	1.2%
Judaism	0.9%

Christianity: Most Christians in Syracuse are Catholic, reflecting the influence of 19th and early 20th-century immigration patterns, when numerous Irish, German, Italian and eastern European Catholics settled in the city. The city has the Roman Catholic Cathedral of the Immaculate Conception. Syracuse is also home to the combined novitiate of the United States Northeast (UNE) and Maryland Provinces of the Society of Jesus (Jesuits). The historic Basilica of the Sacred Heart of Jesus is located near downtown (Roman Catholic, with Mass, offered in English and Polish). Tridentine Mass is offered multiple times a week at Transfiguration Parish in the Eastside neighborhood.

Another major historic church is the Episcopal St. Paul's Cathedral. Both cathedrals are located at Columbus Circle. They represent their respective dioceses, the Diocese of Syracuse (Roman Catholic) and the Diocese of Central New York (Episcopal).

The Assembly of God, the American Baptist Churches of the US, the Southern Baptist Convention, and the United Church of Christ are other Protestant denominations, and they have their state offices in the Greater Syracuse area. The dozens of churches in Syracuse include Seventh-Day Adventist, Eastern Orthodox, Jehovah's Witness, Christian Science, Reformed Presbyterian, and Metaphysical Christian.

Buddhism: Buddhism is represented by the Zen Center of Syracuse on the Seneca Turnpike; as well as a center on Park Street, on the city's Northside.

Hinduism: Hindu houses of worship include the Hindu Mandir of Central New York in Liverpool.

Islam: The Islamic Society of Central New York Mosque is located on Comstock Avenue and Muhammad's Study Group on West Kennedy Street.

Judaism: Several synagogues are located in the Syracuse metropolitan area, including Congregation Beth Shalom-Chevra Chas, Temple Adath-Yeshurun, Shaarei Torah Orthodox Congregation of Syracuse, and Temple Concord, considered the ninth-oldest Jewish house of worship in the United States.

Sikhism: The gurdwara is at the Sikh Foundation of Syracuse, in Liverpool.

Unitarian Universalism: Two Unitarian Universalist societies in Syracuse: May Memorial Unitarian Society and First Unitarian Universalist Society of Syracuse.

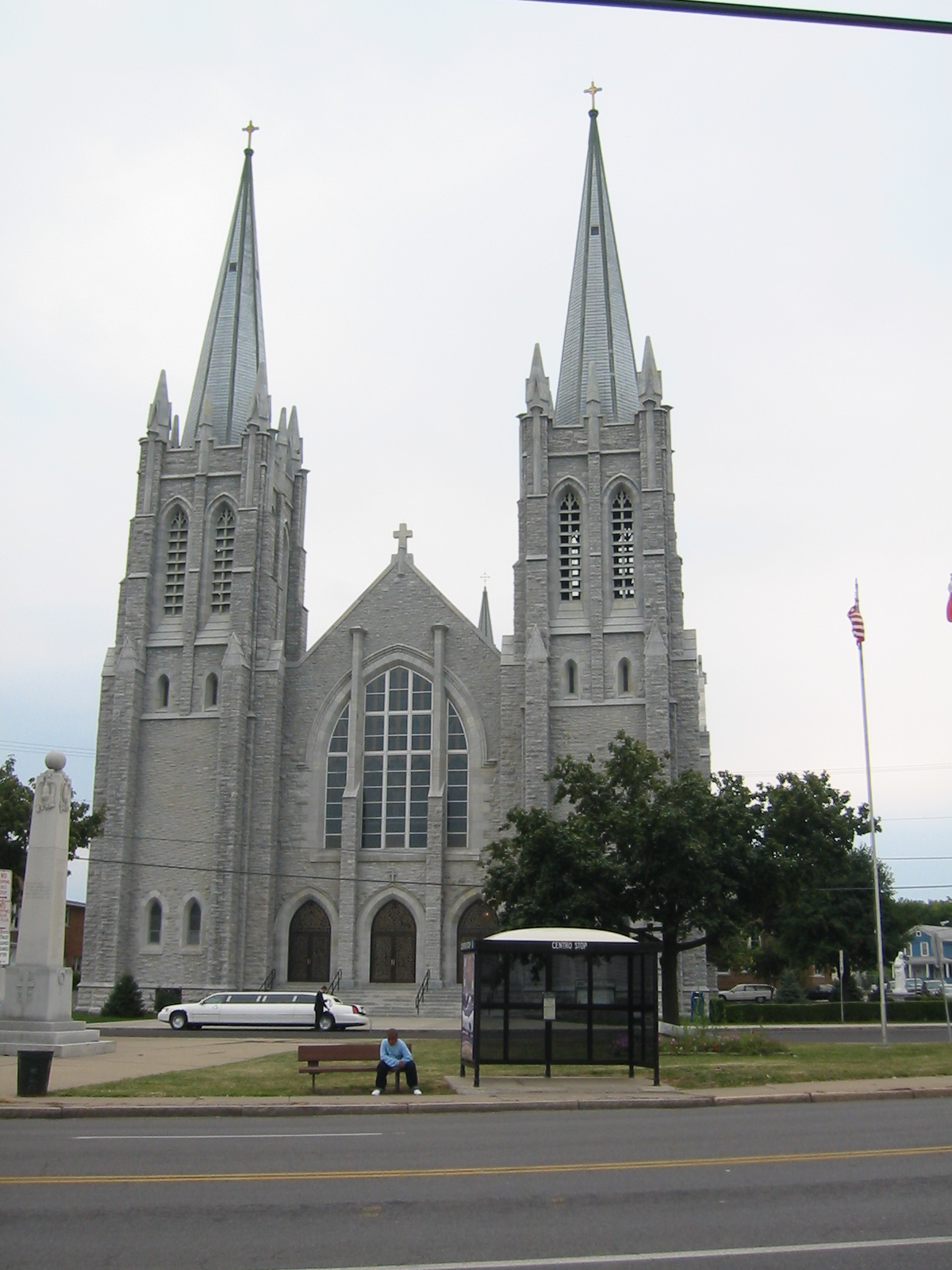
Basilica of the Sacred Heart of Jesus

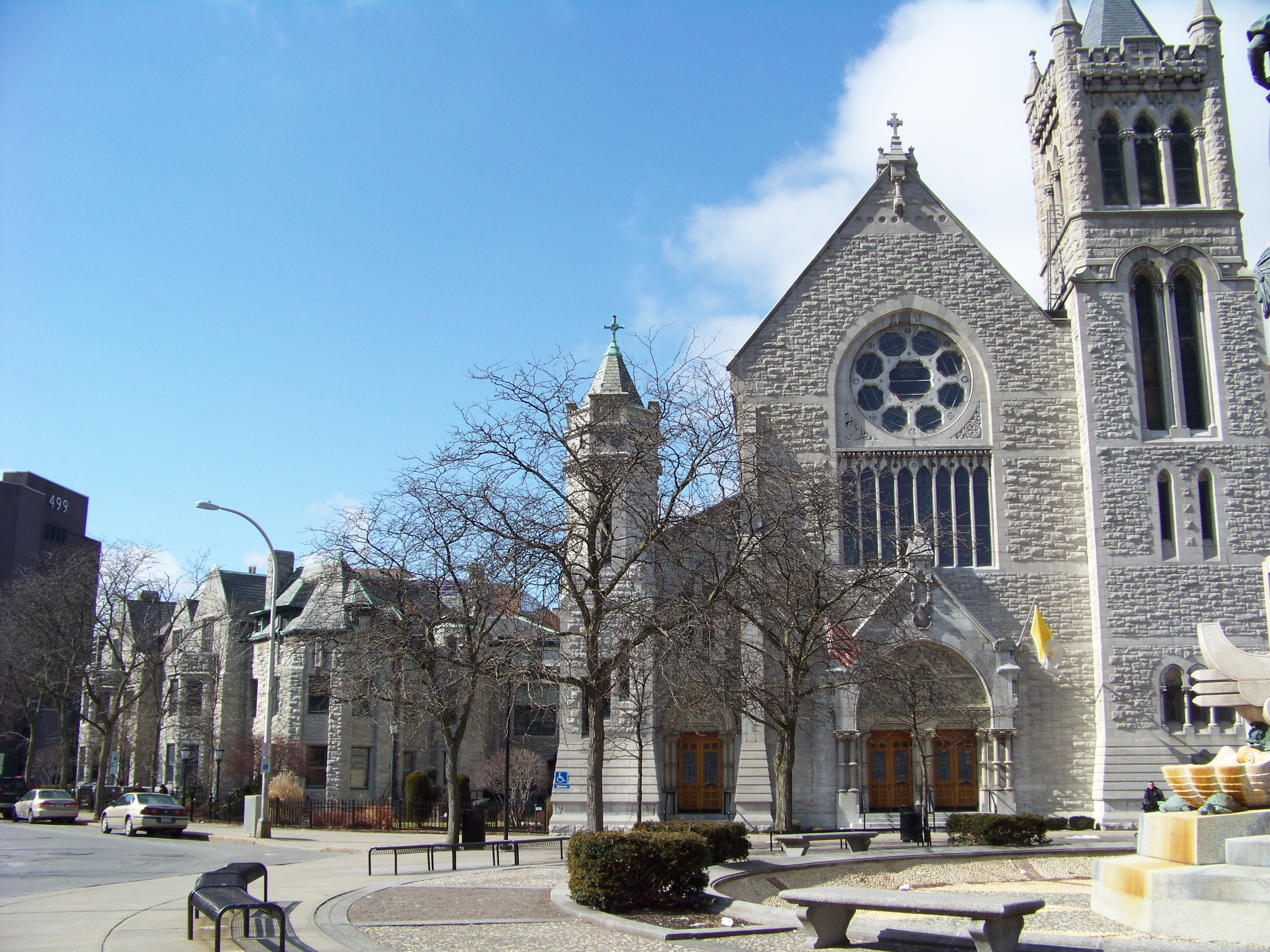
Cathedral of the Immaculate Conception

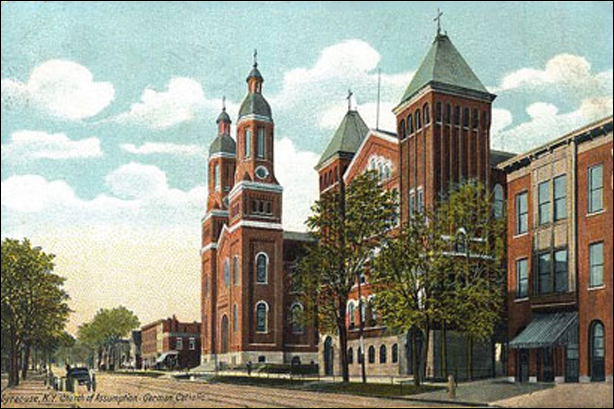
Assumption Church

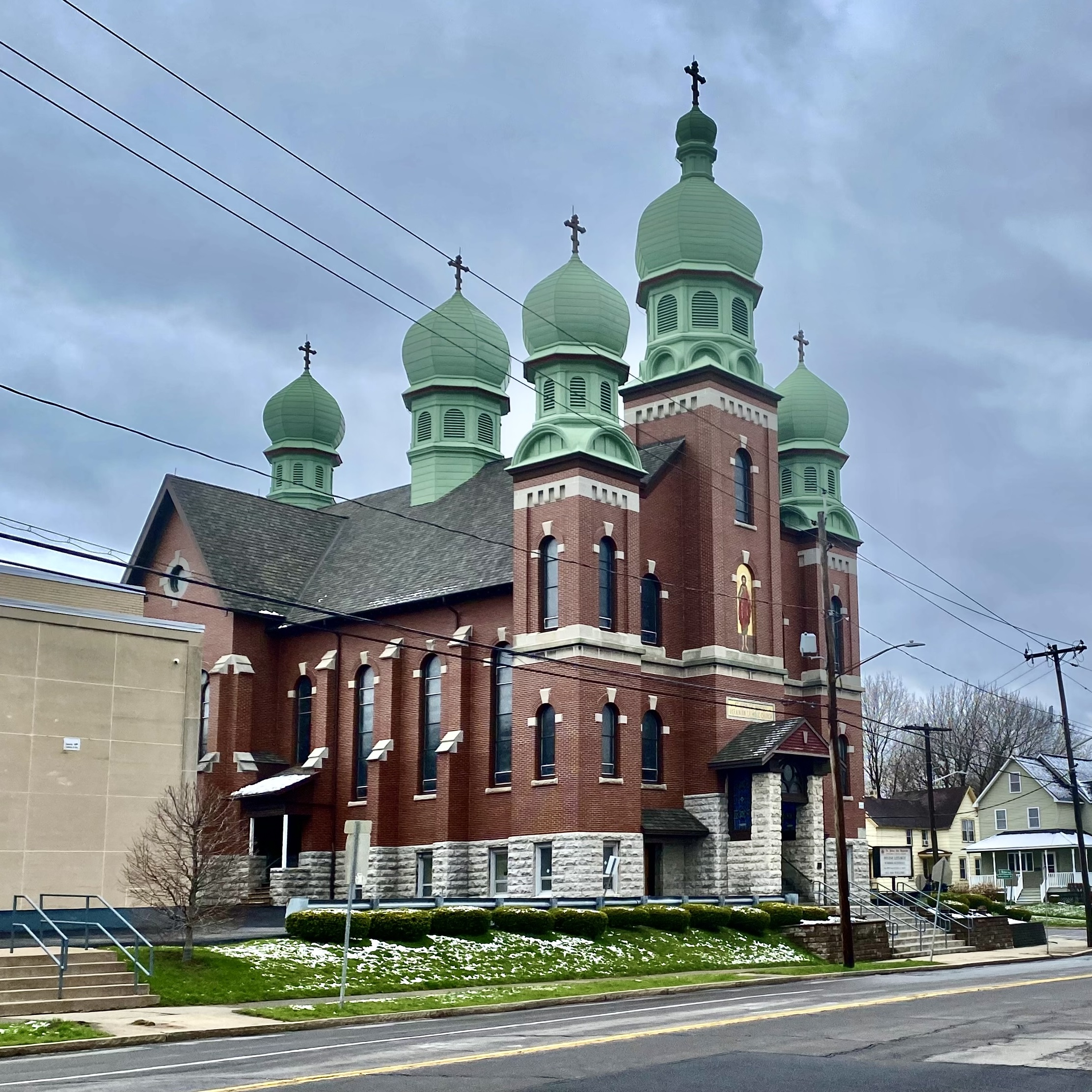
St. John the Baptist Greek Catholic Church

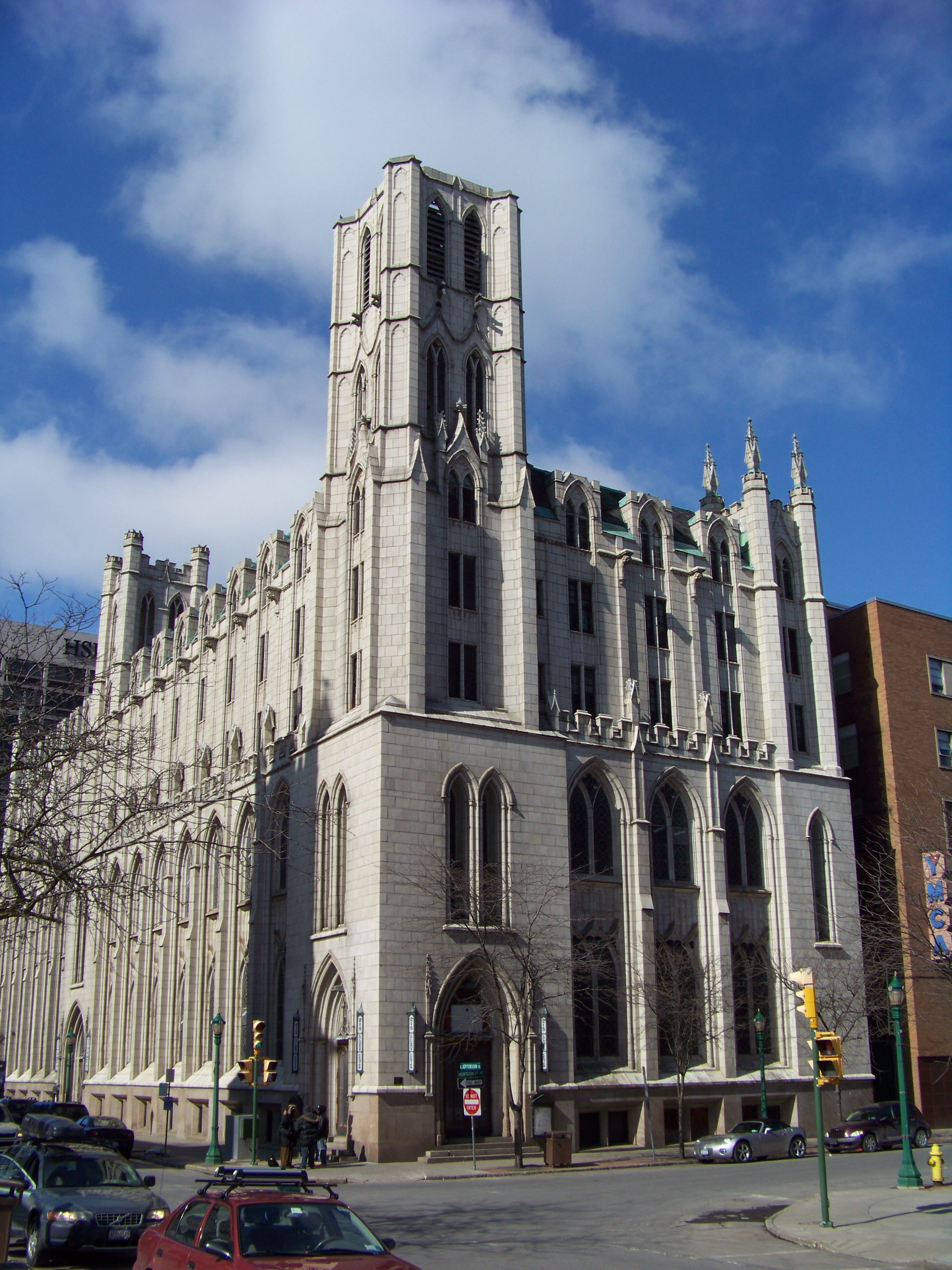
First Baptist Church

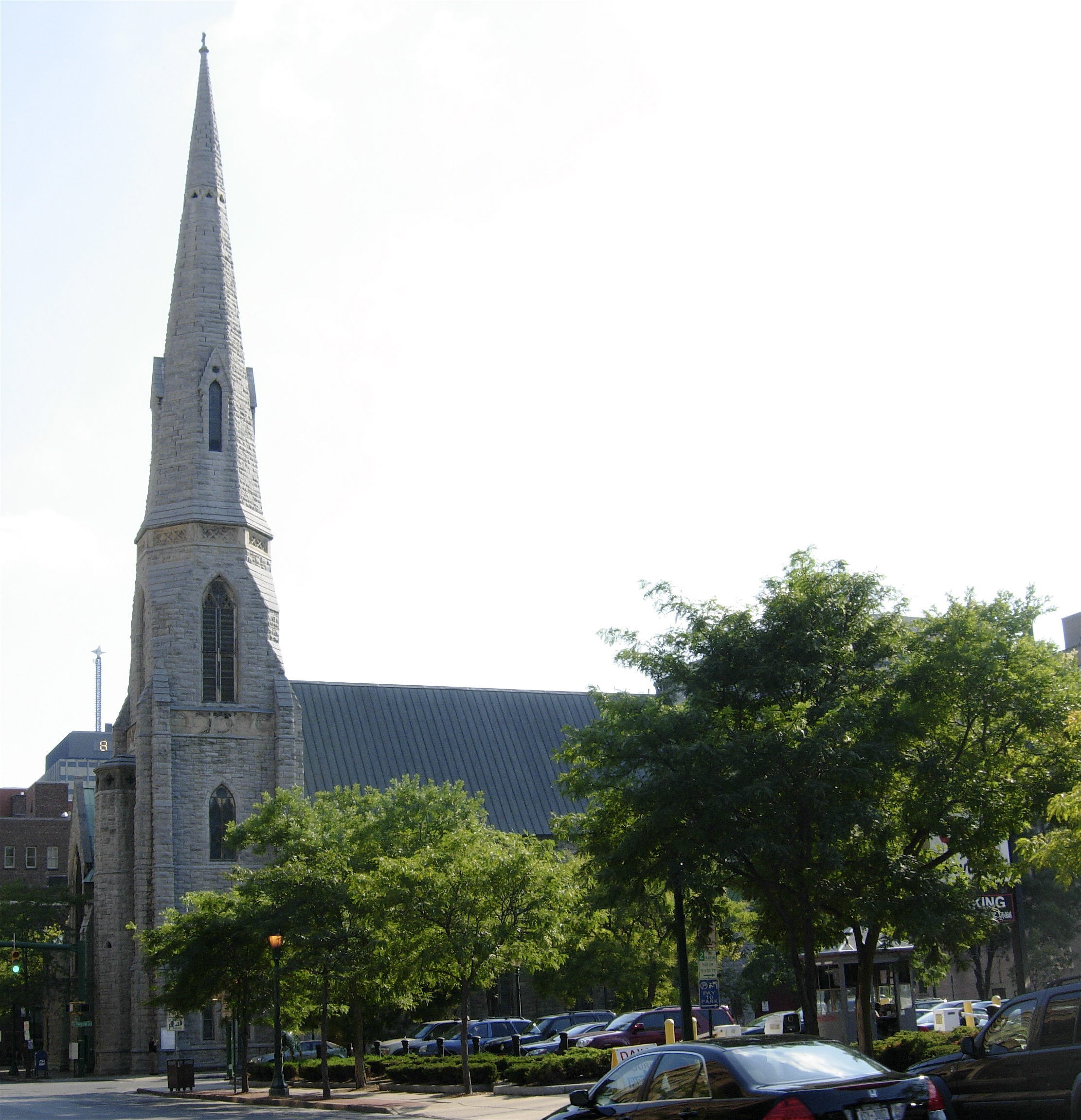
Saint Paul's Episcopal Cathedral

== Economy ==
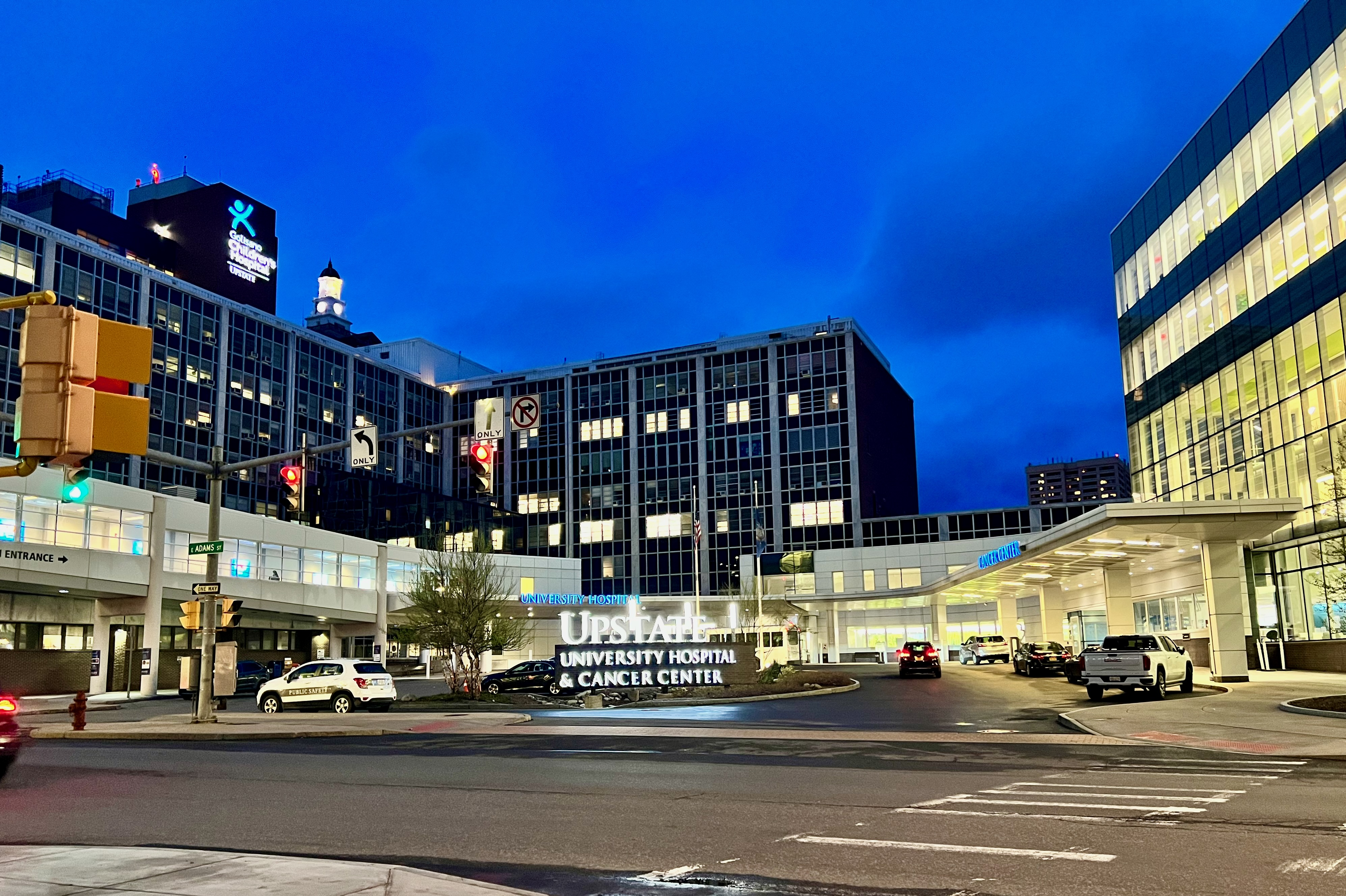
State University of New York Upstate Medical University located in Downtown Syracuse.

Formerly a manufacturing center, Syracuse's economy has faced challenges over the past decades as industrial jobs have left the area. The number of local and state government jobs also has been declining for several years. Syracuse's top employers now are primarily in higher education, research, health care and services; some high-tech manufacturing remains. University Hill is Syracuse's fastest-growing neighborhood, fueled by expansions by Syracuse University and Upstate Medical University (a division of the State University of New York), as well as dozens of small medical office complexes.

=== Micron Technology semiconductor mega-complex ===
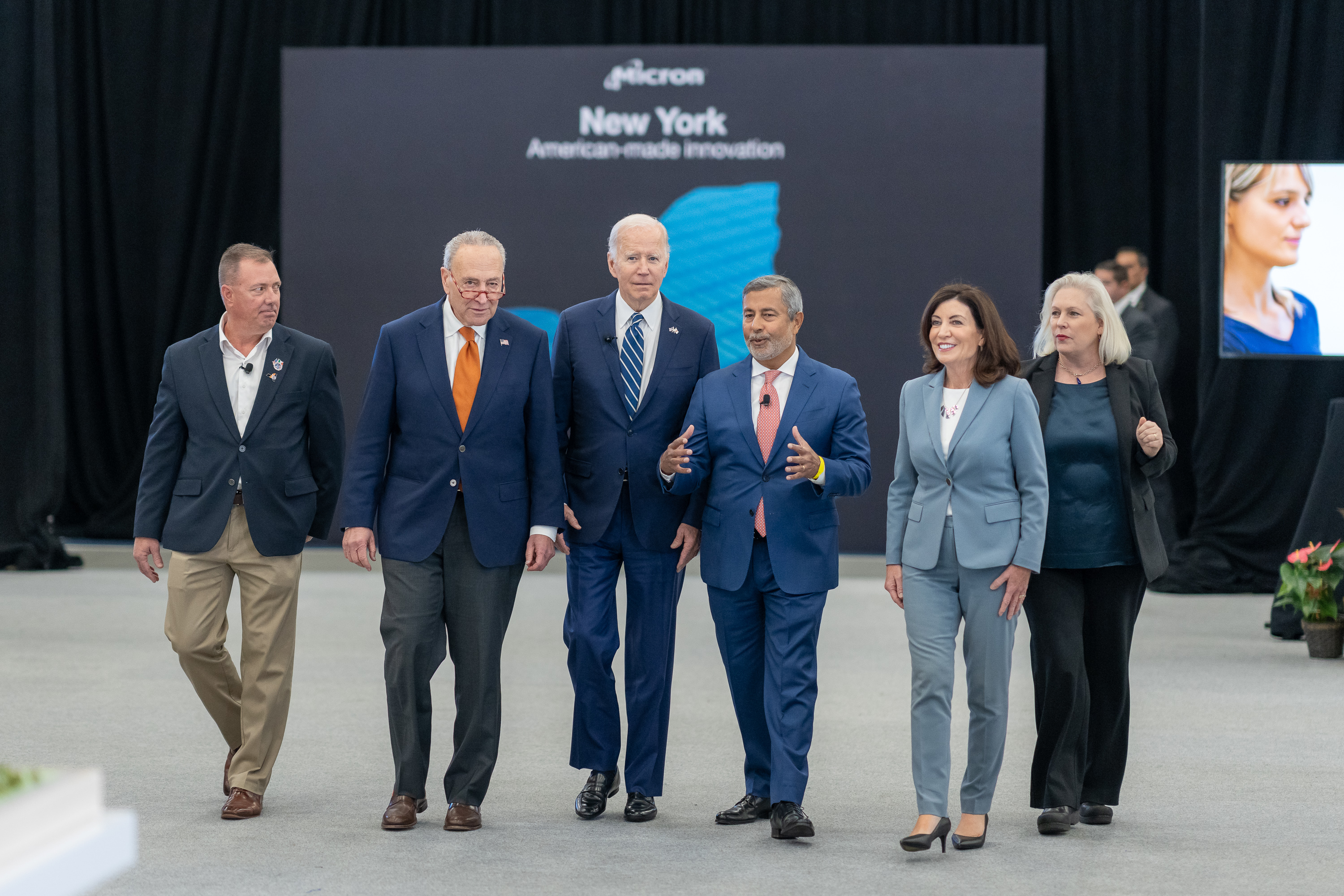
President Joe Biden tours Micron exhibits with Gov. Kathy Hochul, Sen. Kirsten Gillibrand, Micron CEO Sanjay Mehrotra and Sen. Chuck Schumer, in Syracuse.

Pursuant to the CHIPS and Science Act of 2022, Micron Technology plans to spend up to $100 billion building a mega-complex of computer chip plants in Syracuse's northern suburbs, about a 15-minute drive from downtown Syracuse, in what would be the largest single private investment in New York history.

In 2024, Micron Technology began construction of the Clay mega-complex of memory chip fabs which would create up to 9,000 direct jobs and additional 40,000 supply-chain and construction jobs over the next 20 years in Syracuse area. In Phase 1, the company will spend $20 billion to build its first plant, which it estimates will require about 5,000 workers for construction and initially employ about 3,000 manufacturing workers.

=== Top employers ===
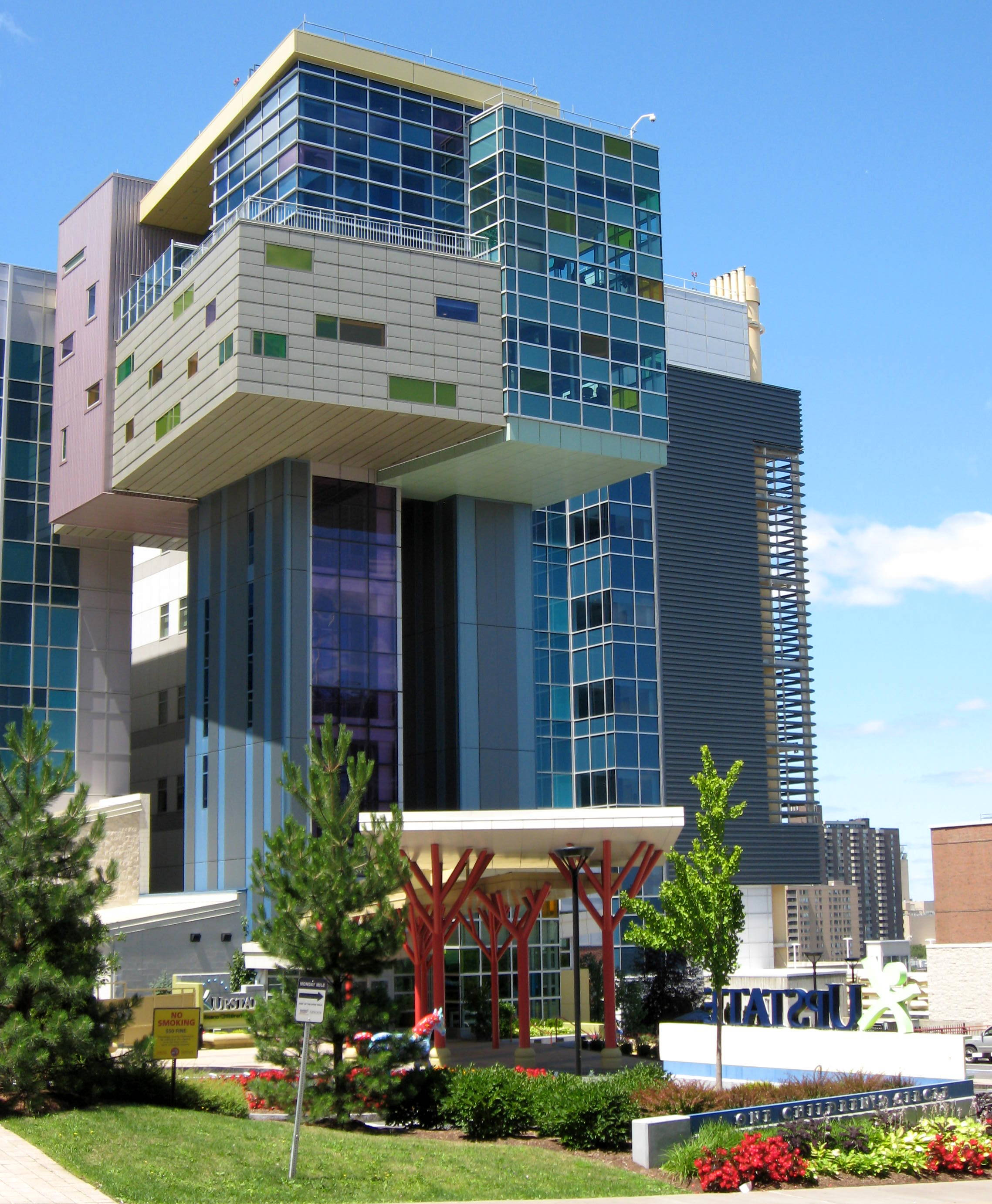
Upstate Children's Hospital at Upstate Medical University

Top employers in the Syracuse region and the size of their workforce include the following:

- State University of New York Upstate Medical University: 10,959
- Syracuse University: 5,700
- St. Joseph's Health (Syracuse, New York) (Trinity Health): 4,755
- Wegmans Food Markets: 3,713
- Crouse Hospital: 3,100
- Amazon 2,500
- Loretto (elder care services): 2,476
- Lockheed Martin Corp.: 2,300
- National Grid USA: 2,200
- Carrier Corporation: 1,552
- SRC Inc 1,500
- Syracuse VA Medical Center (Veterans Health): 1,400
- Baxter (Welch Allyn) 1000

=== Tallest buildings ===
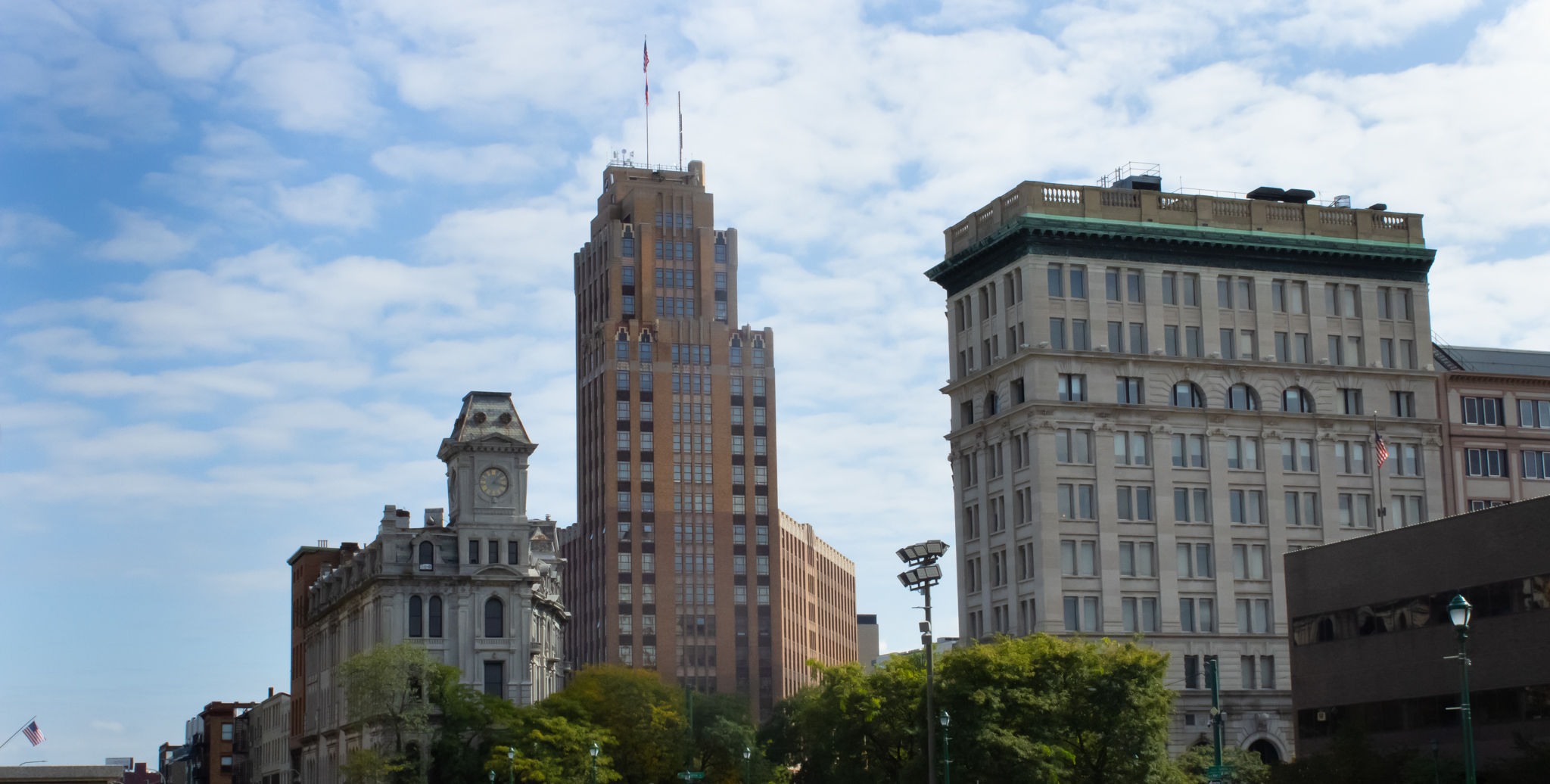
State Tower Building on Clinton Square

Since 1927 the State Tower Building has been the tallest in Syracuse.

Name	Height	Floors	Use	Built
State Tower Building	95 m	23	Office	1928
AXA Tower I	82 m	19	Commercial office	1966
AXA Tower II	82 m	19	Commercial office	1971

=== Business districts ===
In addition to the dominant Destiny USA shopping mall in Syracuse's Lakefront neighborhood, many of the city's more traditional neighborhoods continue to have active business districts:

- Downtown: Armory Square has replaced South Salina Street as the main retail and dining area of Downtown Syracuse. Armory Square has around 30 dining establishments, around 20 pubs, bars and clubs, and over 50 other retail stores. Similarly, but on a smaller scale, there is the Hanover Square area.
- Eastwood: Calling itself "the village within the city", this former village still has a retail corridor along James Street.
- Little Italy: A neighborhood with Italian origins, Little Italy (part of the Near Northeast neighborhood) has several blocks of bakeries, restaurants, pizzerias, shops, and services. Before large-scale Italian immigration, this neighbourhood was heavily populated by German immigrants.
- Sedgwick Farms: An affluent neighborhood on the northeast side of the city near Eastwood containing many architecturally-distinct, large, classic homes including a Sears Home designed by many noted architects. The neighborhood has historically been home to city leaders, state politicians, and leaders in Syracuse's industry and economy.
- Strathmore: A neighborhood on the southwest of the city that largely features well-maintained older, residential homes, including some designed by Ward Wellington Ward. There are several buildings listed on the National Register of Historic Places. The neighborhood is anchored by Hiawatha lake in Onondaga Park.
- University Hill: Marshall Street, along with its terminus South Crouse Avenue, is lined with stores, bars, and restaurants, primarily catering to the student population on "The Hill", as well as the over 25,000 people who work there daily. East Genesee Street at the northwestern corner of the neighborhood has several retail establishments, as well.
- Westcott: This neighborhood east of University Hill is inhabited by a wide variety of people, increasingly including some college students as the university grows but still primarily local families and residents. Single-family homes and two-unit apartments comprise the majority of housing. Westcott is known as a bohemian and liberal quarter, and each September hosts the Westcott Street Cultural Fair. The main business district is on Westcott Street between Beech and Dell streets and includes restaurants, bars, a consignment shop, and other businesses.
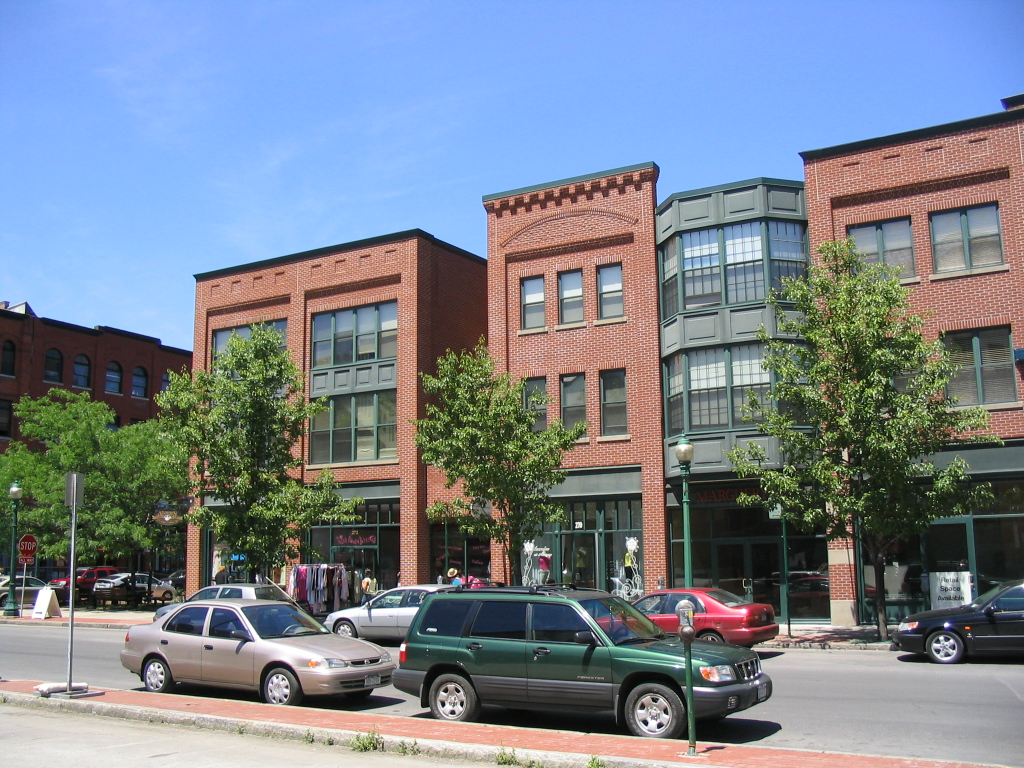
Armory Square

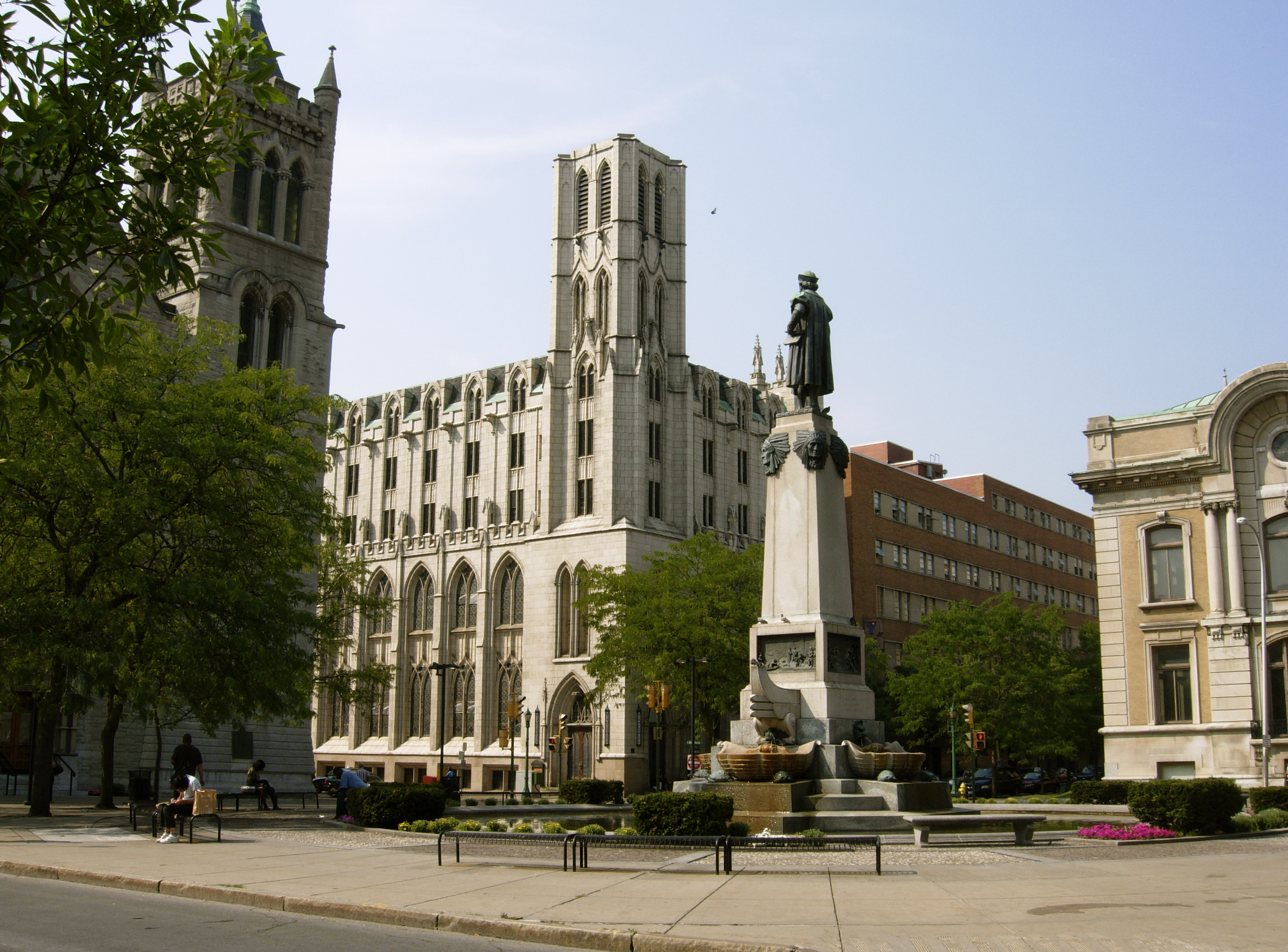
Columbus Circle, Syracuse, NY

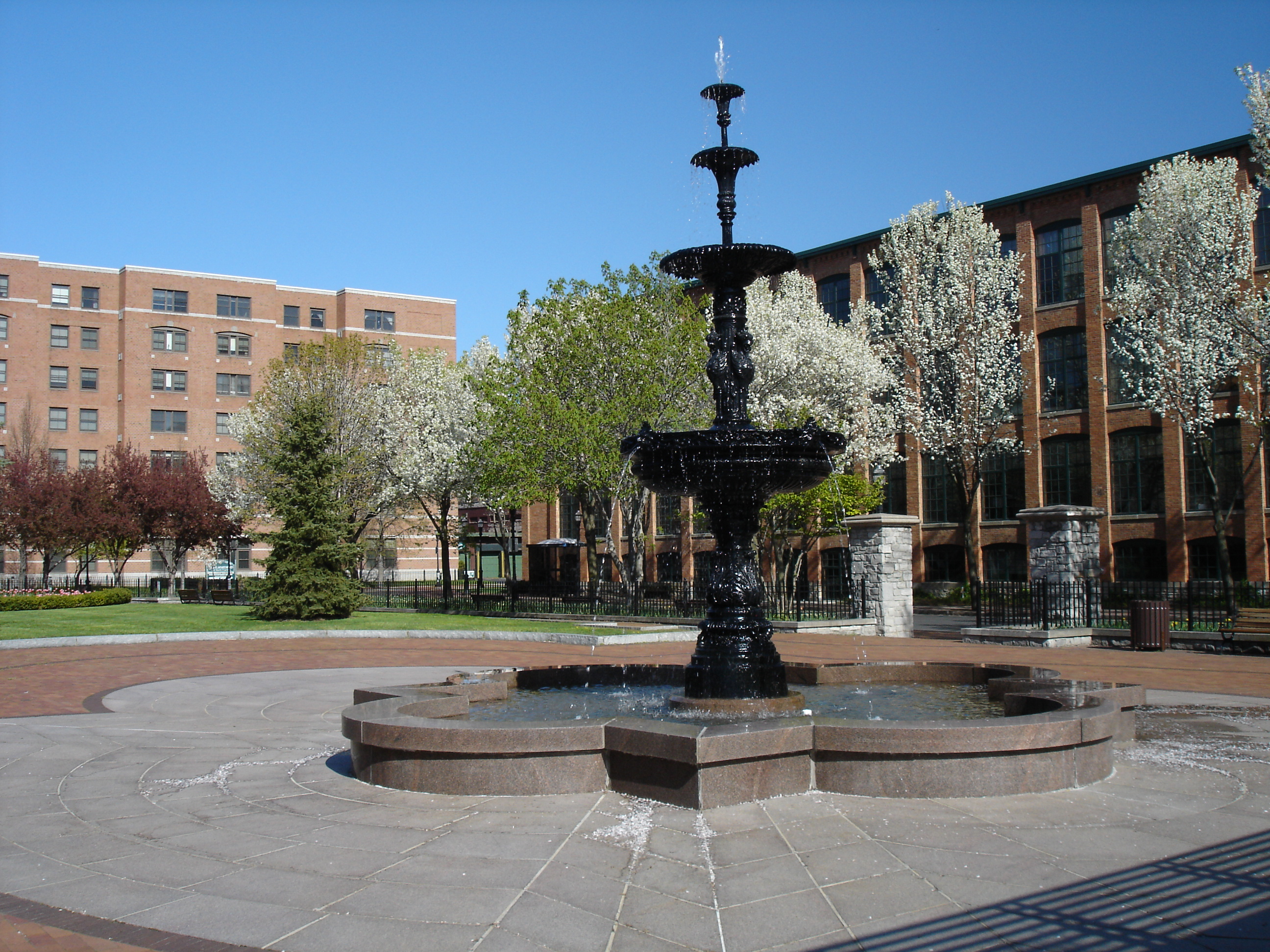
Franklin Square, Syracuse

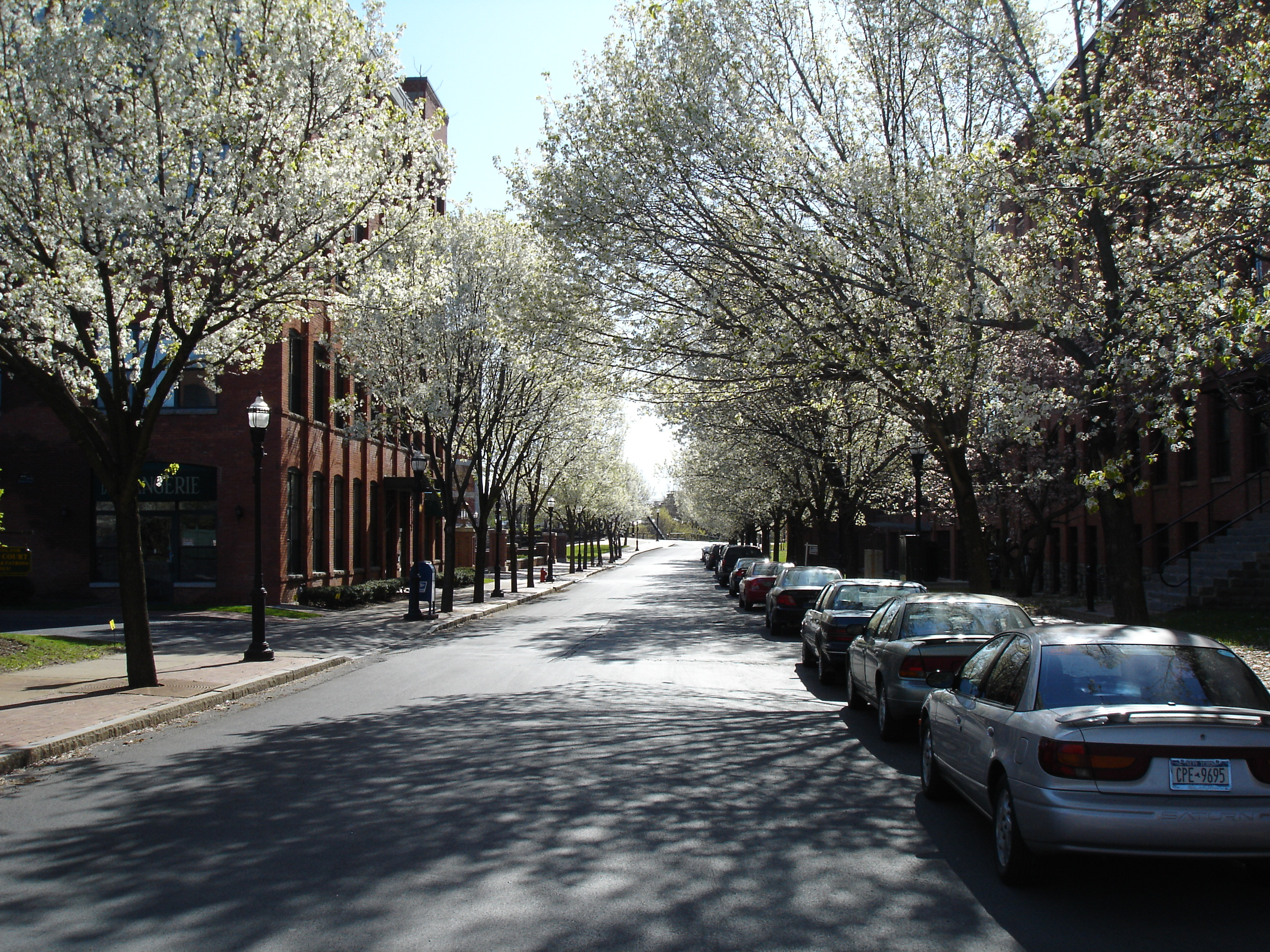
Franklin Square

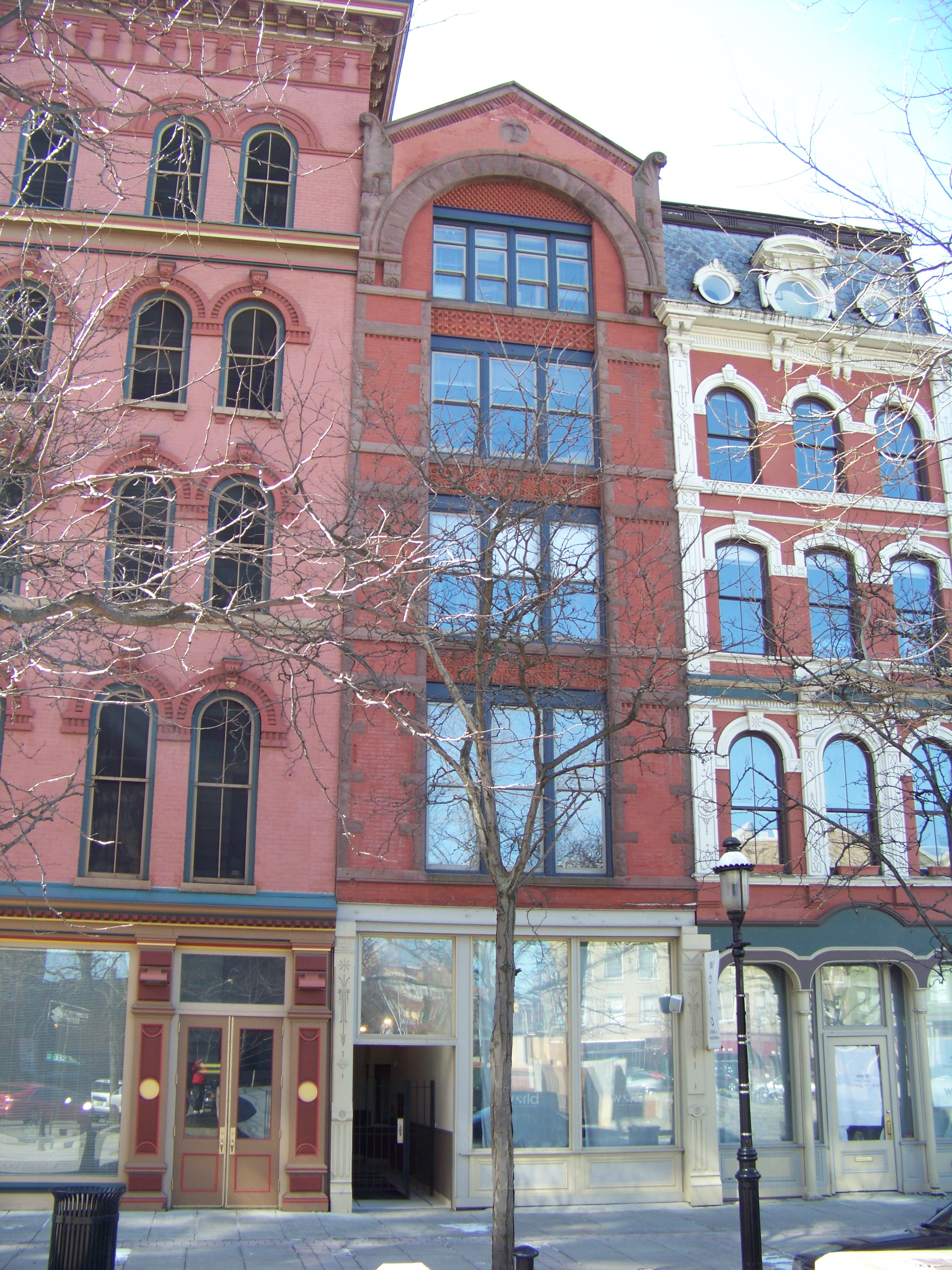
Buildings in Downtown

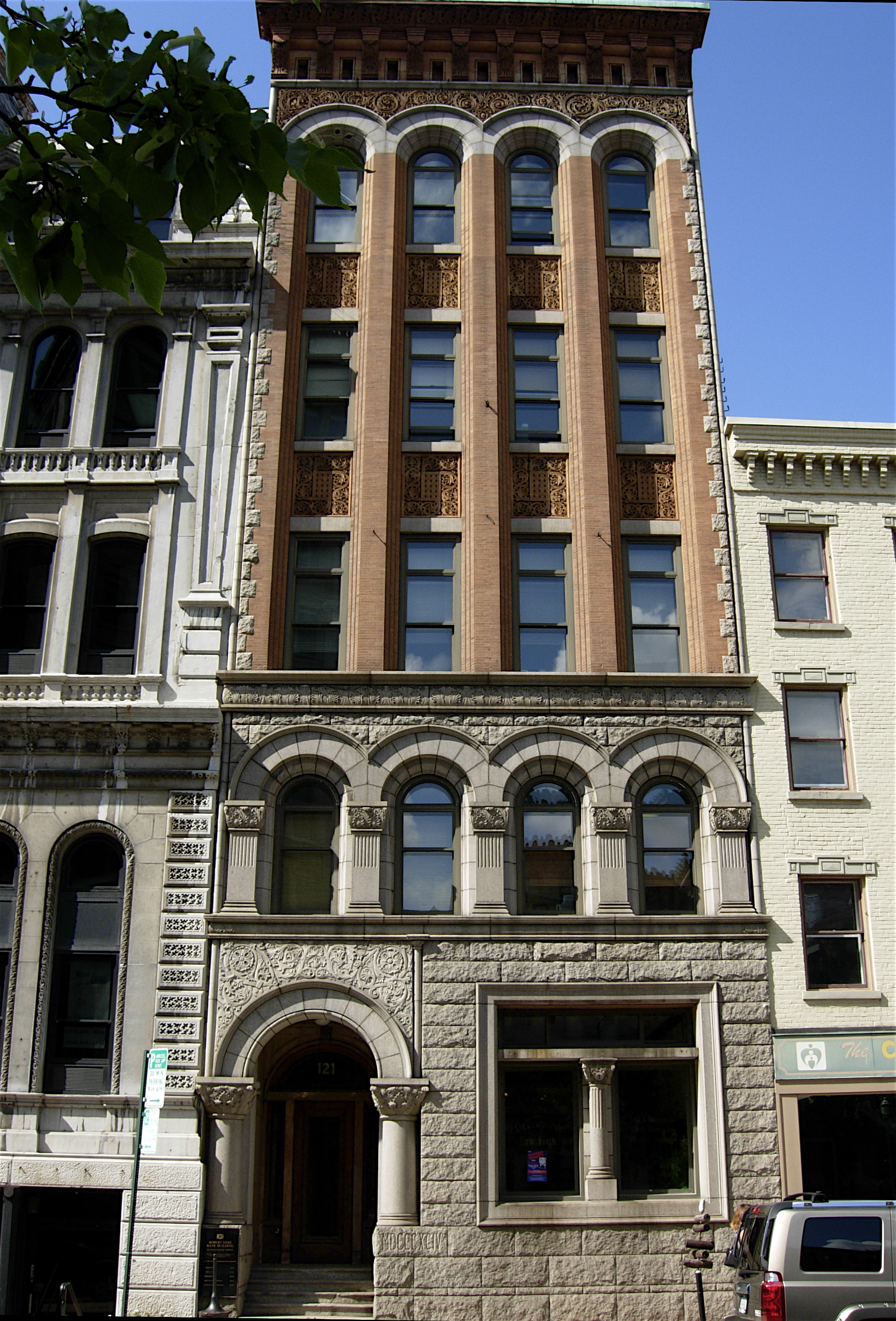
Gere Bank Building

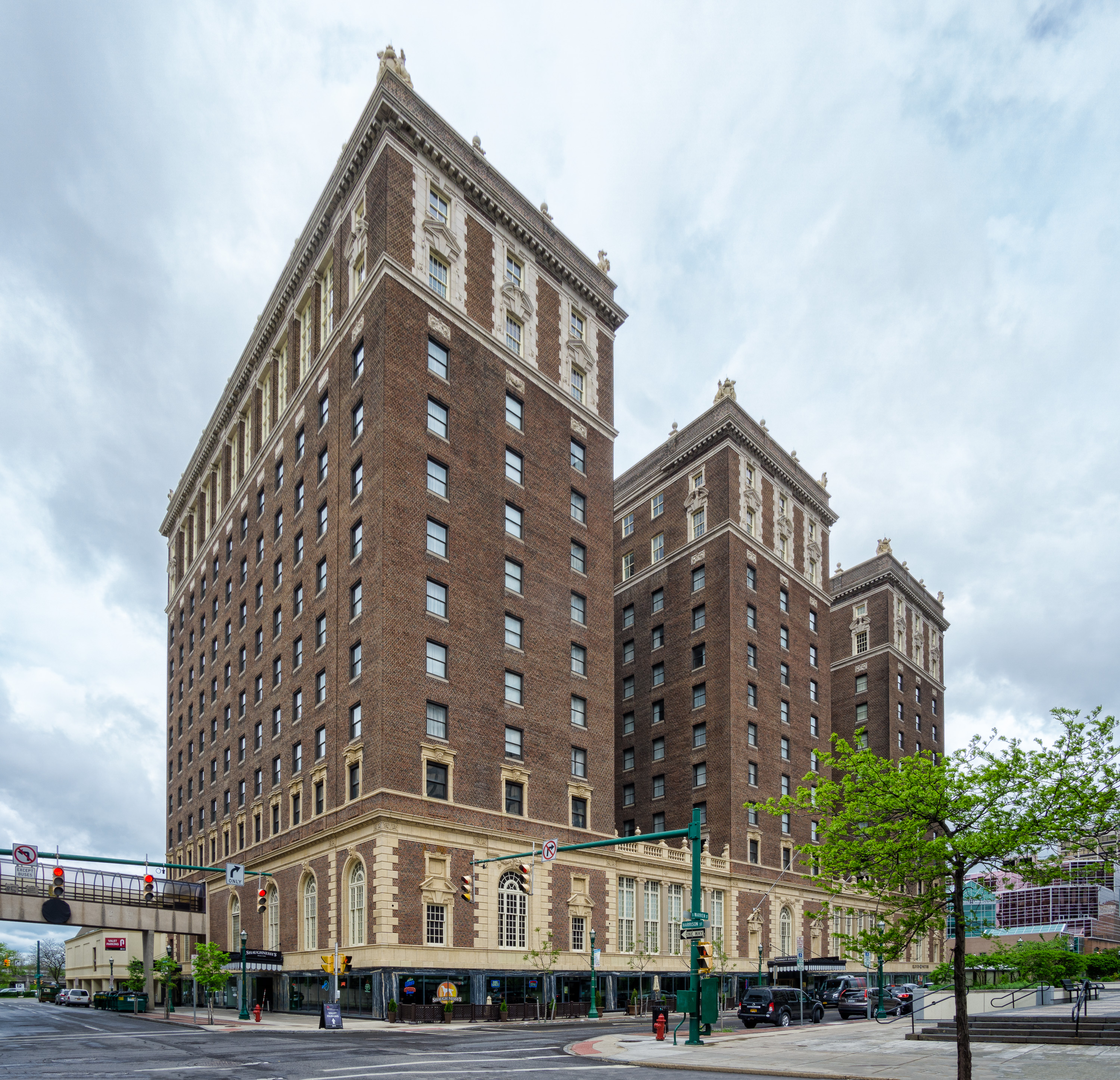
Hotel Syracuse Downtown

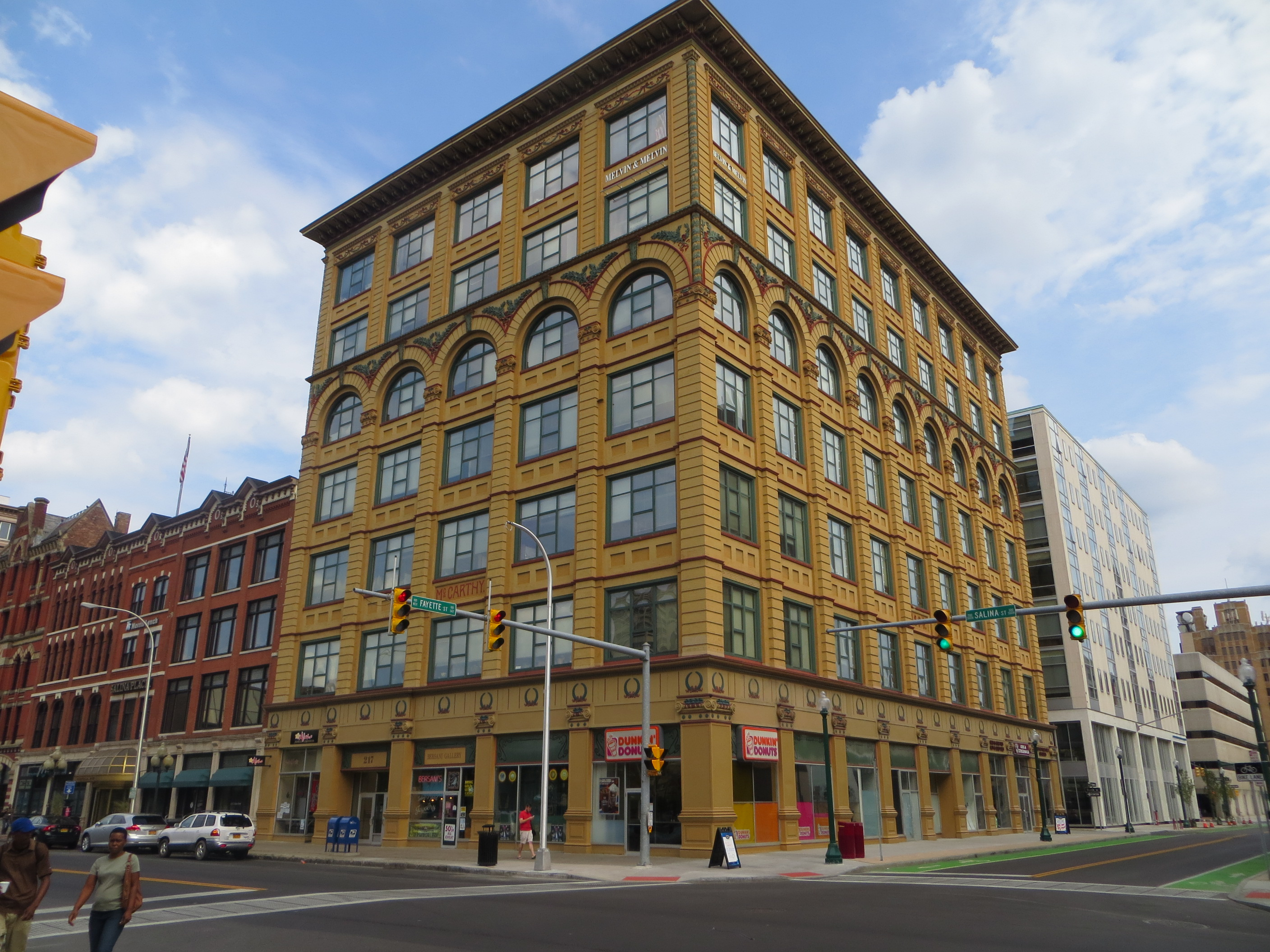
South Salina Street Downtown Historic District

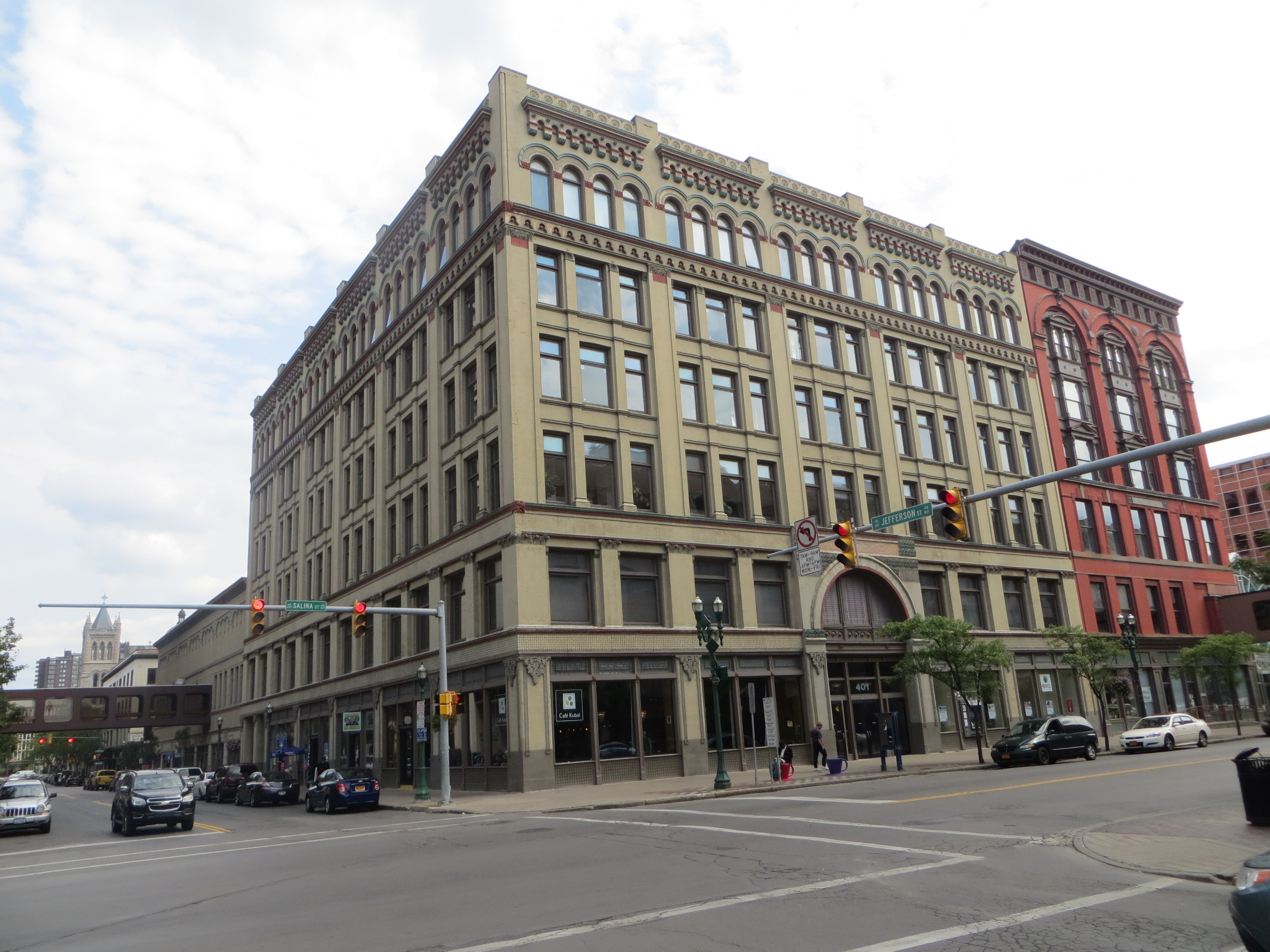
South Salina Street Downtown Historic District

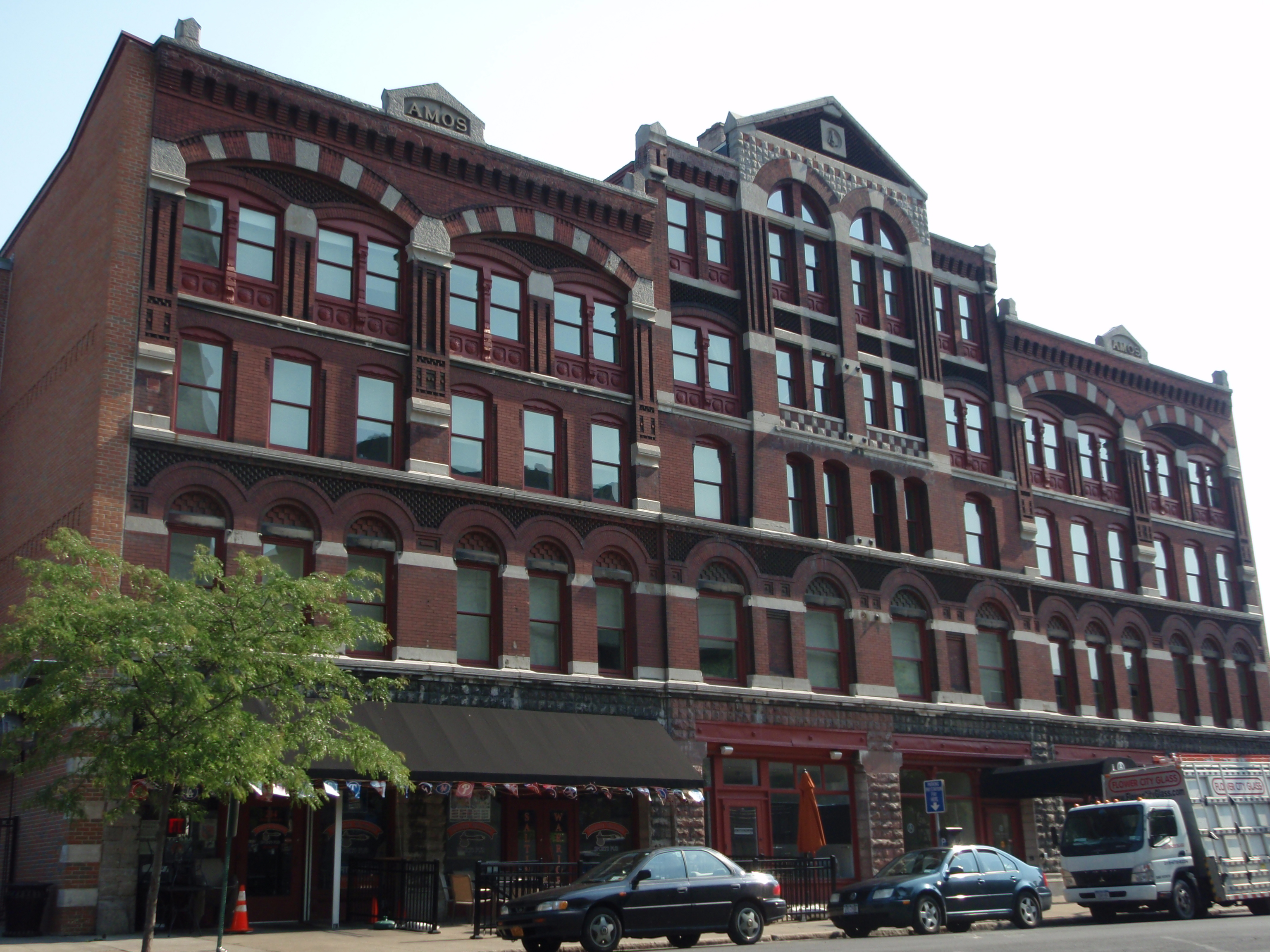
The Amos Block building in downtown

== Arts and culture ==
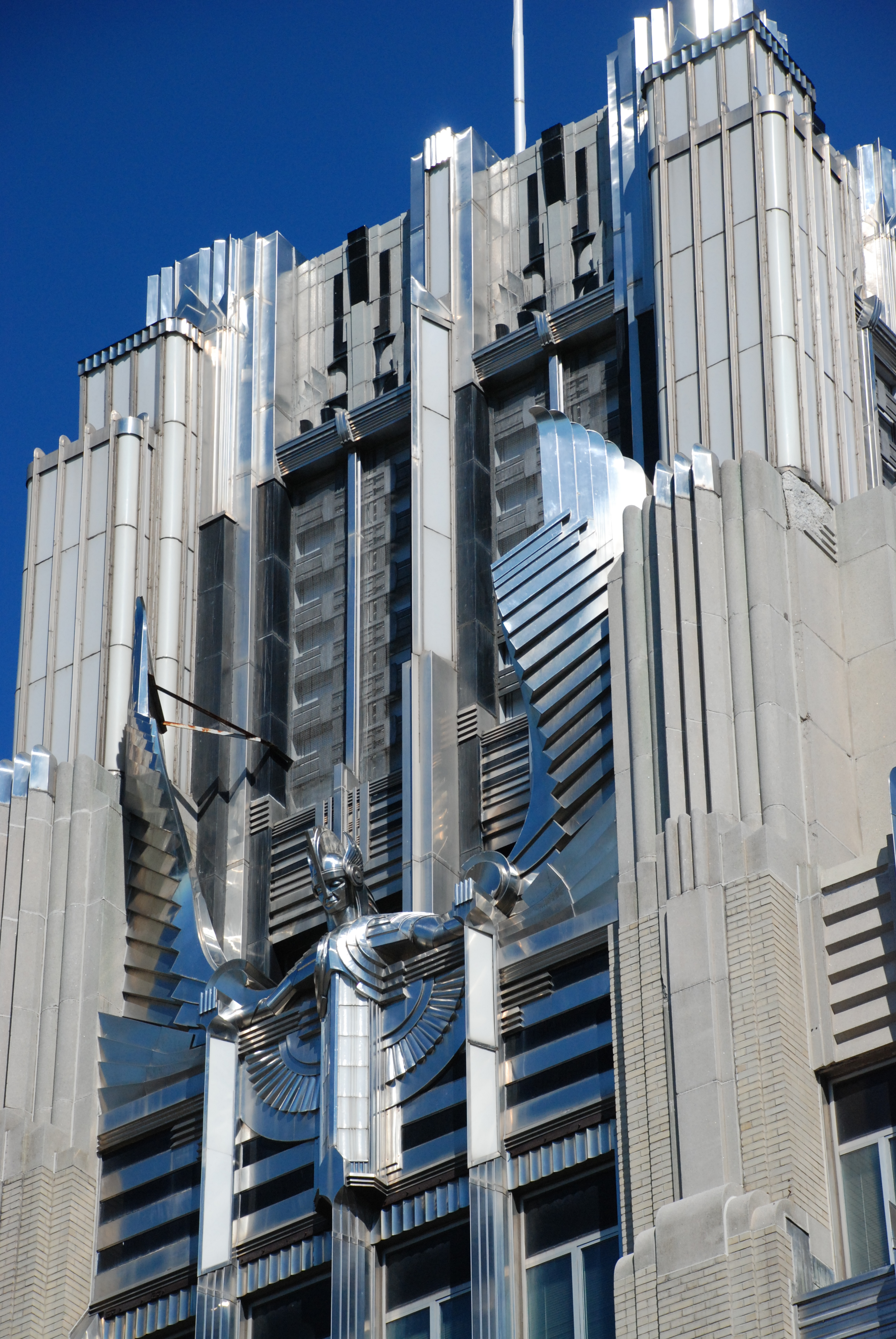
The Niagara Mohawk Building (now owned by National Grid USA), an example of art deco, listed in 2010 on the National Register of Historic Places

=== Performing arts ===
Live jazz music is the centerpiece of two annual outdoor festivals in Syracuse, the Syracuse Jazz Festival, Polish Festival as well as the CNY Jazz Arts Foundation's Jazz in the Square Festival. Past performers have included Chuck Mangione, Joshua Redman, Smokey Robinson, Branford Marsalis, The Bad Plus, Randy Brecker, Stanley Clarke, Jimmy Heath, Terrence Blanchard, Slide Hampton, Bobby Watson, Dr. John, and Aretha Franklin. The Polish Festival hosted Grammy winners Jimmy Sturr and his Orchestra, Polish music legend Stan Borys and Irena Jarocka, Grammy nominee Lenny Goumulka, LynnMarie, Dennis Polisky & The Maestro's Men, The Buffalo Touch Polka Band featuring Jerry Darlak, and The John Gora Band.

Syracuse was home to the 75-member Syracuse Symphony Orchestra (SSO), founded in 1961. The SSO's former music directors include Daniel Hege, Frederik Prausnitz and Kazuyoshi Akiyama. The orchestra performed over 200 concerts annually for an audience of over 250,000. The SSO filed for Chapter 7 Bankruptcy in 2011 and was replaced by the Syracuse Symphoria in 2013.

The Clinton String Quartet has been active for over 15 years and is based in the Syracuse area. All four members were also members of the Syracuse Symphony Orchestra.

The Syracuse Friends of Chamber Music for more than a half century have presented a series of concerts by various chamber ensembles.

The Society for New Music, founded in 1971, is the oldest new music organization in the state outside of New York City, and the only year-round new music group in upstate New York. The Society commissions at least one new work each year from a regional composer who awards the annual Brian Israel Prize to a promising composer under 30 years of age and produces the weekly "Fresh Ink" radio broadcast for WCNY-FM.

The Syracuse Opera Company was a professional company that generally performed three operas each season. Founded in 1963 as the Opera Chorus of the Syracuse Symphony Orchestra, it became independent in 1973. In addition to full performances, it offered several free outdoor concerts each year in Armory Square, Thornden Park, and elsewhere. The company had an annual budget of US$1 million and filed for bankruptcy in December 2025.

The Syracuse Shakespeare Festival is a charitable, educational, not-for-profit corporation dedicated to performing the works of William Shakespeare. It was founded in 2002 and is best known for its annual free Shakespeare-in-the-Park program at the Thornden Park Amphitheatre that has attracted more than 12,000 people since its inception.

Syracuse Stage presents experimental and creative theater; a number of its productions have been world premieres and have moved to Broadway. The venue was designed by its most famous former artistic director Arthur Storch. Its artistic director is Robert Hupp.

The Red House Arts Center, which opened in 2004, is a small theater housed in a converted hotel that offers performances by local, national, and international artists, and hosts regular exhibits in its art gallery, and screenings of independent films.

Syracuse is also known for a large contemporary music scene, particularly in the heavy metal, hardcore, ska, and punk rock genres. From 1997 to 2003, Syracuse (or its suburbs) was home to Hellfest, a major hardcore music festival.

=== Museums and art galleries ===
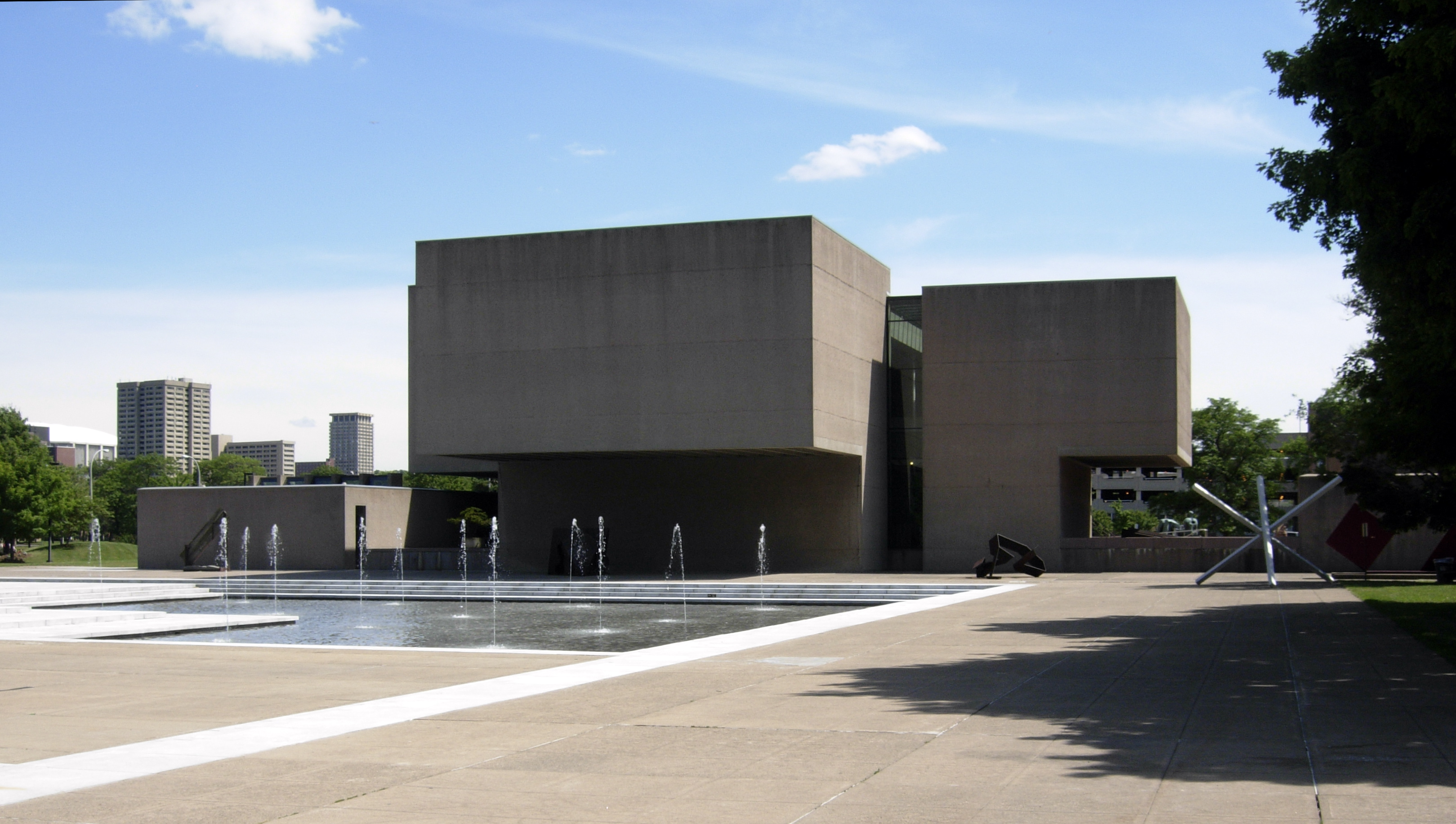
Everson Museum of Art

- Everson Museum of Art, which opened in 1968 in a building designed by I.M. Pei, features one of the most extensive pottery collections in the United States along with works of American art, dating from the 18th century to the present. This collection includes paintings, sculptures, drawings, photography, and video.
- Erie Canal Museum is a museum dedicated to preserving the history of the Erie Canal and its role in Syracuse's growth.
- Milton J. Rubenstein Museum of Science and Technology is a museum in the Armory Square neighborhood that features exhibits in science and technology.
- Onondaga Historical Association Museum & Research Center, at 321 Montgomery Street downtown, features exhibits on the past of the Syracuse region and contains historical archives relating to the area's history. Its exhibits include a presentation of the history of the Underground Railroad.
- Syracuse and Onondaga County Fire Museum, will occupy the space of the former Syracuse Fire Department fire station 4 on Wolf Street, built in the 1800s (plans announced October 2020).

=== Public libraries ===
Onondaga County Public Library (OCPL) operates Syracuse's public libraries. Including the Central Library, ten city libraries, and 21 independent libraries in suburban Onondaga County. A library card from any OCPL library will work at any of the other OCPL libraries.

City libraries

- Central Library
- Beauchamp Branch Library
- Betts Branch Library
- Hazard Branch Library
- Mundy Branch Library
- Northeast Community Center Library
- Paine Branch Library
- Petit Branch Library
- Soule Branch Library
- Southwest Community Center Library
- White Branch Library

Suburban libraries

- Baldwinsville Public Library
- Brewerton NOPL
- Cicero NOPL
- DeWitt Community Library
- East Syracuse Free Library
- Elbridge Free Library
- Fairmount Community Library
- Fayetteville Free Library
- Jordan Bramley Library
- LaFayette Public Library
- Liverpool Public Library
- Manlius Library
- Marcellus Free Library
- Maxwell Memorial Library
- Minoa Library
- North Syracuse NOPL
- Onondaga Free Library
- Salina Library
- Skaneateles Library
- Solvay Public Library
- Tully Free Library
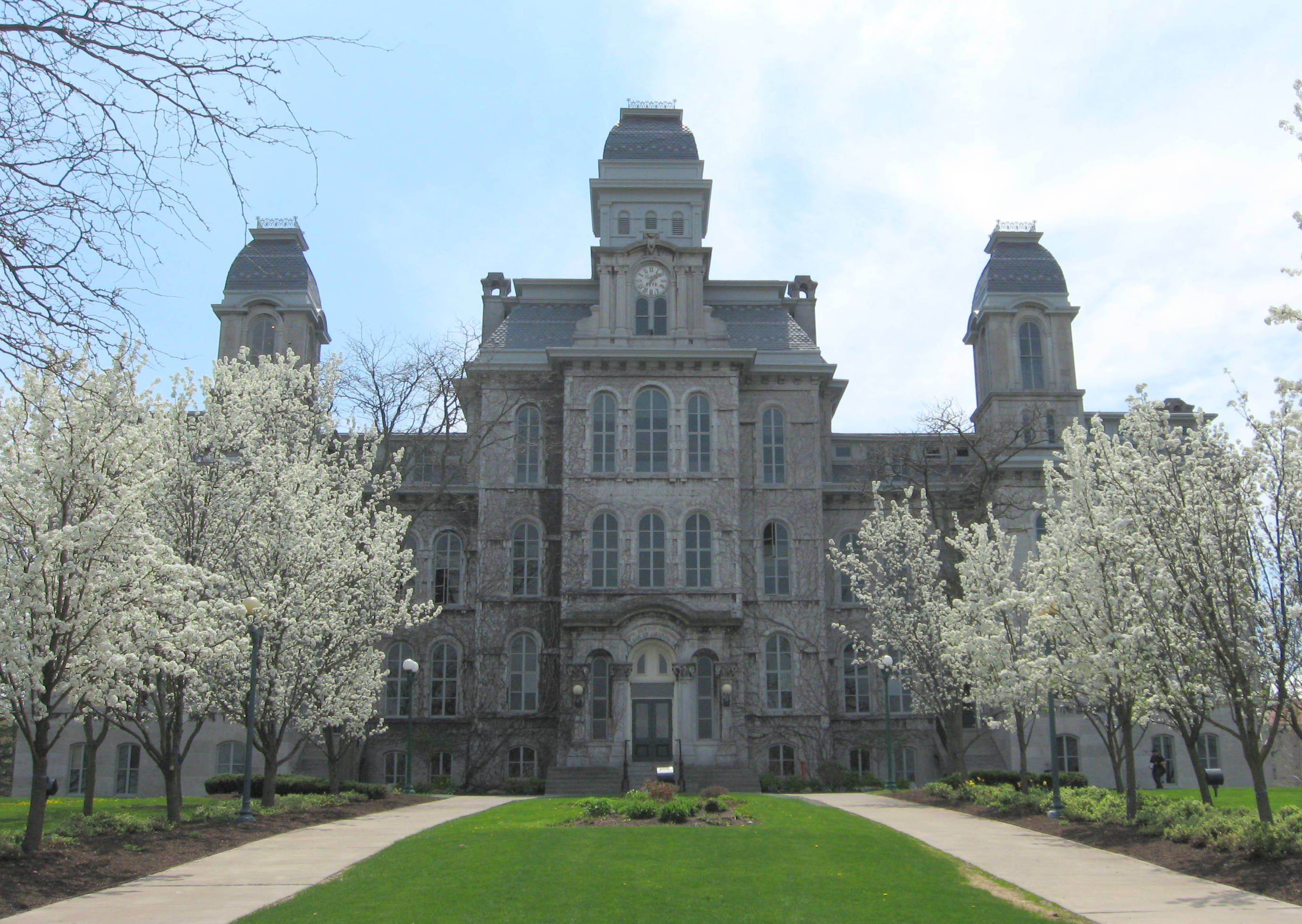
Syracuse University

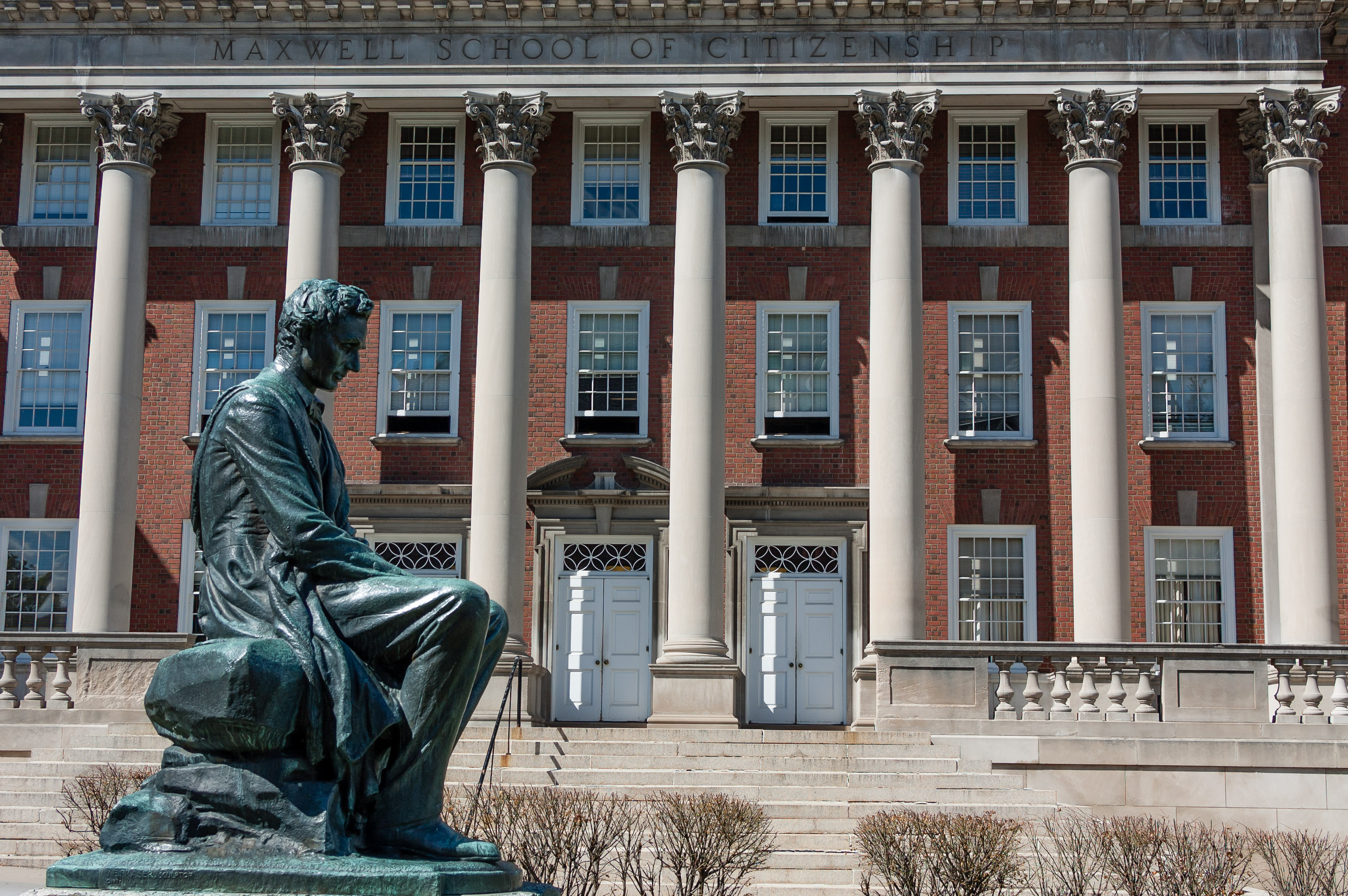
Maxwell School of Citizenship and Public Affairs

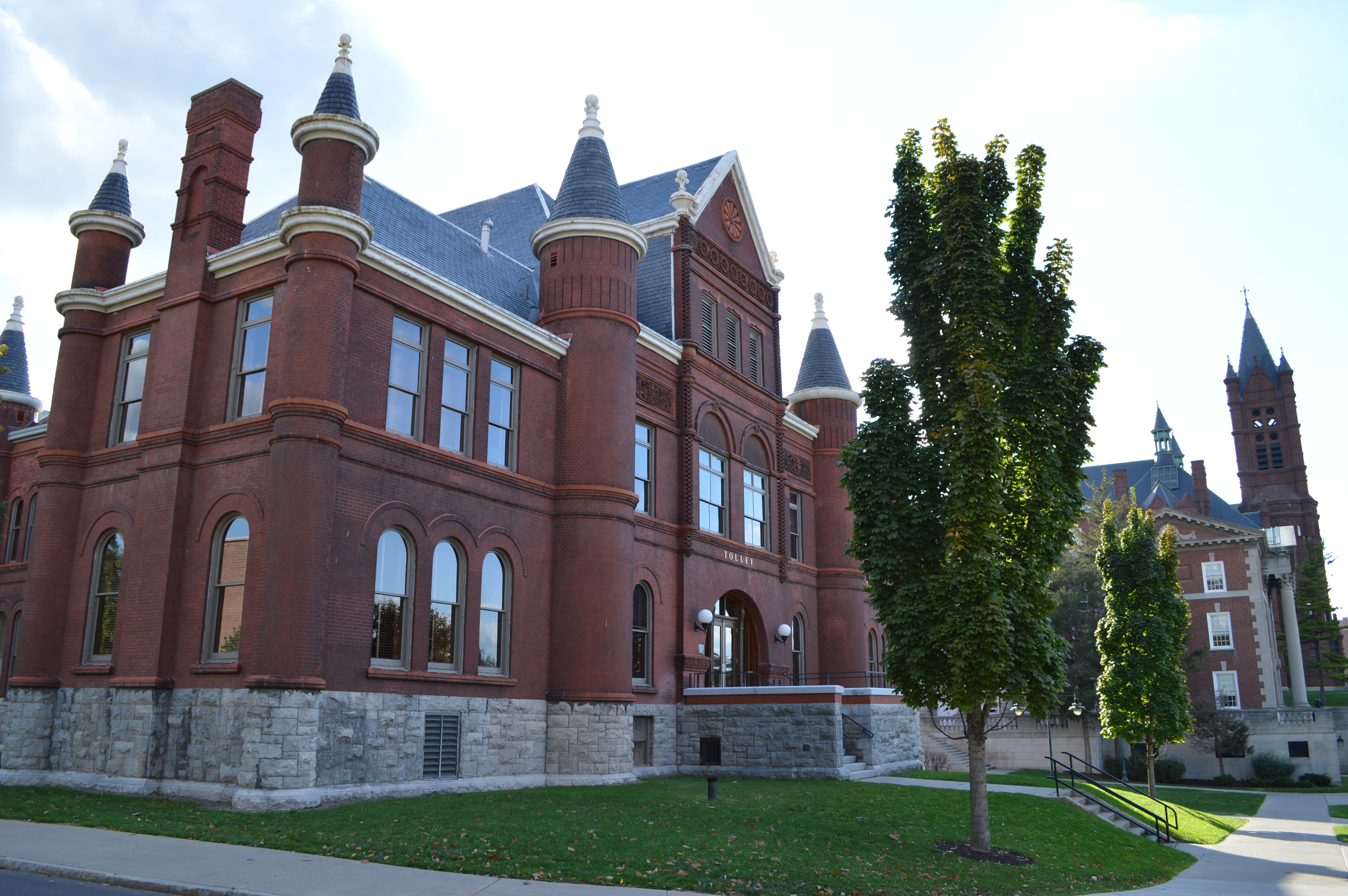
Syracuse University

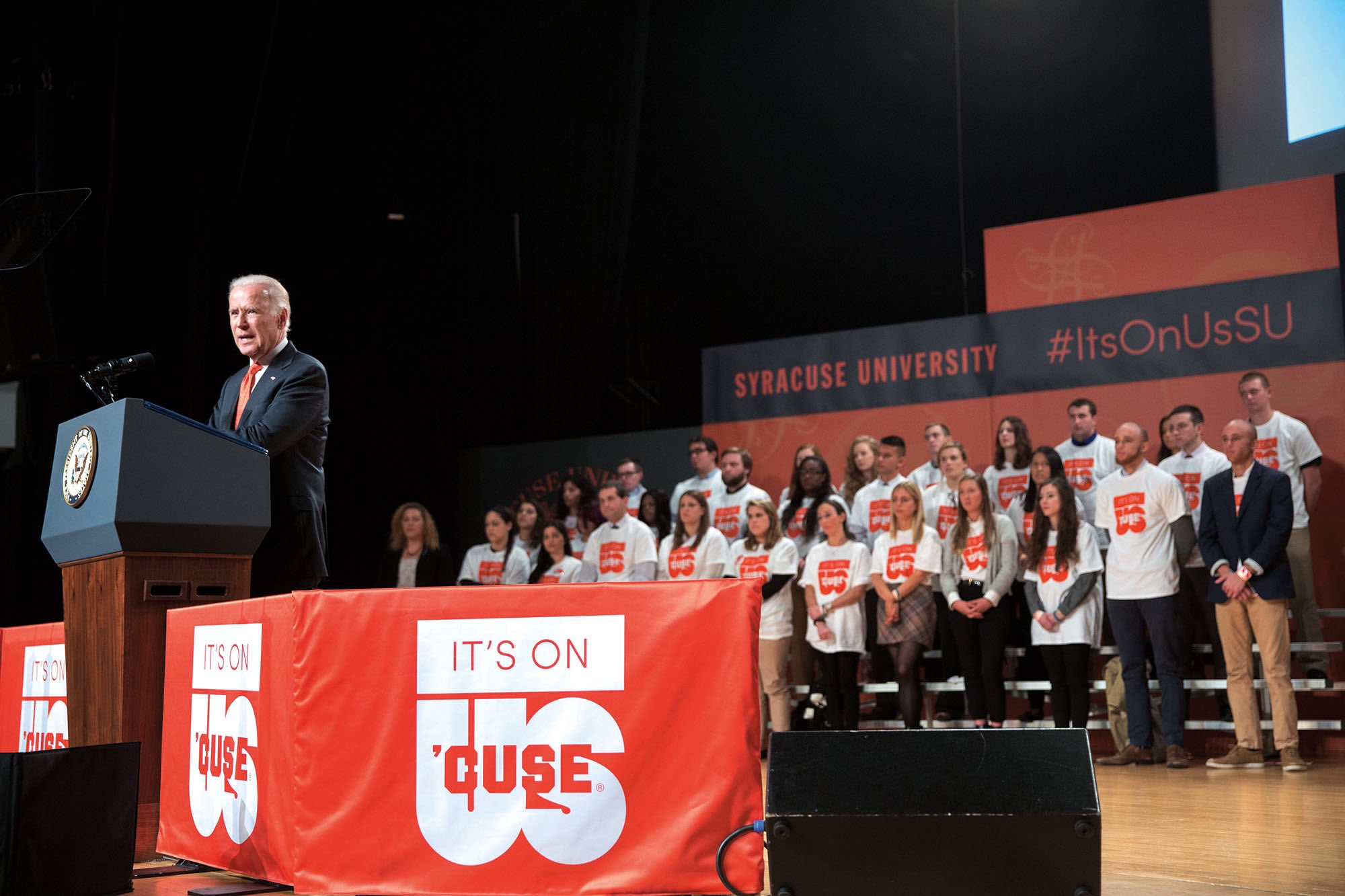
Joe Biden speaking at Syracuse University

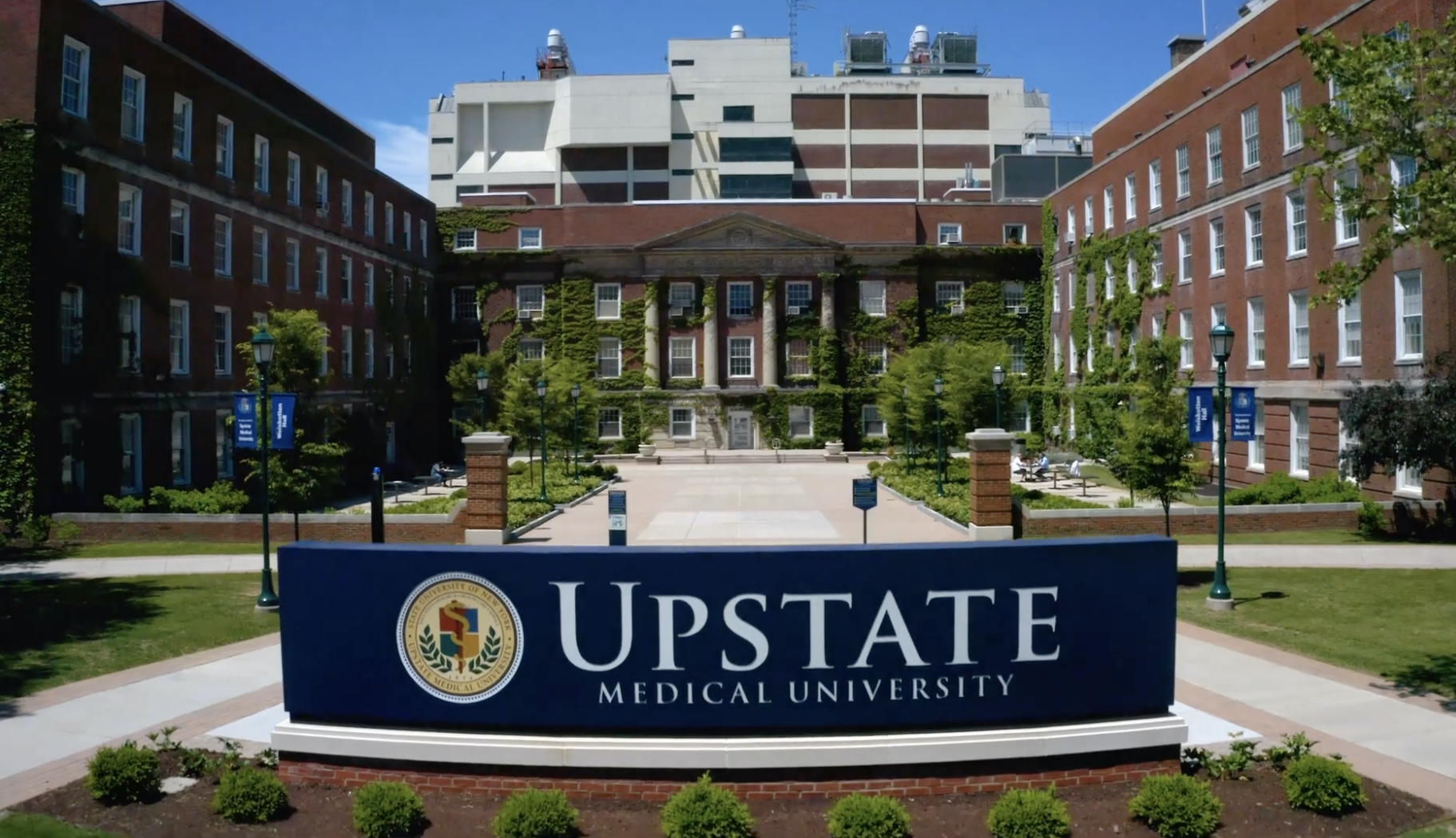
Upstate Medical University

== Education ==
=== Primary and secondary schools ===
The Syracuse City School District, which covers the entire city limits, consists of 34 schools and 4 alternative education programs. In the 2014–2015 school year, the K-12 enrollment was 20,084. 15% of students were classified as English Language Learners, 20% as students with disabilities, and 77% as economically disadvantaged. The drop-out rate was 6%. Syracuse City School District is collaborating with Say Yes to Education with the goal of every public school student graduating high school with the preparation and support to attain, afford, and complete a college or other postsecondary education. They are also one of the "Big 5", which consists of the five New York State School districts with populations over 125,000. "Big 5" school budgets are approved by annually by the Board of Education and city government as opposed to voters in an annual vote.

=== Colleges and universities ===
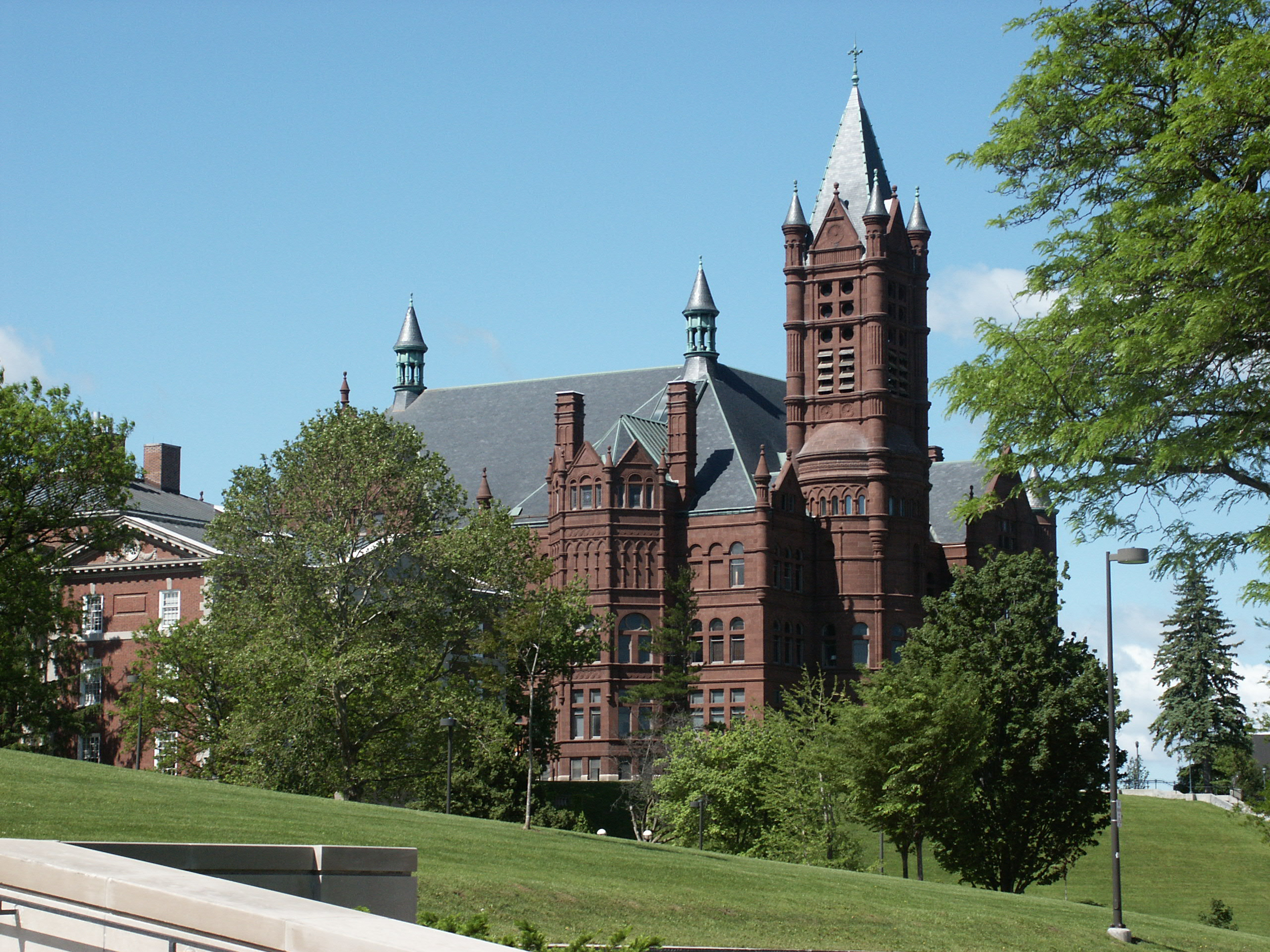
Syracuse University's Crouse College

One of Syracuse's major research universities is Syracuse University, located on University Hill. It had an enrollment of 22,484 for the 2017–2018 academic year. Immediately adjacent to Syracuse University are two doctoral-degree granting universities, the SUNY Upstate Medical University and SUNY College of Environmental Science and Forestry. Both institutions have long-standing ties to Syracuse University. Upstate Medical University is also one of Syracuse's major research universities and is one of only about 125 academic medical centers in the country. The medical university directly generates 10,959 jobs, making it Central New York's largest employer. In addition, the Norton College of Medicine at SUNY Upstate is the only medical school in the Central New York region providing education to over 700 students.

Also serving Syracuse are Le Moyne College on the city's eastern border, and Onondaga Community College, which has its main campus in the adjacent Town of Onondaga and has two smaller campuses, downtown and in Liverpool. A branch of SUNY's Empire State University is in downtown Syracuse, along with a campus of the nationwide Bryant & Stratton College. There are also the Pomeroy College of Nursing at Crouse Hospital and St. Joseph's College of Nursing.

Other colleges and universities in the area include Cornell University and Ithaca College in Ithaca, Hamilton College in Clinton, Oswego State College in Oswego, SUNY Cortland in Cortland, Morrisville State College in Morrisville, Colgate University in Hamilton, and both Utica College and SUNY Institute of Technology in Utica.

== Parks and recreation ==
The City of Syracuse maintains over 170 parks, fields, and recreation areas, totaling over 1,000 acres (4.0 km^{2}). Burnet Park includes the first public golf course in the United States (1901) and Rosamond Gifford Zoo. Other major parks include Thornden Park, Schiller Park, Sunnycrest Park, Onondaga Park and Kirk Park. There are 12 public pools, two public ice rinks (Sunnycrest and Meachem), and two public nine-hole golf courses (Burnet and Sunycrest Parks) in the city. Onondaga Park, located in the historic Strathmore neighborhood, features Hiawatha Lake, and a beautiful gazebo, often used for prom photos and wedding shoots.

Right outside the city proper, along the east side and north end of Onondaga Lake, is Onondaga Lake Park. The adjacent Onondaga Lake Parkway is closed to vehicular traffic several hours on Sundays during the summer months, so it can be used for walking, running, biking, and rollerblading. During the holiday season, the park hosts Lights on the Lake, a two-mile (3.2 km) drive-through light show.

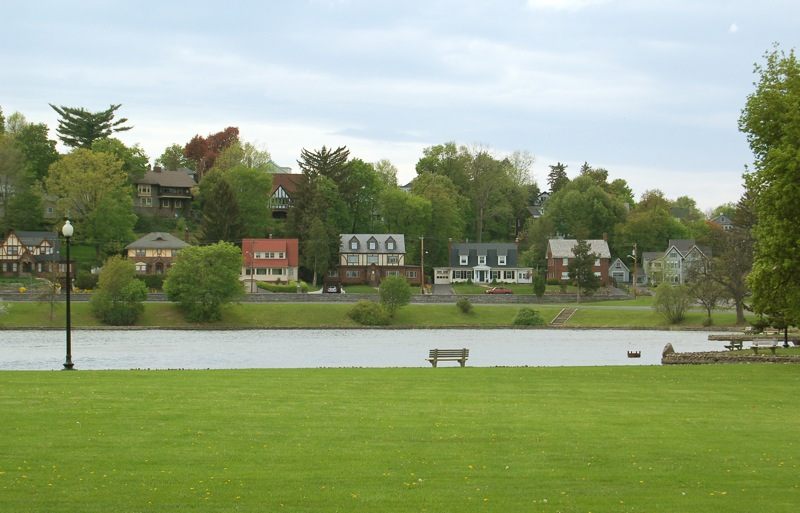
Upper Onondaga Park in Strathmore

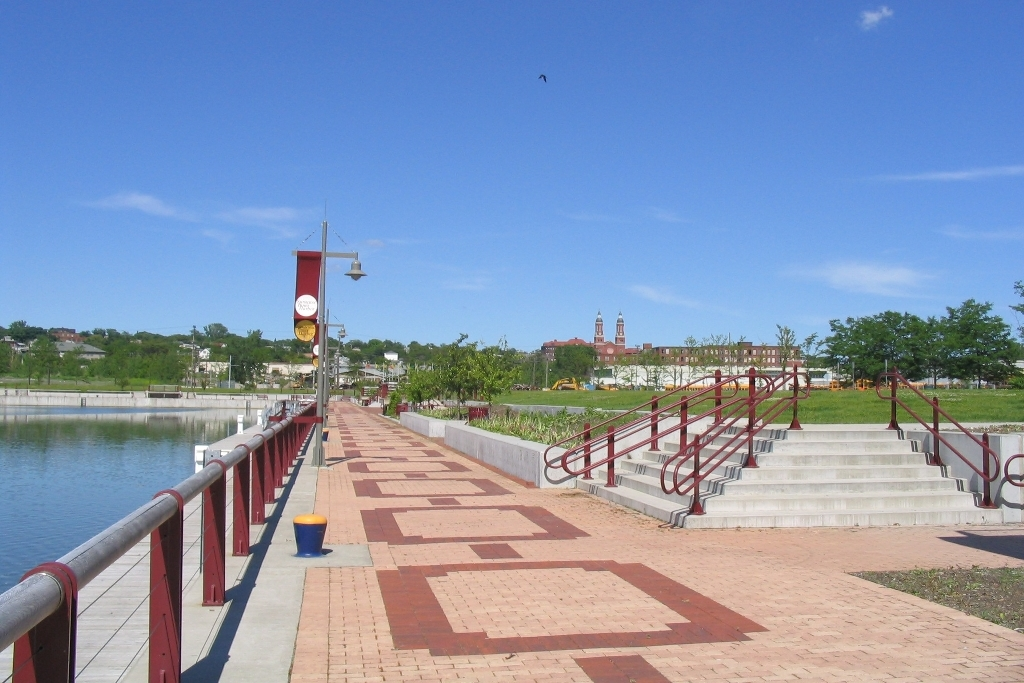
Inner harbor at Onondaga Lake

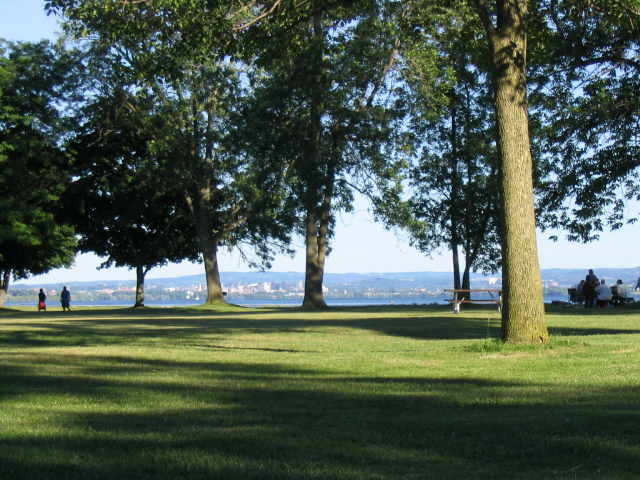
Onondaga Lake Park

== Sports ==
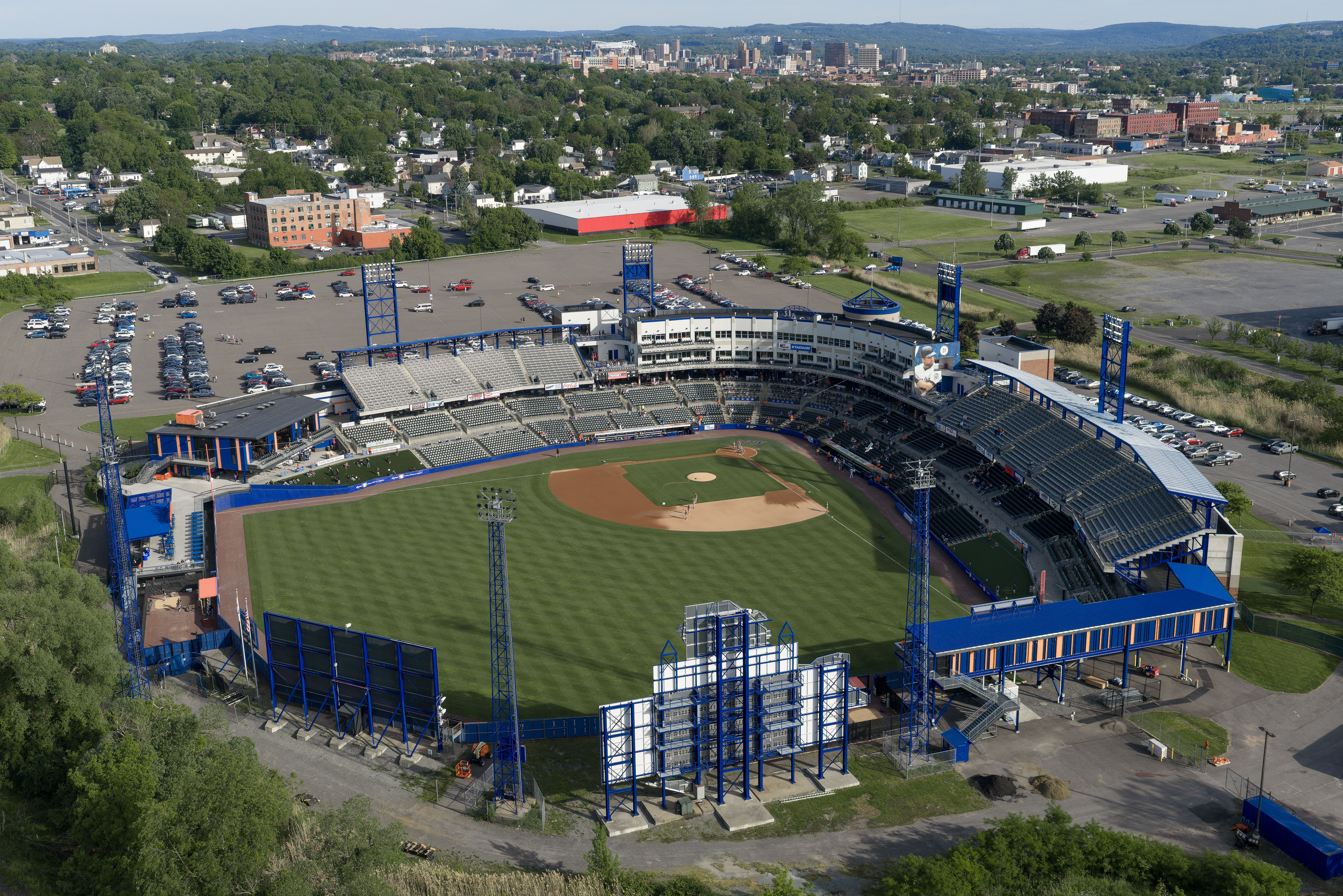
NBT Bank Stadium is home to the Syracuse Mets baseball team.

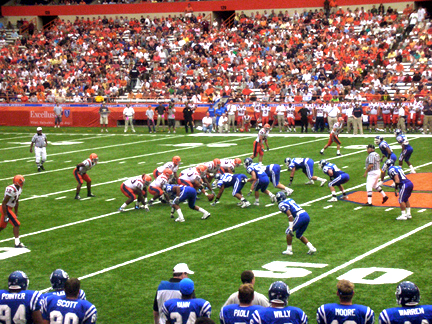
Syracuse University's football team plays its games in the JMA Dome.

=== Current teams ===
Club	Sport	League	Founded	Venue	League titles	Championship years
Syracuse Mets	Baseball	IL	1934	NBT Bank Stadium	8	1935, 1942, 1943, 1947, 1954, 1969, 1970, 1976
Syracuse Monarchs	Basketball	ABA	2023	Magnarelli Community Center	0	N/A
Syracuse Crunch	Ice hockey	AHL	1994	Upstate Medical University Arena	0	N/A
Syracuse FC	Soccer	NPSL	2017	Onondaga Community College	0	N/A

=== Collegiate teams ===
School	Nickname	Colors	Association	Conference
Syracuse University	Orange	Orange and blue	NCAA Division I-A	ACC
Le Moyne College	Dolphins	Green and gold	NCAA Division I	NEC
Onondaga Community College	Lazers	Carolina blue and white	NJCAA Division III	Mid-State Athletic Conference
SUNY Environmental Science and Forestry	Mighty Oaks	Green, white and gold	USCAA	HVIAC

Syracuse University sports are by far the most attended sporting events in the Syracuse area. Basketball games often draw over 30,000 fans, and football games over 40,000. The university has bred dozens of famous professional players since starting an athletics program in the late nineteenth century, including all-time greats Ernie Davis, Jim Brown, Larry Csonka and Dave Bing. Both teams play in the JMA Wireless Dome.

In addition to many former professional minor league teams, Syracuse was previously the home of several top-level pro teams, most notably the Syracuse Nationals who played a total of 17 seasons between the NBL and NBA, and won the 1955 NBA Finals before moving to Philadelphia and becoming the Philadelphia 76ers. Syracuse was also the home of two different Major League Baseball teams: the Syracuse Stars of the National League in 1879, which did not finish their first season; and the Syracuse Stars of the American Association in 1890.

== Government ==
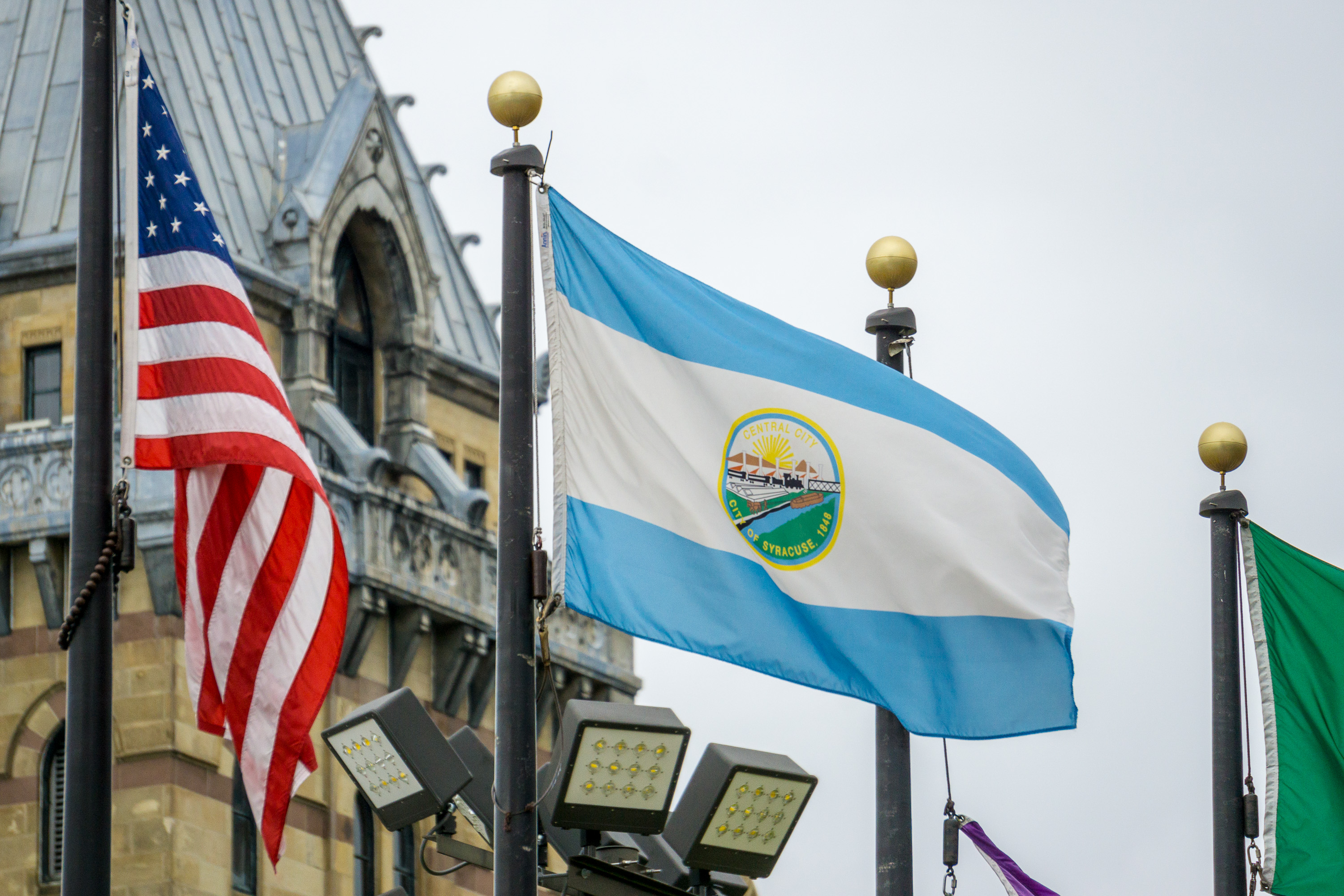
The former flag of Syracuse (1915–1974, 1994–2023) flies over Clinton Square

=== Executive ===
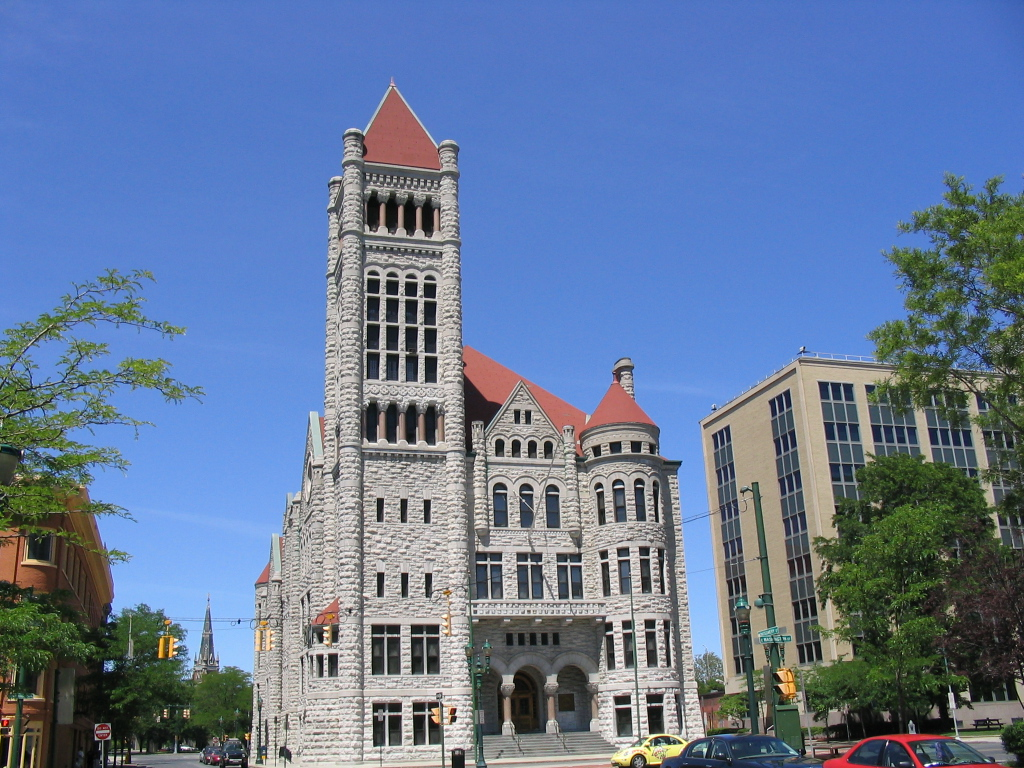
Syracuse City Hall

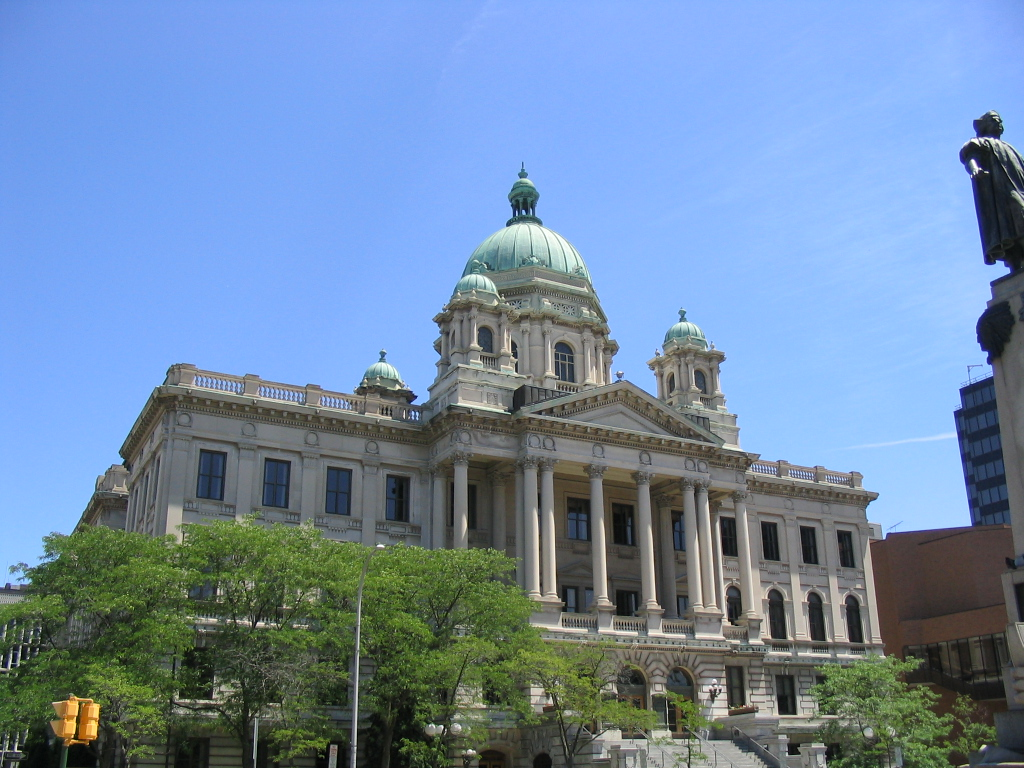
Onondaga County Courthouse at Columbus Circle

The city is headed by an elected mayor who is limited to two four-year terms. Syracuse has a Strong mayor-council form of government. On November 5, 2025 Sharon Owens was elected mayor. She took office in January 2026 and is the first black mayor and second woman to be mayor of Syracuse. The previous mayor was Ben Walsh, who was first elected November 7, 2017 and was the first independent mayor of Syracuse in over 100 years. The last independent mayor of Syracuse was Louis Will, who was elected in 1913. The mayor before Walsh was former Common Councilor at Large Stephanie Miner, who was elected on November 3, 2009; she was the first female mayor of Syracuse. Miner was preceded by former Syracuse Common Council President Matthew Driscoll, who first assumed the position in 2001 after the former mayor, Roy Bernardi, resigned upon his appointment by President George W. Bush to a position in the Department of Housing and Urban Development. After serving the remaining term, Driscoll was re-elected that year, and again in 2005.

=== Legislative ===
The legislative branch of Syracuse is the Syracuse Common Council. It consists of a president and nine members:

- Hon. Rita Paniagua (D) – President
- Hon. Dr. Chol Majok (D) – Councilor at Large
- Hon. Hanah Ehrenreich (D) – Councilor at Large
- Vacant – Councilor at Large
- Hon. Marty L. Nave (D) – 1st District
- Hon. Donna Moore (D) – 2nd District
- Hon. Corey Williams (D) – 3rd District
- Hon. Patrona Jones-Rowser (D) – 4th District
- Hon. Jimmy Monto (D) – 5th District

=== Judicial ===
The Onondaga County Supreme and County Court is the trial court of general jurisdiction for Syracuse. It is also the administrative court for the Fifth District of the New York State Unified Court System. Judges for these courts are elected at-large.

The U.S. District Court for the Northern District of New York also holds court in downtown Syracuse at the James Hanley Federal Building.

== Media ==
Syracuse.com is the most popular local media site in Central New York, according to ComScore, with an average of 3.98 Million unique users. Advance Media NY is the home of syracuse.com, which also produces the local newspaper, The Post-Standard. The two media units combined reach 422,000 in the Syracuse DMA, according to Nielsen, 2022. Advance Media NY is a digital media and marketing agency which helps businesses tell their stories in print, digital and visuals.

=== Radio ===
Syracuse is served by a number of AM and FM radio stations:

Frequency	Call sign	Format	Notes
AM 570	WSYR	News/Talk	Also heard on 106.9 WSYR-FM (Solvay)
AM 620	WHEN	Urban adult contemporary	Also heard on 101.7 W269DT in Syracuse
AM 1070	WZUN	Classic hits	Licensed to Sandy Creek-Pulaski, New York and heard on 106.1 W291BU in Fulton (See also: WZUN-FM)
AM 1200	WTLA	Sports	Also heard on 97.7 W249BC (Mattydale) and 1440 WSGO (Oswego)
AM 1260	WSKO	Sports	
AM 1300	WOSW	Sports	Licensed to Fulton and is heard on 98.5 W253BZ in Fulton
AM 1340	WMBO	Classic hits	Licensed to Auburn and is heard on 106.1 W291CV in Auburn. (See also: WSEN-FM Mexico)
AM 1390	WFBL	Classic hits	Also heard on 107.5 W298DC in Liverpool. (See slso: WSEN-FM)
AM 1440	WSGO	Sports	Licensed to Oswego and is heard on 100.1 W261AC in Oswego
AM 1490	WOLF	Sports	Also heard on 92.5 W223CP in Syracuse
AM 1540	WSIV	Christian radio	Licensed to East Syracuse and is heard on 106.3 W292EY in Syracuse
AM 1670	WERW	Free-form	Syracuse University
FM 87.7	WQSE-LD	Classic hits	Licensed to Westvale
FM 88.3	WAER	Jazz/News/Sports	
FM 88.7	WTMI	Religious (Catholic)	Licensed to Fleming
FM 88.9	WNYO	College radio	Licensed to Oswego
FM 89.1	WJPZ-FM	Rhythmic contemporary	
FM 89.9	WRVO	Public radio	Licensed to Oswego
FM 90.1	WRCU-FM	Free-form	Licensed to Fairport
FM 90.3	WRVD	Public radio	Satellite of WRVO, Oswego
FM 90.5	WBXL	Variety	Licensed to Baldwinsville
FM 90.5	WMVQ	Public radio	Licensed to Fenner
FM 91.3	WCNY-FM	Classical music	
FM 92.1	WOLF-FM	Country music	
FM 93.1	WNTQ	CHR/Top 40	
FM 94.5	WYYY	Adult contemporary	
FM 95.7	WAQX	Alternative rock	
FM 96.7	WCIO	Contemporary Christian	Licensed to Oswego (See: WCIS-FM)
FM 99.5	WTKW	Classic rock	
FM 100.3	WMVN	Rhythmic top 40	Licensed to Sylvan Beach. Also heard on 96.5 W243AB in Westvale
FM 100.9	WKRL	Active rock	
FM 101.7	WGKV	Contemporary Christian	Licensed to Pulaski (K-Love)
FM 102.1	WZUN-FM	Classic hits	Licensed to Phoenix
FM 102.9	WMHN	Christian radio	
FM 103.3	WSPJ-LP	Community radio/Variety	Also heard on 93.7 W229CU Syracuse
FM 103.9	WSEN-FM	Classic hits	Licensed to Mexico, NY
FM 104.7	WBBS	Country music	Licensed to Fulton
FM 105.1	WCIS-FM	Contemporary Christian	Licensed to DeRuyter
FM 105.5	WTKW	Classic rock	Licensed to Minetto
FM 105.9	WLKZ	Contemporary Christian	
FM 106.5	WKRH	Classic rock	Licensed to Fair Haven
FM 106.9	WSYR-FM	News/Talk	Licensed to Solvay
FM 107.9	WWHT	CHR/Top 40	

To see a complete list of radio stations in Syracuse including the surrounding area, please see: (Syracuse radio)

=== Television ===
According to Nielsen Media Research, Syracuse is the fifth largest television market in New York State and the 87th largest in the United States (as of the 2020–2021 TV season). Six major full-power stations serve the city: WSTM-TV 3 (NBC), WSYR-TV 9 (ABC), WKOF 15 (CBS), WCNY-TV 24/cable 11 (PBS), WSPX-TV 56/cable 4 (Ion), and WSYT 68/cable 8 (Fox). WSTM-TV also operates Roar affiliate WTVH 5, formerly the city's CBS affiliate, and the area's CW affiliate on its DT2 subchannel and cable channel 6. WSYT carries the MyNetworkTV affiliation on channel 43 and cable channel 7. Both WSTM-DT2 and WSYT-DT3 were previously separately-licensed stations before having their licenses returned to the FCC.

Additionally, networks such as Cornerstone Television channel 11 & 22, Univision, and MTV2 are broadcast by low-power television stations.

Syracuse University's student-run TV station is CitrusTV. CitrusTV programming is broadcast on the university campus on the Orange Television Network.

Syracuse's cable television provider is Charter Spectrum (Charter Communications acquired Time Warner Cable in 2016), which, as a part of its regular and digital offerings, provides a 24-hour local news channel (Spectrum News Central New York), public access channel, and an additional PBS channel. Several suburbs also have access to Verizon Fios for cable television. Dish Network and DirecTV also provide local satellite television subscribers with local broadcast stations.

=== Newspapers ===
Syracuse has one major daily morning newspaper, The Post-Standard. Until 2001, Syracuse also had an evening paper, The Herald-Journal. It focuses on local news throughout Central New York, and has a reporter in Washington, DC.

Before the merger with the evening paper, the Post-Standard was named among the "10 best newspapers in America with a circulation of under 100,000" by Al Neuharth of USA Today (run by a competing organization). Since the merger, circulation has increased to over 120,000. Even outside of its four-county delivery area, the paper is available in many convenience stores and supermarkets from the Canada–US border to the New York–Pennsylvania border. The newspaper partly caters to this audience as well, covering many stories from the Ithaca, Utica, and Watertown areas. Since opening a new printing press in 2002, the paper calls itself "America's Most Colorful Newspaper", as almost every page contains color.

The Daily Orange, the newspaper of Syracuse University and SUNY ESF students, is read by over 20,000 people daily, and is widely distributed in the University Hill neighborhood and Armory Square. The Dolphin, the weekly student newspaper of Le Moyne College is also available, read mainly by Le Moyne students.

There are other popular free newspapers, including Eagle Newspaper's downtown edition, the City Eagle, and Table Hopping, which focuses on the restaurant and entertainment scene. Additionally, a weekly newspaper, CNY Vision, publishes news and information focusing on Syracuse's African American community.

A Hispanic-based monthly publication, called the CNY Latino newspaper, is published in Syracuse by the CNY Latino Media Consortium in both paper and online formats, and covers an area from Rochester to Albany and Watertown to Binghamton.

A 1903 copy of The Daily Orange

=== Magazines ===
The Syracuse area is covered in a regional lifestyle publication called The Good Life, Central New York Magazine, mostly known as Central New York Magazine. The magazine is bi-monthly (six issues per year) and offers print + digital and digital only subscriptions; it covers the greater Syracuse and Central New York area.

Central New York Magazine premiered in May 2006 and tells "positive and uniquely CNY stories". Coverage areas include local shops and small businesses, regional travel destinations, food and drink, home décor, attractions and things to do, artisans, changemakers, and area trends.

== Infrastructure ==
=== Transportation ===
==== Public transit ====
Syracuse is served by the Central New York Regional Transportation Authority, or Centro. Centro operates bus service in Syracuse and its suburbs, as well as to outlying metropolitan area cities such as Auburn, Fulton, and Oswego.

Proposed public transit projects

In 2005, local millionaire Tom McDonald proposed an aerial tramway system, called Salt City Aerial Transit (S.C.A.T.), to link the university to the transportation center. The first segment from Syracuse University to downtown was estimated to cost $5 million, which McDonald planned to raise himself. Due to perceived low operating costs, the system was envisioned as running continuously.

==== Rail ====
Syracuse (station stop code SYR) is served by Amtrak's Empire Service, Lake Shore Limited, and Maple Leaf lines. Amtrak's station is part of the William F. Walsh Regional Transportation Center.

The Empire Service runs twice daily in each direction between Niagara Falls, NY and New York Penn Station, with major stops in Buffalo, Rochester, Syracuse, Utica, and Albany along the way. The Maple Leaf runs once daily in each direction, and follows the same route as the Empire Service, however instead of terminating in Niagara Falls, it continues on to Toronto.

Empire Service and Maple Leaf trains stop at the seasonal New York State Fair – NYF station during the New York State Fair's annual run each August. The NYF Station is located along the southern part of the fairgrounds, near the historic train car display of the Central New York Chapter, of the National Railway Historical Society.

The Lake Shore Limited runs once daily in each direction between Chicago and Boston or New York City (via two sections splitting Albany-Rensselaer). It follows the same route as the Empire Service and Maple Leaf between New York City and Buffalo-Depew, where it diverges and continues on through Cleveland and Toledo to Chicago.

A regional commuter rail service, OnTrack, was active from 1994 until it was discontinued in 2007 due to low ridership. Its sole route connected the Carousel Center to southern Syracuse, often extending to Jamesville in the summer.

==== Bus ====
Greyhound Lines, Megabus, OurBus, and Trailways provide long-distance bus service to destinations including New York City, Boston, Buffalo, Albany, and Toronto. Greyhound, Megabus, and Trailways use the William F. Walsh Regional Transportation Center in the northern area of the city, while OurBus stops near the campus of Syracuse University.

==== Air service ====
Syracuse is served by the Syracuse Hancock International Airport in nearby Salina, near Mattydale. The airport is named after Clarence E. Hancock, a former US Congressman representing Syracuse. The airport is served by 8 major airlines, which provide non-stop flights to important airline hubs and business centers such as Atlanta, Boston, Charlotte, Chicago, Detroit, Denver, Ft. Lauderdale, New York City, Orlando, Philadelphia, Tampa, Washington, DC, as well as connecting service to 147 foreign cities in 87 countries. Cargo carriers FedEx and UPS also serve the airport. New York City can be reached in under an hour flight. The City of Syracuse owns the airport and property, while a public for-benefit corporation runs the airport, the Syracuse Regional Airport Authority. The airport is protected by the 174th Attack Wing's Fire Department, and patrolled by Syracuse Airport Police Department Officers.

==== Major highways and roads ====
- I-81 runs north–south through Syracuse, and provides access to Canada, Pennsylvania and points south. Its downtown portion is extremely narrow, only consisting of four lanes and few onramps. The highway was known as the Penn-Can Expressway when first built, leading to the Penn-Can Mall and other similarly named developments. It will soon be rerouted to follow I-481's route around the city instead of going through downtown. The current route will be designated as Business I-81.
- I-90, signed as the New York State Thruway within New York State, runs east–west, just north of the city. It is a toll highway that provides access to Rochester, Buffalo, Albany, and the north–south (I-87) part of the Thruway leads to New York City.
- I-690 runs east–west through the city, and provides access to I-90, as well as to Syracuse's northwestern and eastern suburbs. A spur off I-690 directly west of the city, NY 695, provides freeway access to the southwestern suburbs. It meets I-81 in downtown Syracuse in a highly complex and incomplete intersection. Most of its routing through the city directly replaced the former elevated rail lines of the New York Central four-track mainline, a fact quite notable by the city's former main rail terminal, where the freeway spans the width between the terminal and its outermost platform. In 1981, artist Duke Epolito erected sculptures of "passengers" on the single remaining passenger platform. The piece is entitled "Waiting for the Night Train".
- I-481 forms an eastern loop around the city and continues to the northwest as NY 481 to Fulton and Oswego, on the shore of Lake Ontario. The highway was built to provide rapid access to eastern suburbs after the affluent community members in Manlius and Fayetteville squashed the original design to extend I-690 to serve the eastern suburbs. The highway is soon to be replaced in designation by I-81.

Community Grid

In late May, 2023, The Community Grid project was officially approved for construction in the Syracuse. The highly controversial plan consists of removing the I-81 viaduct that runs through the downtown of the city, and replacing it with the Boulevard style Business Loop-81. The heavily congested I-81 will be re-routed around the city onto the already existing I-481. This project is estimated to cost around 2.25 billion dollars, and will be completed over a multi-year process. Construction has already begun in portions of North Syracuse at the interchange of I-81 and I-481.

Two US Highways run through the Syracuse area:

- US 11 (Route 223 in Québec to New Orleans) runs north–south through Syracuse, including downtown, and it follows Salina, State, and Wolf streets.
- US 20 (Boston to Newport, Oregon) passes south of Syracuse.

New York State Route Expressways:

- NY 481 travels from NY 104 in Oswego to the northern terminus of I-481 north of Syracuse.
- NY 690 was built as an extension of Interstate 690 to serve the northwest suburbs of Syracuse. The route is a four-lane divided highway from its southern end at the interchange of I-690, where it meets the New York State Thruway (I-90), to its end northwest of Baldwinsville in Lysander at the intersection of NY 48 and NY 631.
- NY 695 is a short state highway west of Syracuse in the village of Solvay in Onondaga County. The number of the highway was derived from the two highways that NY 695 links, I-690 and NY 5.

New York State Routes

- NY 5 runs east–west through Syracuse, including downtown, and follows Erie Boulevard and West Genesee Street.
- NY 80's western terminus is at NY 175 on the south side. The route follows Valley Drive.
- NY 92's western terminus is in downtown Syracuse at US 11. The route follows East Genesee Street.
- NY 173 runs east–west through Syracuse and follows the Seneca Turnpike through the South Valley neighborhood.
- NY 175 follows South Avenue and West Kennedy Street to its eastern terminus at US 11.
- NY 290's western terminus is at US 11 just north of I-81. The route follows James Street.
- NY 298's western terminus is at exit 9 on I-690. The route follows Bear and Court Streets, Genant Drive and Sunset Avenue.
- NY 370's eastern terminus is at US 11 in the Lakefront neighborhood. The route follows Park Street.
- NY 598 is a short north–south highway following Midler Avenue to its southern terminus at NY 5.

=== Public works ===
Public services such as garbage pickup, street plowing, sewage, and street and traffic maintenance are provided by the Department of Public Works.

=== Utilities ===
The Syracuse water system was one of the few water systems built and operated before federal funding. The water system was constructed mainly to support the industries around Syracuse, New York. Construction of Syracuse's water system began in 1868. The water is brought in on a gravity fed system from Skaneateles Lake, through an unfiltered system, and carried into the city. It is noted for having some of the best drinking water in the nation, due to the quality of the lake.

In 2015, the city experienced an average of at least one water main break per day. Between 2005 and 2015, the city suffered 2,000 water main breaks. Mayor Stephanie Miner estimated of the cost to fix the city's water infrastructure at $1 billion over a 10–15-year period. On February 25, 2015, Miner testified before a joint hearing of the state Assembly Ways and Means Committee and state Senate Finance Committee. Miner testified that the 2014 polar vortex contributed to the increase in Syracuse's water main break.

On March 3, the 100th water main break in Syracuse in 2015 occurred on James Street. Early in 2015, Miner lobbied the state for funding to fix the city's aging water system. New York Governor Andrew Cuomo declined to help, stating that the city should improve its economy and increase tax revenues, which would enable the city to fund their own water pipe repairs.

=== Police department ===
The Syracuse Police Department (SPD) is the principal law enforcement agency of the city of Syracuse, New York. For 2017–18, the police department budget was $48.5 million (equivalent to $60.9 million in 2024). Effective April 22, 2022, longtime Deputy Chief Joe Cecile is Chief of the SPD, following his predecessor Kenton Buckner's retirement. Police headquarters is in the John C. Dillon Public Safety Building at 511 South State Street. The SPD is divided into three patrol zones North (Lakefront, Northside, Eastwood, Tip Hill), South West (Strathmore, Valley, Southside, Near-Westside), and Southeast (University Area, Downtown, Meadowbrook, Eastside).

In 2019, a jury awarded Elijah Johnson $35,000 (equivalent to $44,074.58 in 2025) after he was beaten with unreasonable force by three police officers while being arrested. In addition, the city was forced to pay attorneys fees, at a total cost to taxpayers of $213,000.

In 2024, Officer John Tassini was Syracuse's top paid employee earning a total of $282,000.

==== Surveillance ====
Established in 2011, SPD operates a network of 521 surveillance cameras called the Criminal Observation and Protection System (COPS). Between 2011 and 2014 more than 40 utility pole mounted cameras were installed, mainly in the Southwest and Northeast neighborhoods. The cameras were funded by federal, state, and private grants. In Summer 2014, 10 cameras were approved for installation in Downtown Syracuse, the first area not targeted because of high levels of violent crime. Live monitoring of Clinton Square for suspicious people during events and festivals was planned, although police agreed to a prohibition on the use of cameras to monitor protests. Twenty-five additional cameras were planned to be installed in 2016.

In spring 2017, the surveillance system was augmented with the installation of ShotSpotter gunshot detection sensors. Syracuse Mayor Stephanie Miner cited increasing public acceptance of police cameras and lower technology costs as factors in the decision.

=== Fire department ===
The Syracuse Fire Department (SFD) has the responsibility of protecting the City of Syracuse from fires and other dangers. The department provides multiple services in addition to fire related calls: multi-county regional HAZ-MAT response, first response to medical and trauma calls, unmanned aerial vehicle (drone) capabilities, and teams experienced in high-angle rope, swift water, and confined space rescue operations. The Chief of Fire is Michael J. Monds. SFD headquarters is in the John C. Dillon Public Safety Building at 511 South State Street. The department has a Class 1 rating from the Insurance Services Office, which is the best rating obtainable. This rating has a direct effect on the fire insurance of properties within the city. The SFD operates out of 11 fire stations, organized into three districts (akin to battalions), located throughout the city. The SFD currently maintains nine engine companies (operating with nine corresponding "mini" units), five truck companies, one heavy rescue company, a manpower-squad company, and several special and support units. The department also provides Aircraft Rescue and Firefighting ARFF coverage and specialized fire, rescue, medical, and hazardous materials coverage to the Syracuse Hancock International Airport (station 4).

== Sister cities ==
Syracuse's sister cities are:

- (United States) Boise, Idaho
- Chiayi City, Taiwan
- Fuzhou, Fujian, China
- Huế, Vietnam
- Irpin, Ukraine
- Syracuse, Italy
- Taiz, Yemen
- Tampere, Finland

== See also ==
- Interfaith Works (Syracuse)
- List of Syracuse University people
- Rescue Mission Syracuse
