= Onondaga Creekwalk =

Trail in New York

Coordinates: 43°02′49.4″N 76°09′22.9″W

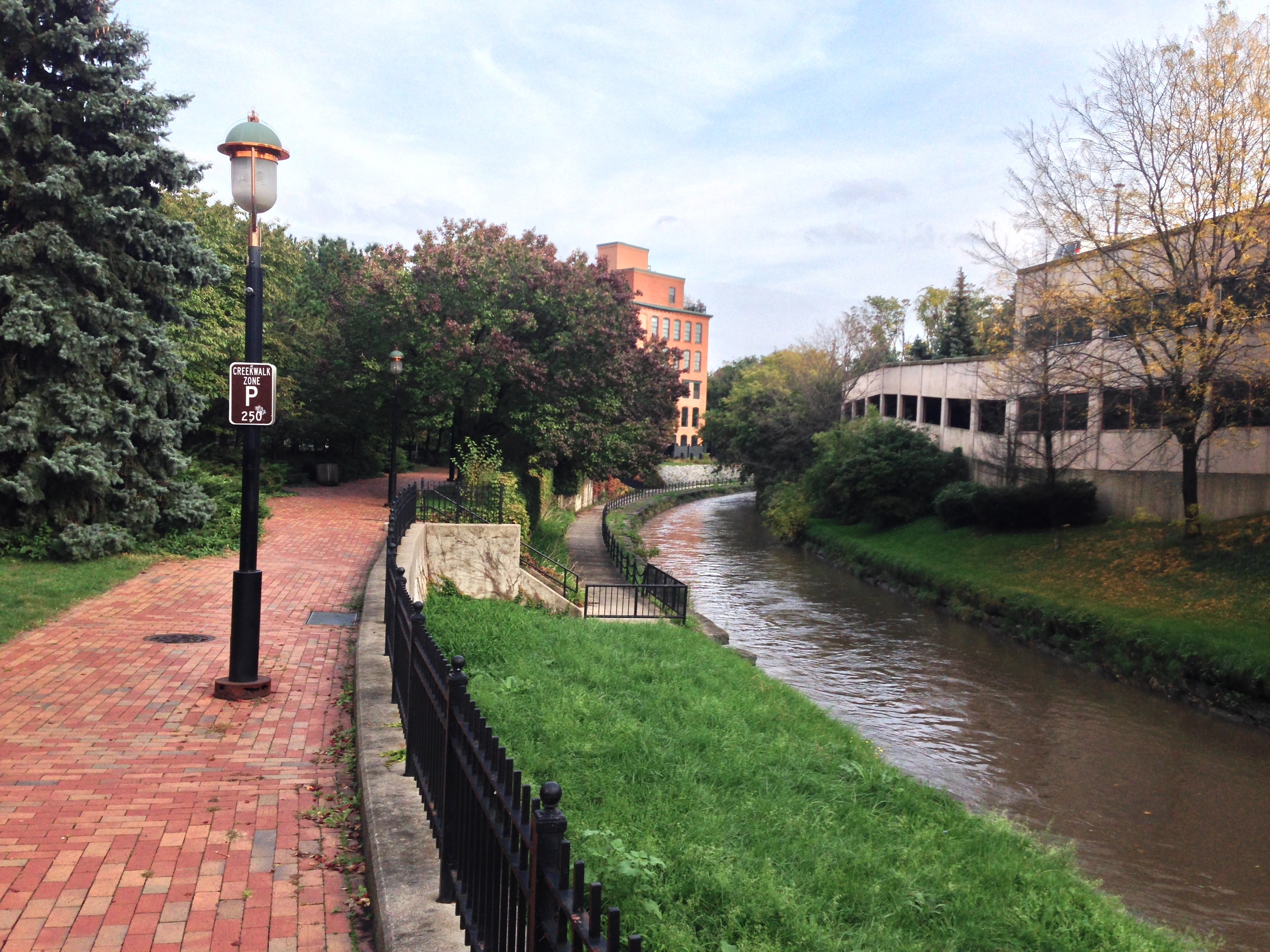
A section of the Creekwalk through Franklin Square

The Onondaga Creekwalk is a mostly paved, partly bricked, multi-use trail running 4.8 miles (7.7 km) in Syracuse, New York, which has so far seen more than three decades of planning, construction, and delays, starting in 1988. The trail is designed for bicyclists, skaters, and pedestrians to approximately parallel any desired portion of Onondaga Creek's run connecting Kirk Park on Syracuse's South Side, downstream through downtown at Armory Square, and then on to Onondaga Lake at the creek's ultimate mouth.

During both of the two overall phases completed so far, designers were able to route the trail partly as a brand new, dedicated path that stayed within view of Onondaga Creek. Other parts were built as compromises in the face of creekside obstacles, generally co-locating the trail with pre-existing street and sidewalk pavement, usually at a significant distance from the water.

When added to pre-existing parkways and city streets paralleling Onondaga Creek between West Colvin Street at Kirk Park, upstream to Ballantyne Road in The Valley neighborhood, the total available creekway distance can be interpreted as a paved run of 6.1 miles (9.8 km).

== Phase 1 Walking Tour Notes ==
In April 2015, the Onondaga Creekwalk Phase 1 experience was enhanced by the addition of a series of 12 all-weather interpretive signage kiosks, along with an associated series of short local history videos, linked by a smartphone-readable code. This was during the then-mayoral administration of Stephanie Miner, working with the Onondaga Historical Association (OHA), and a design class at Syracuse University's College of Visual and Performing Arts (VPA).

For Phase 1, there are two single-page PDFs that map and describe the route. The first is "Tour Syracuse's History..." which covers the series of kiosks and videos. The second is the "Onondaga Creekwalk" brochure, which serves as a more traditional trail map.

Starting from Armory Square headed northerly, or downstream, here is an ordered summary of these signage and linked video locations, together with several other locations of note.

• Trailhead on West Jefferson Street, west side of The MoST in Armory Square. Kiosk 1) The Armory and the associated video tie into the former New York National Guard building, and the history of the guard's Troop D Cavalry unit, based in Syracuse.

• Between West Jefferson and Walton. Here, Onondaga County's "Save the Rain" project installed a showcase of four green infrastructure technologies.

• Walton Street intersection, south side. At this point, Phase 2 of the Onondaga Creekwalk connects, headed briefly west and then south.

• West Fayette Street intersection, south side. The sculpture by Brendan Rose and students, "Walt, the Loch West Monster", was installed November 2011.

• West Fayette Street intersection, south side. Kiosk 2) The Warehouse covers Syracuse University's so-named building nearby, and links to a video bio of Syracuse pioneer John Wilkinson.

• Between West Fayette and West Washington. Kiosk 3) Rumble of Trains explains the massive, surviving limestone wall and twin-arched creek bridge nearby, linking to a video showing how this formerly supported an eight-platform train shed attached to the New York Central's third downtown station.

• West Washington Street, north side. Kiosk 4) The Original Washington Station and the related video talk about Syracuse's brief, personal interaction with New York Central railroad tycoon Cornelius Vanderbilt.

• West Washington Street, north side. This represents the starting point for the first of two stretches where Phase 1 planners made routing compromises due to creekside obstacles. There are structures in this area built to straddle the creek: 1) The city-owned Washington Street Parking Garage; and 2) The Syracuse Office Environments building, as conjoined with Creekwalk Commons. Beyond Erie Boulevard West, National Grid's headquarters campus is apparently so tight to the creek (with the West Street Arterial hemming in things from the other side) that planners couldn't find a way to put the trail through here, even though the City of Syracuse is actually the titled owner of the creekbed in this area.

• Compass Rose Park between Water and Erie at Franklin. Kiosk 5) The Niagara Mohawk Buildling links to a topically matching video.

• West Genesee Street at Wallace, near old Fire Station No. 12. Kiosk 6) The Old Red Mill links to a video detailing Frederick Horner's once-nearby saw mill.

• Beneath Route 690 and associated overpasses. The "creek right" walkway is briefly carried above the splash zone for two large outflow pipes, which are county-owned outfall locations for the Combined Sewer Overflows (CSOs) problem suffered in Syracuse and many other cities. Direct discharge of untreated sanitary sewer, mixed with an overwhelming amount of storm water, is inevitable during high water times, so long as any significant part of the upstream infrastructure remains combined.

• Beneath Evans Street bridge. Here there is a connecting trail between the creekwalk proper and North Franklin Street, opening up options to travel in a loop in the Franklin Square district.

• Between Evans and Plum. This is the most likely zone for the creekwalk to be occasionally closed due to flooding, especially in spring.

• Old Plum Street Bridge. Kiosk 7) Coal Dust and Smokestacks links to a video covering the surviving and historically registered O.M. Edwards building nearby. Little known bonus fact: Plum Street formerly traversed in a dogleg, from the west side near the Erie Canal (today, Erie Boulevard West), under the elevated railroad, turning easterly toward North Franklin. The installation of Route 690 atop the rail corridor cut the street in two, but both disconnected portions today still retain the "Plum Street" designation.

• Old railroad bridge near Maltbie Street. Kiosk 8) Remnants of Railroads and the video tie the rail spur formerly carried by this bridge with old manufacturers in the district, including the maker of the Bradley Forging Hammer. Little known bonus fact: This railroad bridge and a second nearby both carried sidings which split off of the Delaware, Lackawanna and Western Railroad — back-tracking nearly all the way from State Fairgrounds, more than two miles away as the crow flies. This Herculean effort was required, despite the circumstance that the DL&W's main line already passed right through Syracuse's near west side, just seven or so city blocks to the south, sandwiched between what is today Erie Boulevard West and West Fayette Street. It was not so simple to route a siding north, however, as the city had gotten congested, and the competing New York Central already monopolized two intervening spaces, the first in the same near west side yard, and the second running parallel along what is today the corridor for Route 690.

• Second old railroad bridge near Maltbie Street. Supports the U.S. Geological Survey's outhouse-sized stream gauging station Onondaga Creek at Spencer Street.

• 150 feet upstream from Spencer Street bridge. There is a concrete structure often visible in the creek bed, which triggers a sharp dropoff and a small standing wave in times of strong current. This is a county-owned box-shaped pipe for sewer to flow, by the pressure of gravity, under the creek to the other side, en route to the Metropolitan Sewer Plant, fronting on Hiawatha Boulevard West.

• Between Spencer and West Kirkpatrick. Just east of the trail as built in this area, the creekwalk was restrained from being routed directly along the well-treed, government-owned corridor to either side of Onondaga Creek, because adjoining privately held acreage ranked as the American Bag and Metal Company's listed Superfund site. The land has since been remediated under the government's brownfields incentives program.

• Syracuse Parks Department's Headquarters Area, north of Spencer Street. Kiosk 9) Mineral Springs and Baths and the associated video cover a time period when several nearby resorts offered heated or cool baths in salty groundwater, which included natural chlorine and sulphur.

• Inner Harbor, north of West Kirkpatrick Street. Kiosk 10) A Harbor for Syracuse and the video cover a tradition of boatbuilding in this area of Syracuse, including by New York's canal maintenance department, which once manufactured its own work boats nearby.

• Inner Harbor, north of West Kirkpatrick Street. There are free, un-timed parking lots here for the waterfront park, which also serve as de facto trailhead parking.

• West Bear Street. More free trailhead parking, and the junction between the Onondaga Creekwalk and the combined stretch of Loop the Lake and Empire State trails, heading northwesterly at first alongside city streets.

• The Baby Maddox Lawrence plaque and bench. This memorial references a February 2016 murder committed by the father of the 21-month-old victim, whose body was recovered nearby from Onondaga Creek.

• Van Rensselaer at Hiawatha Boulevard. The vacant land alongside the water in this area will probably always remain vacant. This was the spot into which the "spoils" were pumped, within a temporary system of dikes, allowing silt to slowly settle from the water, during two prior rounds of dredging the waterway for navigation, 1998-1999 and 2018–2019.

• Ramp approaching Hiawatha Boulevard West. Kiosk 11) A Sea of 'Solar Salt' Sheds and the associated video talk about the large amount of nearby acreage that was once devoted to extracting salt from brine by evaporation. Plus a recently rediscovered tie-in to a silent black and white melodrama filmed in Syracuse.

• Beneath the bridge at Hiawatha Boulevard West. There is de facto trailhead parking here at the corner of Destiny's overflow parking lots closest to the creek/Inner Harbor water — accessible from either Solar Street, or through the underpass from the mall's main lots. This is about as close as one can legitimately park in order to access the lake view, when it's open, which is about 0.4 miles away. Unaccountably, trail designers made no provision for simply allowing visitors to park in the similarly situated corner of Destiny's main lots, then to cut across the mall's Harborside Drive ring road, and then through the trees to see the lake, or to get started on the trail from this end.

• Lake overlook. Kiosk 12) A Sacred Lake and the matching video cover Onondaga Lake's significance in the pre-contact formation of the Iroquois Confederacy.

== Chronology of development ==
Though long wished for by many citizens, Syracuse landscape architect Steve Buechner traces the origins of the Onondaga Creekwalk concept to 1965, when incoming Syracuse Parks Commissioner Jim Heath asked him, as a young staffer, to draft out several greenways, one of which wound up focusing on the creek. The idea didn't go anywhere for more than 20 years until Buechner, then in the private sector, mentioned it to Robert Congel of The Pyramid Companies, at a time when Congel and others were paying a burst of redevelopment attention to several old factory buildings in what is now known as the Franklin Square area.

Using computer technology against the newspaper archive, June 24, 1988, can be established as the first time the ultimately built version of the creekwalk was publicly mentioned. At that time, Pyramid described a plan to get a longer trail started by building just that stretch running through Franklin Square from near Route 690's overpasses, downstream as far as Spencer Street. That news was reported within the context of a large number of revelations from Pyramid and Syracuse's then mayoral administration of Thomas G. Young—regarding development plans for the shopping mall project which became Destiny USA, and for the larger industrial district formerly known as Oil City and now dubbed Lakefront, including Franklin Square.

=== First Part of Phase 1 ===
In September 1990, this first part of the walkway—3/8ths of one mile—formally opened. Pyramid fronted the money and supervised the work, which cost $1.68 million, and was ultimately to be paid for from payments in lieu of taxes (PILOT agreements) which the neighborhood's several various redevelopments were expected to make.

At the time of the trail's initial opening, plans were forecast for the rest of the project. Extending the trail upstream as far as Armory Square was expected to be done by 1991 and 1992, and then finishing all the necessary parts downstream as far as Onondaga Lake was expected a few years later. In fact, the rest of Phase 1 wouldn't be done for more than two decades.

=== Second Part of Phase 1 ===
In July 1993, ground was ceremoniously broken for a (for-the-time-being disconnected) stretch of 1,600 feet of creekwalk as part of development of park-style amenities at the then newly renamed Inner Harbor, a formerly unkempt area historically known as the Barge Canal Terminal. Expected completion for the first phase was October 1993. The early work was reported to cost $500,000 and to have been paid for out of settlement monies from the Niagara Mohawk Power Corp. over a state environmental pollution case involving Onondaga Lake.

=== Remainder of Phase 1 ===
In October 2011, what is now summed up by officials as the creekwalk's Phase 1 was finally completed. The cost figures given at the time were $10.1 million, though it's unclear whether that included or excluded the prior work. The total length to that point was 2.6 miles (4.2 km) mostly paralleling Onondaga Creek and the Inner Harbor, connecting the Milton J. Rubenstein Museum of Science and Technology (The MoST) in Armory Square northerly to Onondaga Lake near the shopping mall Destiny USA. Creekside obstacles forced compromises in the trail routing in two places: 1) Between West Washington and West Genesee streets downtown; and 2) A shorter stretch between Spencer and West Kirkpatrick in Oil City.

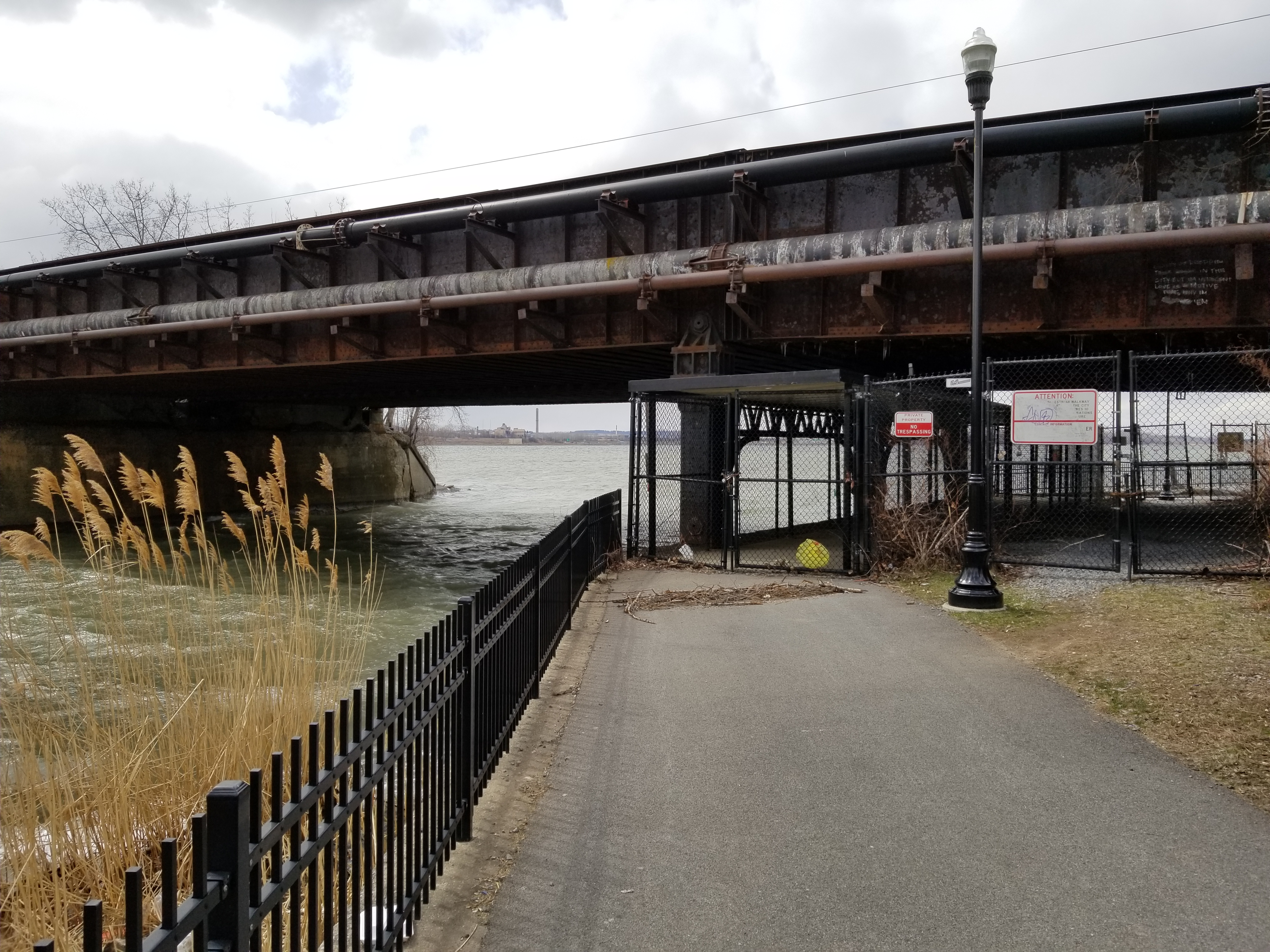
Onondaga Creekwalk near Onondaga Lake viewing area in 2018, when access through the fenced underpass beneath the CSX double-tracked main line was locked due to pavement erosion issues by the lake.

In Fall 2018, the northernmost end of the trail—being that portion running under the double-tracked CSX mainline and terminating at a viewing area for Onondaga Lake—was announced as closed indefinitely due to ice and waves having eroded the pavement. At the time, repairs were said to be awaiting construction of the Onondaga Lake Lounge, which was planned as a larger and more formal viewing area along the lake. However, since that time, the lakeview terminus has had its gates open more often than not, even during the heart of winter, when Onondaga Lake's visiting population of Bald Eagles peaks.

=== Phase 2 ===
In July 2020, the creekwalk's Phase 2 was formally declared complete. The planning process for this portion began with public meetings in 2014, then construction started in February 2019. The final cost for this stretch was $11.4 million.

Phase 2 technically starts in Armory Square at Phase 1's Walton Street intersection, not at Phase 1's southernmost end point one block away at The MoST on West Jefferson Street.

Phase 2 is a 2.2-mile (3.5 km) extension which stays close to Onondaga Creek for 80 percent of its run, according to project planners. But, significantly, that's not the case in the immediate downtown area. Due to lack of space, flooding issues, environmental impacts, security concerns, and construction costs, planners decided against staying close to the creek through three challenging zones close to downtown: 1) The Trolley Lot area; 2) Several bridges in close succession (Dickerson Street, Gifford Street, West Onondaga Street, and Seymour Street); and 3) The back side of numerous active properties along the 300 block of West Onondaga Street. Instead, the trail leaves the Onondaga Creek corridor from Walton Street in order to skirt over to the multi-lane arterial known as South West Street, ducking under the elevated railroad bridge (New York, Susquehanna and Western Railway, Northern Division, Syracuse Branch), and running south along the "Service Road" side seven city blocks to West Onondaga Street, which it crosses. Most of this part of the trail had been previously inked for bicycles.

Cutting south through a vacant lot newly minted as green space, the creekwalk regains the creek corridor between West Onondaga and Temple streets, staying to the west side of the water, and running upstream through four street crossings—at Temple Street, West Taylor Street, Tallman Street, and Midland Avenue, respectively. At the Midland Avenue bridge, the trail winds up on the opposite (east) side of the water. Then the creekwalk parallels Dr. Martin Luther King West, formerly West Castle Street, for four blocks, one of them a street crossing at South Avenue. The path recrosses to the west side of the waterway at a bridge and street crossing at Rich Street, and then feeds into Lower Onondaga Park.

Near the now-vague boundary between Lower Onondaga Park and Kirk Park, South Avenue again interrupts, but at this juncture the creekwalk has been cleverly routed under the same South Avenue bridgework through which the creek itself flows. Several hundred feet later, the trail hugs the creek behind an antique park building made of stone and featuring a massive stone chimney. City planners have called it the Travelers' Rest Building; the name pays homage to a largely forgotten time period in the 1920s and 1930s when this part of Kirk Park was home to a seasonal Tourists' Camp run by the City Parks Department. Phase 2 ends at a trailhead parking lot at the intersection of Hunt and Rockland avenues, a block north of West Colvin Street.

=== Phase 3 ===
The creekwalk's as-yet unbuilt Phase 3 seeks to bring the trail all the way south to Dorwin Avenue in Syracuse's "Valley" neighborhood, close to the city's southerly corporate line, and further upstream along the path of Onondaga Creek. However, a large stretch of this run is already practically in place for many non-motorized recreationists. From the Hunt and Rockland avenues location, where Phase 2 ends with trailhead parking, there are another 1.3 miles of walkable or rideable, low or restricted traffic, mostly park-style roadways headed south. They are signed as Onondaga Creek Parkway or Onondaga Creek Boulevard west of the creek, and Kirk Park Drive, Vale Street, or Onondaga Creek Boulevard east of the creek. There are significant intersections at West Colvin Street, Elmhurst Avenue, West Brighton Avenue, West Newell Street, and then the southbound pavement ends at Ballantyne Road. Further upstream, the greenway along the channelized Onondaga Creek already exists as mowed grass along flood control dikes to either side, though much of it is fenced off, discouraging public access.

=== Ties to Other Trails ===
Back at the northern end, the creekwalk has, from the start, been envisioned as a trail that would interconnect with the Loop the Lake Trail long intended to circumnavigate Onondaga Lake, full completion of which along the southeastern quadrant of the lake still remains in doubt. Along the southwestern quadrant of Onondaga Lake, however, a direct Onondaga Creekwalk connection formally opened Dec. 31, 2020 from West Bear Street at Van Rensselaer Street, to and along Hiawatha Boulevard West, to that part of the Loop trail bridging the double-tracked CSX mainline and continuing along the southwesternmost side of Onondaga Lake toward State Fairgrounds. This new trail work counts as part of both the Loop the Lake Trail and the Empire State Trail projects, the latter of which is designed to traverse upstate New York generally along the path of the historic Erie Canal. Also, the portion of the Onondaga Creekwalk north of Water Street and south of West Bear Street now forms part of the Empire State Trail.
