= Inner Harbor, Syracuse =

Coordinates: 43.0610551°N 76.1623247°W

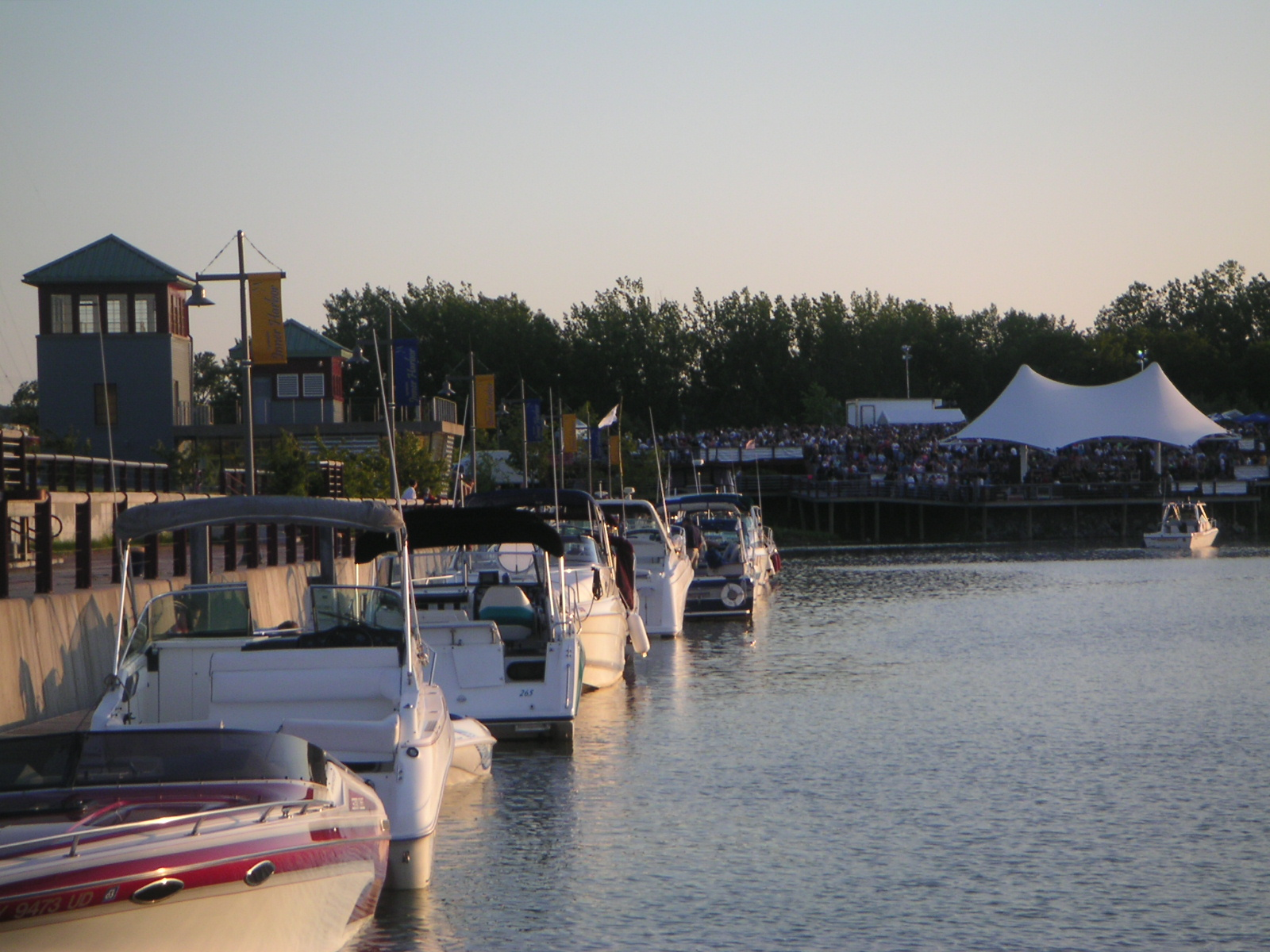
The harbor during a weekly block party.

The Inner Harbor is a former industrial quarter of Syracuse, New York, situated at the center of a larger district long colloquially known as Oil City, and since 1989 rebranded as the Lakefront. The waterfront zone was originally considered to be limited to just that area bounded by West Kirkpatrick, Solar, West Bear, and Van Rensselaer streets, but it has been gradually enlarged by the process of familiarity and promotion to include the opposite sides of some of those streets.

The water at Inner Harbor's center can be variously viewed as the outlet of Onondaga Creek, or as a human-made extension southeasterly of Onondaga Lake, or as a small, seldom-utilized part of the modern Erie Canal. It has been the scene of more than three decades of development or redevelopment proposals, sponsored by the State of New York or the City of Syracuse, some of which has come online in the late 2010s.

== Chronology of development ==
The central waterway appears on the area's U.S. Geological Survey topographical map from 1939 labelled as the Barge Canal Terminal, so called because it served as a dead-end southerly spur—through Onondaga Lake—off of the Erie Canal, after that system's 1918 modernization and re-routing. An older 1895 topographical map shows the naturally winding course of Onondaga Creek had by then been partially straightened in the district, but not exactly along the modern footprint.

Much of the acreage surrounding the water was developed by the Thirties for storage tank farms for fossil fuels. Gasoline, diesel/fuel oil, and other refined products were at first delivered by barge, and later by pipeline.

The area was first publicly targeted for redevelopment in June 1988. At that time, the phrase "Inner Harbor" was borrowed from Baltimore, Maryland, and first applied in Syracuse when Robert Congel of The Pyramid Companies drafted a district-wide framework with then-Syracuse Mayor Thomas G. Young for the gradual, public-private transformation of all of Oil City. Since that time, the most notable completions have been focused at Pyramid's Destiny USA mall on the north end, and significant redevelopment of old factory buildings in Franklin Square on the south end, where Pyramid was also involved.

Some of the fossil fuel tank farms were relocated under the city's eminent domain pressure to a new campus in the Town of Van Buren, off Herman Road, near the Thruway. That left large swaths of vacant, post-industrial acreage in the center of the zone. Some of this has been put to work as overflow parking for the mall. But, as for the rest, progress has been much slower than originally anticipated.

At the start, the Inner Harbor's only organic, native activity of any note was serving as home base for a substantial state canal maintenance facility, which historically included state-operated manufacture of its own fleet of various work boats.

In July 1993, the harbor area saw ground broken on that part of the Onondaga Creekwalk passing through. Expected completion was October 1993. The area would eventually qualify as a scenic waterfront park with the addition of park amenities and event facilities—including an overlook platform and amphitheater, and a sand beach volleyball court.

From May 1998 into 1999, the U.S. Army Corps of Engineers was commissioned to hydraulically dredge the entire waterway. At the time, it was reported to have not been done for 28 years. Up to 60,000 cubic yards of sediment were allowed to slowly settle out from a slurry pumped into a system of dikes established alongside Van Rensselaer south of West Hiawatha.

From about 2001 onward, New York State spent about $15 million upgrading its piers, building the harbor master’s station, and making other improvements—all in hopes that the work would ultimately draw some kind of economic interest to the waterfront. Instead, no marina materialized, few boaters came except for an occasional festival, and re-development plans stalled.

In 2011, the state Thruway Authority and its subsidiary Canal Corporation agreed to transfer 34 acres surrounding the Inner Harbor to the City of Syracuse, subject to certain conditions. The move came during the administration of Syracuse Mayor Stephanie Miner, and it was taken in hopes that her City Hall could do a better job of lining up a plan. Over the previous decade, the state had failed in three separate attempts to find a developer.

In 2012, Cor Development Co. based in Fayetteville, NY, was chosen on the strength of a $350 million proposal to turn the area into a residential, hotel, retail, and office center over the course of what was then said to be five to ten years.

The project soon hit two significant delays: A legal dispute over tax breaks with Stephanie Miner's mayoral administration, which the city ultimately lost; and a federal corruption prosecution over state bid-rigging allegations unrelated to Inner Harbor, a case in which two Cor executives were eventually found guilty but are now appealing.

In July 2016, the first of Cor's projects, a local branch of Marriott's Aloft Hotels, opened at 310 West Kirkpatrick Street.

In October 2016, a second hotel—an Element-branded extended stay—won tax breaks and broke ground. It was intended to share a circular driveway with Aloft and to also overlook the water from the south side, but the work was suspended at a very early stage. Through the 2020 construction season, the site remains a crushed-stone parking area, and it was reconfigured on Cor's maps as a future restaurant-retail project.

Nearby at 720 Van Rensselaer Street, a second Cor project, the first phase of the Iron Pier Apartments, started leasing both its ground floor retail and upper floors living spaces in August 2019.

From November 2018 into Summer 2019, the harbor had to be again dredged. It cost $10.3 million and was overseen by the state. The same land owned by the state along Van Rensselaer south of West Hiawatha was used as a settling site for the solids.

In September 2018, a Cor executive appeared before the Syracuse Common Council and again forecast the entirety of the development would take ten years. The graphic concept plan displayed at the time showed a total of eleven components, some of which are broken down into separate parts. So far, what's done is all or part of three components: The harbor master's house, which was previously built by the public sector; the Aloft hotel, which represents one of two projects intended to overlook the water from the south shore; and Iron Pier, which represents half of the planned set of mixed-use retail/residential.

Through late 2020, there are eight components still remaining to be started: townhouses fronting on Van Rensselaer and North Geddes; luxury apartments-parkview, situated close to the park's parking lot; luxury apartments-waterfront, which consists of two buildings to sit between Iron Pier and the water; an office building at the northwest quadrant of the intersection between West Kirkpatrick and Van Rensselaer; mixed-use retail/office, which is a set of three buildings conceived to occupy the zone between Solar Street and the water; retail/restaurant, which is a set of two buildings drafted so as to occupy the two docks; Onondaga Lake Science Center, a collaboration with SUNY College of Environmental Science and Forestry, Onondaga Community College, and LeMoyne College along the north side of the water; and a parking garage and office complex situated outside the block, southeast of the West Kirkpatrick and Solar intersection.

Also in September 2018, Cor was reported to be planning to start two buildings in Spring 2019—one of the two luxury apartments-waterfront condo's; and one of the three mixed-use retail/office buildings opposite the water. The latter building was reported to eventually house Cor's headquarters, moving into the city from Fayetteville. Through the 2020 construction season, there is little evidence either has been started.

In December 2019, the Inner Harbor area's first significant organic development—outside of Cor's official footprint—was green-lighted. Bankers Healthcare Group won tax breaks in exchange for committing to build a $39.7 million headquarters off Solar, between West Kirkpatrick and Spencer. BHG's building, parking, and grounds will generally be sited south across West Kirkpatrick from the Aloft Hotel on six acres that formerly hosted a school bus company. BHG plans a 5-story, 100,000-square-foot office that will house future staff additions, as well as existing staff moving from four separate offices in the Franklin Square and Armory Square areas.

In October 2020, the second significant near-Inner-Harbor development was announced. Equitable Financial Life Insurance Co. let it be known in an application for tax breaks that it wanted to spend $74 million moving more than 700 jobs from what was formerly known as MONY Towers downtown. By 2023, they planned to build a 125,000-square-foot building on 6.9 acres east of Solar and north of West Court, which is effectively a continuation easterly of West Kirkpatrick.

== See also ==
- Onondaga Creek
- Onondaga Creekwalk
