= Hotel Skyler =

Historic hotel in Syracuse, New York, US

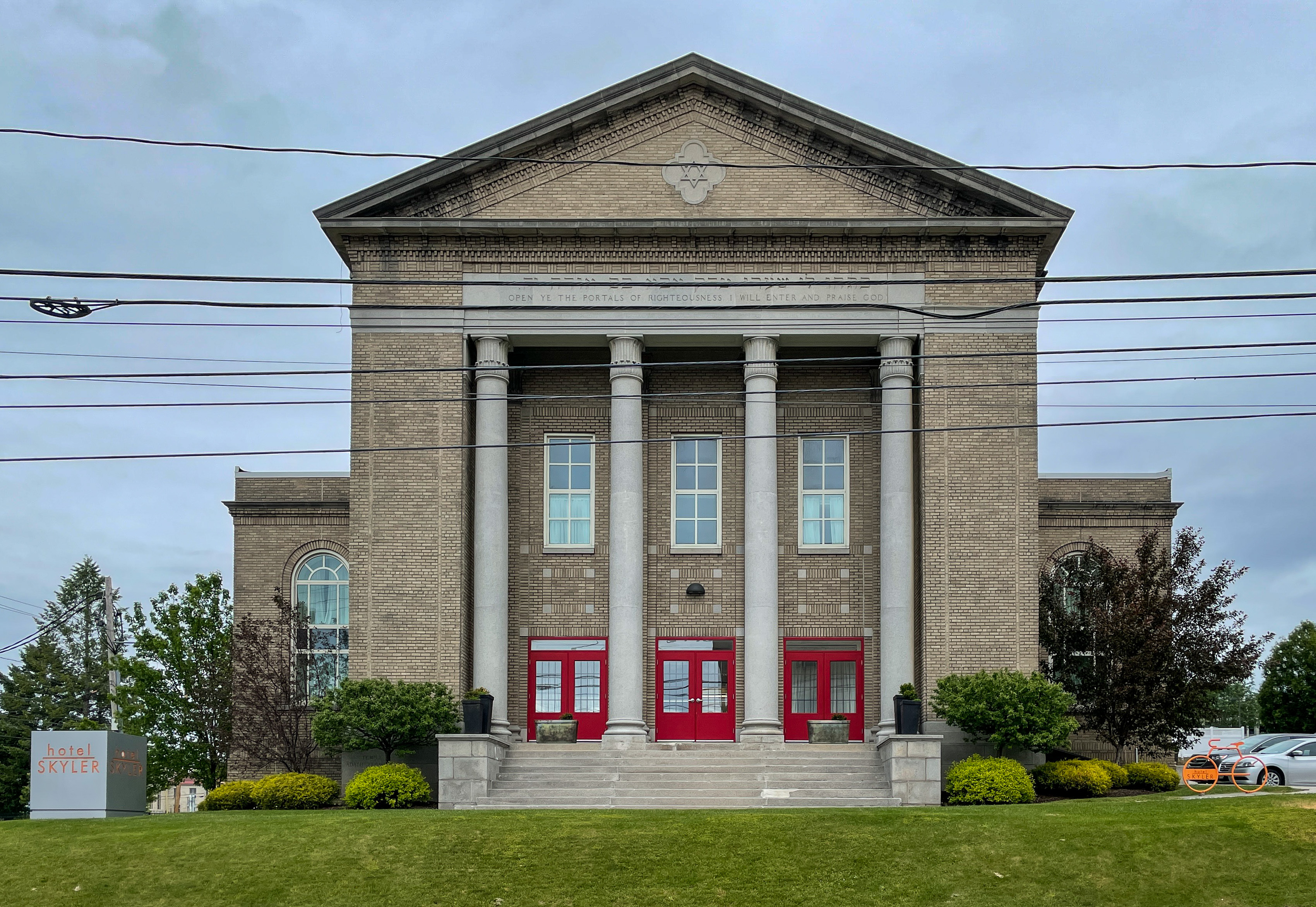

- Location within New York

General information
- Location: 601 S. Crouse Avenue, Syracuse, New York
- Coordinates: 43°02′38″N 76°08′10″W
- Completed: 1921

Design and construction
- Architect: Gordon Wright

The Hotel Skyler, whose full official name is Hotel Skyler Syracuse, Tapestry Collection by Hilton is a hotel in the Syracuse University area of Syracuse, New York, located in a former synagogue at 601 S. Crouse Avenue, down the hill from the Crouse-Irving Hospital.

== History ==
The building, built in 1921, was home of the Temple Adath Yeshurun for about 55 years.

The synagogue moved to a new building in 1968 and the 601 S. Crouse Avenue location was bought by the City of Syracuse as part of a planned urban renewal project. The urban renewal project fell through and the building largely stood vacant until 2011. Briefly in the 1970s, the Salt City Theatre Group was based there. In 2011, developer Norm Swanson bought the building and opened the Hotel Skyler, which he named after his grandson. Swanson bought the building from the city for $352,500 and tax benefits, and later spent nearly $7 million to renovate the space into the hotel.

It has been described as being Georgian Revival in style. It has four engaged columns.

The Hotel Skyler is the third hotel in the United States and the first in Syracuse to be certified LEED Platinum. It has a geothermal heating and cooling system, employing 68 geothermal heat pumps and a 499 foot deep well. Additionally, the facility utilizes LED lighting in public areas and low-flow bathroom fixtures in rooms.

In March 2024, the hotel was bought by Syracuse University to fill the hotel services needs when the on-campus Sheraton was converted into a student dormitory.

== Society of New Beth Israel ==
Society of New Beth Israel

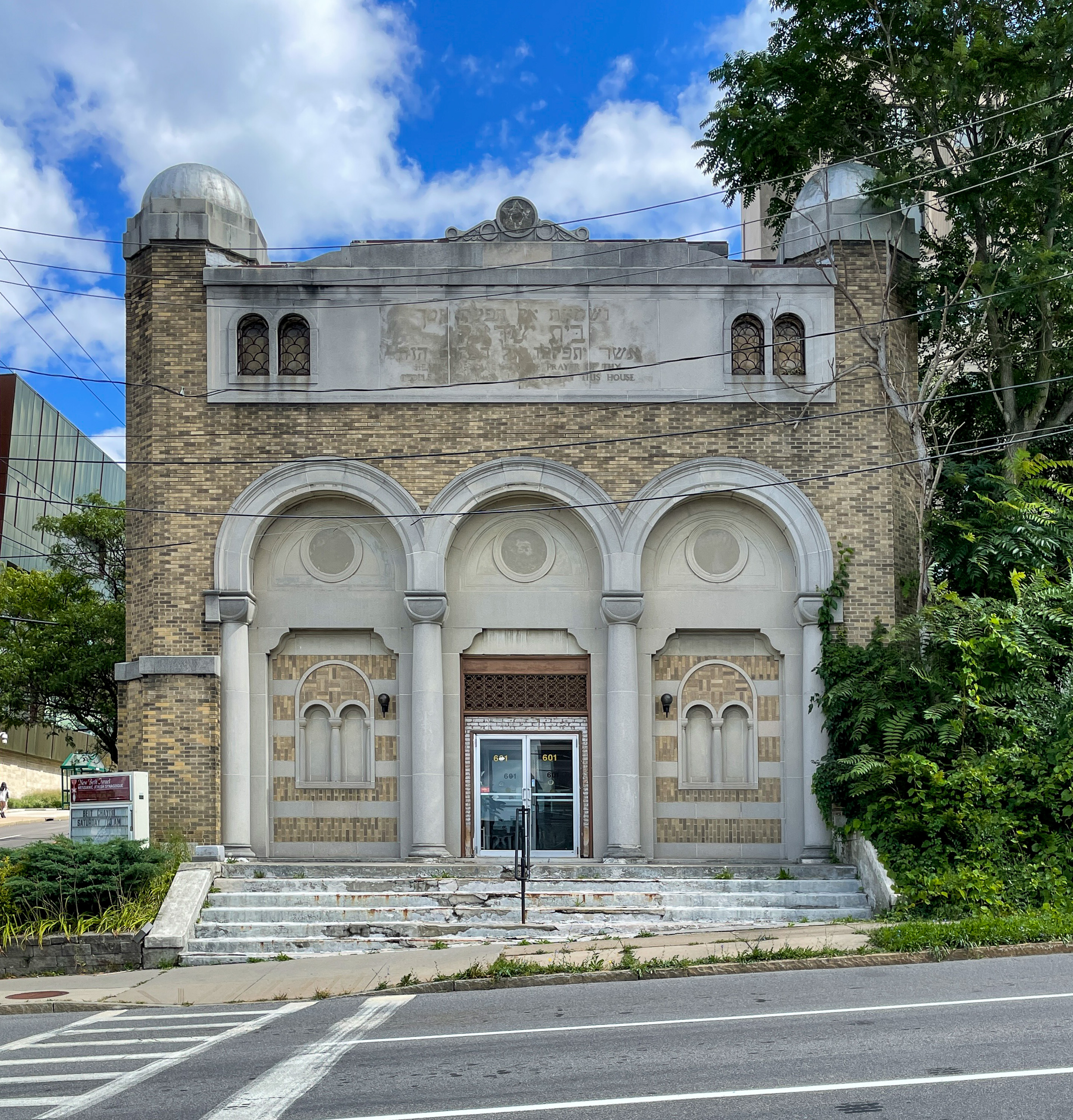
Facade on Irving Avenue

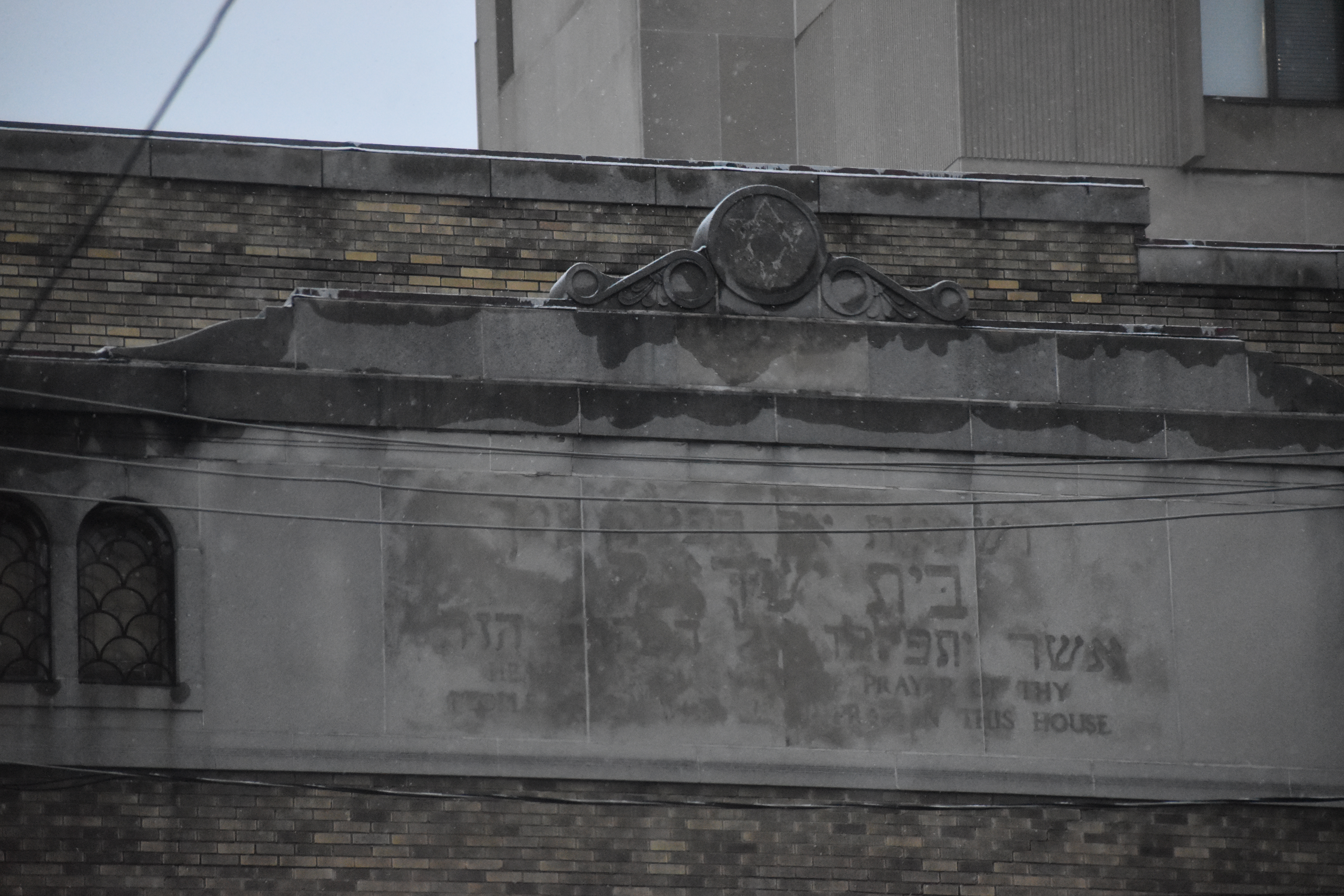
Legacy signage

Just across S. Crouse Avenue, facing onto Irving Avenue, was another synagogue, at 601 Irving, whose building also survives, and also has four engaged columns. It was the home of the Society of New Beth Israel, Syracuse, a congregation which was established in 1854. Their original building was known as the "Grape Street Shul". In 2019, this building was in use by a messianic congregation.

== See also ==
- Temple Society of Concord, another historic synagogue in the Syracuse University area
