= Long Branch Park =

Park in Syracuse, New York

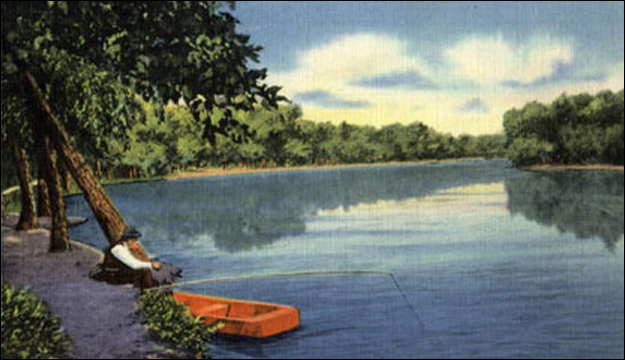
- Long Branch Park c. 1900
- Interactive map of Long Branch Park
- Location: 3813 Long Branch Road on north shore of Onondaga Lake; Geddes, New York
- Coordinates: 43°7′3″N 76°14′38″W

Long Branch Park is a public park in Onondaga County outside of Syracuse, New York, located in the town of Geddes, New York, on Long Branch Road near NYS Route 370 and John Glenn Boulevard. The park is situated on the northern shore of Onondaga Lake and is often misidentified as an extension of Onondaga Lake Park which wraps around the eastern shore of the lake to the south shore. Due to that misidentification, it is often assumed that Long Branch Park is located in Liverpool when it is actually located in Geddes.

Founded in 1882 by Ben and George Maurer, Long Branch Amusement Park was originally an amusement park with boxing arenas, an arcade and a trolley. The amusement park closed in 1938.

Syracuse's largest mall, Destiny USA is located to the south of the lake and features an original carousel #18 from the amusement park.

== Advertisements ==
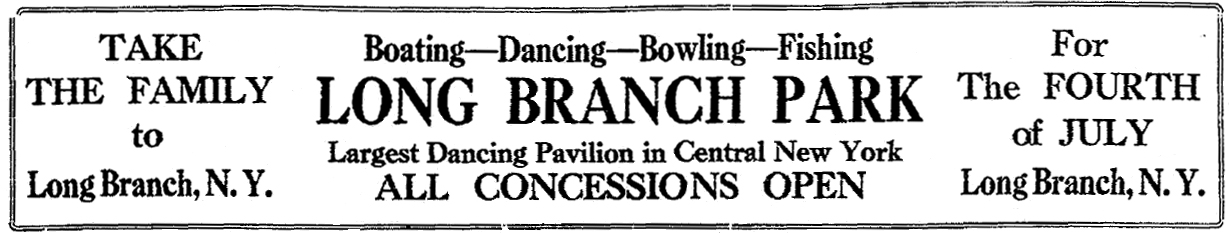
Long Branch Park - Fourth of July - (Boating - Dancing - Bowling - Fishing) - June 1923

== Park events ==
- Antiquefest - Annual event in July.
- Bavarianfest: First Sunday of August each year – Live music, dancing, German food and drink, Schuhplattler and folk dance performances, and Gemütlichkeit.
- Walk MS (Multiple Sclerosis) - Sponsored by MS Society - Early May.
- Scottish Games - Annual event in August, celebrated for over 69 years.
- Pagan Pride Day - Third Saturday in September, celebrated since 2000.
