= Robert Congel =

American real estate developer (1935–2021)

- Born: July 6, 1935; Syracuse, New York
- Died: February 3, 2021 (aged 85); Manlius, New York
- Known for: Developing shopping malls including Destiny USA

Robert Joseph Congel (July 6, 1935 – February 3, 2021) was an American real estate developer known for his foundation of Pyramid Companies and development of projects such as Destiny USA.

== Early life ==
Robert Joseph Congel was born in Syracuse, New York, on July 6, 1935. His parents worked in the family real-estate and construction businesses. He attended high school at the Christian Brothers Academy, graduating in 1954. He entered Fordham University studying math, but did not receive a degree, and left the university in 1958.

== Career ==
After he left Fordham, Congel founded R.J. Congel Construction Company, with help from his grandfather who provided a loan of $175 (equivalent to $1,953 in 2025). This company focused on development of apartments and offices. In 1968 he co-founded Pyramid Companies, a property development company initially focused on shopping plazas. By the 1970s it had expanded to larger shopping mall projects. He became known for holding regular company strategy sessions at 6:00 or 6:30 in the morning. In 1988, Congel's net worth was estimated at $200 million, a figure that had risen to $700 million by 2003. A profile in The New York Times that year described Congel's mall development strategy as "risking his own capital to get malls finished and retain control." Though the profile noted that Congel attempted to keep a "low profile," it also described him as leaving "trail of lawsuits" in his wake. He became known for partnering with financiers and making extensive contributions to friendly politicians while working on development projects. His company eventually became known as Pyramid Management Group.

One of the largest company projects was Carousel Center in Syracuse, which Congel began in the 1990s on the shores of Onondaga Lake. In the early 2000s, he presented a plan that would drastically expand Carousel Center, renamed Destiny USA, and make it the largest mall in America. As part of the project, he requested tax breaks from the state. Congel claimed that the project offered a chance for him to "improve his hometown", though others criticized his work, especially his aggressive efforts to gain tax breaks. In 2005, Congel described his goal for the mall to become " the No. 1 tourist destination in America," envisioning an eco-friendly mall that he claimed would "produce more benefit for humanity than any one thing that private enterprise has ever done." After receiving substantial tax breaks, the mall was expanded, but not to the extent that Congel initially described. Congel and Pyramid Companies also worked to redevelop Franklin Square and the Clinton Exchange building in the city.

By the time Congel handed control of Pyramid Management Group to his son in the late 2010s, it was the Northeast's largest privately held mall developer.

== Personal life ==
Congel married Suzanne Flanagan in 1961; they had five children. He was a trustee of various local organizations, including the Christian Brothers Academy, Le Moyne College, and, from 1984 to his death, Syracuse University. He was also on the Board of Commissioners of the Syracuse Housing Authority, the Metropolitan Development Association, and the Greater Syracuse Chamber of Commerce. He owned properties in Wayne County, New York, on Skaneateles Lake, and lived in Manlius, New York.

By the late 2010s, Congel was in failing health, and he died at his home in Manlius on February 3, 2021.
