= Alexander Brown House =

Historic house in New York, United States

- U.S. National Register of Historic Places
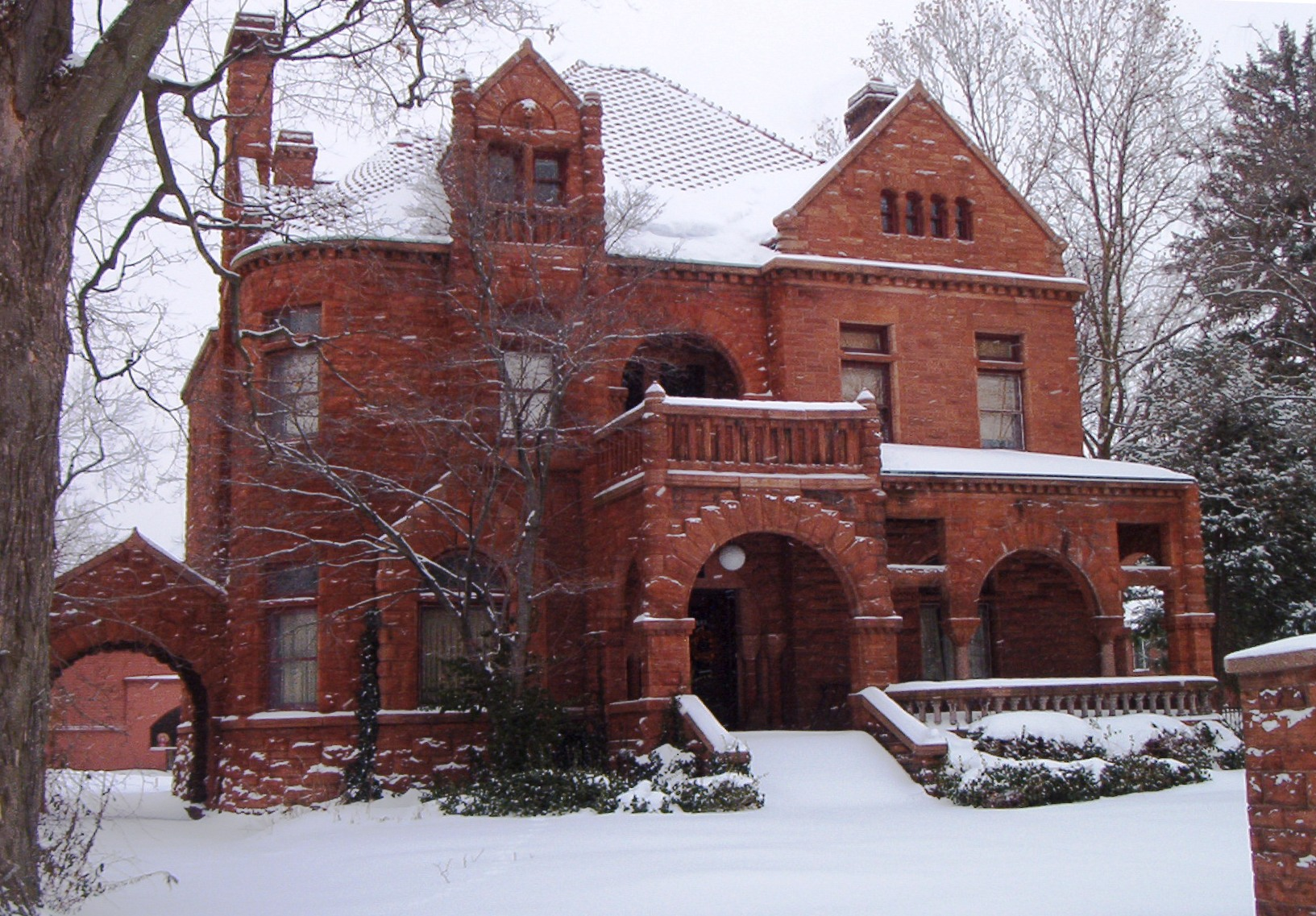

- Location within New York Location within the United States
- Location: 726 W. Onondaga St., Syracuse, New York
- Coordinates: 43°2′12.41″N 76°9′45″W
- Built: 1895
- Architect: Gordon Wright
- Architectural style: Romanesque
- NRHP reference No.: 88002376
- Added to NRHP: November 3, 1988

The Alexander Brown House, at 726 West Onondaga Street in Syracuse, New York, is a Richardsonian Romanesque mansion in Potsdam sandstone and Spanish tile home built in 1895. It was the home of Alexander T. Brown, inventor and co-founder of Franklin Motors and the Brown-Lipe-Chapin Company, a firm that was absorbed into General Motors.

Brown was a successful inventor and manufacturer. His specialty was transmissions adapted from bike chain derailleurs, but is also known for inventing the shifting carriage that allowed typewriters to have multiple cases or fonts, patented a breech loading shotgun that became Hunter Arms and as any inventor would he added technology into the house. He added such engineering features to the house as a terra cotta shaped glass tile-covered skylight to bring natural light into the attic, a basement to attic hydraulic elevator, and a house-wide vacuum cleaning system.

The 5,500 sf carriage house is known to have held up to ten cars and had a car lift installed so that the projects he was working on could be brought up and out of the cold and into his workshop where his drivers were often known to have lived and assisted. He held the largest collection of military weaponry in private hands during his day and was also known to have kept a live bear in what was once a stable for the horses who once pulled his carriages from the carriage house behind the main house on West Onondaga Street.

The house was listed on the National Register of Historic Places in 1988.
