= Destiny USA =

Shopping mall in Syracuse, New York

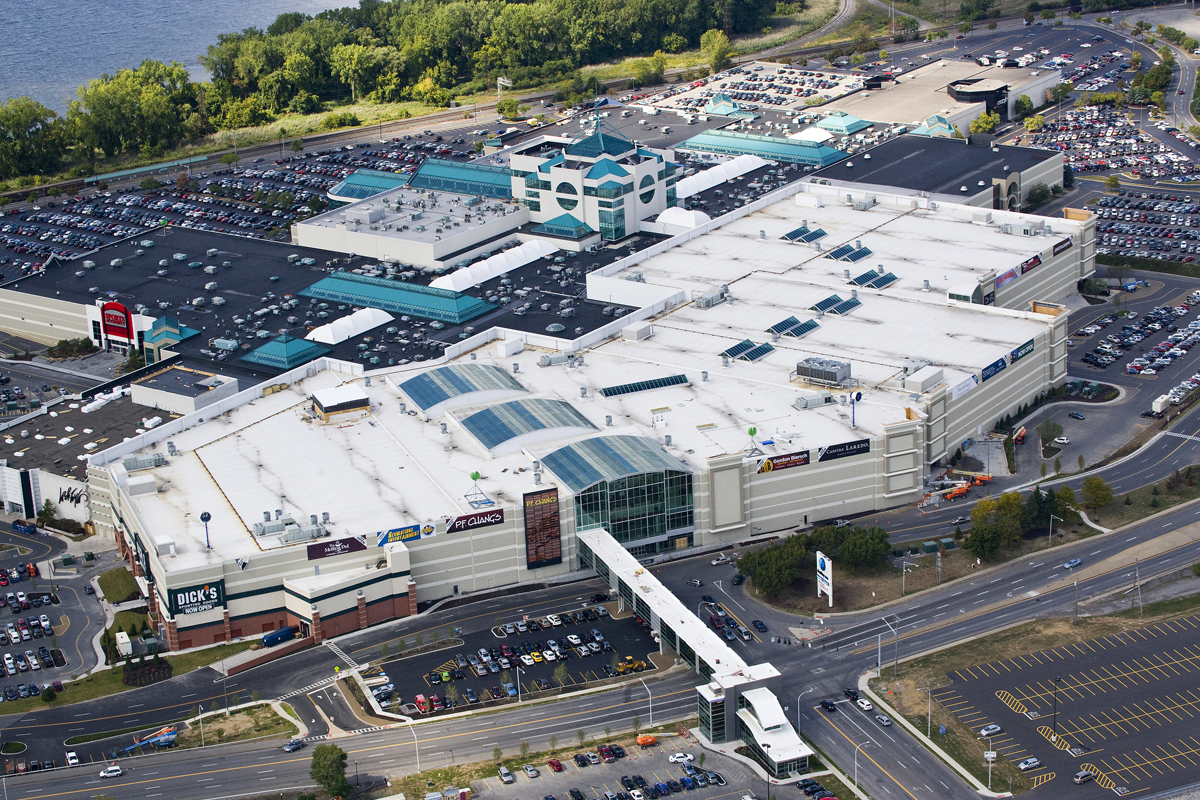
- Destiny USA in 2012
- Location: Syracuse, New York, United States
- Coordinates: 43.0709°N 76.1703°W
- Address: 1 Destiny USA Dr, Syracuse, NY 13204
- Opened: October 15, 1990 (35 years ago)
- Developer: The Pyramid Companies
- Manager: Pyramid Management Group
- Owner: Pyramid Management Group
- Num. of stores: 239
- Num. of anchor tenants: 18
- Floor area: 2,400,000 sq ft (220,000 m^{2})
- Floors: 6 (4 retail)
- Parking: 5,500
- Website: destinyusa.com

Destiny USA (stylized as destiny usa and also known by its former name Carousel Center) is a six-story super-regional shopping, dining, and entertainment complex on the shore of Onondaga Lake in the city of Syracuse, New York, United States. It is the largest shopping mall in the state of New York and the 10th largest in the country. In 2021, Destiny USA was included among the top 20 most visited shopping centers in America, attracting over 26 million visitors a year.

Destiny USA opened on October 15, 1990, as Carousel Center. The mall has six aboveground floors and one underground floor. The lower three floors and the underground floor are used for retail shops. The first and second floors span the length of the mall and house the various shops, vendors, restaurants, and entertainment venues, with the major food court and namesake carousel located on the second floor. The third floor includes a 19-screen Regal Cinemas, restaurants, and entertainment options. The fourth floor is primarily administrative offices. The underground floor, known as the Commons floor, houses medium-sized stores, a chapel, kiosks, and two underground parking garages. The Commons floor does not span the full length of the mall, and is contained within the original mall structure built in 1990.

Destiny USA has outside parking surrounding the mall on nearly all sides. On the Hiawatha Boulevard side, additional parking lots are located across the street from the mall and a pedestrian bridge was built to connect the parking lot to the second floor of the 2012 addition. Parking includes one aboveground and two underground parking garages. The mall is served by CENTRO buses. There are main entrances on nearly all sides of the mall. Other entrances are located through the anchor stores and from the underground parking lots.

== History ==
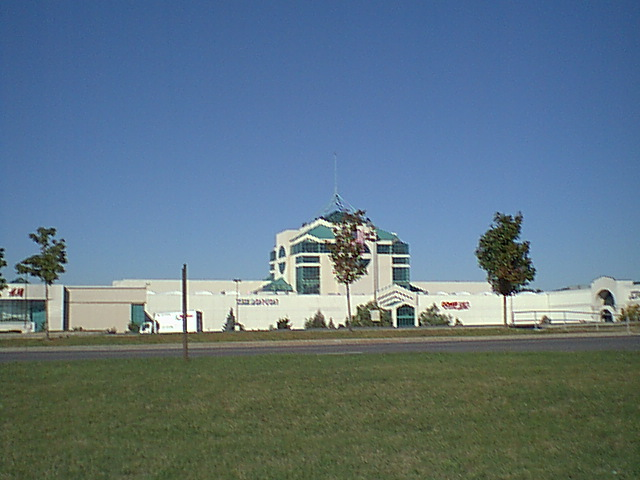
Destiny USA in its Carousel Center form, before expansion in 2007

=== Background and construction ===
The site of Destiny USA was originally a landfill named Marley Scrap Yard, surrounded by several square blocks of oil tanks, collectively named "Oil City". South of these oil tanks sat the Franklin Square industrial neighborhood. In 1987, The Pyramid Companies studied redevelopment of the neighborhood. In July 1987, The Pyramid Companies announced plans for a 1,000,000 sq ft (93,000 m^{2}) shopping center at the scrap yard site. The plan caused controversy with other local shopping centers and malls. The Galleries of Syracuse, a smaller mall (now offices) had recently finished construction in Downtown Syracuse and there was concern that the mall at Oil City would put an end to downtown retail.

Two of the biggest opponents to the project were the competing mall developers in the area, Wilmorite Corp. and Eagan Real Estate Inc, which both operated several malls in Syracuse's suburbs. Wilmorite, which was building the Great Northern Mall in the nearby town of Clay, was accused by the Syracuse city government of using associates in Connecticut to form the "Citizen's League for an Environmentally Acceptable Northeast," which lobbied against construction of the Carousel Center mall at Oil City. Eagan meanwhile filed criticism of the mall, claiming that a 25-percent drop in downtown retail sales would occur if the mall were built. It proposed an additional downtown mall with a "Walt Disney-like attraction."

During construction the mall faced several delays, primarily around environmental cleanup, as the site is a brownfield cleanup site. The mall opened on October 15, 1990, as Carousel Center, named for the 1908 Philadelphia Toboggan Coasters (PTC) carousel, PTC #18 operating within the mall.

=== 1990s ===
When it opened, Carousel Center featured a range of upscale and popular chains. Anchors included Bonwit Teller, Kaufmann's, Chappell's, Steinbach, JCPenney, Lechmere, and Hills. A basement "Commons" area featured covered parking and additional junior anchors, including The Rx Place and Filene's Basement.

Another unique feature of the mall was the Skydeck, which was on the top levels of the central tower. This offered an events space that would be used for fundraisers, proms, fashion shows, concerts, and other public and private uses.

In 1990, The Pyramid Companies began clearing oil tanks south of the mall for a strip center called Carousel Landing, which would feature 650,000 square feet of additional retail.

In 1992, Chappell's became The Bon Ton because of a merger with the parent company.

An additional anchor space was built for Lord & Taylor in 1994.

By 1995, Carousel Landing had still not been built due to its potential environmental impact. By 1996, The Pyramid Companies finally got approval to condemn the oil tanks.

In 1996, Steinbach was replaced with Home Place, a Northeast-based upscale home furnishings store. Nobody Beats the Wiz also opened in 1996 in the Commons level.

In November 1997, less than a month after Lechmere closed as a result of parent company Montgomery Ward eliminating the chain, the Pyramid Companies announced they would build an expansion to Carousel Center that would double the mall size instead of building Carousel Landing. Under this plan, the expansion would house about 150 new stores and three anchors, with many of the stores new to the market. The Pyramid Companies officials claimed the expansion would be complete by the year 2000.

In 1998, CompUSA store and a Kahunaville restaurant opened in the Commons Level and Best Buy opened in part of the former HomePlace/Steinbach location.

In 1999, Hills was acquired and rebranded by Ames Department Stores. In March 1999, DSW Shoe Warehouse opened in part of the former Lechmere. In October 1999, Bally Total Fitness opened with a grand opening featuring the cast of Baywatch. The Bally Total Fitness filled in the remaining part of HomePlace/Steinbach location that was not occupied by Best Buy.

=== 2000s and potential expansions ===
In March 2000, Bonwit Teller shuttered their location at the mall as the chain filed for bankruptcy. In the same year, the space became the first American outpost and mall location for H&M. In May, Kaufmann's Furniture Galleries opened in the mall.

In 2001, The Pyramid Companies announced an expansion project which would triple the size of the mall, rather than doubling it as previously planned. The new project proposed to rename the mall from Carousel Center to "Destiny USA". The Skydeck was closed for new administrative offices for the complex. It would also create a large Central New York Visitors Center inside the mall. However, The Pyramid Companies needed public funds and tax breaks to make the project possible and people worried the mall would be obsolete before all of it was recompensated. Despite this, The Pyramid Companies continued to unveil further plans for Destiny USA. Eventually, the large tax breaks and the magnitude of the project would cause much controversy.

In 2004, DSW moved down into the Commons Level while Circuit City took its place. Circuit City previously operated a pocket store in the mall before closing in 2009, after the company failed to find a buyer for itself.

In August 2005, Sports Authority moved in as a new anchor store.

In September 2006, Kaufmann's became Macy's.

In 2007, The Pyramid Companies proposed the first phase of Destiny USA: a new addition that would add 800,000 square feet (74,000 m^{2}) to Carousel Center. This would make Destiny USA the largest mall in New York and the 6th largest in the country. The project was planned to be a green building, powered entirely by renewable resources.

In late 2009, it was announced that Destiny USA would use RFID technology, but would require tenants to turn over profits from the data tracking to Pyramid.

=== 2010s: Expansion and name change ===
In May 2011, an agreement between Citigroup and The Pyramid Companies was finalized and the addition continued. Destiny USA was set to feature a retail mix including entertainment, luxury, and outlet stores. Documents from the trial showed several stores leased in the new expansion. In November 2011, Destiny USA became the largest mall in New York and the 6th largest in the country. Parts of the new addition opened, mostly featuring temporary holiday stores and signs advertising more stores planned for the future.

By late summer of 2012, the CarouselCenter.com webpage merged in with the DestinyUSA.com webpage, as new signage went up. In August 2012, the mall's name officially changed to "Destiny USA", ending all references to Carousel Center. New major stores in the mall included Burlington Coat Factory. New amusement activities opened including WonderWorks, Dave and Buster's, Billy Beez Indoor Play Park, APEX Entertainment, a bowling and restaurant venue with a bar and dance area, RPM Raceway Indoor Karting, and Canyon Climb, the world's largest indoor rope course.

On June 14, 2013, Regal Cinemas opened their IMAX & RPX screens.

On January 4, 2015 it was announced that Nordstrom Rack would open a 33,357 square-foot store, on the first level in fall of 2015.

In October 2016, At Home opened as a new anchor, replacing Sports Authority, which closed earlier in the year as a result of the company’s bankruptcy.

A $48 million, seven story, 209-room Embassy Suites hotel opened at the Destiny complex in September 2017.

=== 2020s to present ===
In June 2020, JCPenney announced that it would close its Destiny USA location. In August 2020, Lord & Taylor went bankrupt and closed all of its stores.

In 2021, a new Regal Cinemas 4DX theater was announced, along with renovations to the theaters. An indoor trampoline park called Get Air was also announced. An upstate New York mall manager said "Retailers were hesitant to sign deals during the pandemic, but as business is beginning to return to normal, leasing activity is picking up".

In 2024, Nordstrom Rack announced it would be closing. In May 2024, At Home announced they would close in August.

In July 2025, Mystery Bins, a store that sells heavily discounted merchandise from Amazon, announced their opening in the former JCPenney space. Mystery Bins opened on August 2, 2025.

On July 8, 2025, it was announced that IKEA will be opening a store at the mall. It will occupy the space formerly home to At Home, which is over 80,000 square feet, in fall 2025. IKEA opened on November 21, 2025.

== Security ==
On January 23, 2021, a 14-year-old boy was stabbed in the back near the Destiny USA parking lot. In response, Destiny USA announced a change to its parental escort policy two weeks later. Before the change, minors only had to be accompanied by an adult from 4 p.m. to closing on Fridays and Saturdays. After the change, minors had to be accompanied by an adult at all times, every day. Destiny USA also gave the Syracuse Police Department (SPD) more space on the fifth floor so officers could have a "more expansive, functional work area."

On December 20, 2021, an unnamed man was shot in the leg at the upper parking lot of Destiny USA. Two months later, a gun was fired in a bathroom during an attempted robbery. Following this incident, Destiny USA hired two to five officers to work as security each day. After Juli Boeheim, wife to former basketball coach Jim Boeheim, had her purse stolen at gunpoint by a 12-year-old, Destiny USA hired more SPD officers to patrol the mall and its parking lots. In addition, probation officers were hired to make sure that individuals on probation were not at the mall. On February 24, 2023, a 14-year-old shot at "a group he was in a dispute with." Four months later, an argument inside the mall escalated into a shooting outside one of the entrances of the mall.

By August 9, 2023, Destiny USA installed Flock Safety cameras at every vehicular entrance. The cameras track license plates and alert the police if a wanted or stolen vehicle arrives at the mall.

== See also ==
- Onondaga Creekwalk
- Inner Harbor, Syracuse
