= Onondaga Creek =

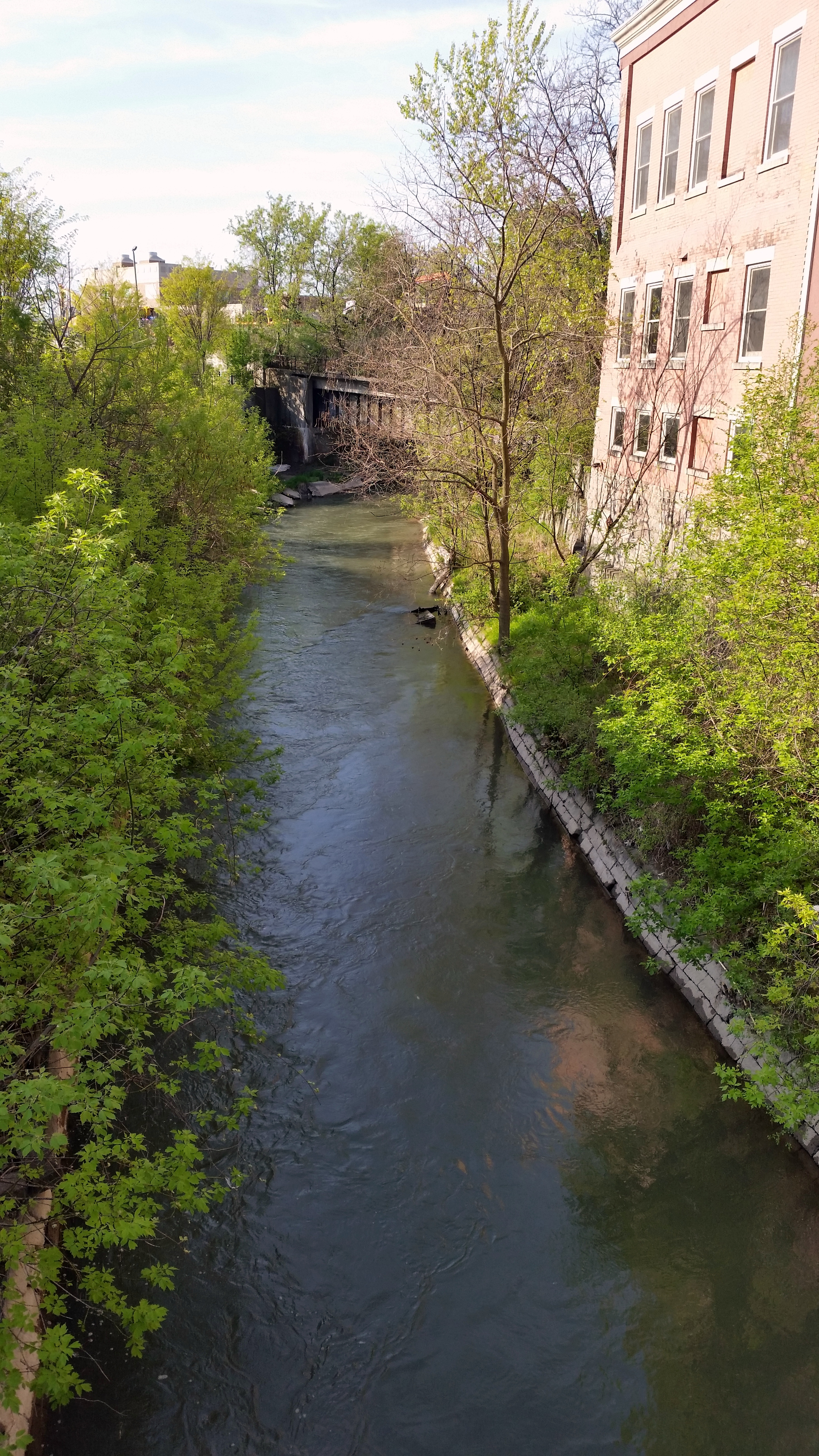
- Onondaga Creek (2016)

- Onondaga Creek watershed

- Location of the mouth in New York

Location
- Country: United States
- State: New York
- County: Onondaga County, New York

Physical characteristics
- Source
  - location: Vesper
- Mouth: Onondaga Lake
  - location: Syracuse
  - coordinates: 43°4′4″N 76°10′41″W
- Length: 27.2 mi (43.8 km)
- Basin size: 111 sq mi (290 km^{2})
- Discharge
  - location: Syracuse
  - average: 183 cu ft/s (5.2 m^{3}/s)
  - minimum: 23 cu ft/s (0.65 m^{3}/s)
  - maximum: 2,040 cu ft/s (58 m^{3}/s)

Onondaga Creek is a major tributary of Onondaga Lake which is located in Onondaga County, New York. The headwaters of the creek originate 27 miles (43 km) south of the city of Syracuse near the hamlet of Vesper, in the town of Tully, New York. The creek flows north through the Tully Valley and through the city of Syracuse where it empties into Onondaga Lake.

The major tributaries of Onondaga Creek are the West Branch of Onondaga Creek, Hemlock Creek and Rattlesnake Gulf.

The creek is navigable by canoe and kayak from the southern border of the city to Onondaga lake.

== History ==
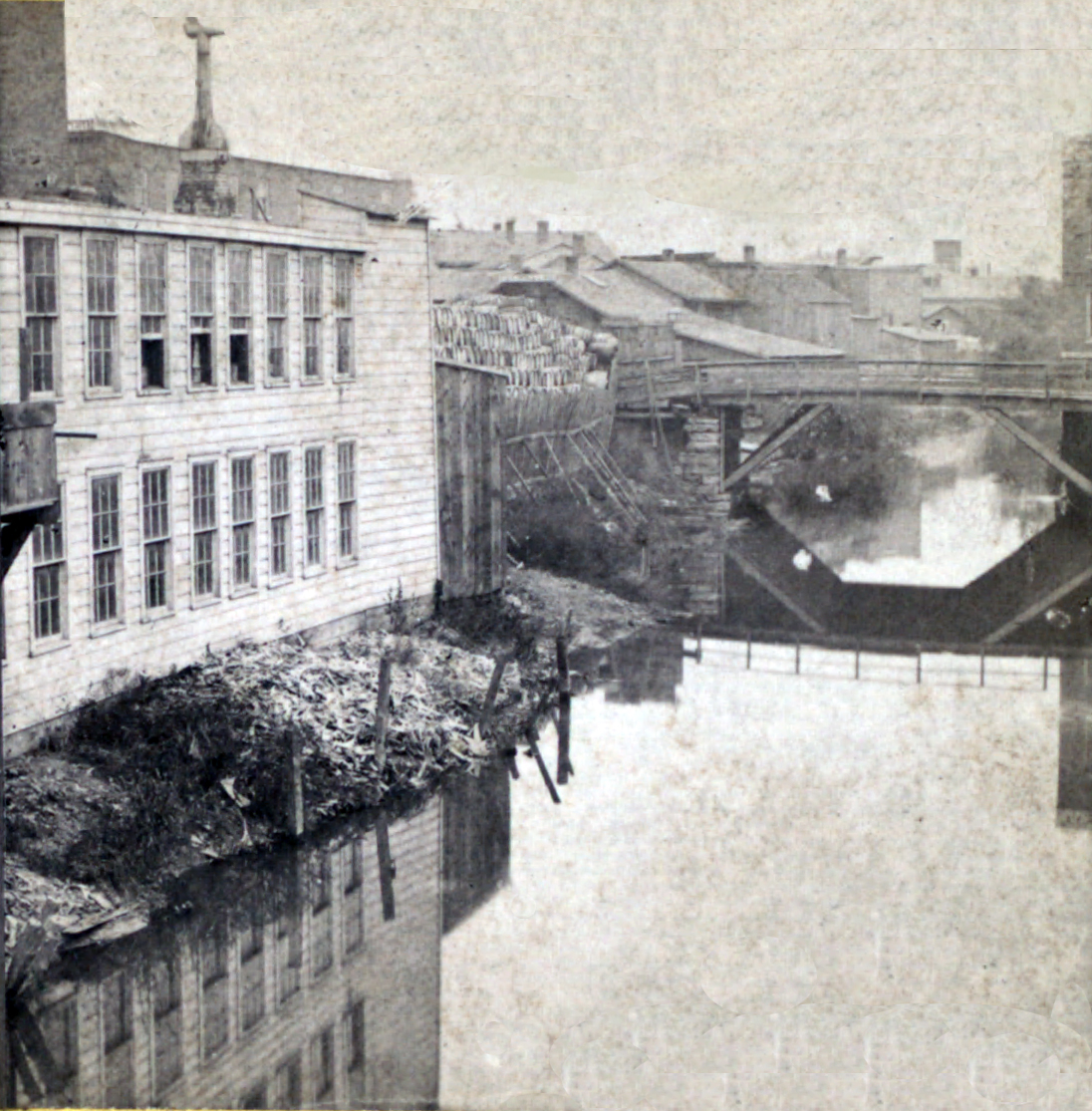
Onondaga Creek at Fayette Street about 1885

In the late 1940s, the Army Corps of Engineers built a flood control dam and reservoir within the Onondaga Nation Reservation for the purpose of regulating the peak flow that reaches the city of Syracuse. The structure influences the creek's flow pattern only in the event of a large runoff when a portion of very high flow is stored in the reservoir and later released back into the creek when the water recedes.

== See also ==
- List of rivers of New York
- Onondaga Creekwalk
