= O.M. Edwards Building =

- Edwards, O.M., Building
- U.S. National Register of Historic Places
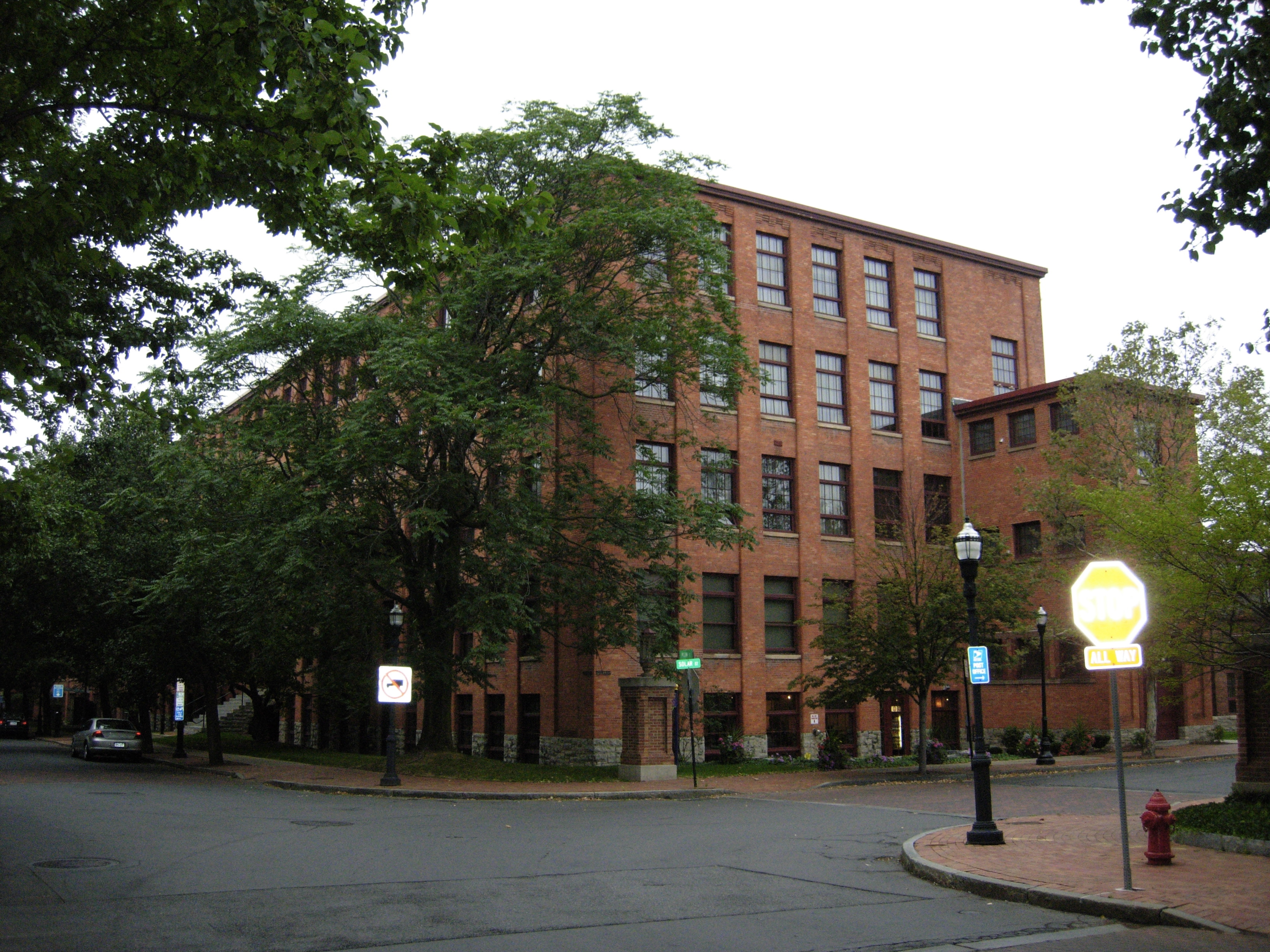

- Location within New York Location within the United States
- Location: 501 Plum St., Syracuse, New York
- Coordinates: 43°3′24″N 76°10′16″W
- Built: 1906
- Architect: Gordon Wright
- Architectural style: Modern Movement
- NRHP reference No.: 00001689
- Added to NRHP: January 26, 2001

O.M. Edwards Building is located at the intersection of Plum and Solar Streets in Syracuse, New York, United States. It is a representative example of an early twentieth century manufacturing plant. It was designed by Gordon Wright, and built in 1906. The building was added to the National Register of Historic Places in 2001.
