= Milton J. Rubenstein Museum of Science and Technology =

Museum in Syracuse, New York, United States

Coordinates: 43.04703°N 76.15534°W

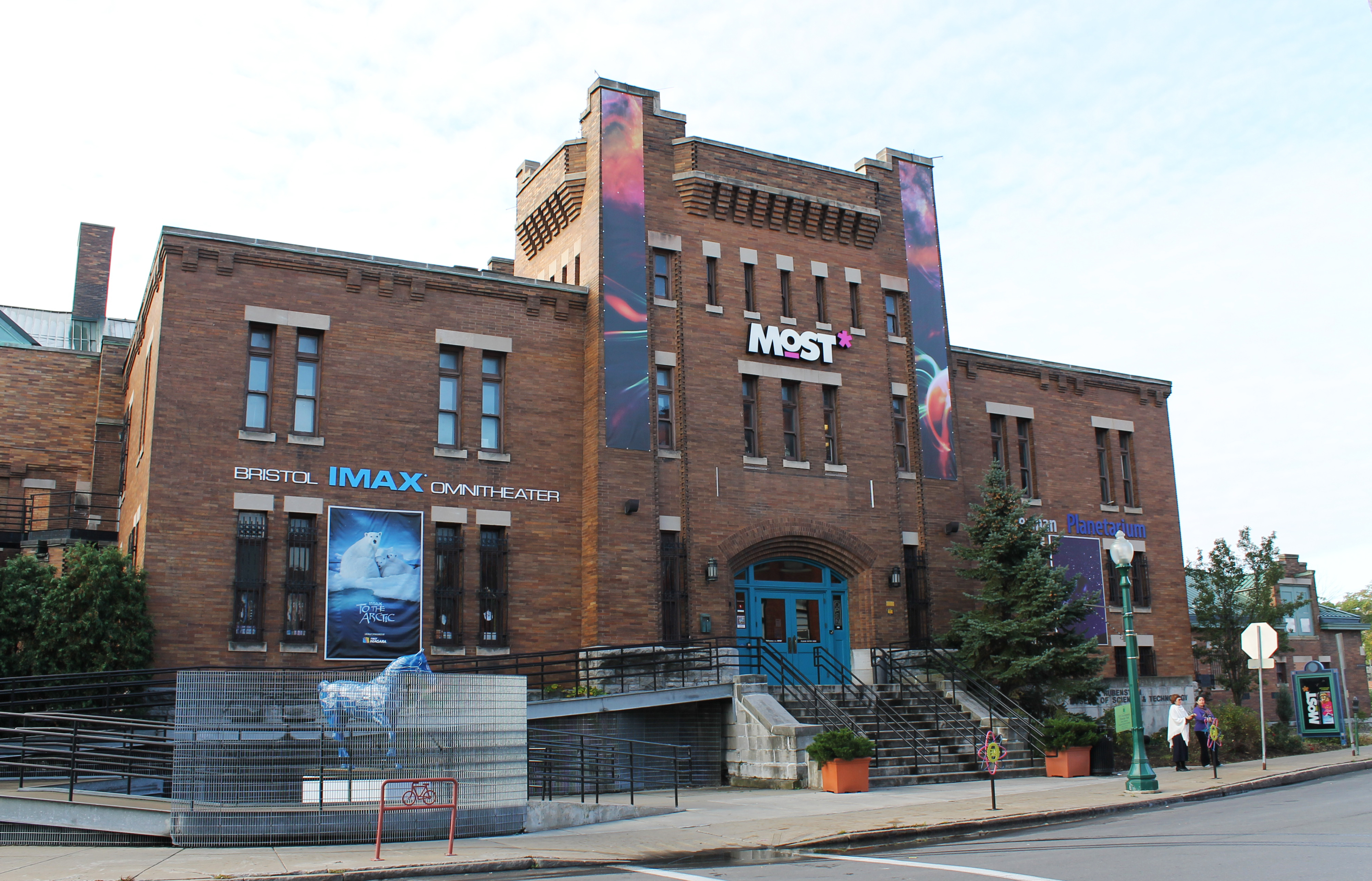
- Entrance to the Milton J. Rubenstein Museum of Science & Technology faces Franklin Street.
- Former name: The Discovery Center
- Established: 1981
- Location: Syracuse, New York
- President: Lauren Kochian
- Website: www.most.org

The Milton J. Rubenstein Museum of Science and Technology (often referred to as the MOST) is a science and technology museum located in the Armory Square neighborhood of Downtown Syracuse, New York. The Museum includes 35,000 square feet of permanent and traveling exhibits, Science Shop, and several programs and events. The MOST is located in the former Syracuse Armory.

Permanent exhibits include: Innovation Station, Dino Zone!, Earth Science Discovery Cave, Upstate Medical University Life Sciences, Deconstructed presented by Micron, Science Playhouse, Technotown, BUILD, PLAY, National Grid Energy: Powering Our Future, World of Pollinators, Telecommunications Lab (formally Ham Radio Station), Machines and Makers, and the Gem & Mineral Gallery.

The MOST has opened a brand new domed theatre, the National Grid ExploraDome, and media lab, MolinaCares Media Lab, in April 2022, in place of the former Bristol IMAX Omnitheatre."The $2.6 million ExploraDome renovation began in March 2021 and updated the theatre’s screens, seating, and surround sound. The renovations also introduced a second-generation laser-illuminated, ultra-high-resolution Laser CineDome projection system, which is only the second to exist in the world and features true 6K resolution playback." Two documentary films and a planetarium show play each day that the museum is open to the public, with featured films changing quarterly.

== History ==
In 1977 the Junior League, National Council of Jewish Women and the Technology club started to plan the opening of this institution. In 1979, the goals were set to develop a center where scientific and technological information would be presented to involve the general public, students and the technical community around Syracuse, to use participatory exhibits and educational programs extensively, and to encourage creativity and involvement. The original museum, then known as the Discovery Center, opened on November 15, 1981, in a storefront at 321 South Clinton Street in downtown Syracuse.

By the late 1980s, museum officials began to consider a new location for the Museum, which had become an important community asset visited by more than 800,000 people. At the same time, local officials were considering what to do with the old Armory in downtown Syracuse. In 1992, New York State and the federal government accepted The Discovery Center's proposal to open a Museum of Science & Technology in the Armory building. On October 27, 1992, the MOST, hosting hands-on exhibits and the Silverman Planetarium, opened to the public. In January 1997, the 214-seat Bristol IMAX Omnitheater – the only domed IMAX theater in New York State – opened. In 2021, the Museum announced the closure of the IMAX Omnitheater as well as the planetarium as part of a major project to upgrade the theater to digital.

KC2APG was the Federal Communications Commission (FCC) club call sign issued for the amateur radio station at the MoST. On March 11, 2014, the amateur radio station received the FCC vanity call sign of K2MST.

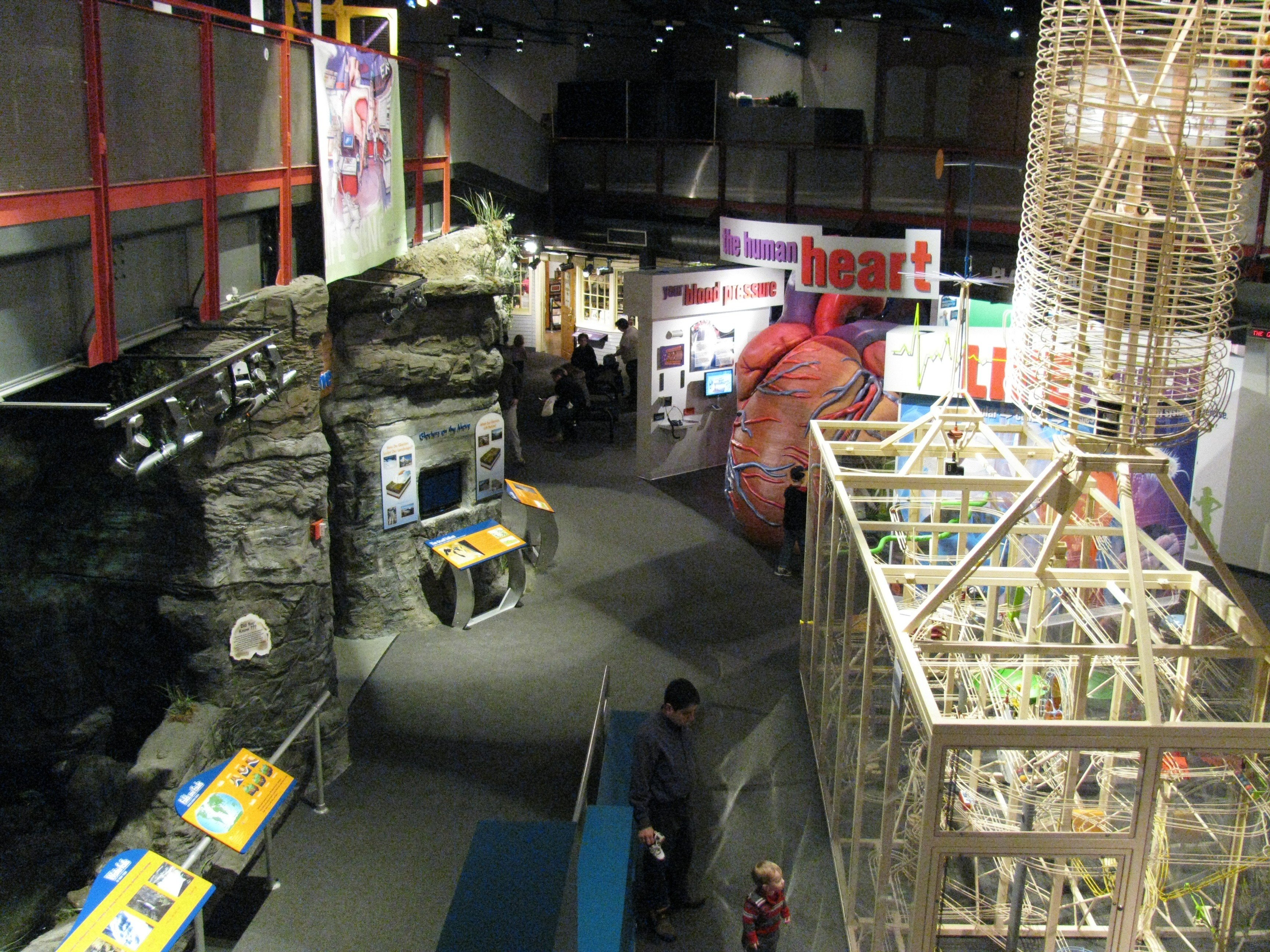
Museum Exhibits
