= Gordon Wright (architect) =

American architect (1866–1950)

- Born: 1866; Massena, New York
- Died: 1950 (aged 83–84)
- Education: Syracuse University
- Occupation: Architect
- Children: Marjorie Wright (architect)

Gordon Wright (1866-1950) was an architect in New York State. He designed several buildings which are listed on the National Register of Historic Places for their architecture.

He was born in Massena, New York in 1866. He graduated from Syracuse University with degrees in civil engineering and architecture.

He opened an architectural office in Syracuse in 1892.

He partnered with Charles R. Ellis from 1931 to 1938. His daughter Marjorie Wright, who also studied architecture at Syracuse University, was associated with the firm from 1919 until her death in 1949. (Note: Marjorie Wright designed the Kappa Alpha Theta House at 306 Walnut Place, in 1928 in Tudor Revival style (see ); it is NRHP-listed as a contributing building in the Walnut Park Historic District.)

Works include the following, but this article has been significantly altered losing a significant piece of his body of work:

- Alexander Brown House, 726 W. Onondaga St., Syracuse, NY, NRHP-listed
- O.M. Edwards Building, 501 Plum St., Syracuse, NY, NRHP-listed
- Smyrna Elementary School (1941), School St., SE of NY 80, Smyrna, NY, NRHP-listed
- Mizpah Towers (1915), Montgomery and East Jefferson Streets, Syracuse, NY, NRHP-listed
