= Franklin Square, Syracuse =

Coordinates: 43°3′25″N 76°9′26″W

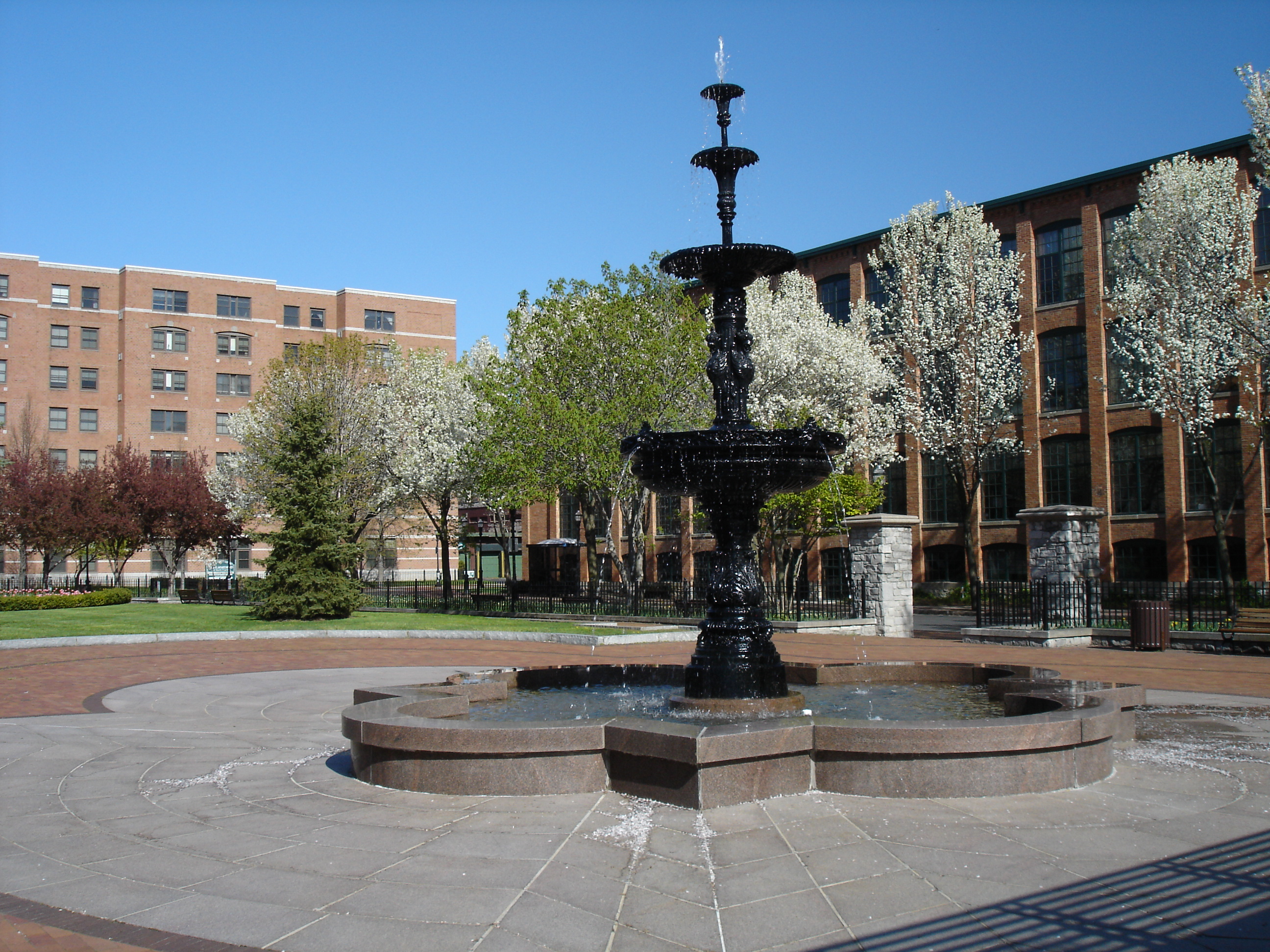
Franklin Square

Franklin Square is a former industrial neighborhood, turned residential and commercial, in Syracuse, New York. Officially it is part of the larger Lakefront neighborhood, which in turn is one of Syracuse's 26 officially recognized neighborhoods.

== History ==
The neighborhood sprang up as a result of the salt industry in Syracuse. From 1797 to 1904 around 12 million tons of salt were produced in the area. After the Civil War, with the salt industry on the decline, Franklin Square became an automobile production area. The H. H. Franklin Manufacturing Company, from which the neighborhood's name comes, produced cars in this area from 1902 to 1934. Transmission producer New Process Gear had a factory on Franklin Square before they closed it and moved to the Syracuse suburb of DeWitt in 1961. Franklin Square also held manufacturing of handbags, textiles, telephone booths, and dried milk.

== Redevelopment ==
By the 1980s nearly all of Franklin Square's industry had vanished. The Pyramid Companies began working to redevelop the square in 1987. They began by remaking an old factory for New Process Gear into office space. The company's head, Robert Congel sold his last property in the area in 2013.

The Pyramid Companies also developed the park in the center of Franklin Square, instead of paying taxes. This included adding a statue of Benjamin Franklin and a fountain. The project to revitalize Franklin Square was studies as a "model project" in a 1991 article in Economic Development Review.
