= Penrith Museum of Fire =

Firefighting museum in New South Wales, Australia

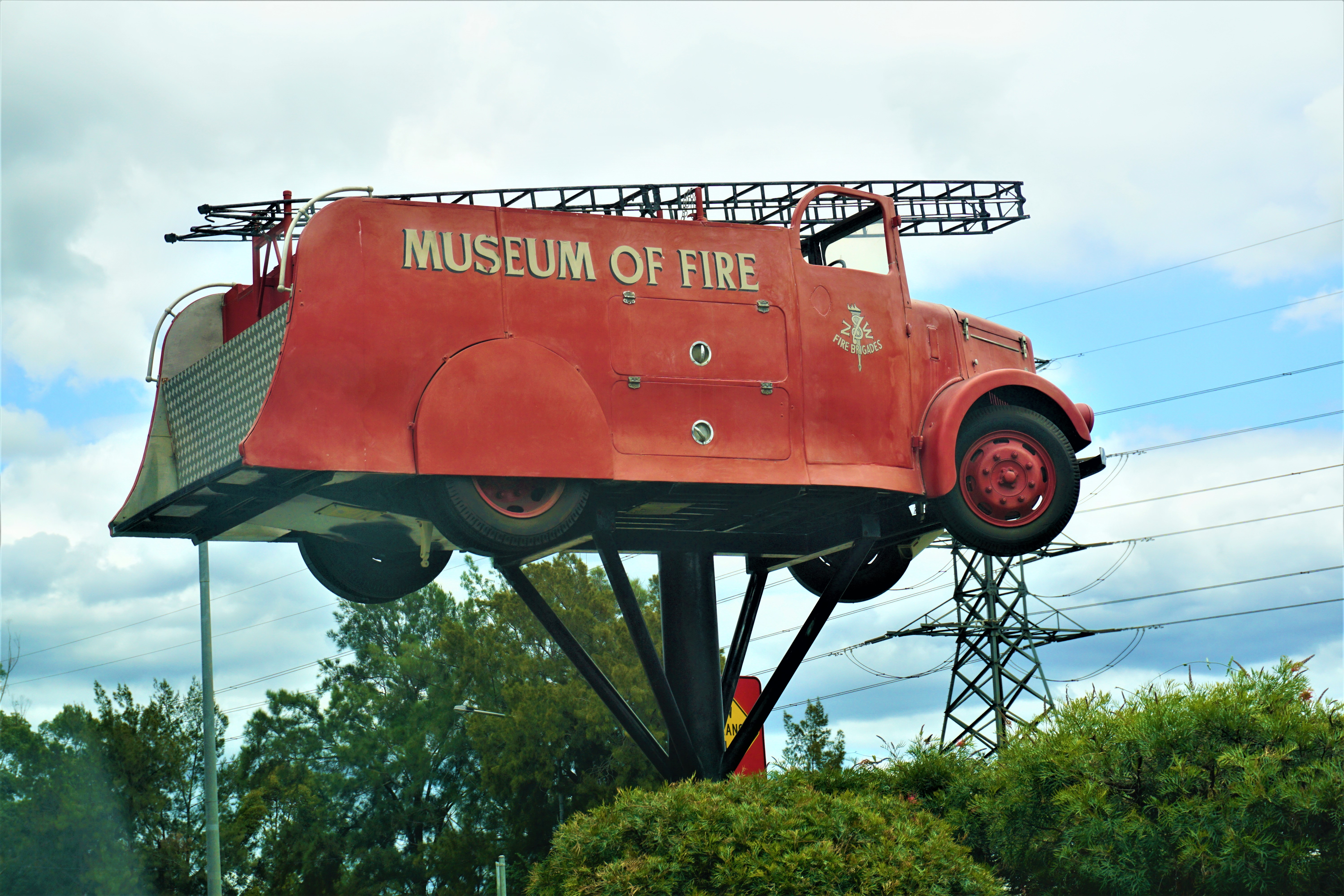
- An exhibition at the museum, 2017

- Location of the museum in greater metropolitan Sydney
- Former name: Historic Fire Engine Association of Australia
- Location: Museum Drive, Penrith, New South Wales, Australia
- Coordinates: 33°44′52″S 150°41′37″E
- Type: Firefighting museums
- Website: museumoffire.net

New South Wales Heritage Register
- Official name: Fire and Rescue NSW Heritage Fleet
- Type: State heritage (movable / collection)
- Designated: 25 February 2013
- Reference no.: 1902
- Type: Fire Control Objects (movable)
- Category: Utilities – Fire Control
- Builders: Various

New South Wales Heritage Register
- Official name: Shand Mason Curricle Ladders (1898); No.4 Curricle Ladders
- Type: State heritage (movable / collection)
- Designated: 25 February 2013
- Reference no.: 1899
- Type: Fire Control Objects (movable)
- Category: Utilities – Fire Control
- Builders: Shand Mason & Company

New South Wales Heritage Register
- Official name: Shand Mason 7 inch Manual Fire Engine (1869); No. 1 Manual Engine; No. 1 Manual Pumper
- Type: State heritage (movable / collection)
- Designated: 25 February 2013
- Reference no.: 1898
- Type: Fire Control Objects (movable)
- Category: Utilities – Fire Control
- Builders: Shand Mason Company

New South Wales Heritage Register
- Official name: Dennis Big 6 Fire Engine (1939); No. 132 ME (within Museum of Fire)
- Type: State heritage (movable / collection)
- Designated: 3 December 2004
- Reference no.: 1718
- Type: Fire Control Objects (movable)
- Category: Utilities – Fire Control
- Builders: Dennis Bros; NSW Fire Brigades workshops

New South Wales Heritage Register
- Official name: Ahrens Fox PS2 Fire Engine (1929); NO. 8 ME (within Museum of Fire)
- Type: State heritage (movable / collection)
- Designated: 3 December 2004
- Reference no.: 1717
- Type: Other – Utilities – Fire control
- Category: Utilities – Fire Control
- Builders: Ahrens Fox Co.

New South Wales Heritage Register
- Official name: Ford 21W Fire Brigade Mobile Canteen (1942)
- Type: State heritage (movable / collection)
- Designated: 25 February 2013
- Reference no.: 1900
- Type: Fire Control Objects (movable)
- Category: Utilities – Fire Control
- Builders: Ford Motor Company; NSW Fire Brigade Workshops; Gough Brothers & F. G. O'Brien

New South Wales Heritage Register
- Official name: Shand Mason Fire Engine (1891); Big Ben; No. 18 Steamer (within Museum of Fire)
- Type: State heritage (movable / collection)
- Designated: 3 December 2004
- Reference no.: 1716
- Type: Fire Control Objects (movable)
- Category: Utilities – Fire Control
- Builders: Shand Mason & Co of London

New South Wales Heritage Register
- Official name: NSW Fire Brigades No 10 Vehicle Number Plates; Number 10 vehicle number plates (collection) (within Museum of Fire)
- Type: State heritage (movable / collection)
- Designated: 5 April 2002
- Reference no.: 1519
- Type: Contents (movable)
- Category: Government and Administration

New South Wales Heritage Register
- Official name: Edward Smith Headquarters Switchboard (1909)
- Type: State heritage (movable / collection)
- Designated: 25 February 2013
- Reference no.: 1901
- Type: Telecommunications Facility
- Category: Postal and Telecommunications
- Builders: Edward Smith

The Penrith Museum of Fire is an Australian firefighting museum that contains heritage-listed former operating and stored for preservation fire service vehicles located in Penrith, Sydney, Australia. The provenance of the firefighting vehicles date from 1841 to 1998. The fleet of vehicles was added to the New South Wales State Heritage Register on 25 February 2013.

In addition to the Fire and Rescue NSW Heritage Fleet, included in the museum are the heritage-listed:

- 1898 Shand Mason Curricle Ladders, designed and built by Shand Mason & Company of London from 1898 to 1898. It is also known as Shand Mason Curricle Ladders (1898) and No. 4 Curricle Ladders; added to the New South Wales State Heritage Register, also on 25 February 2013;
- 1869 Shand Mason 7 inch Manual Fire Engine, designed and built by Shand Mason Company of London from 1869 to 1869. It is also known as Shand Mason 7 inch Manual Fire Engine (1869), No. 1 Manual Engine and No. 1 Manual Pumper; added to the New South Wales State Heritage Register, also on 25 February 2013;
- 1942 Ford 21W Fire Brigade Mobile Canteen, the motor and chassis designed and built by Ford Motor Company, the body designed and built by NSW Fire Brigades workshops, and the interior built by Gough Brothers & F. G. O'Brien from 1943 to 1944. It is also known as Ford 21W Fire Brigade Mobile Canteen (1942); added to the New South Wales State Heritage Register, also on 25 February 2013.
- 1909 Edward Smith Headquarters Switchboard, designed and built by Edward Smith in 1909. It is also known as Edward Smith Headquarters Switchboard (1909); added to the New South Wales State Heritage Register, also on 25 February 2013.
- 1939 Dennis Big 6 Fire Engine, the chassis designed and built by Dennis Bros, Guildford, England and the body designed and built by NSW Fire Brigades workshops in 1939. It is also known as Dennis Big 6 Fire Engine (1939) and No. 132 ME; added to the New South Wales State Heritage Register on 3 December 2004;
- 1929 Ahrens Fox PS2 Fire Engine, designed and built by Ahrens Fox Co, Cincinnati and Ohio in 1929. It is also known as Ahrens Fox PS2 Fire Engine (1929) and No. 8 ME; added to the New South Wales State Heritage Register, also on 3 December 2004;
- 1891 Shand Mason Fire Engine, designed and built by Shand Mason & Company of London in 1891. It is also known as Shand Mason Fire Engine (1891) and Big Ben; No. 18 Steamer; added to the New South Wales State Heritage Register, also on 3 December 2004; and
- NSW Fire Brigades No 10 Vehicle Number Plates, designed and built in 1910 by unknown private contractors to the then NSW Government registering authority. It is also known as Number 10 vehicle number plates (collection); added to the New South Wales State Heritage Register on 5 April 2002.

== History ==
=== Historic Fire Engine Association of Australia ===
On 13 March 1969 a meeting was held at Turramurra, which resulted in the formation of the Historic Fire Engine Association of Australia (HFEA). Collectively, the association's eleven members possessed some fifteen vehicles. Following the association's first meeting, contact was made with the Board of Fire Commissioners of NSW and a longstanding relationship was formed between the two bodies, with the Board's president, L. Verrills, being appointed as patron. At this time, the New South Wales Fire Brigades was still using a wide array of fire engines of different vintages. "Standby" vehicles, which were fitted with pre-war, open-cab (Braidwood) bodies, were stored strategically around the suburbs to cover "breakdowns".

In 1971, the HFEA first sought to preserve a fire engine for its historic value, successfully acquiring a Leyland FT3 pumper. Five years later, the Board of Fire Commissioners announced that a section of the new training college at Alexandria would be set aside for a Museum: the association was invited to establish and administer the new museum. The museum was completed in 1979. The following year, the museum was the proud recipient of four significant fire engines, formerly under the custodianship of the Museum of Applied Arts and Science (now the Powerhouse Museum). These were a fine addition to the museum's collection; however, the Board soon found itself constrained to expand the training college facilities – by utilising the space then occupied by the museum.

Following consultation between the board and the museum during May 1980, a solution was found. The Board agreed to fund the costs involved in securing a lease with the Maritime Services Board and establishing the museum in a section of wharves four and five, at Walsh Bay. Two more bays of the building were later sub-leased for the purpose of providing a vehicle workshop area and, on 10 January 1981, the new museum opened for business.

At this stage, the entire staff were volunteers, mostly evenly divided between Board and private owners. As a result of a Government decision on a changed use of the wharf, the Museum was obliged to move in 1984 to No. 7 Wharf, Circular Quay, on a lease renewable yearly, but with no guarantee of permanency because of proposals re Circular Quay Bicentennial Redevelopment. The Board's Transport Department moved the collection, and the Board met the rental costs for a smaller space. A task force recommended the appointment of a full-time Director, the museum began to generate an income, and in 1985, almost broke even financially; however, later that year, the museum was once again forced to relocate

In September 1985 the museum was re-established in the old Power House at Penrith, and on 16 November 1986, the Museum of Fire was officially opened.

=== Fire & Rescue NSW – Heritage Fleet ===
The involvement of Fire & Rescue New South Wales in the preservation of old equipment can be traced back to 1916. During that year, No 4 Shand Mason Steamer was approved for retention as a "museum exhibit". It is not known to which museum the engine was destined, however, and unfortunately, nothing appears to have eventuated - the engine disappears from the records in 1918.

With the withdrawal of the last of the manual engines in 1930, two (along with the Shand Mason Curricle Ladders) were retained, and were subsequently used in parades and demonstrations. Over the ensuing years, these vehicles were stored at various fire stations.

During the early 1960s, the Board of Fire Commissioners handed over five fire engines to the Museum of Applied Arts & Sciences (Powerhouse Museum) for custodianship. These included:

- A 1916 chain-drive Garford, which had survived since the late 1930s by being utilised as a hose-winder for "Volunteer Fireman State Championships".
- An 1891 Shand Mason Steam Fire Engine - one of the most significant, engines to be preserved. Having been replaced by the Ahrens Fox PS2 motorised pumper, the steamer was kept at various stations as a "standby" pumper, until after the post-war years. In 1962, it was restored by the Board's workshops and was presented to the Museum of Applied Arts & Sciences, (Powerhouse Museum), for display purposes.
- The Ahrens Fox PS2 – a super-pumper, and once the "pride of the fleet".

In April 1969, the Board retained a Garford Hale pumper, the last of its type to be withdrawn from service. In 1974, the Board of Fire Commissioners consented to preserve the Dennis Big 6 (used as a funeral engine)', the Ford Mobile Canteen, and the "Scout Car". These were preserved by leasing them to the Historic Fire Engine Association of Australia, in response to their offer to store and care for them. Since that time, the "Heritage Fleet" collection has progressively grown and now comprises forty-six fire engines. This number will continue to increase under the terms of the Museum of Fire's Acquisition & Collection Policy.

=== 1898 Shand Mason Curricle Ladders ===
The Number 4 Shand Mason, 15-metre (50 ft) Curricle Ladders (1898) were ordered by the Metropolitan Fire Brigade in 1897, for use at Newtown fire station. The ladders are of a telescopic design and were pulled by a single horse. Following the ladders' arrival in 1898, the Newtown firemen were given a course of instruction. An additional man and horse were subsequently placed at Newtown once the men were conversant with the use of the ladder. A report by Charles Bown (President of the Fire Brigades Board) stated that the ladders proved to be "a very valuable addition to the equipment of the Brigade". Whilst attached to Newtown station, the Curricle Ladders was one of four sets of ladders involved in operations to extinguish one of Sydney's most famous major fires - the Anthony Hordern & Sons fire, at Haymarket, in 1901. 'No other fire in Sydney's history has evoked more publicity than the Anthony Hordern & Sons fire of Wednesday 10 July 1901'. This fire destroyed five major high-rise buildings, in which 1200 people were employed. Five people were killed in this blaze: four were burnt to death having been trapped inside the buildings, and another fell 37 metres (120 ft) to his death in Gipps Street (he jumped when it became obvious that the brigade's largest ladders could not reach him). These Curricle Ladders operated at this fire alongside another heritage-significant fire engine: No. 18 Shand Mason Steamer (1891) and today, they again stand side by side, on permanent display at the Museum of Fire, Penrith. In 1907, the Curricle Ladders appeared in a Fireman's Manual of Instruction with a brass number "3" attached to its hose box, suggesting that at the time, it was attached to Circular Quay fire brigade. This is further supported by a list of the Metropolitan Fire Brigade plant dated: 1 June 1909. Three months later, it was transferred to Headquarters fire station. By July 1913, the Curricle Ladders were at Darlinghurst Fire Station, from where it responded on the 18th of that month to a fire at No. 100 Brougham St, Darlinghurst, in which ten drays and three lorries were alight. It appears that the ladders were not much used at Darlinghurst after that. On 10 December 1917, Station Officer Arthur Wickham recommended that the curricle ladders be removed from Darlinghurst, for since the installation of a motorised engine in September 1913 (with its thirty-five foot ladder), the horse-drawn curricle ladders had not attended a call of fire. District Officer George Grimmond replied, "I do not consider it advisable to remove same owing to the risk in this portion of this district". He further advised Mr Wickham that the situation might be reconsidered when a "motor and 65-foot ladder combination set" could be installed at Darlinghurst. On 29 November 1922 the Curricle Ladders re-appear at Headquarters: awaiting repairs. They were no longer being drawn by horses; but rather, were towed by truck. The horse-drawn era of the fire brigade was fast drawing to an end, and by this time there were only sixteen brigade horses remaining in Sydney - all of them in the suburbs. The much-needed repairs did not take place, however, until after 26 July the following year. The brigade workshops were too busy to attend to them immediately, and so in the meantime, it was used in connection with the painting of Headquarters. The repairs were carried out after the painting was completed. It is known that the ladders were in service at Newcastle in June 1924, and that they returned to the Sydney Fire District c. 30 April 1925. After being withdrawn from service, the Curricle Ladders were presented to the Powerhouse Museum. In 1979, they were reclaimed by the NSW Fire Brigades and presented to the Museum of Fire, Penrith.

=== 1869 Shand Mason No. 1 Manual Fire Engine ===
1869 Shand Mason No. 1 Manual Fire Engine is a survivor from an era of development and change, not only of fire fighting equipment and brigade organisation, but also of systems of government and their policies.

No.1 manual pumper was manufactured by the Shand Mason Company of London during a period when there was no statutory control or coordination of Sydney's fire protection. At the time this vehicle commenced its service, Sydney's fire protection consisted of a number of autonomous volunteer fire companies as well as the Insurance Companies Brigade (formed in the early 1850s) and thus would have been originally purchased by one of these early brigades or companies. By the time the manual had become a curiosity, preserved for display purposes, statutory control was well established and the NSW Fire Brigades was a statewide fire fighting service. This engines four decades of service is therefore associated with an era in which fire protection in Sydney and NSW progressed from independent, mid-nineteenth century fire companies to a statutory, twentieth-century statewide organisation.

In the year of the manual's manufacture (1869) fire brigades in Sydney were using a variety of fire fighting appliances. It was a time of intense development and competition between the manufacturers of fire fighting equipment, with English companies such as Shand Mason and Merryweather trying to out perform each other with their respective products. It was a great period of transition in fire engines. Horse-drawn engines had largely replaced hand-drawn ones. Manually pumped engines were being challenged by the more powerful steam fire engines, however, both were being used side by side in by the Sydney Insurance Companies Brigade. If a volunteer company agreed to place itself under the control of the Insurance Brigade's Superintendent at fires, then it would receive assistance, both financially and in terms of the loan of equipment which might include a steam powered pumper. Volunteer companies which refused to be "controlled " in such a manner had no support. Consequently, steam-fired engines were largely out of the question - they were simply too expensive. For these companies manual engines were an affordable appliance to maintain and operate and they were something a volunteer company could realistically purchase through a consistent fundraising effort.

At the inception of the Metropolitan Fire in 1884 the plant included two steam engines, two manuals and a ladder truck. In 1909, just prior to the NSW Board of Commissioners taking control, the plant included some thirty manuals. Even with the first motorised pumper being introduced in 1906, manuals continued to be used. Many of them were eventually fitted with turbine pumps. In 1909 the Annual Report states 'On October 14, Messers T Green and Co., exhibited to the Board a method of conversion of manual engines to petrol motor power, which appears to have much promise' These were mainly used at country stations, however, with the last one being withdrawn from Alstonville in 1931. This 1869 Manual somehow managed to escape such modification and is, apart from minor alterations, largely intact. The last manual fire engines were withdrawn from service in 1930.

The No.1 Manual's service period commenced during the era of pre-Federation Government. This administration was largely inadequate in its attempts to control and co-ordinate fire protection in the City of Sydney due to its long-lasting procrastination) until it finally passed the Fire Brigades Act (1884). The Manual's service also extended into the era of post-Federation Government, which initiated statewide co-ordination and control through the Fire Brigades Act (1909).

The Shand Mason Manual is documented as being located at Headquarters (now City of Sydney Fire Station) from 1903 to 1909. Its history prior to 1903 is uncertain. It can reasonably be suggested that its early service would have been with either the Insurance Companies Brigade and/or a volunteer company. Indeed, there is a long-term oral tradition among fire-fighters and fire engine enthusiasts that it is the same engine that was owned by the Royal Alfred Australian Volunteer Fire Company No.1 from 1871 (christened "the Pioneer" in honour of the company's founder, Andrew Torning). That particular manual was located at the Volunteer Company's engine house in 1900 when the premises were auctioned. Documentary evidence does not yet conclusively establish the provenance of either engine during the intervening three years (1900–1903). By 1914 the No.1 Manual appears to have been a spare appliance at Newcastle City, at which time it was sent to Stockton.

On 30 June 1926, the Shand Mason manual was used in a display of ancient and modern fire engines featuring replicas of fire fighting equipment dating from 120 BC, which were constructed at the brigade workshops. This display was carried out in the presence of His Excellency the Governor of NSW, Admiral Sir Dudley de Chair and his wife Elaine de chair. The occasion was the presentation of A£86,711 pounds raised through the Fire Brigade's Art Union, to be donated to various charities. A commemorative photo album which features the No. 1 manual being used, operated by firemen, was issued following the occasion. Copies of the album are held at the Museum of Fire, Penrith and the State Records NSW. No 1 Manual was handed over to the Museum of Fire in 1985 and is now on permanent display.

=== 1939 Dennis Big 6 Fire Engine ===
The 1939 Dennis Big 6, 650/800 Pumper (No. 132) was purchased for £3184/5/5 from Dennis Bros Pty Ltd of Guildford, England. During the war years, the NSWFB was the biggest user of Dennis Fire appliances outside of the UK. "Vehicles acquired between 1934 and 1939 were almost exclusively Dennis motors. It was usual for the appliance to arrive as a motor/chassis/pump combination, and for the body to be constructed and fitted with appropriate accoutrements by the brigade workshops, in order to suit local requirements and conditions. Between 1934 and 1939, 35 (4 cylinder) Dennis Aces were acquired for suburban stations. The other main group of Dennis fire engines were acquired in the late thirties. These were the Big 4's, with 650 gpm centrifugal pumps and a foam tank. Ten of these appliances were placed at high-risk locations. By far the largest of the Dennis appliances of this era was the Big 6.

This was a "one off" appliance, which was used at all major fires. It was initially installed at No. 1 Stn, Headquarters on 27/5/1940 as the Running Appliance. Retired firefighter, Lewis Phillips, recalls the beginnings of his career:

'After joining the permanent brigade, I was stationed at Headquarters..... My first impression of Headquarters was that it was very drab. The fire engines and all their brass work were painted khaki for camouflage purposes in case of bombing raids.... The Running Motor No. 132 was the flagship of the service, so called because it always turned out with a Senior Officer on board. Even the Deputy Chief Officer would turn out on this.'

— Lewis Phillips, retired firefighter.

On 17 November 1948, The Governor of NSW, Lieutenant-General John Northcott inaugurated the Brigade's Radio Tele-Communication System. The Big 6 was one of, (if not the), first fire appliances to be fitted with two-way radio communication. A photo of the inauguration event shows the Governor seated in the Big 6, testing the new equipment, with Deputy Chief Officer Gerald Condon standing by. On 12 May 1950, the Big 6 was moved to No. 3 Stn, The Rocks. Whilst at this location, it was, at the instigation of Sub Station Officer J. Meeve, modified by shortening the mudguards to prevent possible damage being caused by their contact with the kerbstone when arriving at and departing the station. On 12/4/1954, the Big 6 was returned to Headquarters to serve as the 2nd Call appliance until when, some time prior to 1962; it was once again repositioned - this time to No. 38 Stn, Pyrmont.

It remained at Pyrmont until 14 June 1967, when it was placed at the Training College to be utilised as a training vehicle. In his report dated 8 June 1967 to the Board, Chief Officer Lowther stated that, it is considered desirable that No. 132 Motor Engine be placed at the Training College. The reason stated was, No. 132 appliance is used for processions and other ceremonial purposes and its being at the Training College would ensure that it was in good condition and ready for use at all times." In connection with Chief Officer Lowther's comments, the Big 6 was used as a funeral vehicle as a coffin-bearer at Brigade funerals. Retired firefighter, Edward Easton, recalled that: A Dennis Big 6, the only one of its kind in the service, was installed at Headquarters. In later years, it served another role as the brigade's coffin bearer." The appliance was modified for this purpose. A wooden platform was placed beneath where the ladders are stowed and four sets of brass bars were fitted, to hold the coffin securely. These fittings were removable to allow for the appliance's other function as a training pumper.

The Big 6 was withdrawn from service in August 1974, and was presented to the Museum of Fire for storage in 1985. In 2004, it was fully restored and placed on exhibition at the Museum of Fire, Penrith.

=== 1929 Ahrens Fox PS2 Fire Engine ===
Until the late 1920s, the brigade's largest pumping appliance was the 1891 Shand Mason Steamer ("Big Ben"). On 8 March 1928, Big Ben fought its last fire at the George Hudson timber yard fire, (although it was held in reserve at Pyrmont until 1938). During 1919–20, the Board had considered purchasing an Ahrens Fox pumper, but the price was considered "excessive". As a result, John Morris and Son were approached for quotations for a Motor Fire Engine.

Following the George Hudson fire, the Board of Fire Commissioners of NSW decided in 1929, that Sydney needed a "motorised" fire engine which could, like its predecessor "Big Ben", deliver 1000 gallons of water per minute. The Board sought tenders, approaching manufacturers such as Fiat in Italy, American La France, Ahrens Fox of the US and Dennis, Leyland and Merryweather - all of England. The Ahrens Fox PS2 pumper, made in Cincinnati, Ohio, became the obvious choice, since it was the only motorised, high pressure, piston-type pump being made in the world (in contrast to the gear and turbine pumps, which were the alternative). At the time it was ordered, the model had already been in production, virtually unchanged, for at least 11 years. Retired firefighter, Lewis Phillips said that "It was the only one of its kind in Australia ... What makes the Ahrens Fox so unique is that the company in America built it with right-hand drive to suit Australian conditions. Our workshops built and fitted the body."

It was installed at Headquarters station, as No. 8 pumper, in August 1929. The Brigade Annual Report for 1929 states that:

"An Ahrens Fox Motor Fire Engine, having a pumping capacity of 1000 gallons per minute, was imported and stationed at Headquarters..."

At a cost of £3817 8s 4d, the appliance was considered an asset to the Brigade (AMSC). The NSWFB Annual Report for 1929 states: "A new Ahrens-Fox Motor with a pumping capacity of 1000 gallons per minute was installed at Headquarters and has proved its efficiency under actual fire conditions."

Over the next 33 years, it went on to justify this early enthusiasm as it successfully filled the void left by the retirement of "Big Ben". This, however, does not mean that the appliance did not have its critics. The criticism was made that the Ahrens Fox was too big for Sydney's streets and water mains. These criticisms were silenced at the Goldsbrough Mort wool store fire of 25 September 1935, when it proved to be the most valued piece of equipment in the fire service. Creating a new pumping record, it pumped continuously for days and, in the process, delivered 19,639 kilolitres (4,320,000 imp gal) of water whilst draughting from a canvass dam being fed by six hydrants. Through all this, it was only pumping at half capacity!

Being such a large vehicle, and with so much weight situated over the front wheels, the Ahrens Fox PS2 was difficult to control. Firefighter (later Deputy Chief Officer) J. E. Meeve is quoted as saying that it was: "... exceptionally heavy in the steering. Most of the weight was over the front wheels and at slow speeds you really had to wrestle with it. Once you got going, he adds, the steering improved, but then the whole appliance would start bouncing up and down... She was supposed to be capable of 90 mph, but I doubt if anyone here ever tried to prove it!" Retired firefighter, Edward Easton, said that "The Fox was a brute of a thing to drive according to those who drove it.... It was an awe inspiring sight to see it racing out of Headquarters and dash through the city." The motor could be started either electrically or manually by means of the crankhandle. Cranking the motor was a feat of strength of which, only a few were capable of performing unaided. "... only two men achieved (this) feat! - firefighter (later Chief Officer) H. Pye and a firefighter named Blackburn."

In time, the Ahrens Fox was used less for fires and more for displays and training, taking part in a public procession at Auburn on 4 March 1961 and the Parramatta Centenary Celebrations on 26 November 1961. It was last used as a pumping appliance at a fire at Rhodes on 9 July 1955.

On 17 September 1963, the Ahrens Fox was approved by the NSW Board of Fire Commissioners for handing over, in full working order, to the Museum of Applied Arts and Science on a permanent loan basis. However, after inspection of the vehicle at Glebe Fire Station in early September 1963, by Norm Harwood, the museum's then Curator of Transport, it was decided that the museum could not take delivery due to space constraints. Mr Harwood described the appliance thus:

"...It is a monstrous engine, nearly 9 metres (28 ft) in length, approximately 9 tonnes (10 short tons) in weight with the engine driven pumps mounted in front of the radiator..."

Following this, No. 8 Ahrens Fox is known to have been in storage at Liverpool Fire Station in 1967. It wasn't until 4 July 1968, that the museum finally took delivery of the fire engine. The vehicle was reclaimed in November 1979 by the Fire Brigades on formation of the Fire Service Museum and finally presented to the Museum of Fire at Penrith in 1985 for preservation. The Ahrens Fox PS2 pumper recalls an era, which has long since passed into the history of the NSW Fire Brigades.

=== 1942 Ford 21W Fire Brigade Mobile Canteen ===
In 1942, the Board of Fire Commissioners of NSW noted in their annual report:

Resulting from the activities of the members of the Women's Fire Auxiliary, a sum of A£3,323/7/4 was raised and handed to the Board for the purpose of providing mobile canteen facilities for the NSW Fire Service'.

The Woman's Fire Auxiliary was inaugurated in June 1940, enabling women to assist in the war effort. Lady Wakehurst (wife of the Governor of NSW) was a driving force in the formation of the WFA, and was subsequently elected president. The first intake of members were recruited from the WANS (Women's Australian National Service) and among other things, were put through an eight-week course in Air Raid Procedures, in which they were instructed in such matters as: incendiary bombs; fires in the home; rescue work; first aid; operating chemical fire extinguishers; operating fire alarms; station procedures; and fire station watchroom duties. Upon passing an examination, they were attached to their local fire station, where they continued to advance in their training. They were required to attend a 1-hour drill session one night per week, in addition to one night per week performing watchroom duties. Initially, they were recruited from the 30-45 year age bracket and were supplied with a dress uniform consisting of a tunic, skirt, hat, gloves, stockings, shoes, shirt, tie, and lapel badge. Their firefighting uniform consisted of a duperite helmet, overalls and two shoulder badges. The age restriction was later relaxed, and membership was eventually opened to members of the general public. Records show that the WFA had members attached to Headquarters, and District Stations, as early as 1941. At the conclusion of the war, the WFA was disbanded.

The WFA was heavily involved in fundraising activities. In July 1942, Florence E Rogers, on behalf of the WFA, applied to the Deputy Chief Officer (W.H. Beare) to hold a "dance at the Paddington Town Hall, on Friday, 18 September 1942: proceeds to be in aid of a Mobile Canteen for the Fire Brigade". Two days later, Mr Beare informed Chief Officer Richardson of the WFA's desire to raise money for a mobile canteen, and recommended, "that monies raised at all future functions be donated to this fund until the objective is reached". On 4 August, at a meeting of the WFA Advisory Committee, it was decided that the WFA should organise social functions with a view to raising A£1,000, to be presented to the Board of Fire Commissioners, for the purchase of a mobile canteen. It was also proposed that, when the mobile canteen was purchased, then members of the WFA should be included amongst the personnel that man and service it - "according to a suitable roster". The Board gave their assent to the first proposal and stated that it would consider the second proposal sympathetically, when occasion arose. Some 104 functions, including Cocktail Parties, Dances, Housie-Housie, Card Parties, Market Days and Theatre Parties were organised. An Art Union was organised, with the prizes including a refrigerator; a portable radio set; a vacuum cleaner; a "Vacola" preserving outfit; an electric iron; and an electric hot water jug. The main fundraising function, however, was a 'Queen Competition': consisting of eight contestants (one from each Fire District in the Metropolitan Area). The winner of the competition was Mrs Beryl Lester Balzer of Fisher Road, Dee Why, (who raised A£812/14/9). She was crowned at a "Golden Helmet Ball", on 23 October, at Sydney Town Hall. On 4 December 1942, fundraising for the mobile canteen concluded with the presentation of a cheque (A£3,323/7/4) to the Board during a special ceremony, at Paddington Town Hall.

Not everyone had been completely supportive of the fundraising effort, however, for back in September the Board of Fire Commissioners received a letter from the Fire Brigades Association (the firemen's union) stating:

'whilst commending the Women's Fire Auxiliary on their enthusiasm generally the members could more energetically support some more worthy objective of which they are not beneficiaries [and that] it would benefit the war effort more if the money raised was donated to a more worthy cause'.

Following the conclusion of fundraising activities for the canteen, however, the FBA felt that it should have a stake in spending the money. It forwarded a letter to the Board stating that: 'many members of the Association have worked enthusiastically with the Women's Fire Auxiliary towards raising the funds [and therefore] the Chief Secretary's Department suggests that we approach the Board with a view to co-operating in the expenditure of the funds'.

It appears that the union was under a misapprehension when the above letters were written. The minutes, of a deputation from the FBA to the Board in August 1943, indicate that there had been a lack of communication between the WFA and the FBA, as to the real purpose of the canteen. The FBA's misunderstanding was threefold: 1) that the canteen was being purchased specifically for general fire brigade use; 2) that the WFA should not have commenced collecting funds for this purpose without first consulting the FBA, for as one union member expressed - it "was making the men an object of charity; and 3) that the canteen would subsequently be run by a committee comprising the WFA.

The President of the Board (T.J. Smith) criticised the Association for their failure to contact the Board concerning the matter and explained the situation. The WFA was in fact a war emergency organisation, and as such, had sought permission to raise funds by public subscription - for the war effort. Having raised the funds, the canteen was to be presented to the NSW Fire Brigades - primarily for war emergencies. Nevertheless, it might also be used for unusual circumstances connected with general Fire Brigade activities. In other words: the canteen would be part of the fire service, but function as a war emergency unit, in order to assist firemen and anyone else. The Chief Secretary authorised the Board to act as trustees of the funds raised through the appeal, and following the canteen's installation, to administer the vehicle. This meeting achieved a better understanding and settled the matter. It should be pointed out, however, that despite the misunderstanding at official level, many firemen had minds of their own, and in fact, worked enthusiastically with the WFA in support of their fundraising efforts.

With the money in a trust account, and the union favourably disposed toward the canteen, the Board of Fire Commissioners instructed Special Officer J. Neville and Stores Officer W. Wiggins to inspect a number of mobile canteen units then being utilised by other organisations. They were to gather information "to facilitate the construction and supply of a similar unit for the NSW Fire Brigades". Of the units inspected, it was considered that the canteen, used by the WANS, offered "the best utility so far as dispersing refreshments at short notice".

In March 1943, a Special Meeting of the Women's Fire Auxiliary Advisory Committee resolved that Special Officer Neville, and Principal Mechanic N. Lucas, should obtain the necessary authority from the Board to purchase a chassis for the mobile canteen. Extensive enquiries were made regarding the wartime availability of suitable chassis, and it was decided that a 1942 Ford V-8 Model T7460 Chassis (A£490) provided all the necessary features. An order was placed with Hastings Deering Service Ltd; Mr Lucas was ready to proceed with plans for a suitable body plan; and then problems arose - wartime restrictions! As some weeks have elapsed since the order was placed, enquiries were made from Mr Dunn of the Department [Dept of Emergency Road Transport] and he intimated that all 174" wheelbase chassis have been frozen for construction of Omnibuses'.

Representations were made to the Department of Road Transport for the release of a chassis of the type required by the Board, but the Department replied that, in view of the transport position, it was impossible to accede to the Board's request. Further enquiries with Hastings Deering, however, revealed that there was an alternative: a "cab-over-engine" model truck. The Board's officers investigated the particular features of the chassis and were satisfied that it would be suitable for their purpose.

The matter was referred to the WFA Advisory Committee who responded favourable to the proposal. The Stores Supply Committee were careful to stress that the quotation submitted by Hastings Deering (A£471/18/0) was tentative only, and subject to confirmation by the Prices Commission, but nevertheless, recommended that an order be placed for the chassis. Unfortunately - more wartime difficulties! Delivery of the chassis from Hasting Deering was contingent upon delivery of a cab from the Ford Motor Company. The cabs, however, were held up at the wharves in Melbourne because wartime "priorities" prevented them from being loaded. In the meantime, the Board's Bankers were requesting advice concerning the canteen funds, then in a fixed deposit of A£3,305/8/9 and due for renewal - the Board knew that it needed to ensure that funds would be available to meet the cost of the chassis, when it finally arrived!

By 28 May 1943, the Principle Mechanic had submitted his design for the bodywork and equipment, setting out in full detail the arrangement of the various facilities and estimating the cost of construction A£700. The design was subsequently submitted to the WFA Advisory Committee, which gave its approval. After receiving tenders from several companies concerning the construction of the body, the Stores Supply Committee decided to consider carrying out the work in the Brigade workshops. Workshops Officer J. Morris therefore submitted an estimate on the basis of carrying out the body framing at the workshops, but placing the work of panelling and interior fitting with specialist firms. The Board approved this submission and after taking delivery of the chassis in October 1943, construction of the Canteen commenced.

Whilst construction was underway, the Advisory Council of the Women's Fire Auxiliary contacted the Board with suggestions concerning: the staffing of the canteen; the issue of coupons for "rationed goods" from the Rationing Commission; a cigarette licence; and enquiries concerning issues such as where the canteen would be housed. In February 1944, with the construction of the canteen due for completion the following month, the Board decided that it would control the canteen as an ordinary unit of the Service. It would be located at Headquarters Fire Station, utilising the engine space adjoining the watchroom. It was decided that separate premises for cooking, stores etc., would not be necessary, as all the stores would be under the control of the Board's officers. The canteen would be staffed by a Brigade driver, who would "take the appliance to the fire and, if necessary, assistance [would be] obtained from members of the WFA from the particular District in which the fire [was located]". The cigarette licence was not considered advisable.

Upon completion, number 1 Mobile Canteen was installed at Headquarters station on 21 July 1944, at a cost of A£1968/19/11. The unit operated for the first time at a fire at No. 7A and 7B Wharf, West Circular Quay, on 2 August 1944.

Having spent its entire service at Headquarters Fire Station (now City of Sydney), the canteen was withdrawn in April 1974. It was replaced by a new motorised canteen, No. 506, which was installed at Headquarters on 31 July 1975. Numbers 1 and 506 canteens are the only motorised canteens ever used by the NSW Fire Brigades. Number 506 was replaced by a caravan fitted out for canteen purposes. The caravan has since been superseded by a number of different approaches, in an attempt to cater for the needs of firefighting personnel.

After being withdrawn from service, the Canteen was placed under the custodianship of the Historical Fire Engines Association until 1981, when it was presented to the Museum of Fire for preservation. The Canteen still incorporates the original Brass Plaque, which states: 'This canteen was provided from funds raised by the Women's Fire Auxiliary with the co-operation of Fire Brigade and friends'

=== 1891 Shand Mason Fire Engine ===
In 1890, the City of Sydney was still relatively small. However, Superintendent Alfred Bear of the Metropolitan Fire Brigade recognised the growing potential fire risk in an expanding city area. An extract from the Brigades Eighth Annual Report for the year 1891 mentions the: - '... ever increasingly lofty blocks of buildings which, for want of a proper Building Act, continue to be erected in the metropolis..." With multi-story buildings becoming a common occurrence, a fire appliance was needed which could cope with these high rise demands.

In 1890, the Brigade ordered a steamer, affectionately known as "Big Ben", to be manufactured by Shand Mason & Co. of London. The following criteria were established: - 1) It should achieve 100psi in ten (10) minutes from a cold start; 2) It should pump 900gpm of water at a pressure of 200psi; 3) It should throw a jet of water to a vertical height of 61 metres (200 ft). At a cost of over £1400, the vehicle was completed and tested at the premises of Southwark 7 Vauxhall Westerworks Commission before Sir Saul Samuel, E.C.B, Agent-General for NSW on 1 October 1891. On 4 January 1892, Big Ben arrived in Sydney on the S.S. Port Douglas and was tested on February 19, 1892, at Man-o-War Steps, Fort Macquarie before being placed in service at Headquarters on 12 March 1892. Extracts from the Brigade's Eighth Annual Report for the year 1891 boasted that "...it stands unrivalled as the most powerful land steam engine that has yet been produced." Also, "At the tests made at the works, prior to shipment, 100 lb of steam were obtained from cold water in 9 minutes 55 seconds; and from a steam pressure of from 110 to 120 lb a 1 3/4 inch jet of water was thrown horizontally to a distance of 97 metres (318 ft). This engine... is calculated to work at a steam pressure of 100 to 125lb per square inch, but is capable of being worked much higher; it discharges 5 kilolitres (1,000 imp gal) of water per minute, and will project a 1 3/4 inch jet to a height of 61 metres (200 ft)."

On 28 February 1899, "Big Ben" took part in a spectacular demonstration with another "new" Brigade steamer (No. 25) at Town Hall, and to the cheers of the crowd, Big Ben threw water 6 metres (20 ft) above the 60-metre (198 ft) clock tower. "When the trial was finished the firemen gave the front and sides of the municipal building a much-needed wash. The trials were made under the supervision of Superintendent Webb and Deputy Superintendent Sparkes...." On the occasion, Superintendent Webb said: "... The trials of this morning show that we could throw water over the highest building in Sydney, which is the Hotel Australia, 49 metres (160 ft) high."

In 1901, Big Ben was involved in the extinguishment of one of Sydney's major fires, the "Anthony Hordern's fire", which threatened the three gasometers of AGL. One hundred and seventy fireman and ten steamers were required to extinguish this fire, which claimed the lives of five men.

By 1915, big Ben was "... now pulled by truck." In July 1919, a report from the Principal Mechanic refers to the possibility of purchasing "Front Wheel Drive Tractors for Steam Fire Engines - nos. 18 and 25 respectively". After receiving quotes from "American La France", "Wedlake - Lamson and Co" and "American and British Mfg Co." ranging from £1952 to £3090, it was decided that: "As the cost is prohibitive, it would be better to procure a motor pump, and make and rely on towing arrangements for the present."

Big Ben and No. 25 were to perform together again years later at the George Hudson Timber Yard fire on 8 March 1928. This was big Ben's last major pumping job. Both steamers operated so successfully that the Chief Officer of the day, Mr T. Nance, stated in his report "that at the recent fire at George Hudson Ltd, both of these appliances proved their worth and as regards their pumping capacity and reliability are miles ahead of any motor in the service."

The vehicle was the major fire fighting appliance of the brigade until its retirement in 1929, when it was replaced by the Ahrens Fox PS2 Pumper as the brigade's glamour vehicle. Big Ben was kept as a "stand-by" vehicle until 1934 when it was set aside for preservation. In 1962, Big Ben was restored, in both pumping capacity and appearance, by the board's workshops and was presented to the Museum of Applied Arts & Sciences, (now called the Powerhouse Museum), for display purposes. In the yard at Headquarters, on the occasion of being presented to the Museum, Big Ben was put through its paces and proved that it was still capable of pumping 5 kilolitres (1,000 imp gal) per minute, something that many of the "new" motorised pumpers could not achieve. After the display, Mr B. F. Andrews, on behalf of the board, presented Big Ben to Mr H. G. McKern, acting director of the museum. The vehicle was reclaimed by the Fire Brigades on formation of the Fire Service Museum, Alexandria and finally presented to the Museum of Fire at Penrith for preservation in 1985. In 2001, "Big Ben" took part in the Centenary of Federation Parade, which was significant due to the fact that it also took part in the original Federation Parade in 1901.

=== NSW Fire Brigades No 10 Vehicle Number Plates ===
The No. 10 number plate has been allocated to the Chief Officer of the NSW Fire Brigades since the inception of number plates by the Roads and Traffic Authority in 1910. The first vehicle allocated the plate, in 1910 was a 14 h.p. B.S.A vehicle used by the Chief Officer A. Webb (1989–1913). The plates have been uniquely issued to the Chief Officer, now Commissioner, of the Fire Brigades since 1910. The Number 10 vehicle has been photographed on numerous occasions, both formal and operational, for nearly 100 years.

=== 1909 Edward Smith Headquarters Switchboard ===
The Headquarters switchboard was built and designed by Fireman Edward Smith. Smith was born in the Shetland Islands on 16 September 1863. His personnel record indicates that he joined the Metropolitan Fire Brigade on 7 May 1891, his previous occupation having been that of "seaman". After rising through the lower ranks, Smith was promoted to the rank of Station Officer on 26 September 1902, having served at Headquarters (now City of Sydney), George Street North, George Street West and Paddington brigades.

During this era, the Metropolitan Fire Brigade pursued a policy of having its production, maintenance, and repairs, carried out "in-house" by its firemen. A feature of the Brigade's in-house approach, was the "encouragement" of firemen to spend some part of their career serving at the brigade workshops: such service was presented as an opportunity to gain an intimate working knowledge of fire appliances and equipment - and consequently, a means of furthering one's career. Superintendent Alfred Webb stated: "A member of the Brigade, who attends the Workshops, has more facilities for learning the business of a fireman than one who does not attend. He sees a number of engines taken to pieces and helps in the work, or he is capable of performing special work in connection with telephones, which is useful to the Brigade generally".

Edward Smith was one such fireman who took the opportunity that the workshops afforded and on 1 January 1905, he was appointed to the newly created position of "Principle Electrician". The creation of this new position was in line with the Board's in-house approach (they also created the position of Principal Mechanic at the same time). Smith's new duties were to be as follows:

- Have charge of the electrical department of the Brigade
- Be responsible for the proper working of the telephones, electric motors, electric light, and electric appliances and material
- Keep an account of the time occupied by the men under him
- Be responsible that the material supplied to him be used economically for the purpose for which it was issued
- Furnish requisitions for materials, stating for what purpose they are required
- Instruct men attending the Workshops for electrical work, in the care and management of telephones, fire alarms, batteries and other electrical appliances
- At fires, as far as possible, attend to the safety of the firemen from electric trolley wires, and electric light cables or wires, or any other electrical installation
- Require the electric current to be shut off from any source, or to cut any wires if necessary without waiting orders

It was during his tenure as Principle Electrician that Edward Smith received a gratuity of £25 from the Fire Brigades Board, on 8 February 1909, for his outstanding work "in connection with the designing and erection, and electrical connections, of [a] new telephone switchboard". It was then the practice of the Brigade to offer a gratuity to every member of the Brigade who "may invent an appliance, or improvement to an existing appliance, which may be adopted in the service". Not only might they receive a gratuity, but also "if approved", then their invention would "be tested without cost to the inventor".

Replacing an earlier rudimentary switchboard, the Edward Smith switchboard was installed at Headquarters Fire Station (now City of Sydney) in 1909, and remained in service for the next sixty years. Constructed of Colonial rosewood, cedar and Tasmanian blackwood, it served not only as a telephone switchboard, but also as a Relay Cabinet for Grinnell, May-Oatway and Kirkby Thermostatic fire alarms, as well as Telephone Fire Alarms. Sydney was the first city in the world to install telephone fire alarms: first installed in 1890, the alarms "were operable by keys given to the police, public bodies and nearby residents, or by breaking a small glass panel". The switchboard was also the means of responding fire engines and crews to emergency calls, by means of illuminating signs within the station, as well as operation of the electrical station bells. It still incorporates a turnout switch for a historically significant fire engine - the 1929 Ahrens Fox, which has been listed on the State Heritage Register.

The switchboard is largely the handiwork of one man: his carpentry and electrical wizardry was commended by the Fire Brigades Board, through the Chief Officer:

I am directed, by the Fire Brigades Board, to request you to convey to the Principal Electrician, Mr Edward Smith, a message of the Board's high commendation of the services which he has rendered in connection with the designing, erection, and the electrical connections of the admirable new telephone switchboard: - an installation which redounds to the credit not only of the Principal Electrician, but also to that of the Brigade'.

Smith was assisted in his work by another fireman of significance: William McNiven, who was awarded a gratuity of £5 for his "valuable assistance in bringing the work to successful completion". At the time, McNiven was a first class fireman and carpenter; however, he would progress to the position of NSWFB Clerk of Works, in 1916; and then, to Officer in Charge of Construction, in 1918. He became the Brigade's first in-house Architect in 1923, going on to design several Fire Stations for the NSWFB before his retirement in 1931. From 1923–1928, new stations and quarters were predominantly McNiven's designs.

The ornate woodcarving is the work of Smith's own hand - many believe that a five-leaf clover, carved amongst the other four-leaf clovers adorning the switchboard, was a mistake. Others, however, maintain that Smith intentionally included the clover – it was used for many years as a test of the "observational powers" of new recruits. Although withdrawn from service in 1969, the Edward Smith Switchboard remained at Headquarters as a standby facility until 1979, when it was presented to the Museum of Fire. It is now on permanent display at the museum, where it is interpreted in a simulated fire station/watchroom setting. Smith received the King's Police Medal in 1925. He retired on 16 November 1928, and died two years later, having returned to his homeland.

== Description ==
=== Fire and Rescue NSW Heritage Fleet ===
The Penrith Museum of Fire contains the Fire and Rescue NSW Heritage Fleet. The fleet consists of hand-drawn, horse-drawn and motorised fire engines, spanning almost every decade from the early 1840s till the late 1990s. It includes hose carts, pumpers, and ladders, as well as highly specialised vehicles such as a Carbon Dioxide tender, a mobile canteen, a bushfire tanker, a salvage engine and various hydraulic aerial appliances. Of the pumpers included in the Fleet, there are examples of:

- Manual pumpers (which were operated by up to twenty firemen, who manually pumped water utilising long shafts located on each side of the vehicle);
- Steam-powered pumpers; and
- Motorised pumpers.

The ladders include:

- Horse Drawn Curricle ladders (manufacture date 1898); and
- Motorised turntable ladders of various eras.

A complete list of the appliances that comprise the fleet is below:

Date	Description	Notes
Unknown	2x hand drawn hose carts	
c. 1902	Hose cart (hand-drawn)	
1841	Tilley - 13 centimetres (5 in) manual pumper (Horse-drawn)	
1893	Robertson hose reel	
1916	Garford type 64 - chain drive pumper	
1926	Garford type 15 - Hale pumper	
1929	Morris Magirus turntable ladders (1929 Dennis chassis)	
1931	Dennis 250/400 pumper	
1933	Dennis 300/400 pumper	
1938	Dennis Ace 350 pumper	
1939	Dennis Big 6 pumper	
1942	Morris Magirus turntable ladders (closed cab)	
1942	Morris Magirus turntable ladders (open cab)	
1942	GMC CCKW 6x6 bushfire tanker	
1947	Dennis F1 pumper (scout car)	
1952	Merryweather turntable ladders (AEC chassis)	
1955	Dennis F2 Rolls-Royce pumper	
1957	Morris 5FPM composite pumper	
1958	Commer R741 - forward control pumper	
1961	Ford Thames tamini pumper	
1965	Ford Thames CO2 tender	
1965	Ford Thames salvage	
1966	Bedford J1 Hearse	
1966	Bedford J1 tamini pumper	
1968	Ford D200 pumper	
1969	Dennis Jaguar D600 pumper	
1971	Dennis F44 pumper	
1971	Dennis Jaguar D600 pumper	
1972	International C1600 pumper	
1973	International 1610A pumper	
1973	Simon Snorkel (ERF chassis)	
1975	Magirus turntable ladders (International chassis)	
1979	International rescue monitor	
1983	Telesquirt (Mack chassis)	
1984	Mercedes911 water tanker	
1984	Magirus low profile turntable ladders (Iveco chassis)	
1984	Bomnardier Futura, "over-snow" vehicle	
1985	International 1819C pumper	
1998	Mercedes Bronto	

==== Condition ====
Physical condition ranges from fair to excellent. The archaeological potential is low. The integrity of the majority of the items, which comprise the Heritage Fleet, is of a high level.

=== 1898 Shand Mason Curricle Ladders ===
The 1898 Shand Mason Curricle Ladders are telescopic ladders consisting of one main length, and two sliding lengths, mounted on a horse-drawn carriage. They are hinged at the front of a hose box, which is centrally located over the axle. A contemporary fire brigade training manual described the ladders as follows: The elevating and extension gear consists of two winch handles fitted to a shaft, which operates by means of gears, a winding drum (with ratchets and pawls) fixed to the main ladder, and also a roller working in brackets attached to the shafts. It is so arranged that by inserting or withdrawing a locking bolt in the ladder the elevating and extension gear can be thrown in or out of action. A flexible steel wire rope is wound on the winding drum. It passes over the roller and is connected to the ladder through suitable sheaves. Steel angle sections with holes drilled to take a cross bar are fixed to the shafts for securing the ladder in a vertical position. The ladder can only be mounted when the rungs of each section are in opposition to one another. Two pointers are fitted to the winding drum to indicate this position. Plumbing tear, consisting of a worm and shaft gearing, is fixed to the hose box on either side to plumb the ladder when being used on uneven ground. The top ladder is detachable and can be used separately.

==== Condition ====
The physical condition of the ladders are good, with low archaeological potential. The locking bar for locking the ladder into a vertical position is no longer with the ladders and a new drum was manufactured and fitted by the Brigade Workshops in 1923. Apart from this, the integrity of the ladders is of a high degree and the ladders are in good condition. The adaptation of a crossbar (c. 1920s), which facilitated the conversion from horse-drawn ladders to truck-towed ladders, is still located with the vehicle (although it has been removed).

==== Modifications and dates ====
- Pre 1922 – Bracket and crossbar fitted to carriage shafts to enable the vehicle to be drawn by truck. This bracket is on location with the ladders but no longer affixed. The fabric of the shafts show wearing, and screws/screw holes, where these were once fitted.
- 1922 – New wires were spliced by the brigade workshop "sailor-men", due to the hoisting gear being frayed and the splicing defective.
- 1922 – There was a request that "pawls be fitted to the extension ladders as an additional means of safety". The ladders currently do not incorporate pawls and there is no evidence in the fabric that any were fitted.
- 1923 – A new drum was manufactured and fitted by the brigade workshops.
- Pre 1931 – The Rotary Gong is now located on the front of the hose box, directly under the ladder lengths, and appears in that position in a "Ladder and Drill" instruction manual (1931); however, rotary gong's were normally fitted to the underside of the driver's footrest in horse drawn engines. The fabric of the driver's footrest reveals mounting holes that correspond to the bolts of the gong, suggesting that the footrest was, in fact, the original position. This is further supported by the extreme difficulty in reaching and operating the gong in its current position, from any of the four seating positions.
- Pre 1960 – Repainted.

=== 1869 Shand Mason No. 1 Manual Fire Engine ===
The Shand Mason 7-inch Manual Fire Engine (1869) is a horse-drawn, four-wheeled carriage, with a hand Mason, manually operated pump comprising two vertical-acting pumps, driven by links from the horizontal shaft, which is connected to the handles by levers outside the frame of the engine. It incorporates a connection for a suction hose to supply the pump with water. Two deliveries (for the attachment of hose) are located below the carriage-one on either side. On the sides of the engine are pumping handles, each 18 feet 6 inches long, which combined, facilitate pumping operations by a total of twenty firefighters - ten on each side. These handles fold inwards from both ends so that their length will not cause obstruction when the vehicle is driven.

The body is of the "Braidwood" style: it accommodates a coachman seated at the front, and three firemen seated on each side (facing outwards). A hose and equipment compartment is located under the crew's seating. On either side of the vehicle brake levers are located just behind the driver: these were operated by the firemen either side of the driver

There is evidence of lantern mountings however these appear to have been removed to facilitate the installation of the brake levers which are not original. There is also evidence that a hose reel was originally mounted at the rear of the vehicle; this has been removed at some time, either during or after its service. The fabric reveals evidence that two railings, one at each end of the crew's seat, have also been removed. There is also evidence that a rotary gong was once fitted to the underneath of the driver's footrest; however, this was not originally part of the fabric and has since been removed.

On the underside of the driver's seat, which lifts to reveal a compartment, the number "1" has been incised into the wood.

==== Condition ====
As at 11 July 2012, the physical condition of the engine is good; with a low archaeological potential. The appliance is essentially the same as one featured in an 1871 photograph. The photograph reveals that the lanterns have been removed to allow for the fitting of rear wheel, lever-operated brakes. The hose reel which was mounted at the rear of the appliance is absent, as are railings, which were formerly fitted to the top of the Braidwood body. It appears as though a rotary gong fitted and later removed. The vehicle is still in a fully operational condition.

==== Modifications and dates ====
- The lanterns at the front of the appliance have been removed to allow fitting of brake levers on either side (date unknown).
- A rotary gong was fitted (after 1889) but later removed (after 1926).
- Hose reel originally mounted on the rear of the appliance has been removed (date unknown).
- Railings originally mounted at each end of the crew's seating have been removed (date unknown).
- The appliance ar some stage has been completely stripped of paint and then repainted (date unknown). It also once featured the wording "Metropolitan Fire Brigade" on the sides and now it features "NSW Fire Brigades".

==== Further information ====
It has been a long term oral tradition among firefighters, museum staff and fire engine enthusiasts that this appliance once belonged to the Royal Alfred Volunteer Company No 1 – Australia's first volunteer fire company (formed 1854). This tradition is partly based upon a number "1" incised into the underside of the driver's seat. However, this may only refer to the vehicle's Metropolitan Fire Brigade number (which appears in annual reports). Notwithstanding, a photograph and description of the volunteer company's engine closely matches the extant No 1 Manual. At this stage there is no documented connection between the two engines, however it is indeed a possibility. Research is continuing in an effort to close a three-year gap in the vehicle's provenance which hinders a conclusive connection. If such an association can be proved, then this would enhance the engine's historic significance.(The No.1 Volunteer Company's engine house (erected in 1857) has also been conserved and now operates as the Fire Station Cafe in Pitt St Haymarket).

=== 1939 Dennis Big 6 Fire Engine ===
The 1939 Dennis Big 6 (No. 132 ME) consists of a Dennis chassis (No. 3002) and an 8-litre \ 6 cylinder \ 115 bhp Meadows 6EX-A engine. The pump is a Tamini centrifugal type with capacity of 800 gpm. The body is of a Braidwood type and was constructed by the brigade workshops. The cabin is an open type, with seating for the driver and officer in charge. At the rear of the appliance, there is provision for ten (10) portable, hand-operated extinguishers, four (4) standard branches and hydrant gear. The pump is also situated at the rear of the appliance which incorporates both pressure and compound gauges. On each side of the appliance, there is a running board, suction hose (3 x lengths - total), and storage compartments for hose and equipment. More storage compartments are located under the running boards on either side. On the driver's side, there is a spare wheel adjacent to the driver, and a large branch and foam generator attached to the running board. On the officer's side, is a siren and adjustable spotlight. On the top of the appliance is a water monitor, four (4) scaling ladders and a thirty (30) foot Pretoria ladder. Brass railings are fitted down each side behind the side seating where the fire crew sits.

==== Condition ====
As at 29 July 2004, the physical condition of the appliance is excellent; with low archaeological potential. Restoration work such as rust removal and repainting, with mechanical work to bring the motor to a fully operational condition, has been carried out. The previous condition of the appliance was recorded photographically. The appliance would consist of approximately 85% original fabric.

==== Modifications and dates ====
- c. 1940 – Windscreen added.
- 18 August 1944 – Amal Mechanical fuel pump replaced by electric pump.
- 15 September 1949 – Pyrene Foam Branch canister and fittings removed and replaced by a No. 10 Pyrene Mechanical Foam Generator with necessary fittings.
- 1945 – Completely repainted.
- 11 September 1950 – Originally, the mud guards projected 5 inches below the tail board. It was suggested by report dated 29 May 1950, from 3 Station, The Rocks, that "...this projection be removed and the mudguards made to finish flush with the tailboard..." This was to prevent them being damaged by contact with the kerbstone when arriving at or leaving the station.
- Post 1950 – Mounting for Pretoria Ladder fitted.
- 18 November 1964 – Safety belts fitted.
- 2004 – Fully restored by Museum of Fire, Penrith.

=== 1929 Ahrens Fox PS2 Fire Engine ===
The Ahrens Fox PS2 pumper consists of an Ahrens Fox chassis and pump, constructed by the Ahrens Fox Co. of Cincinnati, Ohio, and a body constructed by the NSW Board of Fire Commissioners Workshops, (built along the lines followed by the American builders). The body incorporates a seating area for eight firefighters at the rear of the appliance. Situated in between the rear seating area and the driver's seat is a hose box. The vehicle is mounted on four disc wheels, fitted with pneumatic tyres (38"x 9" - rear; 36"x 8" - front). The appliance is 22 feet (6.7 m) long, 7 feet (2.1 m) high and weighs approximately 6 tons. It incorporates a six-cylinder, T-head type, petrol engine developing 140 bhp, with three spark plugs per cylinder and three separate ignition circuits. Each cylinder has a 5 7/8 inch bore and a stroke of 7 inches. The engine can be started either electrically or by manual cranking. This vehicle employs a heating system, (for defreezing in cold weather), a normal cooling system and a supplementary cooling system. The supplementary system can be activated when the operating temperature begins to exceed the radiator-absorbing capacity of the normal cooling system, (e.g. when working over a long period of time). This supplementary system employs water passing through the pump, so that the operating temperature can be regulated at will. The Fox pump operates on the same principle as the simple handle models of the 17th century; however Ahrens Fox developed the concept to a high degree of practical efficiency. With a capacity of 1.383 gallons of water and an output of 1000 gallons per minute, the pump sits astride the front wheels of the vehicle. The pump is of a twin "triple piston" type, with a 4 1/2 inches (110 mm) bore and a 6-inch (150 mm) stroke. It is a "double-acting" pump - delivering water both on the top and bottom of the stroke. It can be operated as two separate units, each of equal capacity and each being driven by an independent crankshaft. Attached to the pump is a large spherical "air dome" or chamber, which acts as a pressure equaliser, reducing pulsations in water pressure generated by a 1000gpm pumping rate, thereby ensuring a constant flow of water. Incorporated in the front of the pump are 2 x 6inch suction inlets and 4 x deliveries - two on either side.

==== Condition ====
As at 29 July 2004, the appliance is in an excellent physical condition; with low archaeological potential. There is a high degree of original fabric. The rust removal and repainting carried out in 1986 does not detract from the item's significance. It is a fully working appliance.

==== Modifications and dates ====
- 1929 – Date of manufacture.
- 1953 – Pump removed and reconditioned; appliance reduced.
- 1986 – Rust removal and repainting.

==== Further information ====
A report from the Museum of Fire (Kenneth Poulter) to the NSW Fire Brigades dated 9 September 1986 states that the appliance required: considerable repainting and rust removal. The front wheels were sand-blasted and repainted. Two areas of extensive rusting were removed from both sides of the body work. The vehicle has now been brought back to original condition. The work was completed on 4 September 1986.

=== 1942 Ford 21W Fire Brigade Mobile Canteen ===
The 1942 Ford 21W Mobile Canteen consists of a body (constructed by the NSW Fire Brigades workshops) mounted on a 1942 Ford "Cab Over Engine" chassis. The motor is a V Type, 90, 8 Cylinder, 90 hp engine (No. 3G36649F). Affixed to the passenger side external wall is a brass plaque, featuring the inscription: 'This canteen was provided from funds raised by the Women's Fire Auxiliary with the co-operation of Fire Brigade and friends'. The interior was constructed by Gough Bros (Panelling) and F.G. O'Brien (Interior construction), and comprises:

- Inside lining: Three-ply timber with cover strips at all joints.
- Upper Front: An insulated hot water tank (25 gal), which is filled from an external filler located on the roof; a small window (sliding sash); First Aid cabinet; sink with draining board.
- Lower Front: Cabinets with sliding doors.
- Upper Right: Ceiling to floor cupboard with hinged door; pie oven (capacity 200 pies) heated using methane gas cylinder supply; portable fire extinguisher.
- Lower: Cupboards with sliding doors.
- Upper Left: Cupboard with sliding glass doors; cupboard with hinged door; two canopy flaps.
- Lower Left: Two counter flaps; one bench extending the full length of the canteen area; cupboards under bench with sliding doors containing racks for 400 drinking mugs; three drawers for cutlery and plates.
- Rear: Entry door
- Under floor area: Lockers built under floor level to carry spare wheel; tools; hose; etc.

==== Condition ====
The condition of the canteen is fair; with a low archaeological potential. A high degree of original fabric.

==== Modifications and dates ====
Three 45-litre (10 imp gal) insulated coffee/tea urns with taps and drip tray, and a 18-litre (4 imp gal) milk urn with tap, have been removed (date unknown). These were located on the upper right interior. Although the canteen was not completed and placed into service until 1944, it is dated by the manufacture date of its chassis (1942).

=== 1891 Shand Mason Fire Engine ===
The steam pump is set upon a four-wheeled carriage, pulled by two to four horses. The carriage is 4,600 millimetres (180 in) long x 3,250 millimetres (128 in) high including the steamer's chimney. On top at the front of the carriage is the driver's seat. Attached to the underside of the driver's footrest is a foot-operated alarm bell. Behind the driver's seat is a storage box with a seating lid for six men - three on either side; the front man on either side being the brake operator. At the rear and immediately behind the storage box, is the coal fired steam pump, fixed to the carriage. It features an inclined water tube boiler, and an equilibrium type steam engine, fitted with three steam cylinders, three double acting pumps, has a suction of 7 1/2 inches and five deliveries, four of the latter are for 2 3/4 inch hose, and one for 3 1/2 inch hose. The boiler assembly incorporates a water pressure gauge, steam pressure gauge and water level gauge. Two air chambers have been included to eliminate water pulsation caused by the action of the pistons. At the rear of the appliance are a water reservoir and a coal box situated to the right and left of the pump respectively. Connected to the front wheel axle is a large coal box. The vehicle weighs five tonnes (five short tons), the bulk of the weight being supported by the rear axle.

==== Condition ====
As at 29 July 2004, the physical condition of the appliance was excellent; with low archaeological potential. There is a high degree of original fabric. The running gear is in excellent condition. The pump is operational. However, the steam boiler is no longer operational.

==== Modifications and dates ====
- 1891 – Date of manufacture.
- 1906 – New boiler manufactured in Sydney by Clyde Engineering to original specifications.
- 1920 – The boiler was dropped and inspected. It was found necessary to fit 22 tubes to replace those fractured by improper use.
- c. 1961 – Fire Magazine records that restoration work was carried out by the Board workshops prior to handing the appliance over to the Museum of Applied Arts and Science in 1962. However, no details are included except the statement that: "Big Ben was restored to its former glory, in pumping capacity and glittering appearance, by the Board's Workshops, under the supervision of Mr Jack Campbell..." -

==== Further information ====
The Shand Mason Steamer was, at the time, the largest capacity land based steamer in Australia. It could generate a pump pressure of 1,550 kilopascals (225 psi) with a steam pressure of 800 kilopascals (120 psi) and could throw a jet of water to a vertical height of 58 metres (190 ft). It could raise 700 kilopascals (100 psi) steam pressure from cold in less than ten minutes.

=== NSW Fire Brigades No 10 Vehicle Number Plates ===
The collection includes an original plate of vitreous enamel and the current set of plates of embossed steel.

==== Condition ====
As at 11 April 2001, the number plates were in excellent condition. The plates are intact and in excellent condition. At least one vehicle associated with the plates, the 1929–1957 Super 8 Hudson was disposed of. Further research into other associated motor cars is required.

==== Modifications and dates ====
The number plates were issued by the registering authority. In 1910 this was the Traffic Superintendent's Office of the NSW Police Department, in 1930 by the Department of Road Transport and Tramways and in 1952 by the Department of Motor Transport, and again in early 1989 by the Roads and Traffic Authority.

==== Further information ====
The number plates were issued by the registering authority. In 1910 this was the Traffic Superintendent's Office of the NSW Police Department, in 1930 by the Department of Road Transport and Tramways and in 1952 by the Department of Motor Transport, and again in early 1989 by the Roads and Traffic Authority. The Number 10 vehicle number plates are well known to all generations of firefighters not only in NSW but in Australia.

=== 1909 Edward Smith Headquarters Switchboard ===
The Edward Smith Switchboard is constructed from Colonial rosewood, cedar and Tasmanian blackwood. Hand carved by its designer, Edward Smith, the switchboard is aesthetically pleasing. It incorporates switches for the purpose of responding fire engines and their crews to calls, as well as panels of electrical shutters for the reception of automated fire alarms, telephone fire alarms, and telephone calls. Located toward the centre of the switchboard are two lamps, whilst two clocks are located to the far right and left. Amongst the hand-carved four leaf clovers is one "five-leaf" clover.

==== Condition ====
The physical condition of the switchboard is excellent; with low archaeological potential. It is evident from early photographs of the switchboard that, throughout its sixty years of service, there has been some modification to the alarm panels and circuitry. However, this introduced fabric is a relatively minor addition to the original, and is an important part of the switchboard's story within the context of the historical process of equipment development. As such, this introduced fabric should not be considered to be an intrusive accretion; rather, it enhances the significance of the switchboard.

==== Modifications and dates ====
Some modification to the alarm panels and circuitry. Dates unknown, but have probably taken place over an extended period of its lifespan.

== Heritage listing ==
Fire and Rescue NSW Heritage Fleet

As at 14 March 2013, the Fire and Rescue NSW Heritage Fleet demonstrates the progressive development of fire brigade technology for the purpose of meeting new demands and challenges, contingent upon a growing and developing City of Sydney. The development of firefighting technology is an ongoing process that continues today, and these vehicles comprise an important aspect of that historical process. The Heritage Fleet spans an era that ranges from 1841 to the late 1990s. Some of the vehicles provide evidence of great innovation; others constitute a new direction such as the "Scout Car" (the brigade's first attempt to design a fire engine in which the firemen could travel inside the vehicle). Many are aesthetically pleasing by virtue of their size and fabric. This collection is held in high esteem by both fire engine enthusiasts, and retired firefighters. This is evidenced by the care and maintenance carried out by volunteer workers at the Museum of Fire, as well as the numerous articles that have appeared in various publications, concerning these vehicles. Further evidence of their social significance lies in the requests that are received for the involvement of some of these vehicles in parades, processions and exhibitions. Providing evidence of both defunct and more recent technologies, the Heritage Fleet is a rich source for research into the development of fire fighting appliances over some one hundred and fifty years. As a collection, the Fire & Rescue Heritage Fleet is rare in terms of its high representativeness, and its comprehensiveness. Some of the vehicles that comprise the collection are rare items in their own right.

1898 Shand Mason Curricle Ladders

As at 16 July 2012, the 1898 Shand Mason Curricle Ladders demonstrate the continuing process of improving and upgrading firefighting equipment and techniques in NSW, in response to the increasing and new demands of a developing and expanding City of Sydney. These ladders demonstrate rarity, as they were the first of only two sets of Curricle Ladders to be imported by the Metropolitan Fire Brigade (the remainder being locally produced). They are a fine example of the work of the Shand Mason Company of London, and are representative of their class in principles of elevation and extension; however, they are unique in terms of being the only set curricle ladders used by the brigade, to incorporate a wooden box-like framework to increase the ladder's weight bearing capacity. They are also the only set of Shand Mason Curricle Ladders imported by the Metropolitan Fire Brigade, as well as the only fifty-foot set of Curricle Ladders used by the brigade (the remainder being forty-five feet). Investigation suggests that these are the only extant Curricle Ladders used by the Metropolitan, and NSW Fire Brigades. They have a historical association with one of Sydney's major early fires (the Anthony Hordern & Sons fire of 1901), which had a devastating impact upon the Sydney community. The integrity and condition of the ladders are good. Firefighters and fire engine enthusiasts hold the ladders in high esteem, and this is evidenced by the ongoing care and maintenance carried out by volunteers at the Museum of Fire, Penrith. Social significance is also demonstrated by the decision of the Board of Fire Commissioners to dedicate the ladders for preservation.

1869 Shand Mason 7 inch manual fire engine

As at 10 July 2012, The Shand Mason 7 inch manual fire engine (1869), manufactured by the Shand Mason Company of London, demonstrates an early stage in the process of a progressive development and improvement of fire brigade pumping appliances. It is associated with an era that both preceded and followed statutory control of fire protection in NSW, under both pre-Federation and post-Federation government policies. It demonstrates a defunct firefighting technology: manually powered pumping engines. With its Braidwood style body, side pumping handles, and its typical layout and design, it is a fine example of a mid-nineteenth century, state-of the-art horse-drawn fire engine. In general design it is typical not only of the Shand Mason Company but also of their competitors: "Tilley" and "Merrywether". Research suggests it is one of only five manual fire engines extant in Australia and this, when taking into consideration its integrity and good condition, qualifies it as a rare item. This engine demonstrates social significance through the volunteer conservation of fire fighters and enthusiasts. Social significance was also demonstrated when the engine was set aside for museum purposes, by the Board of Fire Commissioners of NSW.

1939 Dennis Big 6 Fire Engine

As at 19 October 2005, The 1939 Dennis Big 6 (No. 132 ME) is a fine example of the Dennis Motor appliances of the 1930s and 1940s. Its rarity as the largest and most powerful of the Dennis appliances, as well as being the only specimen of its type brought to, and used in, NSW, makes it an outstanding and unique specimen. Although it has undergone some restoration, a photographic record has been kept of its original condition. It is held in high esteem by fire engine enthusiasts because it was regarded as the flagship of the service during its time as Headquarters Runner. This regard was evidenced by the fact that it was always boarded by a senior officer, up to and including the Deputy Chief Officer. It is also held in esteem because it was utilised as the Brigade Coffin Bearer at brigade funerals, as well as for processions and ceremonial purposes. The esteem in which it is held is evidence by the maintenance work carried out by fire engine enthusiasts and volunteers at the Museum of Fire, Penrith, where it is now on exhibition. The Big 6 demonstrates, and is an important part of, the progressive development of the NSW Fire Brigades' firefighting techniques, technologies, equipment and control - in particular, the development of its pumping appliances. It demonstrates the Brigade's endeavours to cope with new demands and challenges brought about by a growing and developing City of Sydney. During its history, it has only ever been owned by the NSW Fire Brigades.

1929 Ahrens Fox PS2 Fire Engine

As at 26 October 2004, purchased as a replacement for the No. 18 Shand Mason Steamer in 1929, the NSW Board of Fire Commissioners recognised the need for a motorised pumper of the same 1000 gpm capacity. Thus, the appliance demonstrates the progressive development of Fire Brigade appliances, in order to meet the ever increasing demands of a developing City of Sydney. It is a surviving example of the NSW Fire Brigades' endeavours to deliver adequate fire protection during the early 20th century. Aesthetically, this fire appliance demonstrates technical excellence and was a great leap forward from anything else the Brigade owned. In its time, it was a sophisticated product of American technical ingenuity. With such features as a secondary cooling system, a pump which can be operated as two separate units, pneumatic tyres and four wheel brakes, it was unique among NSW Fire Brigades appliances. The pump with its mass of chrome is, in both design and execution, aesthetically pleasing. This appliances integrity as a fully working appliance with a high degree of original fabric, contributes to its significance in terms of both rarity and representativeness. This appliance is unique as the only one of its type to be imported into Australia. It is an exceptionally fine example of its type, being typical of the workmanship and technology of the Ahrens Fox Company of the early 20th century. It should be considered an outstanding specimen in terms of its capacity and size, and because of the esteem in which firefighting enthusiasts hold this appliance. This esteem also adds to its significance in social terms. This vehicle has always been regarded as the glamour vehicle of the NSW Fire Brigades.

1942 Ford 21W Mobile Canteen

As at 12 November 2014, the 1942 Ford 21W Mobile Canteen is historically significant, for it demonstrates the process of the development of firefighting resources and equipment. This development is an ongoing process and is a response to the constantly evolving and increasing challenges faced by the Fire Brigade in its endeavour to provide adequate fire protection to the community. This vehicle is an example of the development of operational support appliances, which are vital for the efficient management and support of firefighting personnel, at major emergency incidents. The mobile canteen has a historical association with the Second World War, which provides both the context and the catalyst for its provision. In particular, it is associated with the now-defunct Women's Fire Auxiliary, which was formed as a wartime initiative in response to a diminished male workforce, due to military service – being a wartime expediency, however, the WFA was disbanded at the conclusion of the war. The mobile canteen is also associated with the contribution of women to the war effort, from the home front. Firstly, by relieving permanent (male) firefighters from many of the non-firefighting roles, whenever an emergency incident occurred. Secondly, through their many fundraising activities. Such fundraising facilitated the construction and donation of this canteen as a war emergency unit. This canteen is socially significant. The firefighting community, as well as fire engine enthusiasts, hold this vehicle in high esteem. This is demonstrated by the maintenance and conservation work carried out by volunteers and enthusiasts. It is also demonstrated by the decision of the Board of Fire Commissioners to hand the vehicle over for preservation and display purposes. The canteen is a rare item, for it is one of the only two (NSW Fire Brigades) motorised mobile canteens that were purpose built and utilised for operational support. Moreover, Its design was based upon the World War II mobile canteens that were operated by the Women's Australian National Service (WANS). Research has been unable to establish the survival of any of the canteens operated by the WANS, and therefore, this vehicle is perhaps the only extant example of a World War II mobile canteen. The high integrity of the vehicle's fabric enhances its rarity. The Ford Mobile Canteen is an outstanding representative of its class - mobile canteens utilised in Sydney (and elsewhere) during the war years. The high integrity of its fabric enhances its representativeness.

1891 Shand Mason Fire Engine

As at 26 October 2004, the 1891 Shand Mason Steamer is a fine example of 19th century, horse-drawn, steam-powered technology, innovation and workmanship. Although it has much in common with other steamers, and is therefore representative of its type, it stands alone with regard to its power and capacity. In addition to its outstanding size, the fact that it is the only one of its type ever to be used in NSW (and Australia), qualifies it to be regarded as a rare item. Affectionately known as "Big Ben", the appliance is held in high esteem by Fire Engine enthusiasts and this is evidenced by the care and maintenance carried out by volunteer workers at the Museum of Fire where it is now located. This steamer has a continuity of association with an important event of national significance - Federation. It has participated in both the Federation Parade of 1901, as well as the Centenary of Federation Parade in 2001. From the date of its purchase and importation from the London, England manufacturers, the 1891 Shand Mason Steamer has been the property of the NSW Fire Brigades (formerly Metropolitan Brigade).

NSW Fire Brigades No 10 Vehicle Number Plates

As at 2 October 2001, the Number 10 vehicle number plates are valued for their historical and social significance. One of the earliest recipients of the first number plates issued by the Roads and Traffic Authority, the number 10 plates have since 1910, been affixed to the vehicle of the Chief Commissioner of the NSW Fire Brigades. The nomination includes the original "No. 10" vitreous enamel plate issued by the RTA in 1910 (a single plate was affixed to the rear of the vehicle in 1910) and the replacement set of "No. 10" embossed steel plates issued in 1937 (by the 1920s two "plates" were being used. The plates have been in continuous use by the NSW FB since 1910. The numeric plates No. 10 are the only NSW number plates to remain in issue to the same organisation since number plates were first introduced in NSW. The Number 10 vehicle number plates are held in great esteem by the NSW Fire Brigades and firefighters in New South Wales, for their symbolic association with the Commissioner and the traditions of the Fire Brigades.

1909 Edward Smith Headquarters Switchboard

As at 18 March 2013, the Edward Smith switchboard demonstrates the continual and progressive process of the improvement and development of Fire Brigade firefighting techniques, equipment, and control, in order to cope with new demands and challenges consequent upon a growing and developing City of Sydney. With the growth of the city, came the need for a better co-ordinated and more efficient means of communication: both in terms of communicating a call of fire to the Brigade through automatic and telephone fire alarm systems, as well as in terms of communication between Fire Stations, by telephone. The Edward Smith switchboard was the Metropolitan Fire Brigade's response to such needs. The switchboard demonstrates the multi-skills of early twentieth century firemen. Brigade management believed that time spent in the brigade's workshops would not only benefit the brigade, but would also be advantageous to a fireman's career, for he would attain a more comprehensive knowledge of fire appliances, and increase his skills. Thus, he would be more useful to the Brigade and his career would advance accordingly. Edward Smith was one of those firemen who took advantage of the opportunity to increase his skills in the workshops, and his switchboard is a demonstration of his multi-skilled expertise. The switchboard also demonstrates the late nineteenth and early twentieth century practice of the Metropolitan Fire Brigade to operate under an "in-house" system, whereby the brigade was largely reliant upon its firemen to supply such needs such as uniforms, motor mechanical work, plumbing, carpentry, farriery, painting and electrical work. Highly esteemed by fire brigade enthusiasts, the switchboard is representative in terms of the skills of the brigade workshops; but both unique and outstanding in terms of its size, complexity and its being the work of a "designer/builder". Other brigade switchboards of the time were of a standard and rudimentary design, and constructed by general workshop staff. Although some modifications have taken place during its history, those modifications are an important aspect of the switchboard's story and cannot be considered to be intrusive accretions; thus, they do not diminish, but rather they enhance the switchboard's significance.

=== Heritage criteria ===
The Fire and Rescue NSW Heritage Fleet, the 1898 Shand Mason Curricle Ladders, the 1869 Shand Mason 7 inch Manual Fire Engine, the 1942 Ford 21W Fire Brigade Mobile Canteen, and the 1909 Edward Smith Headquarters Switchboard were listed on the New South Wales State Heritage Register on 25 February 2013; and the 1939 Dennis Big 6 Fire Engine, the 1929 Ahrens Fox PS2 Fire Engine, and the 1891 Shand Mason Fire Engine were listed on the New South Wales State Heritage Register on 3 December 2004, having satisfied the following criteria.

The place is important in demonstrating the course, or pattern, of cultural or natural history in New South Wales.

The NSW Fire Brigades Heritage Fleet demonstrates the progressive development of Fire Brigade pumping appliances and vehicles in order to cope with new demands and challenges brought about by a growing and developing city of Sydney. The development of firefighting technology is an ongoing process, which continues today, and these engines comprise an important aspect in that historical process. They are surviving examples of the Fire Brigade's endeavours to deliver adequate fire protection in the nineteenth and twentieth centuries.

When the Metropolitan Brigade took control in 1884, they possessed "one American ladder truck". With the arrival of the No. 4 Curricle Ladders in 1898, the brigade plant consisted of 2 large ladders and 4 small ladders. The 1898 Shand Mason Curricle Ladders demonstrate the ongoing process of the improvement and development of firefighting capabilities and equipment, during the late nineteenth, and early twentieth centuries, in response to the increasing demands of an expanding and developing City of Sydney.

The Shand Mason 7 inch Manual (1869) is likely to be of State heritage significance as it demonstrates a stage of the progressive development of fire brigade pumping appliances and equipment throughout the era which both preceded and followed statutory control of fire protection in NSW under both the pre and post Federation Government.

The 1940 Dennis Big 6 (No. 132 ME) demonstrates the progressive development of the Brigade's firefighting techniques, technologies, equipment and control – in particular, pumping appliances. This development is an ongoing attempt to cope with new demands and challenges brought about by a growing and developing City of Sydney. The appliance is part of this process and demonstrates the Fire Brigade's endeavours to deliver adequate fire protection in the mid 20th Century.

The Ahrens Fox Ps2 demonstrates the progressive development of the Fire Brigade's pumping appliances and equipment in order to cope with new demands and challenges brought about by a growing and developing city of Sydney. The development of firefighting technology is an ongoing process which continues today and this appliance is an important part of that historical process. It is a surviving example of the Fire Brigade's endeavours to deliver adequate fire protection in the early 20th century.

The Canteen demonstrates the process of the development of firefighting equipment, control and techniques. This vehicle is an example of the development of operational support appliances, which are necessary for efficient firefighting operations. This development is an ongoing process and a response to the constantly evolving and increasing challenges faced by the Fire Brigade, in its efforts to provide adequate fire protection to the community.

The 1891 Shand Mason Steamer demonstrates the progressive development of the Brigade's pumping appliances and equipment in order to cope with new demands and challenges brought about by a growing and developing City of Sydney. The development of fire fighting technology is an ongoing process which continues today and this appliance is an important part of that process. The appliance is associated with the development and growth of Sydney: its design and production was a direct response to the Brigade's concern over what it perceived to be a "reckless" increase in high rise buildings without a proper concern for fire safety precautions and without an adequate "Building Act".

The Edward Smith Switchboard demonstrates the progressive process of improving the Brigade's firefighting techniques, equipment, and control in order to cope with the new demands and challenges of a growing and developing City of Sydney. The development of firefighting support technology is an ongoing process that continues today, and this switchboard, which served the city of Sydney for sixty years, has been an important part of that process. Its capacity to perform a multi-functional purpose was a significant advancement in Fire Brigade communications. The switchboard also demonstrates a now defunct phase: the Fire Brigade's comprehensive "in-house" approach to manufacture, maintenance and supply. It demonstrates the multi-skilled nature of nineteenth century, and early twentieth century, firefighting personnel, through their utilisation in the Brigade's workshops, where they carried out such duties as: manufacture of uniforms; motor mechanical work; plumbing; carpentry; farriery; and electrical work.

The place has a strong or special association with a person, or group of persons, of importance of cultural or natural history of New South Wales's history.

A number of the appliances, which comprise the Heritage Fleet, have associations with important events and groups during the history of the State of NSW. These associations include: the George Hudson timber yard fire of 1928; and the Goldsbrough Mort wool store fire of 1935.

The Curricle Ladders have an association with one of Sydney's most devastating fires of the early twentieth century - the Anthony Hordern & Sons fire in Haymarket, on 10 July 1901.

This appliance is associated with the Goldsbrough Mort Wool Store fire of 25/9/1935. It pumped for 27 hours non-stop as this fire, regarded to be one of Sydney's largest and worst, caused damages of £800,000 and injured nine people including firefighters. Twenty-eight officers and 129 firefighters were required to extinguish this fire.

The 1942 Ford Mobile Canteen is associated with the Second World War, which provides both the context and the catalyst for its construction and service. In particular, it is associated with the now-defunct Women's Fire Auxiliary, which was formed for wartime service at a time when the male workforce was diminished, and which was disbanded soon after the conclusion of the war. This auxiliary group provided a significant avenue for women to contribute to the war effort. Firstly, by allowing permanent (male) firefighters to be released from many of the non-firefighting roles, during emergency incidents; secondly, through their fundraising efforts, which facilitated the donation of this canteen as a war emergency unit. It has an association with, and is an extant example of, the ways in which women contributed to the war effort, on the home

The appliance has a strong associative link with the state's celebrations of Federation. It took part in both the 1901 Federation Parade and the 2001 Centenary Federation Parade.

The Edward Smith switchboard has an association with William McNiven during the early part of his career. McNiven was a first class fireman and carpenter at the time; however, he progressed to become the Brigade's first in-house architect. From 1923 to 1928, almost all new fire stations and quarters were his designs.

The place is important in demonstrating aesthetic characteristics and/or a high degree of creative or technical achievement in New South Wales.

The Heritage Fleet demonstrates the development of state of the art firefighting technology over a long period, spanning from 1841 to the late 1990s. It provides evidence of great innovation and some of the appliances demonstrate a great leap forward from anything the Brigade had previously utilised. An example of this is the 1949 Dennis F1 "Scout Car" was the first attempt, by the NSW Fire Brigades, to establish a new standard of body design, incorporating the "safer", internal seating for the crew.

The Curricle Ladders are a fine example of the work of the Shand Mason Company of London, from whom many of the state's fire appliances were ordered.

The fabric, design and layout of the appliance provide a fine example of state-of-the-art fire fighting technology of the mid-nineteenth century, in particular manually powered pumping engines. It is typical of the workmanship and technology of the Shand Mason Company during this era.

This fire appliance demonstrates technical excellence and was a great leap forward from anything else the Brigade had owned. It was unique among NSWFB vehicles because it incorporates a second cooling system designed to enable pumping for long periods, which allows the operating temperature to be regulated at will. Additionally, it was unique because the pump can be operated as two separate units each of equal capacity, each being driven by an independent crankshaft. It was the only motorised high pressure, piston-type pump being made at that time anywhere in the world. The large spherical air dome was distinctive of the Ahrens Fox design. The pump is a mass of chrome and is, in both design and execution, aesthetically pleasing. In its time, it was a sophisticated product of American Technical ingenuity.

The fabric, design and layout of the appliance provide evidence of state-of-the-art fire fighting technology of the late nineteenth century. It was innovative because Shand Mason & Co had to overcome technical difficulties associated with the production of so powerful an engine on a new pattern.

The plates are associated with the Chief Commissioner of the NSW Fire Brigades, a very senior public servant of the State. The Fire Brigades was a leading innovator in modern vehicles machinery in the early days (from 1884). The plates demonstrates early and continuous association with road vehicles. Vitreous enamel plates were issued 1910-1937 and pressed from 1937 to the present. The fact that the Chief Officers plates, No. 10, have been allocated since 1910 continuously, is unique in NSW and possibly Australia.

The switchboard demonstrates the technical innovation of Brigade Principal Electrician, Edward Smith, as designer, carpenter and electrician. He designed and constructed the switchboard according to the specific needs of the Metropolitan Brigade, in 1909. The switchboard was not limited to the reception of telephone calls; but rather, it was also a terminal for monitoring automatic fire alarms, and telephone fire alarms. Moreover, it was used to electrically respond the Headquarters fire crews to emergency calls. With this capacity to perform such a multi-functional purpose, it was a significant departure from the rudimentary switchboards, which preceded it. Constructed from Colonial rosewood, cedar and Tasmanian blackwood, and ornately hand carved, it is, in appearance, aesthetically pleasing and impressive.

The place has a strong or special association with a particular community or cultural group in New South Wales for social, cultural or spiritual reasons.

This collection is held in high esteem by Fire Engine enthusiasts and retired firefighters. This is evidenced by the care and maintenance carried out by volunteer workers at the Museum of Fire where it is now located. The social significance of many of these vehicles was recognised by the Board Of Fire Commissioners of NSW, when they gave approval for their retention for "museum purposes". The high regard in which these vehicles are held, is also evidenced by the numerous articles, which have appeared in various publications, both within and outside Fire & Rescue NSW. Further evidence of their social significance lies in the occasional participation of some of these vehicles for parades, processions and exhibitions.

The Ladders are held in esteem by firefighters and fire engine enthusiasts, and this is evidenced by its preservation and ongoing care and maintenance work carried out by volunteers at the Museum of Fire, Penrith. Social significance is also demonstrated by the decision of the Board of Fire Commissioners to dedicate the ladders for preservation.

The engine is held in high esteem by fire fighters and fire enthusiasts because of its association with an early era of the fire brigade story. This is evidenced by the care and maintenance carried out by volunteer workers at the Museum of Fire where it is now permanently on display. Its social significance was recognised by the Board of Fire Commissioners of NSW when it approved the retention of the manual for museum purposes. It is also valued because of a long term oral tradition among fire fighters and enthusiasts, that this appliance belonged to Australia's first volunteer fire company, the Royal Alfred Australia Volunteer Company No. 1.

The Big 6 was considered to be the flagship of the service. This was demonstrated by the fact that it always turned out with a senior officer on board. It was used for processions and ceremonial purposes. The esteem in which it was held then, continues today, among firefighters and fire engine enthusiasts. This is evidenced by the regular maintenance work carried out by volunteers at the Museum of Fire, Penrith where the appliance is now on display. It is also held in esteem because of its association with Fire Brigade funerals in the capacity of Coffin Bearer.

The Ahrens Fox PS2 is held in high esteem by Fire Engine enthusiasts and this is evidenced by the care and maintenance carried out by volunteer workers at the Museum of Fire where it is now located for display, as well as the articles which have appeared in various publications both from within, and independently of, the NSWFB. Over the years, this appliance has been displayed with pride through its participation in various parades and processions. The Board of Fire Commissioners of NSW recognised its social significance when it presented the Ahrens Fox to the Museum of Applied Arts and Science for posterity.

This canteen is socially significant, for the firefighting community and fire engine enthusiasts hold it in high esteem. This is demonstrated by the volunteer work carried out in conserving and maintaining this appliance. It is also demonstrated through the decision of the Board of Fire Commissioners to hand the vehicle over for preservation.

Affectionately known as "Big Ben", the appliance is held in high esteem by Fire Engine enthusiasts and this is evidenced by the care and maintenance carried out by volunteer workers at the Museum of Fire where it is now located. The social significance was recognised by the Board Of Fire Commissioners of NSW when, in 1932 they approved the retention of Big Ben for "museum purposes", but at the same time, sold No. 25 steamer for £100.

The No. 10 Vehicle Number plates are held in high regard by the NSW Fire Brigades as part of their working tradition.

Fire Brigade enthusiasts hold the switchboard in high esteem. This is evidenced by, the maintenance carried out by retired firefighters and volunteers, as well as its preservation, display, and interpretation in a simulated watchroom setting at the Museum of Fire, Penrith.

The place has potential to yield information that will contribute to an understanding of the cultural or natural history of New South Wales.

The Heritage Fleet is a rich source for research into the development and technology of firefighting equipment and vehicles generally from the 1840s until the late 1990s. It also provides fine examples of the work and ingenuity of the Board's workshop tradesmen. The collection provides opportunities for research into the many, now defunct, designs of firefighting equipment. Examples of this are:

- Horse-drawn fire appliances
- Manually pumped appliances
- Steam powered appliances
- Curricle Ladders

There are also opportunities for research into:

- Motorised appliances from 1916 till 1998.

The place possesses uncommon, rare or endangered aspects of the cultural or natural history of New South Wales.

As a collection, the Fire & Rescue NSW Heritage Fleet is rare in terms of its representativeness and comprehensiveness covering a large period of time, as well as its size. It comprises approximately two-thirds of the collection at the Museum of Fire, Penrith. Individual items within the collection are rare items in their own right. For example, the horse-drawn, manual pumpers are two of only five extant in Australia. The 1939 carbon dioxide tender is one of only five designed and used by the NSW Fire Brigades, who were the only brigade in Australia to use such appliances. Many appliances were the only example of their type to be used by the NSW Fire Brigades, and in some cases, Australia The high degree of integrity of many of these appliances also enhances their rarity.

The ladders were the first of only two "imported" curricle ladders purchased by the Metropolitan Brigade - the remainder all being locally manufactured. It was the only set of Shand Mason Curricle Ladders purchased by the Brigade, and the only set of 50-foot Curricle Ladders used (the remainder all being 45 feet). Research suggests that these are the only extant Curricle Ladders used by the Metropolitan, and NSW Fire Brigades.

The No. 1 Manual demonstrated a now defunct technology of manually powered pumping appliances and research indicates that it is one of only five extant manual fire engines in Australia. These are located at Ballarat (1), Melbourne (1), and Museum of Fire Penrith (2). These facts when considered with its integrity and good condition, qualifies it as rare.

This appliance is the only one of its type brought to Australia. Its history of service with the NSW Fire Brigades is well documented. It was the largest and most powerful Dennis fire engine purchased by the Brigade during the "Dennis era" of the 1930s and early 1940s when vehicles acquired by the brigade were almost exclusively Dennis appliances.

No. 8 Ahrens Fox PS2 is the only one of these appliances to be imported into Australia and, at the time, it was the only motorised, high-pressure, piston-type, firefighting pump being made in the world. It was unique among NSWFB vehicles through its use of a secondary cooling system and the fact that the pump could be operated as two separate units. Its integrity, being a fully working appliance, is of a high standard.

The canteen is one of only two NSW Fire Brigades, motorised mobile canteens, purpose-built for firefighting operational support. Built and used for this specific purpose, by the NSW Fire Brigades for some thirty years, its design is based upon that of the WANS mobile canteens of the Second World War. Research has been unable to establish the survival of any of the canteens used by the WANS, and therefore, this vehicle is perhaps the only extant example of a mobile canteen of that class. This qualifies the Ford Canteen as a rare item. The high integrity of the vehicle's fabric enhances its rarity.

This appliance demonstrates the now-defunct technology of steam-powered pumping appliances. Today, It is the only example of the largest steam-powered pumping appliance ever used in NSW and probably, Australia. Its integrity is of a high standard.

There has only ever been one issue of the "Number 10" number plate from the Roads and Traffic Authority.

The switchboard is a unique item. It was the only switchboard of its size and complexity to be constructed. It was designed and erected according to the brigade's specific requirements at the time, by Edward Smith: Principle Electrician of the Metropolitan Fire Brigade from 1905 till 1928. Other contemporary switchboards, built by the Brigade workshops, were of a much more rudimentary nature.

The place is important in demonstrating the principal characteristics of a class of cultural or natural places/environments in New South Wales.

The representativeness of the Heritage Fleet as a collection is outstanding due to the high integrity of the majority of the items of which it is comprised. It provides excellent examples of different types of firefighting technology from various eras, and various manufacturers. They represent almost every decade from the 1840s till the late 1990s. Some of these technologies are now defunct. Its outstanding representativeness adds to the collection's rarity.

The ladders are a fine representation of the now defunct technology of Curricle Ladders. They are representative of Curricle Ladders in principles of elevation and extension; however, they are unique in one respect: whilst other ladders incorporated metal bowed trussing to increase the ladder's weight bearing capacity, these Shand Mason ladders incorporated a wooden box-like framework to perform the same function.

The appliance is a fine example of a horse-drawn manual fire engine of the mid-nineteenth century and is typical of the designs of such English companies such as Shand Mason, Tilley and Merryweather. In line with other vehicles of its class, it is typical in its layout: rear-mounted pump, side pumping handles and a Braidwood style body. Within its class, the manual demonstrates the progression from the earlier' end-stoke' models to the "side pumper" models, which provided greater access to the pumping handles, and which in turn facilitated a greater number of firemen taking part in the pumping operations.

The Dennis Big 6 is representative of the Dennis class of fire engines being produced and used by the NSWFB during the war years of the late thirties and early forties.

Its integrity as a fully working appliance makes this a specimen of an Ahrens Fox PS2 pumper, which was typical of the workmanship and technology of the Ahrens Fox Co. of Cincinnati, Ohio who produced other models along similar lines. It is notable because of the esteem in which firefighting enthusiasts hold this appliance, which is regarded as the "glamour" vehicle of the NSW Fire Brigades.

The 1942 Ford Canteen is representative of the mobile canteens used in Sydney, during the Second World War. The design of this vehicle is based upon that of the WANS Mobile Canteens in use at that time, and photographs of both the WFA and WANS canteens provide evidence of substantial similarity both internally and externally. The high integrity of its fabric makes it an outstanding representative of its class.

It is an excellent example of a late nineteenth century, steam-powered pumping appliance. In line with other vehicles of this class, it demonstrates an evolutionary process of fire appliance design toward the early years of the twentieth century. It is typical of the workmanship and technology of the Shand Mason Co. of London from whom the Brigade purchased other steamers. It is outstanding due to its power, capacity and size, as well as the esteem in which firefighting enthusiasts hold this appliance, which is regarded as the "glamour" vehicle of the NSW Fire Brigades. This is evidenced by, the articles which have appeared in various publications both from within, and independently of, the NSWFB, as well as the maintenance work carried out regularly by volunteers / enthusiasts at the Museum of Fire, Penrith where this vehicle is now located.

The No. 10 Vehicle Number plates is representative of the item class.

The switchboard is representative of the skill and work of the Metropolitan Fire Brigade firemen in the Brigade workshops, during an era when the brigade was operating under the "in-house" system.

== See also ==
- Fire and Rescue NSW
