= Syracuse and Onondaga County Fire Museum =

Syracuse museum

Coordinates: 43.07044°N 76.16507°W

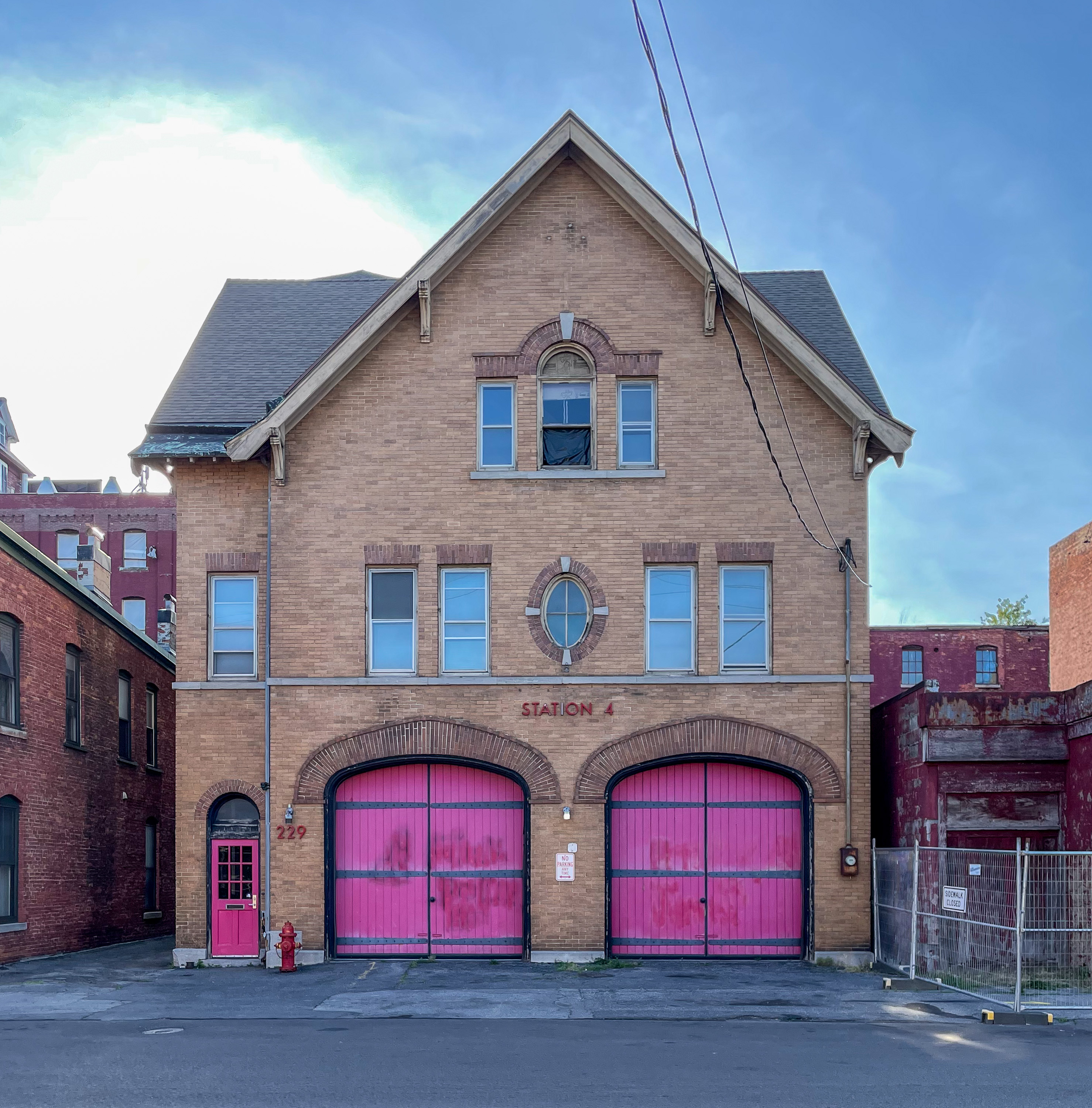
Syracuse Engine Co. 4, 229 Wolf Street

The Syracuse and Onondaga County Fire Museum is a museum in Syracuse, New York to honor the history of the fire service in the City of Syracuse and surrounding areas. The museum is located in the former quarters of Engine Co. 4, on Wolf Street in Syracuse, a station built in the late 1800s. Under the leadership of former IAFF Local 280 President James Ennis, the museum has already received a donation of a former Ahrens-Fox fire engine purchased by the Syracuse Fire Department and which served as Engine 1. Another leader of this project is former Syracuse Chief Dave Reeves, who has kept watch over the history of the Department for years, and led the Department's Historical Committee. His research and collection of memorabilia aids the Museum, and led to the writing of a book, along with Tom Shand, on the history of the Apparatus of the Syracuse Fire Department, titled Signal 99.

== Location ==
The museum is located in the former quarters of Syracuse Fire Department's Engine Co. 4. Located in "Little Italy", the station was built in the late 1800s at 229 Wolf Street, with additional expansions over the years. Engine Co. 4 was disbanded in the mid 1900's, and the building has been largely vacant since then.
