= HME, Incorporated =

U.S. custom truck manufacturer

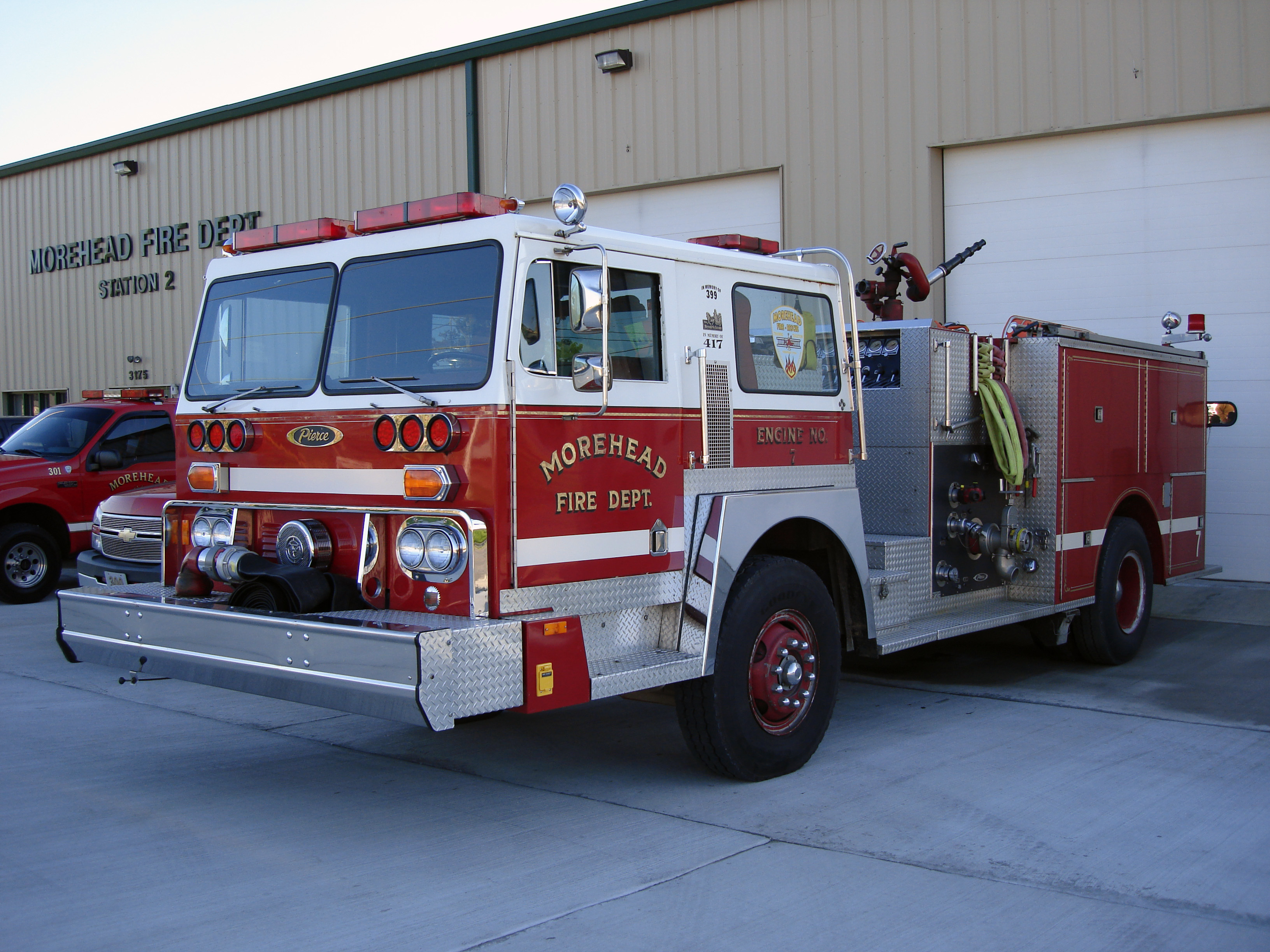
Morehead Fire Department, KY. 1979 Pierce-Hendrickson custom cab Engine 7

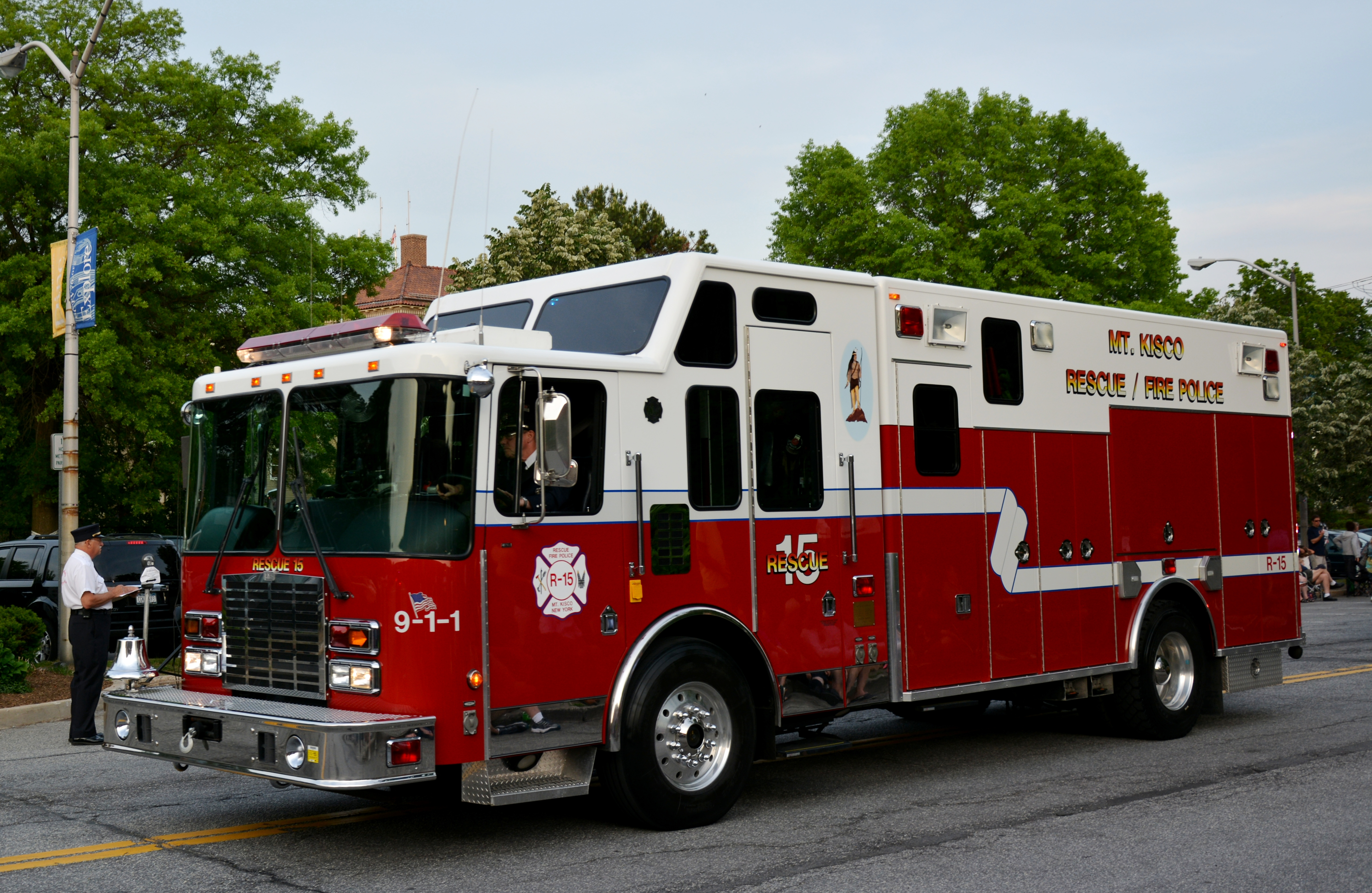
HME Mt. Kisco (NY) Fire/Rescue 15

HME, Incorporated (Hendrickson Mobile Equipment) is a custom fire engine manufacturer in Michigan.

The company was founded in 1913 (113 years ago) as the Hendrickson Motor Truck Company by Magnus Hendrickson. Hendrickson Motor Truck Company was purchased by The Boler Company in 1978 and later sold the truck manufacturing portion in 1985. After the Atonne Group, located in Wyoming, Michigan, purchased the company in 1985, the company changed to specializing in the manufacture of custom fire truck cabs and chassis. HME's fire apparatus carry the model name designations SilverFox and HME Ahrens-Fox.

HME was the first custom fire truck manufacturer to build a tilt cab model cab-over chassis and the first manufacturer to create a compressed natural gas-powered fire apparatus.

== Products ==
- HME Ahrens-Fox 1871-W
- HME Ahrens-Fox Core 62
- HME Ahrens-Fox Core 07
