= Ahrens-Fox Fire Engine Company =

Defunct American motor vehicle manufacturer

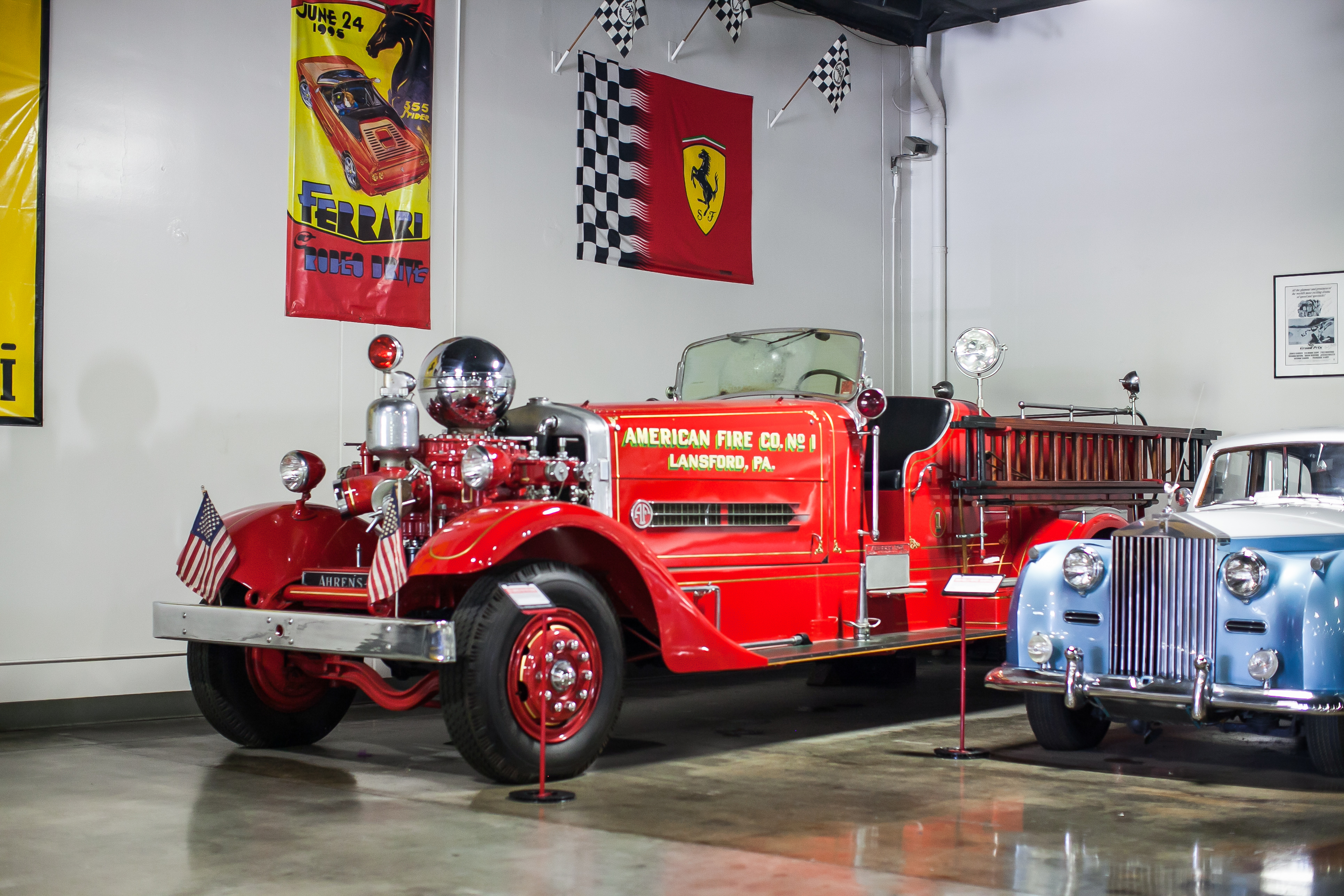
- 1937 Ahrens-Fox Fire Engine at the Automotive Museum
- Type: Fire Apparatus Manufacturer
- Predecessor: Latta
- Founded: 1910; 116 years ago
- Headquarters: Cincinnati, Ohio, USA

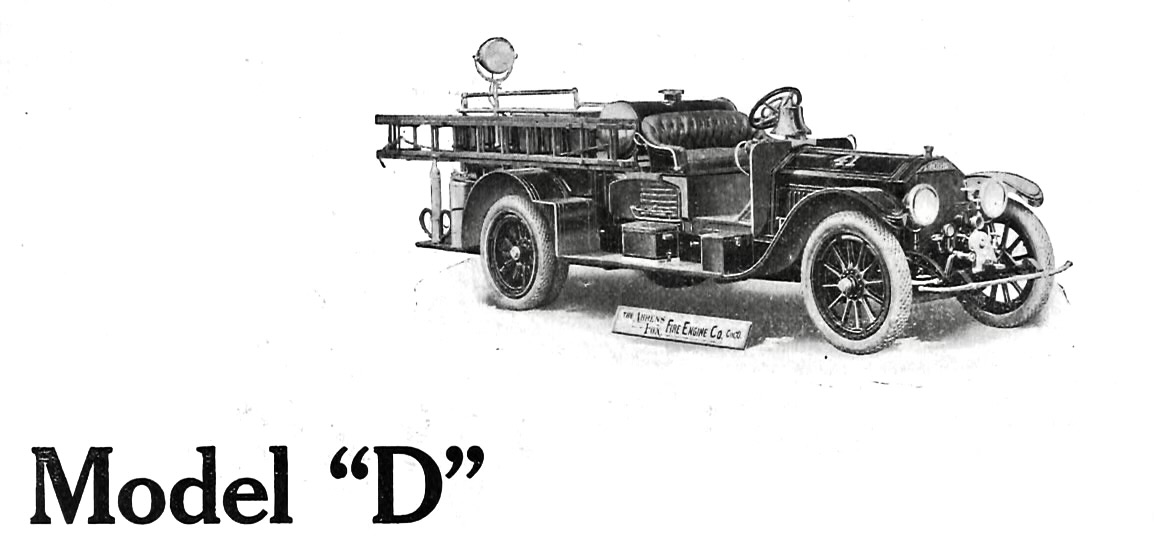
Ahrens-Fox Model D (1913)

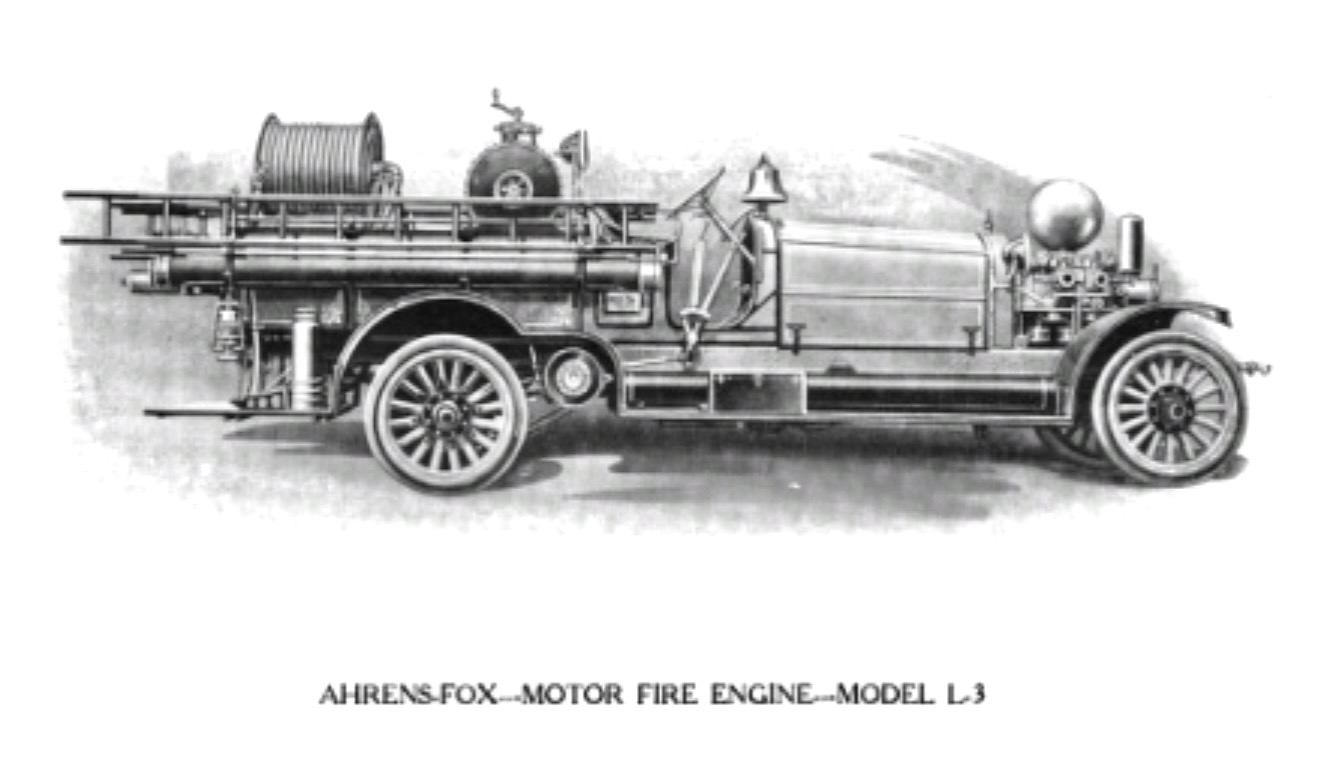
Ahrens-Fox Model L-3 (1915-1917)

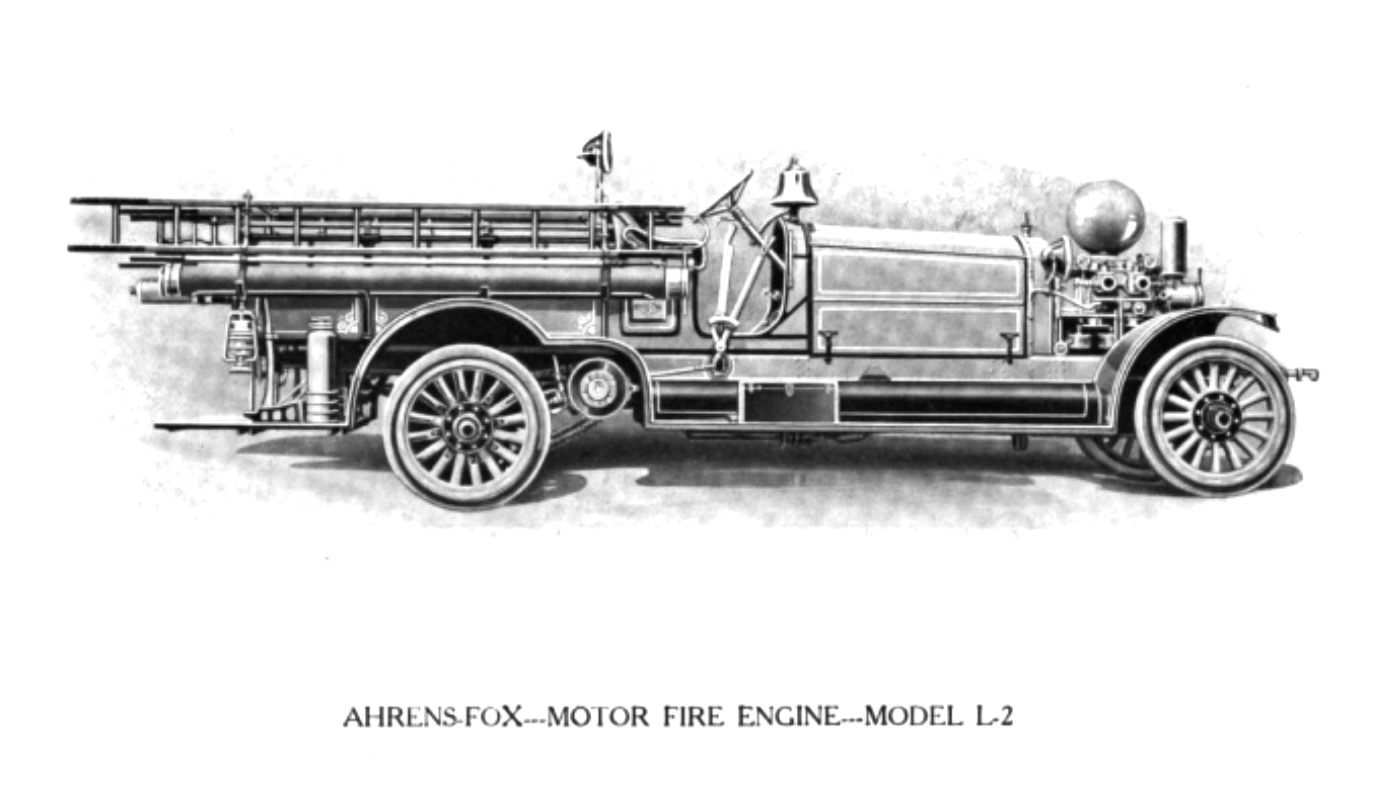
Ahrens-Fox Model L-2 (1915-1917)

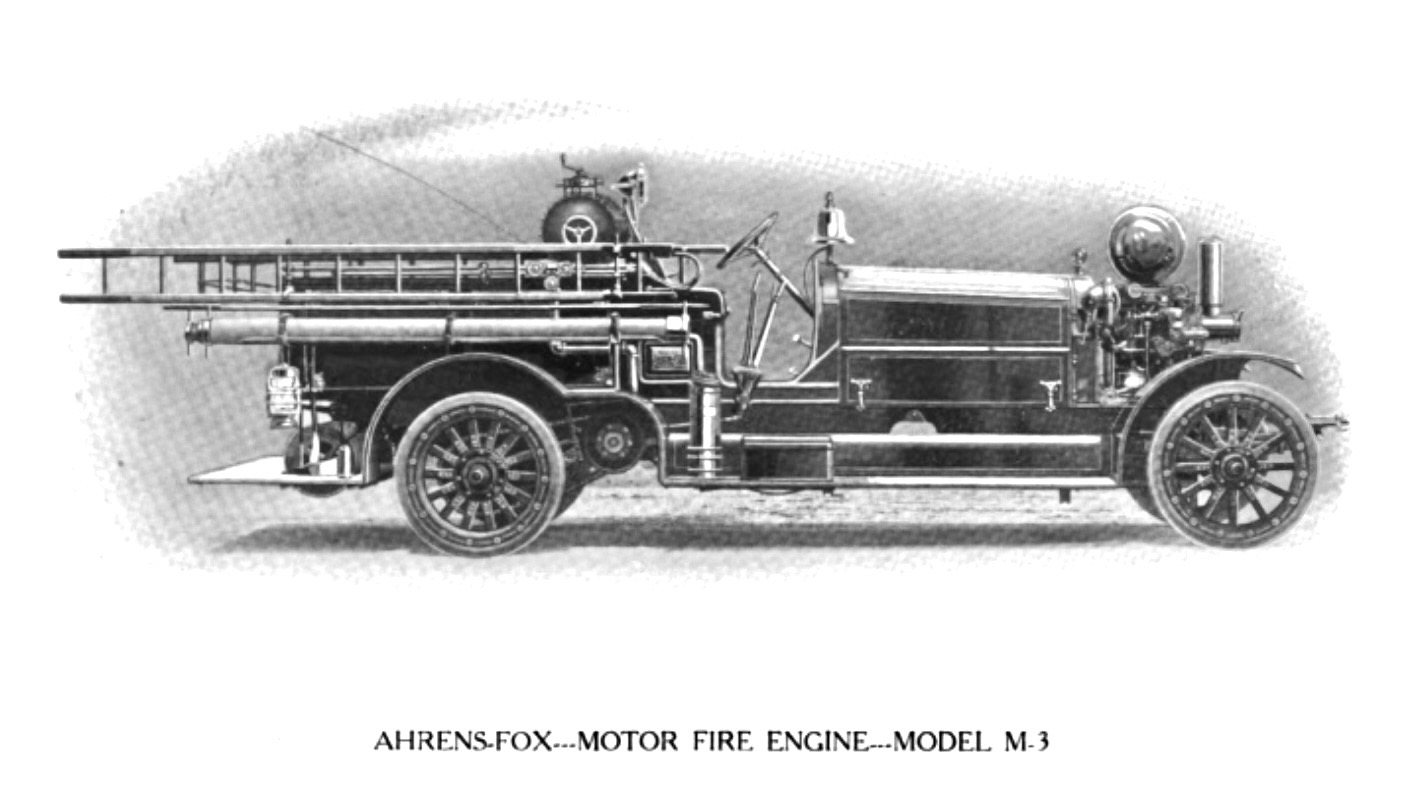
Ahrens-Fox Model M-3 (1915-1916)

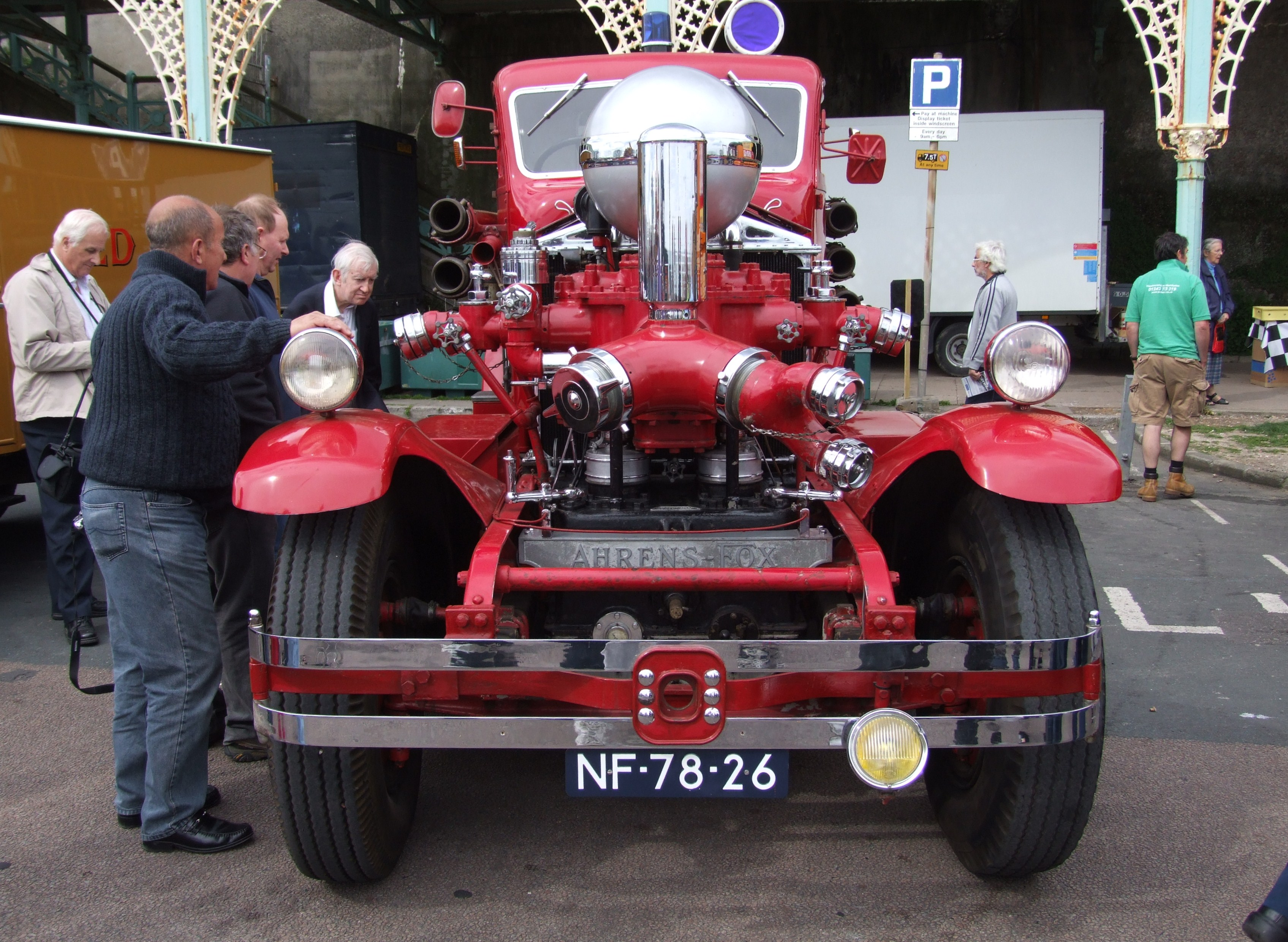
1927 Ahrens-Fox fire engine

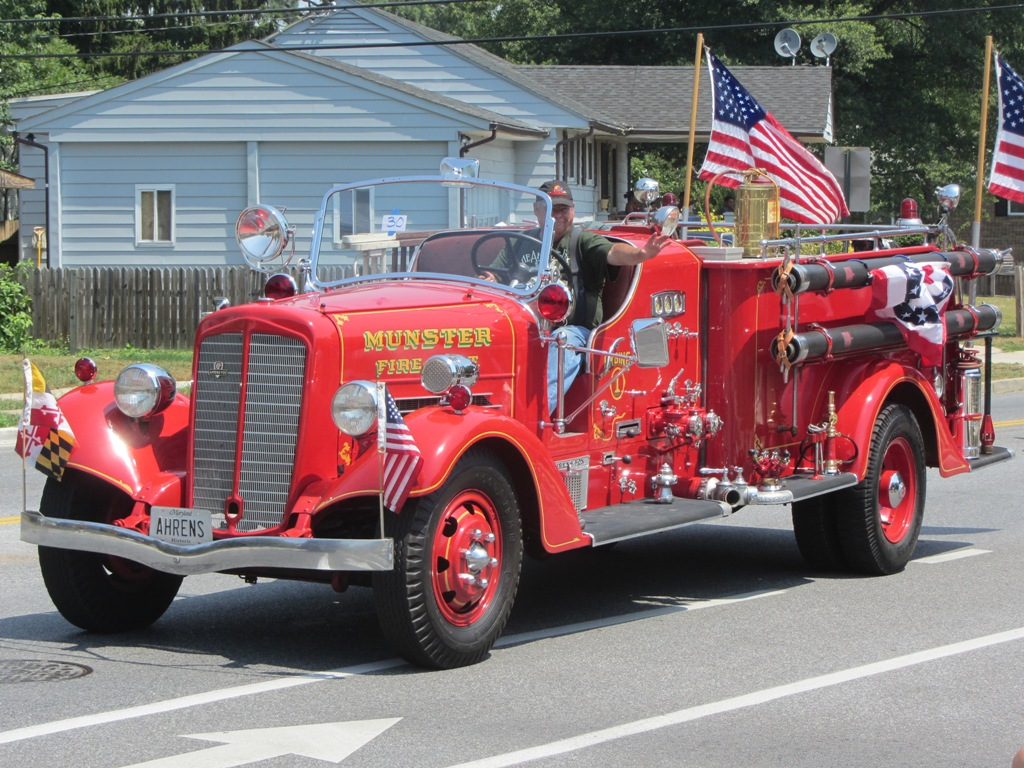
1939 Ahrens-Fox engine

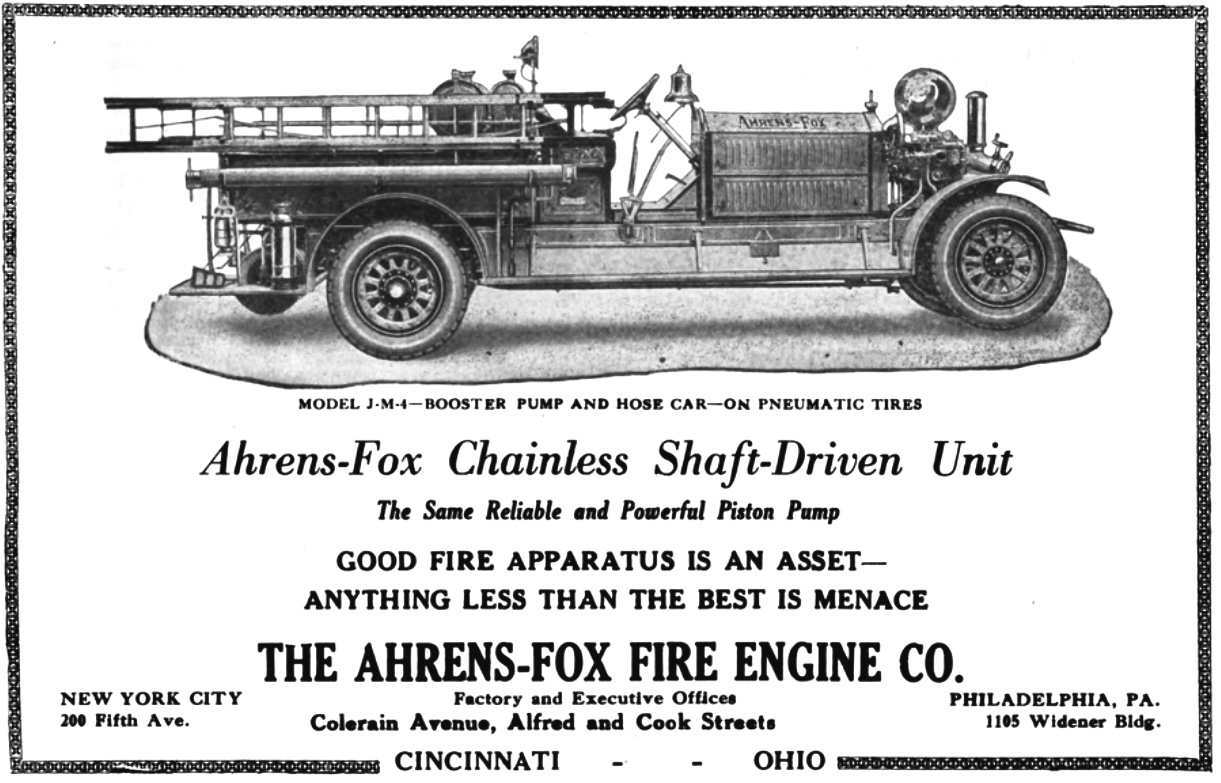
Ahrens-Fox Fire Engine Company (1922) advertisement

The Ahrens-Fox Fire Engine Company was an Ohio-based fire truck manufacturer. The company was founded in 1910 by John P Ahrens and Charles H Fox and built its first motorized fire engine in 1911. By the end of the following year production of horse-drawn fire apparatus ceased completely. Since then, over 1500 pieces of fire apparatus were built until 1977. Ahrens-Fox fire engines were recognizable by the chromed sphere above the pump that held air and smoothed the outgoing pressure fluctuations from the piston pump.

During the year 1913 only, Ahrens-Fox built a 44 hp (following then-actual rating practice) automobile. Like at rival American LaFrance, the idea was to sell these cars to bigger fire brigades as a car of duty for their chiefs. Also like at ALF, it was not successful for Ahrens-Fox either, although for Ahrens-Fox the results were more consequential; there was only one model, a huge six-cylinder called the E-C Battalion Roadster. It was guaranteed to go faster than 50 mph, and featured a four speed gearbox. A small pickup bed was added for some items that were thought to be useful for the head of a fire brigade, and was included in the base price. Only six of these roadster-pickups were built during 1913; it seems all stayed in Cincinnati. Ahrens-Fox abandoned the idea and never returned to it. In 1913, the Ahrens-Fox model D was produced. In 1930, the Ahrens-Fox Quad was produced in only eight units.

Today, Ahrens-Fox and all of its assets, parts, and paper is owned by W. Kenneth Menke III, president of the Fire Products Company (Powerarc), Webster Groves, Missouri. The Ahrens-Fox name is licensed to HME, Incorporated, which also manufactured Hendrickson Trucks.

The old Ahrens-Fox factory at 214 East 14th Street in Over-the-Rhine has been converted into luxury condominiums.
