= List of people from Syracuse, New York =

The following people are from Syracuse, New York.

== Born or brought up in the City of Syracuse ==
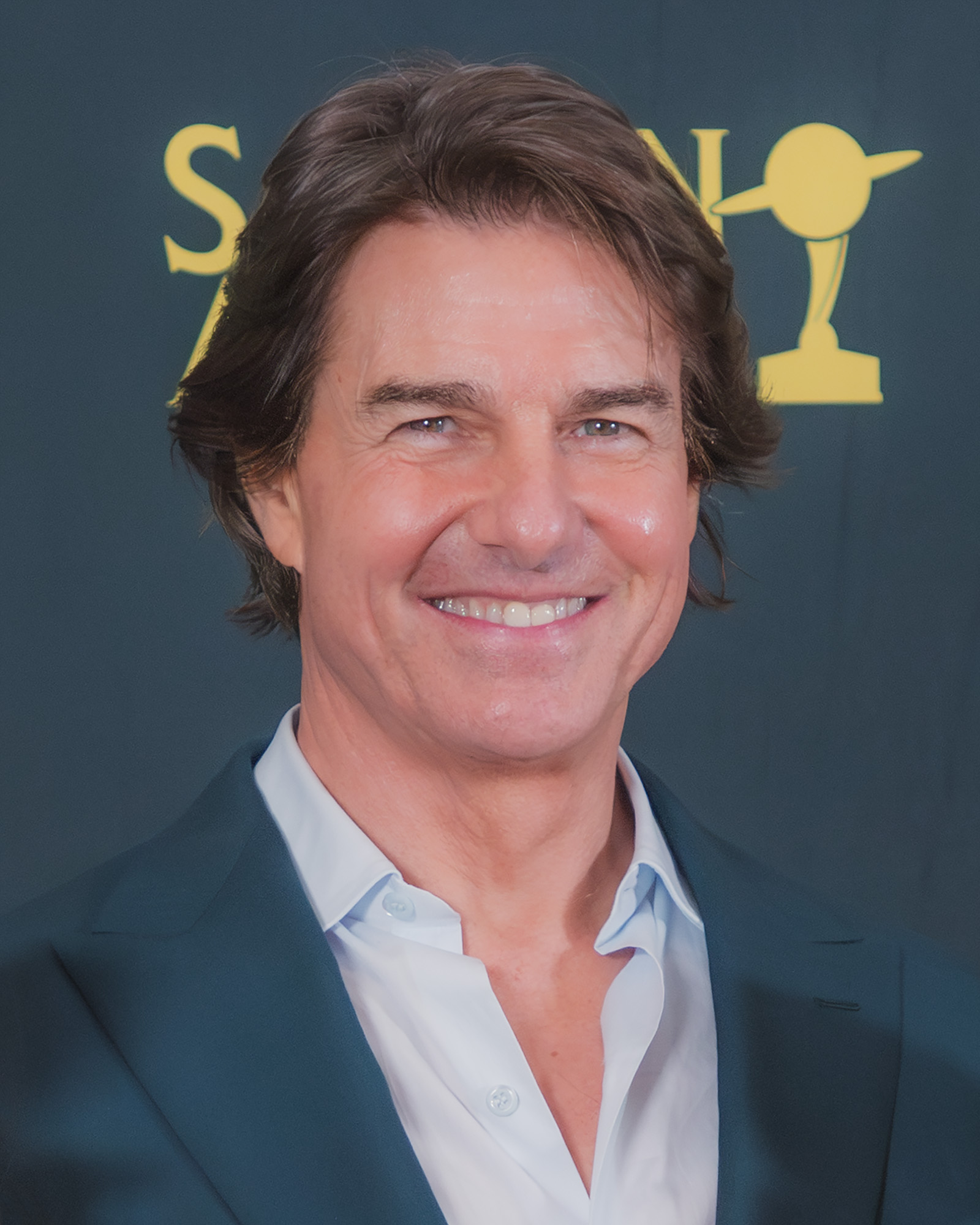
Tom Cruise

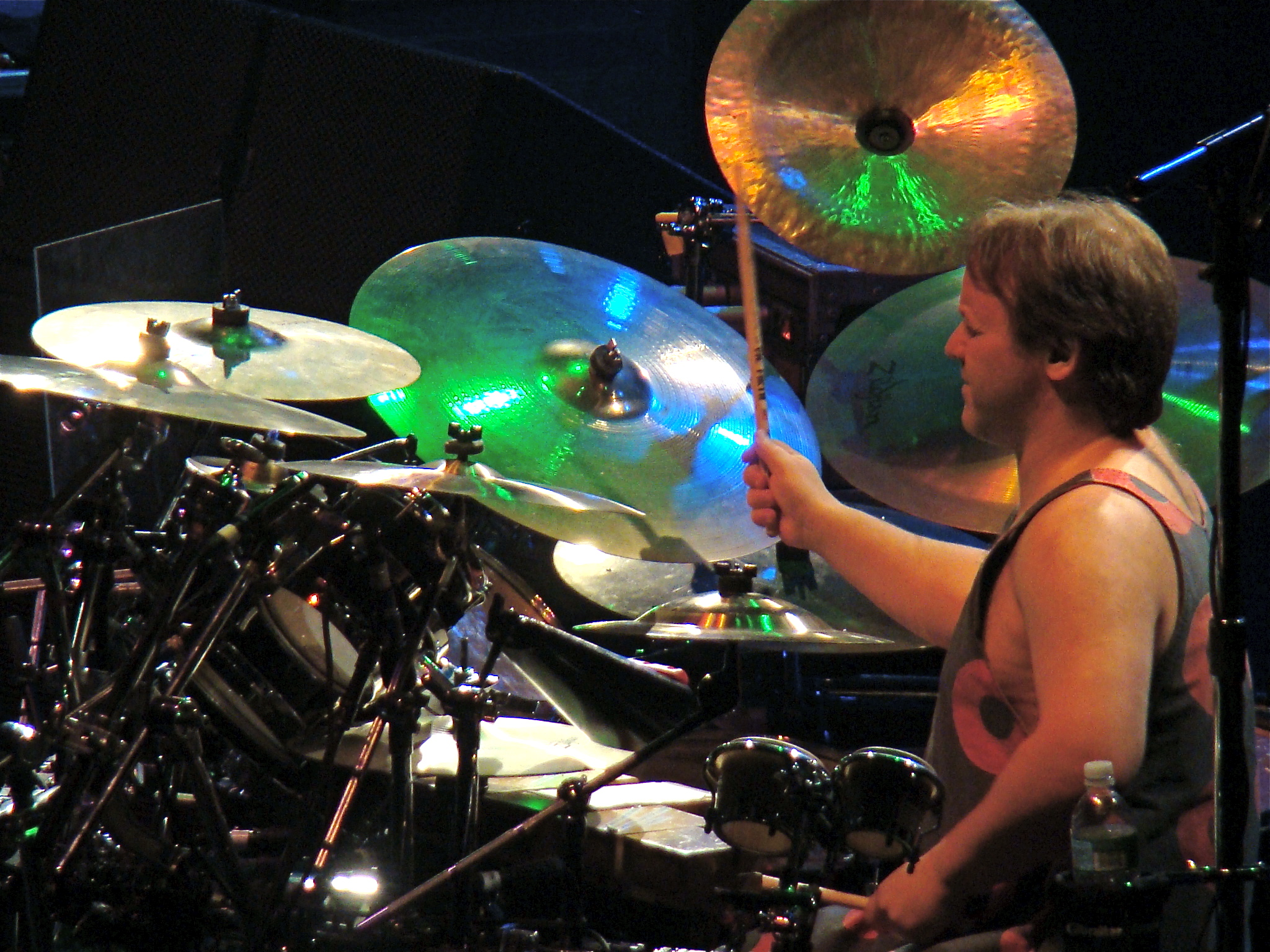
Jon Fishman

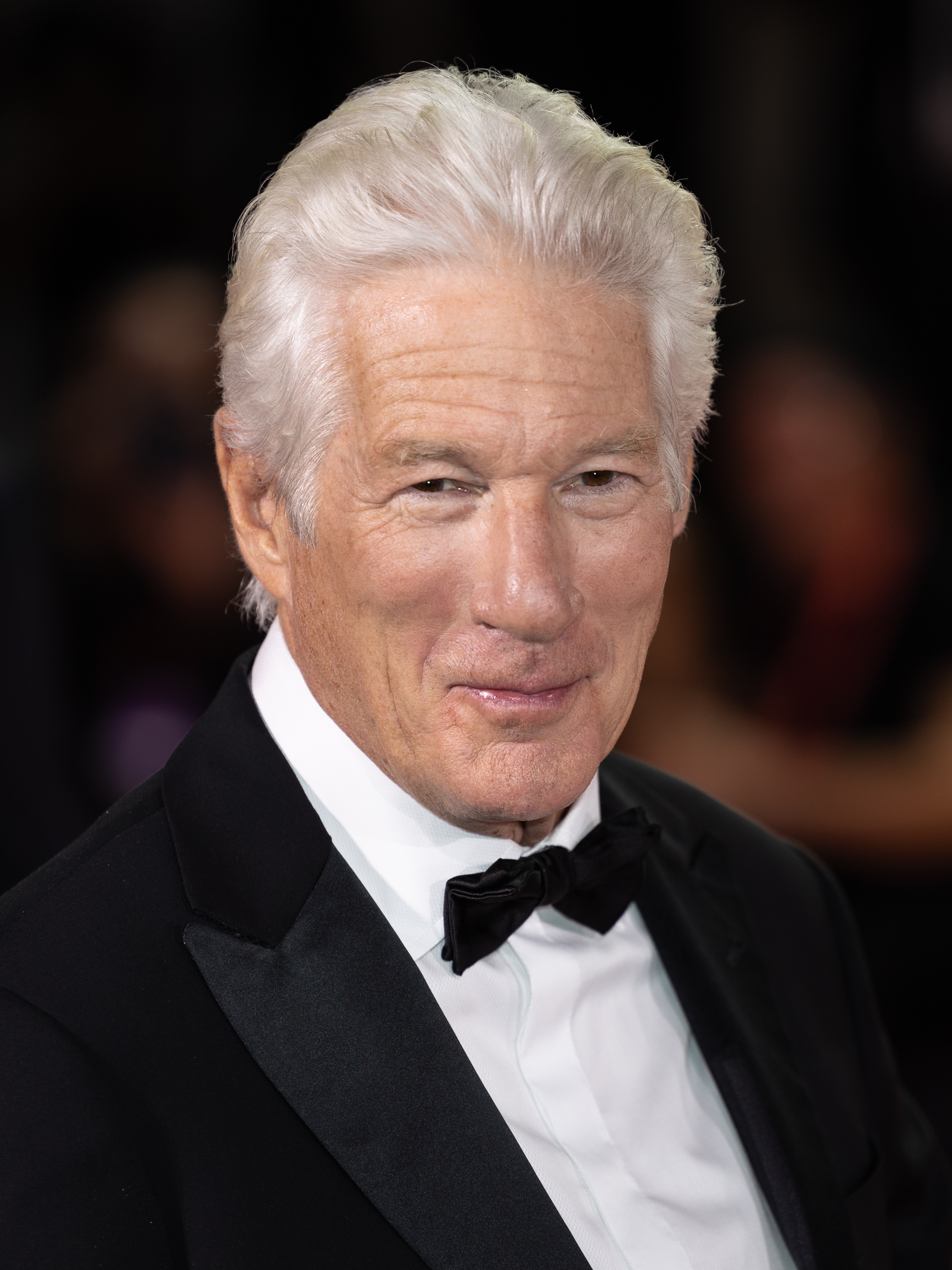
Richard Gere

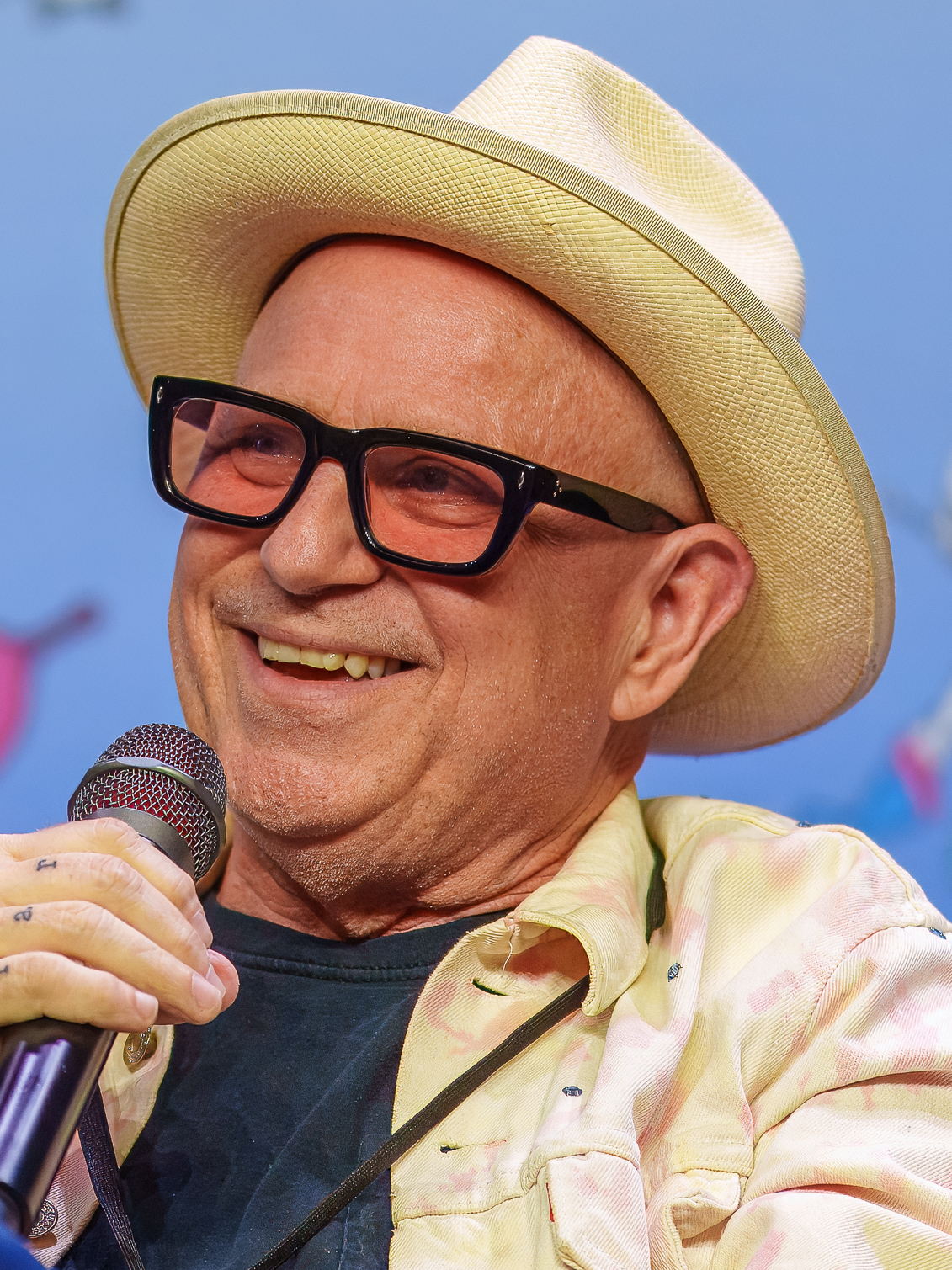
Bobcat Goldthwait

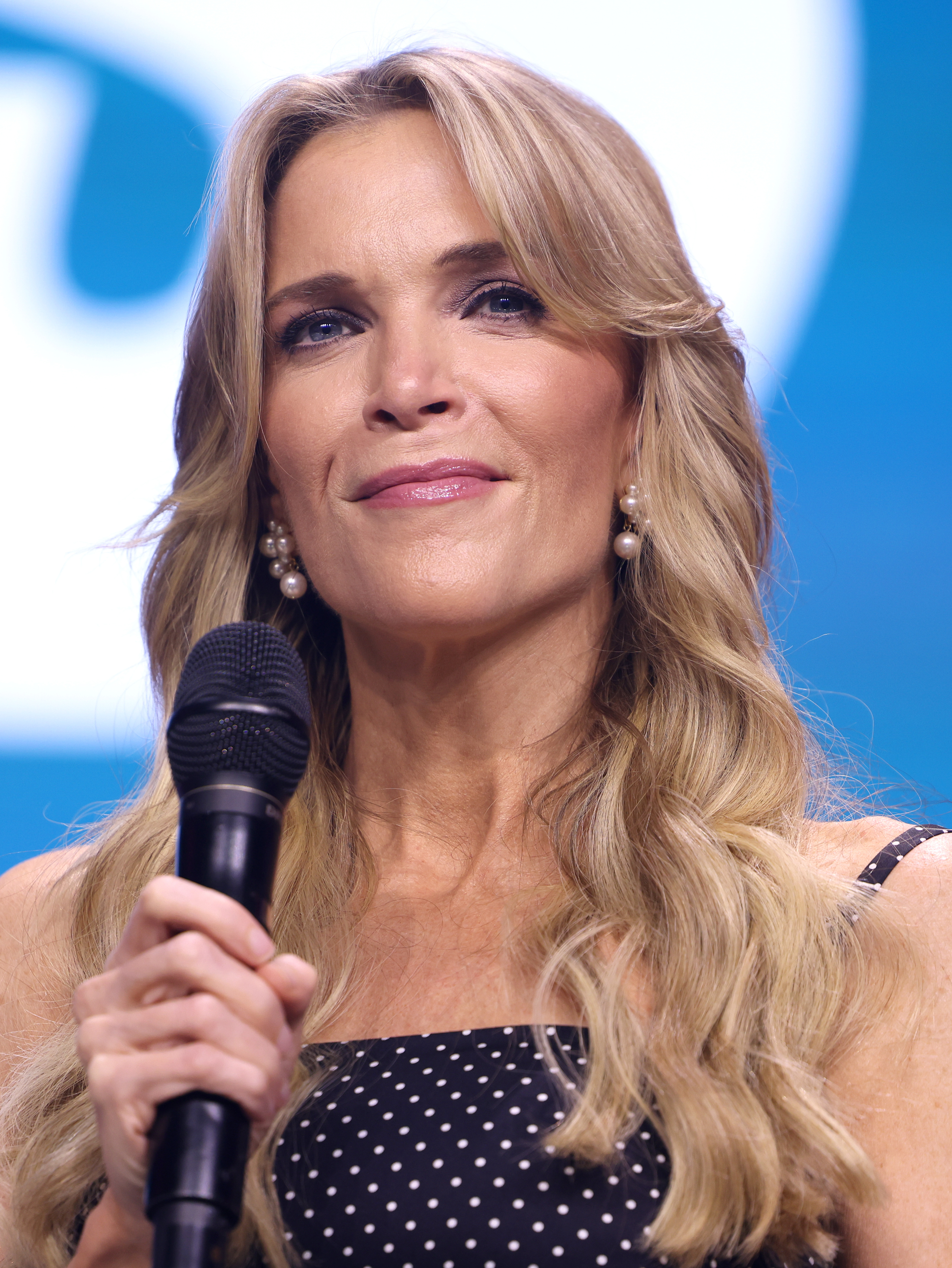
Megyn Kelly

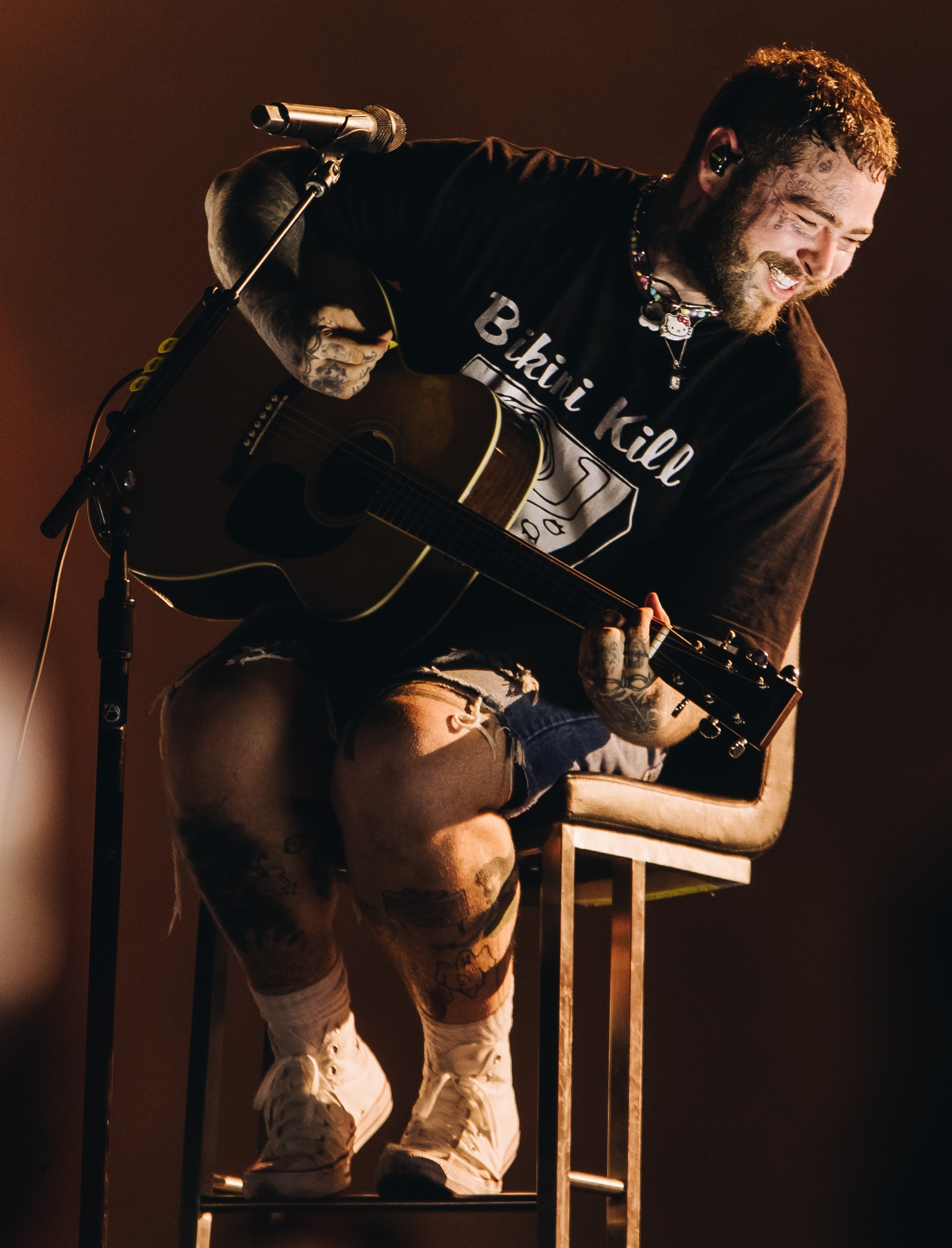
Post Malone

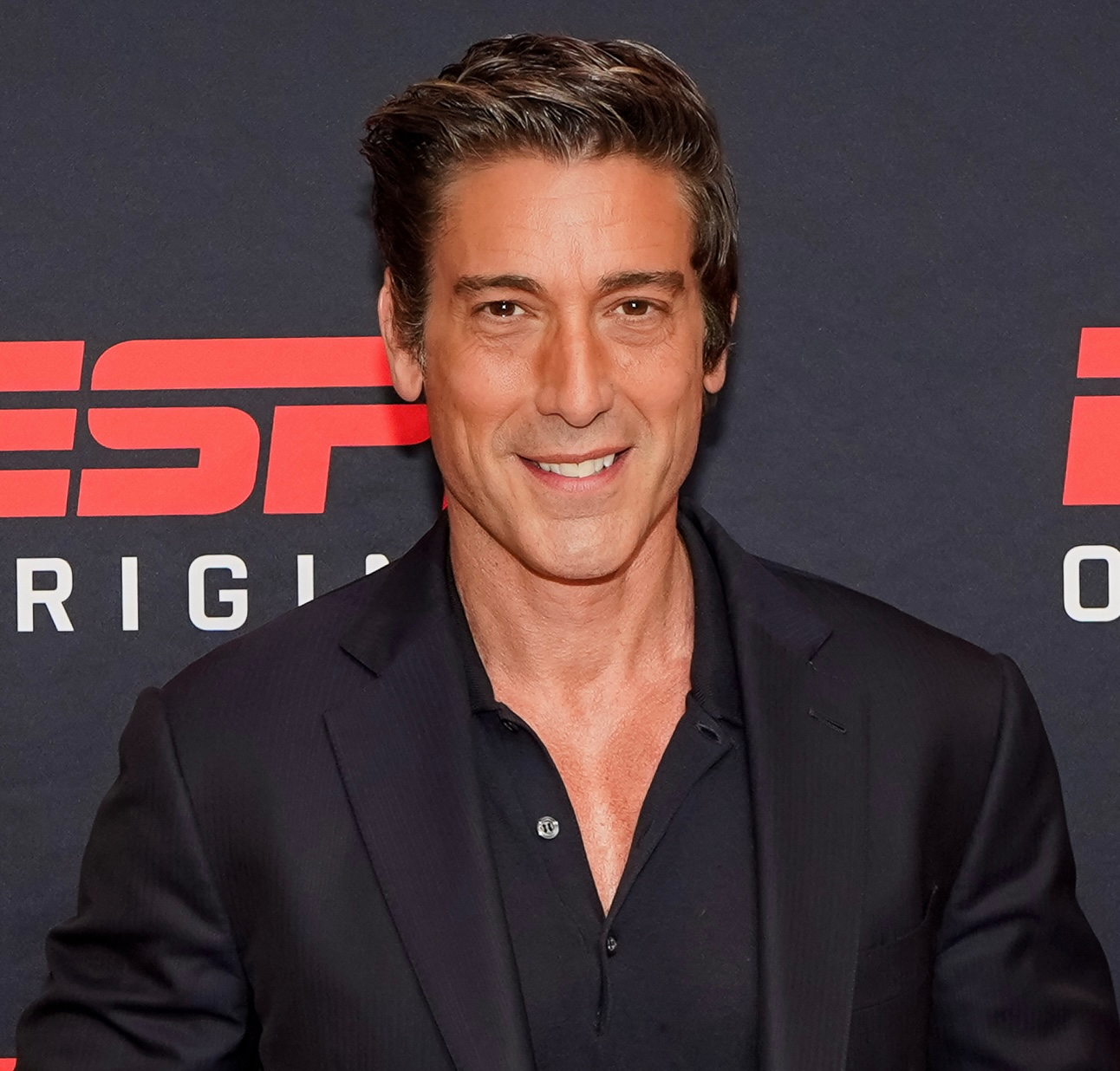
David Muir

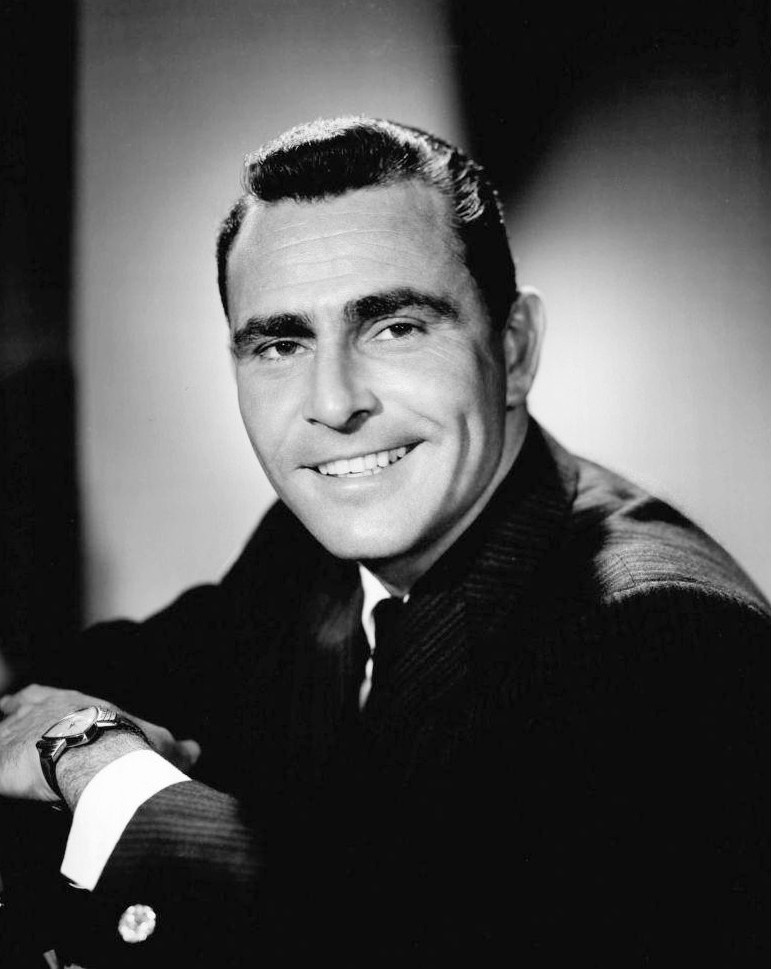
Rod Serling

- Keith B. Alexander – four-star general in the Army and director of the NSA
- Jabe B. Alford – mayor of Madison, Wisconsin
- Will Allen – professional football player
- Jeff Altman – stand-up comedian and actor
- Maltbie Davenport Babcock – clergyman and author
- Dylan Baker – actor
- John William Barker – brigadier general in the Army
- Marcus H. Barnum – lawyer, businessman, and politician
- Bill Beagle – state senator for the 5th district of the Ohio
- Kathryn Beare – professional baseball player
- John Berendt – author of Midnight in the Garden of Good and Evil
- Carlyle Blackwell – silent film actor, director, and producer
- Andray Blatche – professional basketball player
- Scott Blewett – professional baseball player
- Richard Bock – jazz record producer
- Alex Bono – professional soccer player
- Tyvon Branch – professional football player
- Charles F. Brannock – inventor and manufacturer
- Frederick C. Brower – locksmith, inventor, and businessman
- Rick Brunson – professional basketball player and coach
- Ben Burtt – sound designer, film director and editor, screenwriter, and voice actor
- Marty Byrnes – professional basketball player
- Georgia Campbell – professional baseball player
- Jean Campbell – professional baseball player
- Eric Carle – children's author
- Jimmy Cavallo – musician
- Rory Cochrane – actor
- Michael Cole – professional wrestling commentator
- Jimmy Collins – professional basketball player and college coach
- Jackie Coogan – actor and comedian
- Bruce Coville – children's author
- Tom Cruise – Oscar-nominated, Golden Globe Award-winning actor and producer
- Rick Cua – singer, songwriter, bassist, author, and ordained minister
- Kelly Cutrone – publicist, television personality, and author
- Mabel Potter Daggett – writer, journalist, editor, and suffragist
- Nina Davuluri – public speaker, advocate, and beauty queen
- Robert De Niro Sr. – abstract expressionist painter and father of actor Robert De Niro
- Mark Didio – professional football player
- Blanche Dillaye – artist
- Bill Dinneen – professional baseball player and umpire
- Frank DiPino – professional baseball player
- Jo-Lonn Dunbar – professional football player
- Robert F. Engle – economist and winner of the 2003 Nobel Prize in Economics
- Joe English – musician, vocalist, and songwriter
- Jeanette Epps – aerospace engineer and NASA astronaut
- Walter Farley – author of The Black Stallion
- David B. Feinberg – writer and AIDS activist
- Thom Filicia – interior designer
- Jon Fishman – drummer and founding member of Phish
- Eliot Fisk – classical guitarist
- Frank Gabrielson – stage, film, and television writer
- Philip Gannon – member of the Wisconsin State Assembly
- John L. Gaunt – photographer and winner of the 1955 Pulitzer Prize for Photography
- Richard Gere – Golden Globe Award-winning actor
- Helena Theresa Goessmann – lecturer, academic, and writer
- Bobcat Goldthwait – actor, comedian, director, and screenwriter
- John Robert Greene – historian and writer
- David Greenman – actor
- Henry Grethel – fashion designer, merchandiser, and marketer
- Bob Gualtieri – law enforcement officer, lawyer, and politician
- Borys Gudziak – metropolitan-archbishop of the Ukrainian Catholic Archeparchy of Philadelphia
- Jaclyn Hales – actress
- Muhammad Hassan – professional wrestler
- Michael Herr – writer and war correspondent
- Theodore Hesburgh – president of the University of Notre Dame
- Mary Dana Hicks – art educator
- Siobhan Fallon Hogan – actress and comedian
- Bob Holz – drummer and composer
- Jimmy Howard – professional ice hockey player
- Charley Hyatt – college basketball player
- David Jennings – member of the Wisconsin State Assembly
- Grace Jones – model, singer, and actress
- Mark Kaplan – violinist
- John Katko – attorney and politician
- Megyn Kelly – journalist and media personality
- Mr. Kenneth – world's first celebrity hairdresser
- Tom Kenny – actor and comedian
- Doris Kenyon – actress
- Phyllis Kirk – actress
- David Klein – confectioner and developer of Jelly Belly
- Nathan Knight – professional basketball player
- Zane Lamprey – comedian, actor, writer, editor, and producer
- Dorsey Levens – professional football player
- Alex Levinsky – professional ice hockey player
- Claire Luce – actress
- Clifford Luyk – professional basketball player and coach
- Gordon MacRae – actor, singer, and television and radio host
- Joe Magnarelli – jazz trumpeter and flugelhornist
- Post Malone – rapper, singer, songwriter, and record producer
- Christopher Maloney – singer-songwriter, bass guitarist, and music educator
- John Mannion – U.S. representative for New York
- Louis Marshall – corporate, constitutional, and civil rights lawyer
- Frank Matteo – professional football player
- Edna May – actress and singer
- Terry McAuliffe – businessman and politician
- Johnny McArdell (1934–2021) – Hall of Fame auto racing driver
- William McCoy – sea captain and rum-runner
- Johnny Messner – actor
- Stephen Montague – composer, pianist, and conductor
- Darin Morgan – screenwriter
- David Muir – journalist and the anchor of ABC World News Tonight
- Jonathan Murray – television producer and co-creator of The Real World
- Spencer Murphy – bassist, producer, and composer
- James Nachtwey – photojournalist and war photographer
- Richard Neer – disc jockey and sports radio personality
- Sal Nistico – jazz tenor saxophonist
- Joy Osofsky – clinical and developmental psychologist
- Camille Paglia – social critic and author
- Doe Paoro – singer-songwriter
- Greg Paulus – college basketball player and coach
- Steve Perry – musician
- Marco Pignalberi – politician
- Rocco Pirro – professional football player and politician
- Jon Ratliff – professional baseball player
- Mark Reed – physicist and professor
- Jamel Richardson – professional football player
- Harold E. Robinson – botanist and entomologist
- Ed Rombola – stage and television actor
- Mike Rotunda – professional wrestler best known as Irwin R. Schyster
- Ellis Rubin – attorney
- Marc Ryan – radio personality
- Margaret Olivia Slocum Sage – philanthropist who established the Russell Sage Foundation
- Louis J. Salmon – football player and head coach of the University of Notre Dame
- Mary Gay Scanlon – U.S. representative for Pennsylvania
- Danny Schayes – professional basketball player
- George Schuyler – writer, journalist, and social commentator
- Scott Schwedes – professional football player
- Scorey – rapper, singer, and songwriter
- Ray Seals – professional football player
- Rod Serling – screenwriter, playwright, television producer, and narrator
- Martin Sexton – singer-songwriter and music producer
- Craig Shirley – political consultant and author
- Edward C. Stearns – entrepreneur and industrialist
- Breanna Stewart – professional basketball player
- Ed Stokes – professional basketball player
- Joseph Stolz – rabbi
- William Strobeck – filmmaker, director, videographer, and photographer
- Kevin Surace – technology innovator and entrepreneur
- Bob Swan – business executive and CEO of Intel
- Charles W. Sweeting – businessman and politician
- Bill Tanguay – professional football player
- Tommy Tanner – professional soccer player
- TimTheTatman – live streamer and YouTube personality
- Toosii – rapper and singer
- Tony Trischka – five-string banjo player
- Tsquared – professional gamer
- Jimmy Van Heusen – composer who authored the jazz standard "Darn That Dream"
- Walt Weiskopf – jazz saxophonist, collaborator with Steely Dan and others
- Frank Whaley – actor, film director, screenwriter, and comedian
- John Wilkinson – engineer and inventor
- Carl Woese – microbiologist and biophysicist
- Christopher Woodrow – entrepreneur, financier, and movie producer
- Merry Ann Thompson Wright – businesswoman who served as the 42nd president general of DAR
- T. M. Wright – author

== Born or brought up in Greater Syracuse ==
Grover Cleveland

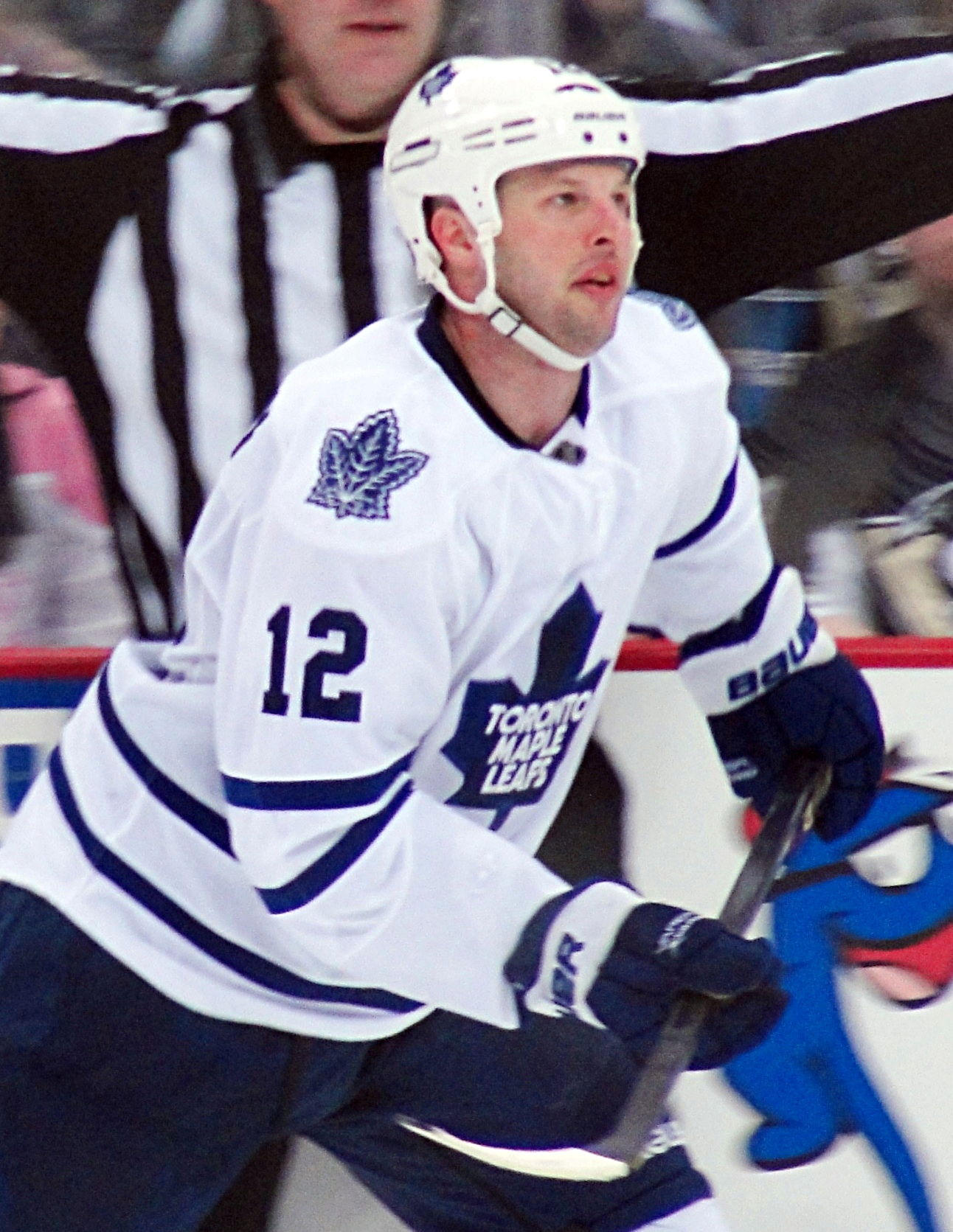
Tim Connolly

- L. Frank Baum – children's author best known for The Wonderful Wizard of Oz (Chittenango)
- Joey Belladonna – singer best known as the vocalist for Anthrax (Oswego)
- Grover Cleveland – served as the 22nd and 24th president of the United States (Fayetteville)
- Tim Connolly – professional ice hockey player (Baldwinsville)
- John Desko – head coach of men's lacrosse team at Syracuse University (Camillus)
- Ronnie James Dio – singer and member of Black Sabbath and Rainbow (Cortland)
- Pete Dominick – political comedian and talk radio personality (Marcellus)
- Joel Farabee – professional ice hockey player (Cicero)
- Matilda Joslyn Gage – activist known for her contributions to women's suffrage and abolitionism (Fayetteville)
- Irving Gill – pioneer modern architect in Southern California (Tully)
- Tim Green – professional football player, radio and television personality, and author (Liverpool)
- Thomas Harley – professional ice hockey player (Jamesville)
- Mike Hart – professional football player and college coach (Nedrow)
- Gary Holland – musician best known for being the original drummer of Great White (LaFayette)
- Tim Locastro – professional baseball player (Auburn)
- Dave Mirra – professional BMX rider (Chittenango)
- Harvey A. Moyer – entrepreneur and founder of H. A. Moyer Automobile Company (Clay)
- Bert E. Salisbury – businessman and president of Onondaga Pottery Company (Geddes)
- Horatio Seymour – politician and 18th governor of New York (Pompey)
- Alex Tuch – professional ice hockey player (Baldwinsville)
- John Walsh – television personality and host/creator of America's Most Wanted (Auburn)

== Others with ties to the Syracuse area ==
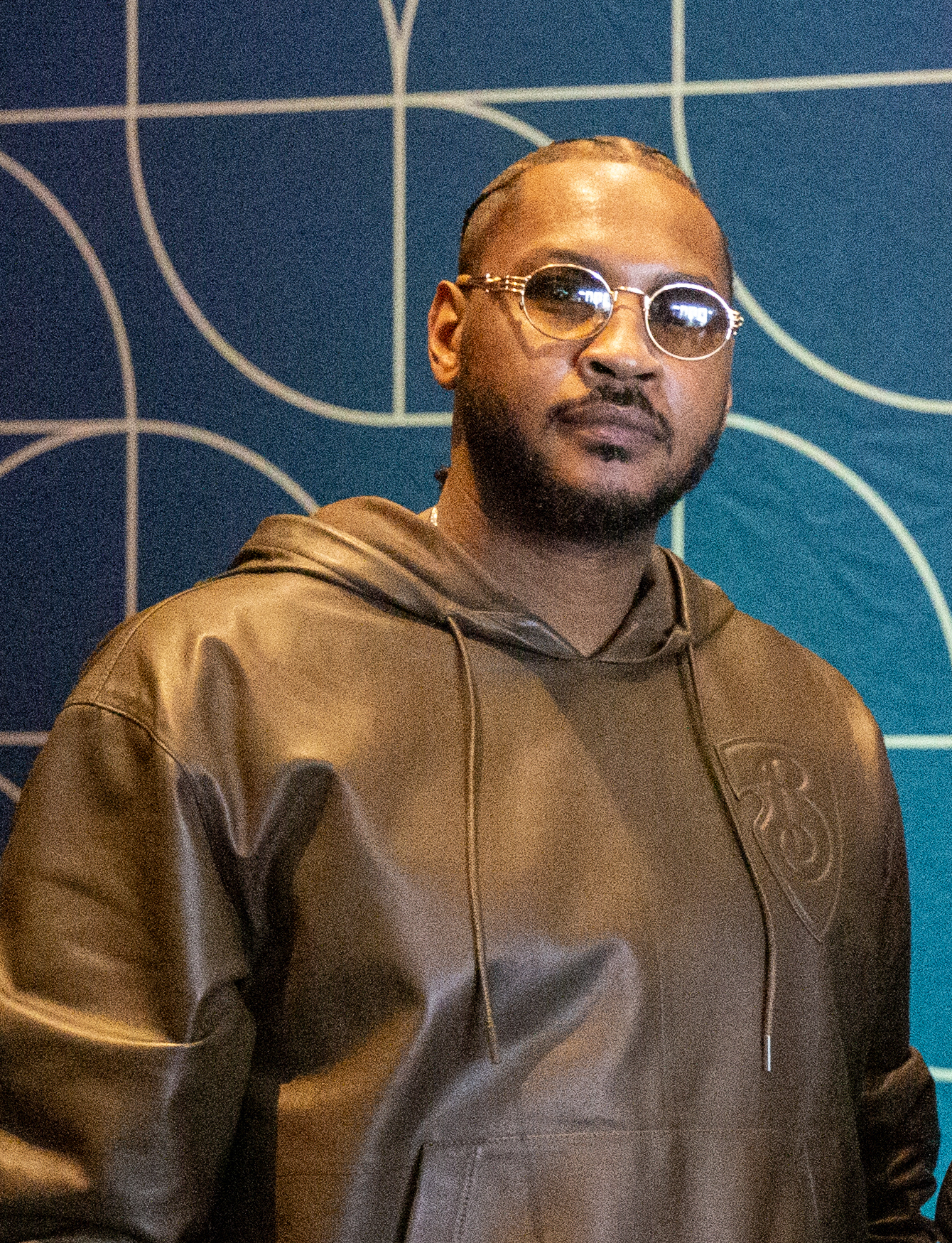
Carmelo Anthony

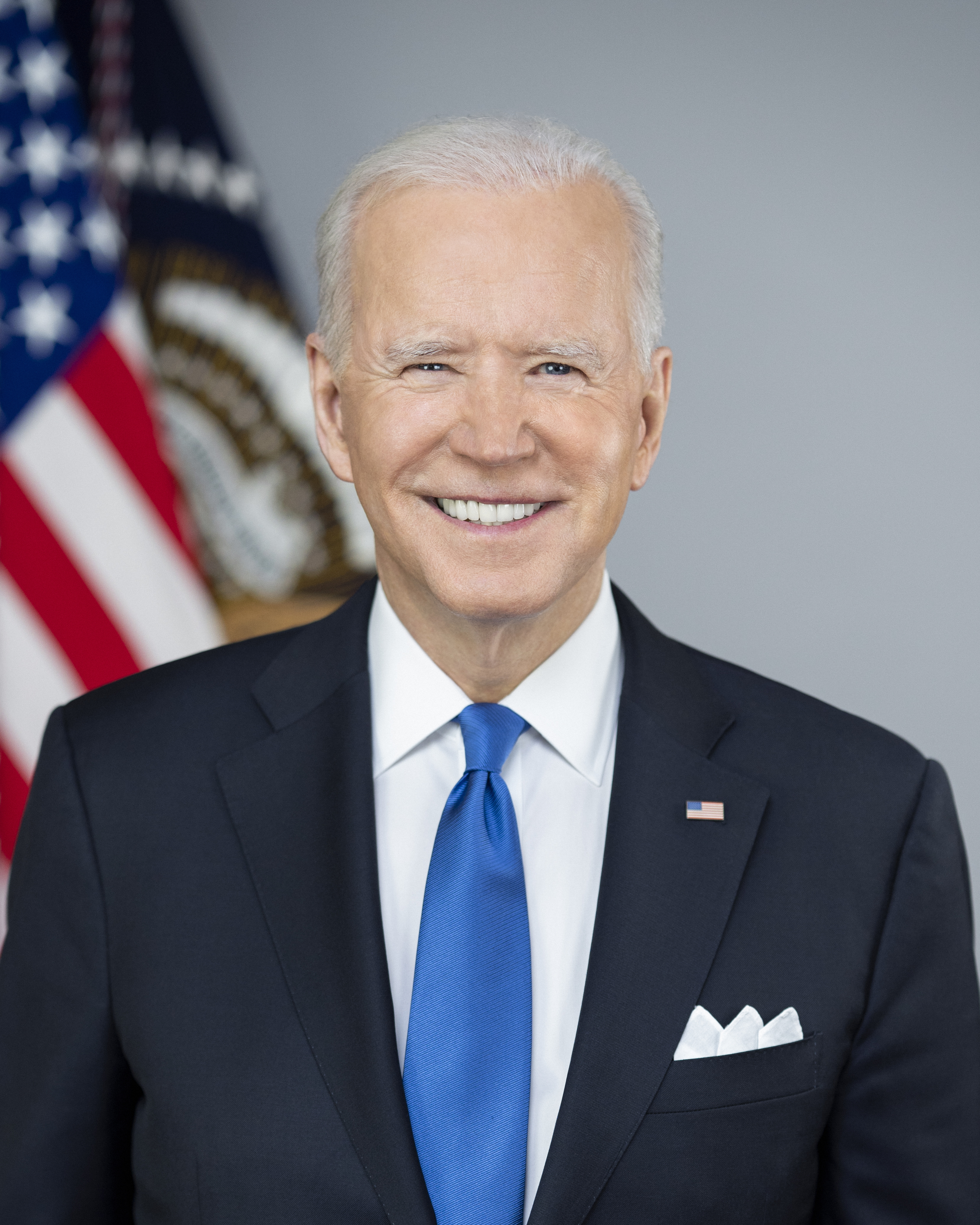
Joe Biden

- Hervey Allen – author best known for Anthony Adverse, which was made into a movie of the same name, resided in an extant house on James Street
- Mary Raymond Shipman Andrews – author best known for a widely read short story about U.S. president Abraham Lincoln, The Perfect Tribute, resided at Wolf Hollow, the Andrews estate in Taunton
- Carmelo Anthony – basketball player at Syracuse University who delivered the program's first NCAA Championship in 2003
- Danny Biasone – founding owner of the NBA's Syracuse Nationals in 1946
- Joe Biden – served as the 46th president of the United States; graduated from Syracuse University College of Law in 1968
- Lucy Wood Butler – pioneer temperance leader, who was the first president of the Woman's Christian Temperance Union of New York, lived in Syracuse for more than 50 years
- DeWitt Clinton – served as mayor of New York City and the sixth governor of New York; played a significant role in the construction of the Erie Canal
- Elizabeth Cotten – folk and blues musician who lived much of her later life in Syracuse and for whom a bronze statue is dedicated
- Asa Danforth – early settler who built a gristmill and sawmill that contributed to the growth of Onondaga County
- Asa Danforth Jr. – early settler, land speculator, and highway engineer
- Herbert H. Franklin – entrepreneur and automobile manufacturer for whom Franklin Square is named
- James Geddes – engineer, surveyor, and politician instrumental in the planning of the Erie Canal who was also at the forefront of the development of the salt industry at Onondaga Lake beginning in 1794
- Theodore E. Hancock – lawyer and politician who served as district attorney of Onondaga County from 1890 to 1892
- Bucky Lawless – professional boxer based in Syracuse from the mid-1920s to the mid-1930s
- Simon Le Moyne – Jesuit priest who, in 1655, founded a mission known as Sainte Marie de Gannentaha, and for whom Le Moyne College is named
- Jermain Loguen – key contributor to the Underground Railroad who helped make Syracuse a leading abolitionist city
- Pierre-Esprit Radisson – explorer and coureur des bois who traveled into Onondaga territory to aid Le Moyne and operate his mission
- C. Hamilton Sanford – businessman and president of the Syracuse Trust Company and co-founder of Sanford-Herbert Motor Truck Company
- Kim Simmonds – musician and founder of the English blues rock band Savoy Brown
- Comfort Tyler – early settler, businessman, and politician for whom Comfort Tyler Park is named
- William Van Wagoner – bicycle racer and automobile designer
- David Foster Wallace – author who wrote much of his landmark novel Infinite Jest while living in an apartment on Kensington Road across from the food co-op
- Ephraim Webster – first white settler in Central New York who arrived in 1786 to an area later named Syracuse
- John Wilkinson – lawyer and politician who gave Syracuse its name and founded the Syracuse Bank
- Steve Wynn – casino and hotel tycoon who attended The Manlius School
