= Syracuse Telephonic Exchange =

- Company type: Telecommunications
- Industry: Telecommunications
- Genre: Telephone exchanges
- Founded: 1880
- Fate: New York Telephone Company was a consolidation of all private telephone exchanges in New York State
- Headquarters: Syracuse, New York, United States
- Area served: United States
- Key people: Frederick C. Brower, Hiram C. Brower, Mathew J. Myers and D. L. Pyke
- Services: Telephone services

The Syracuse Telephonic Exchange was founded after Frederick C. Brower introduced the Bell telephone to Syracuse, New York in 1878.
