= Lucius Gleason House =

Historic building in New York (state)

- U.S. National Register of Historic Places
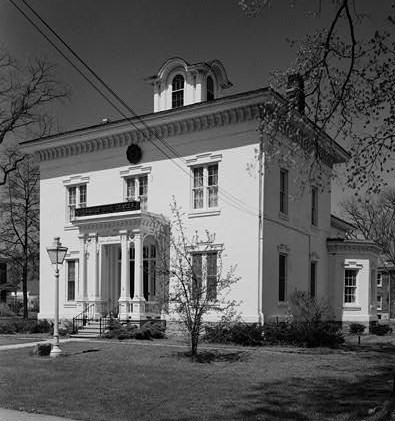

- Location within New York Location within the United States
- Location: 314 Second St., Liverpool, New York
- Coordinates: 43°6′13″N 76°12′37″W
- Area: less than one acre
- Built: c. 1860
- Architectural style: Italianate
- NRHP reference No.: 90000693
- Added to NRHP: May 10, 1990

The Lucius Gleason House, also known as Liverpool Village Hall and as the Gleason Mansion, is a historic home located at Liverpool, Onondaga County, New York. It was built about 1860, and is a large two-story, Italianate style, stuccoed brick dwelling. It has a telescoping plan with a two-story, hip roofed main block; followed by a smaller two-story, gable roofed wing; and a 1 1/2-story gabled appendage. The Gleason Mansion is now home to the Liverpool Village Museum and Historian's office. Operated by the Liverpool Historical Association, the museum features changing exhibits about local history.

It was listed on the National Register of Historic Places in 1990.
