= Colorado Salt Works =

- U.S. National Register of Historic Places
- Location within Colorado
- Location: 3858 U.S. Highway 285, Park County, Colorado near Hartsel, Colorado
- Area: 33 acres (13 ha)
- Built: 1866
- Built by: Charles L. Hall
- NRHP reference No.: 01000033
- Added to NRHP: February 2, 2001

The Colorado Salt Works, on Salt Works Ranch in Park County, Colorado near Hartsel, Colorado, is a site where salt springs flow and were used in salt harvesting in the late 1860s. The site was listed on the National Register of Historic Places in 2001.

The salt works were established in 1862, by Charles L. Hall, who bought out a small operation nearby and expanded production in new buildings in 1866. The expansion was funded by a partnership, Rollins, Lane and Hall, which brought in investors George W. Lane and John Quincy Adams Rollins.

The Kettle House (1866) is a two-story L-shaped building with a 50 feet (15 m) chimney, which held large pans of No. 12 iron and boiler iron, iron kettles, and drying and storage areas. It was fitted out with 18 boiling kettles, each 4 feet (1.2 m) in diameter, weighing more than .5 short tons (450 kg) and costing $1,500 each, delivered.

The Salt Works Barn (c.1866), similar in appearance, is a second contributing building on the site.

It was deemed significant as

...a rare, perhaps only, surviving example of an 1860s kettle and pan salt production facility in the United States. Salt was in high demand in that era as an element used in processing gold ores, and also for domestic and agricultural uses. Before the railroads arrived, salt had to be shipped overland by wagon from Missouri and brought prices as high as seven cents per pound in Denver and eight cents per pound in Central City. A barrel of salt sold for forty to fifty dollars and "a salt well was then was as good as a gulch mine." While other salt springs existed in the state, the Colorado Salt Works was the only site ever improved with the erection of a salt works.

It has been thought to be only the second manufacturing facility established in Colorado, after a Denver-located cannon foundry. It produced about 50 short tons (45,000 kg) of salt per month in 1867. It operated, however, only until around 1870, due to cheaper salt arriving by railroads to the state, relatively high and increasing costs of operation (including because timber used as fuel ran out in the area), and litigation among owners.

The listing included two contributing buildings.

The Salt Works Ranch as a whole is listed on the National Register and is a Colorado Centennial Ranch.

The Kettle House's tall chimney was long a landmark in South Park. It fell in the 1990s, "because it had been weakened by cattle rubbing against its base."

== See also ==
- Open-pan salt making
- Salt Museum, Syracuse, New York
