= Salt Works Ranch =

- U.S. National Register of Historic Places
- Location within Colorado
- Nearest city: Hartsel, Colorado
- Coordinates: 38°57′19″N 105°56′59″W
- Area: 128 acres (0.52 km^{2})
- Built: 1862
- Architectural style: Second Empire, Log cabin
- MPS: Ranching Resources of South Park, Colorado
- NRHP reference No.: 01000032
- Added to NRHP: February 2, 2001

The Salt Works Ranch, at 3858 U.S. Route 285 in Park County, Colorado near Hartsel, Colorado, was founded in 1862. The land is unusual for the presence of saline springs. It was listed on the National Register of Historic Places in 2001.

The ranch includes the Colorado Salt Works, which is separately listed on the National Register, and is crossed by U.S. Highway 285 and by the 1879 railroad grade of the Denver South Park & Pacific.

The listed area includes 17 contributing buildings, two contributing structures, and a contributing site, on 128 acres (0.52 km^{2}).

The main ranch house was built in 1872; it has elements of Second Empire style.

A number of homestead log cabins, some moved from elsewhere to serve as quarters for ranch hands, survive on the property.

The property has senior water rights used for hay meadows. In the same family for 140 years, it has been designated a Colorado Centennial Ranch by the Colorado Historical Society.
