= Salt Museum (Liverpool, New York) =

Museum detailing the salt industry

Coordinates: 43°5′59″N 76°12′25″W

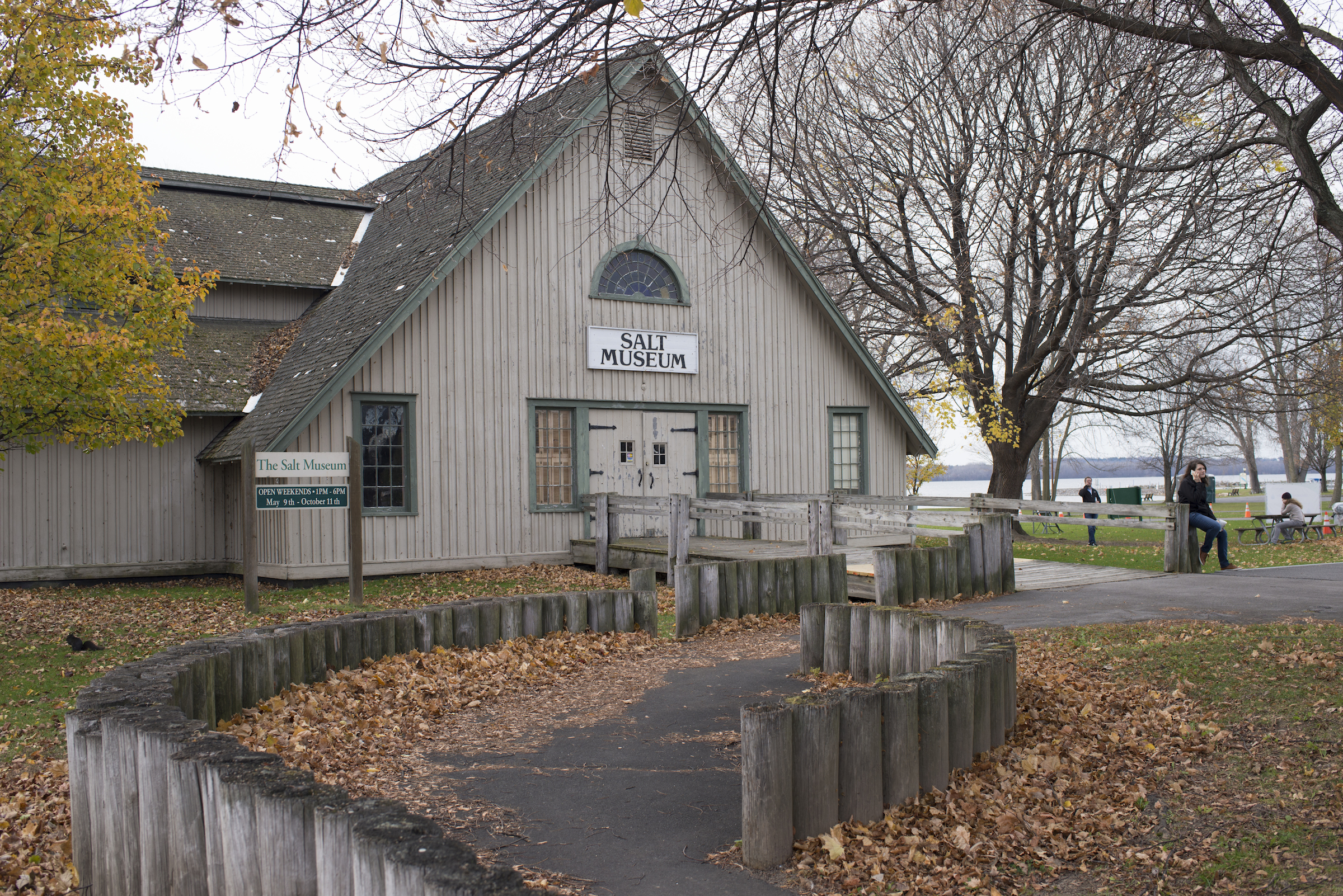
- Location: 6790 Onondaga Lake Parkway, Liverpool, New York

The Salt Museum near the shore of Onondaga Lake in Liverpool, New York is a museum explaining the salt industry created from salt springs in the Syracuse, New York area. The southern end of the lake was once known as the Onondaga Salt Reservation.

The building that houses the museum was built in the 1930s and is believed to be built from wood used in former salt factories.

The Erie Canal hastened and expanded the development of the salt industry and the city of Syracuse.

== See also ==
- Colorado Salt Works, another salt spring, listed on the National Register of Historic Places
