= Liverpool Cemetery =

Historic cemetery in New York, United States

- U.S. National Register of Historic Places
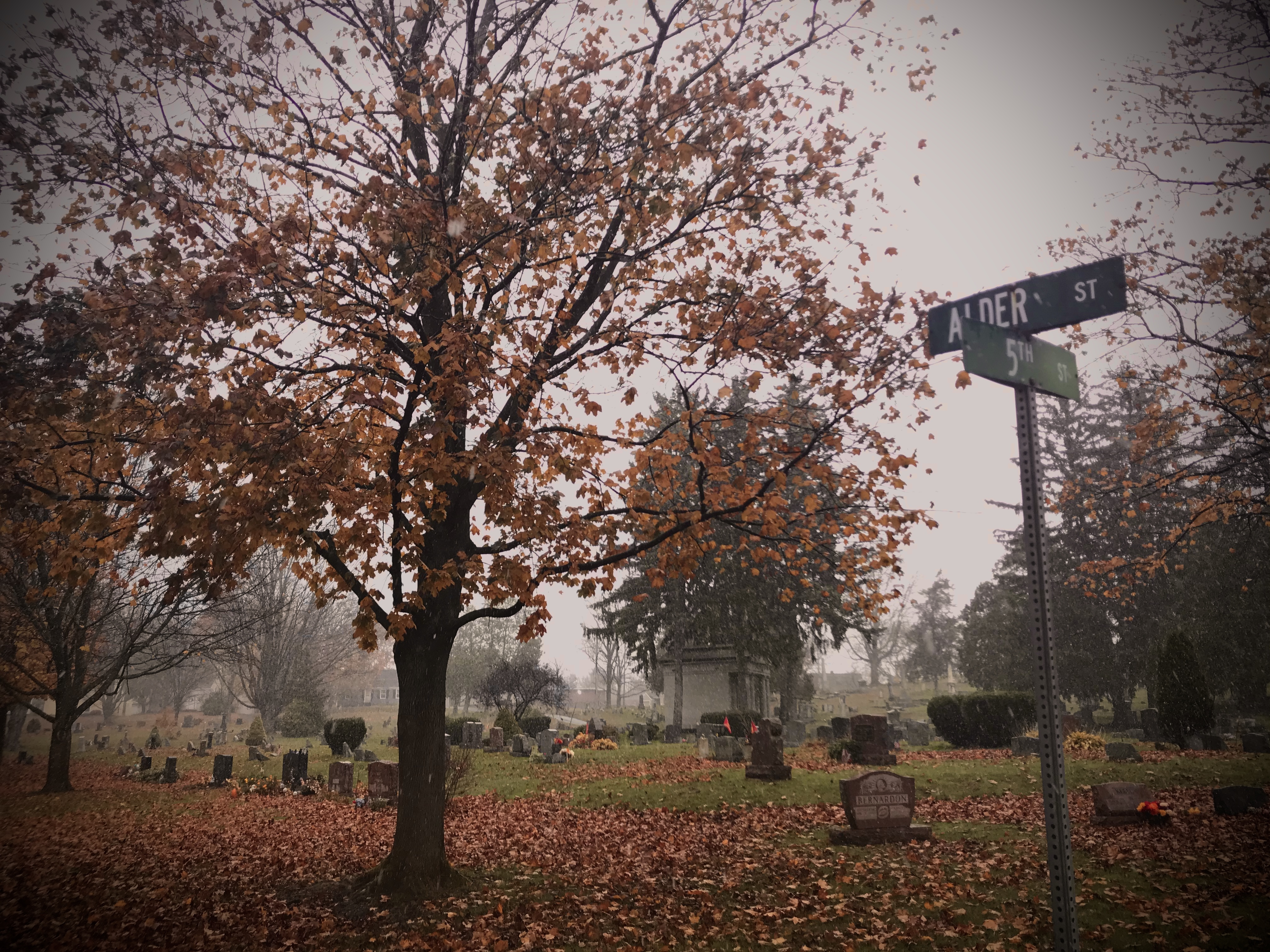
- Liverpool cemetery in fall 2019

- Location within New York Location within the United States
- Location: 225 6th St., Liverpool, New York
- Coordinates: 43°06′34″N 76°12′35″W
- Area: 5.52 acres (2.23 ha)
- Built: c. 1846
- Architectural style: Neoclassical Revival
- NRHP reference No.: 15000267
- Added to NRHP: May 26, 2015

Liverpool Cemetery is a historic cemetery located at Liverpool, Onondaga County, New York, United States. It was established about 1846, and remains an active burial ground containing approximately 3,600 burials. It is notable for the O’Neill family mausoleum, a large granite and marble early-20th century Neoclassical Revival building.

It was listed on the National Register of Historic Places in 2015.

== Gallery ==
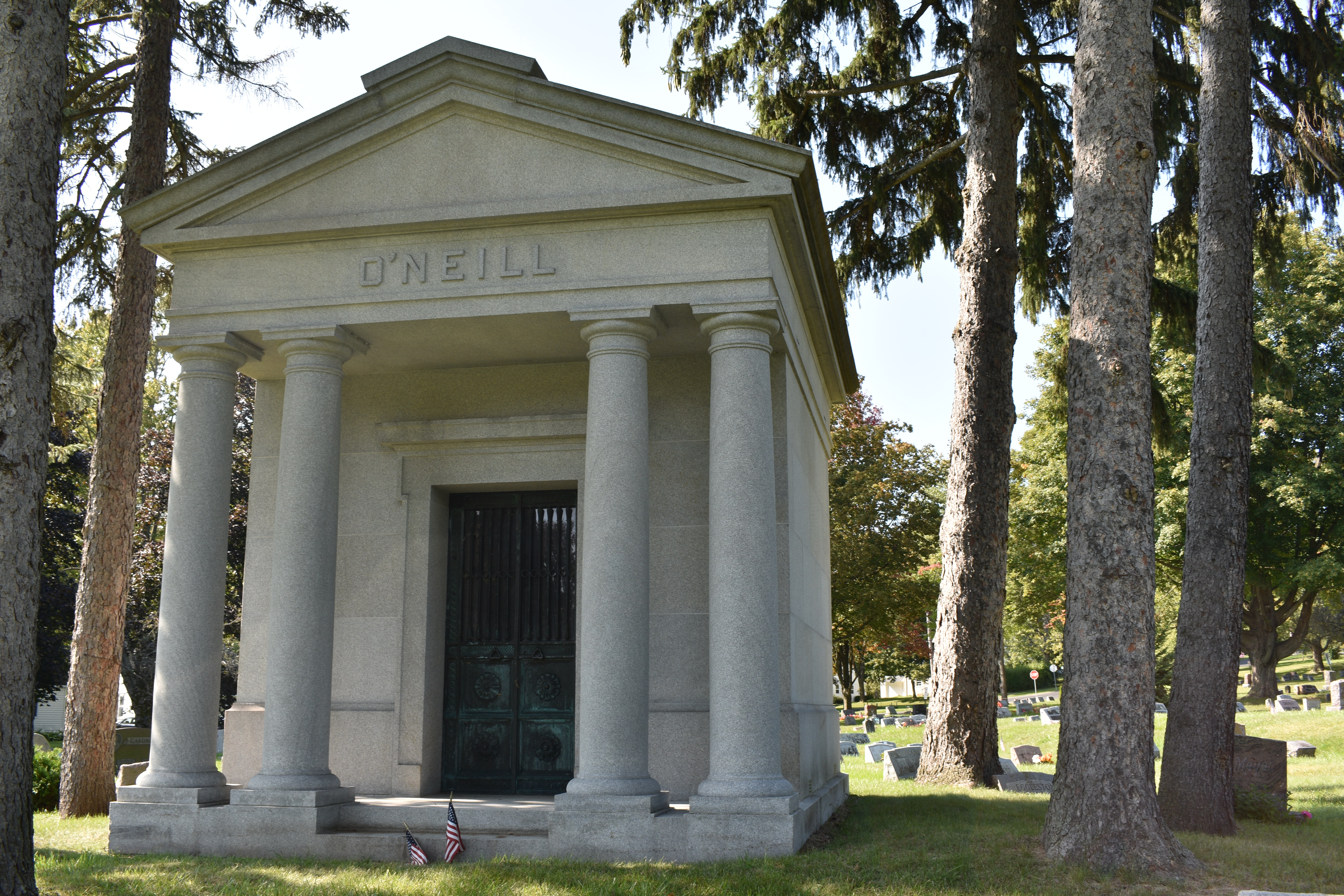
The O’Neill family mausoleum, located in the Liverpool Cemetery

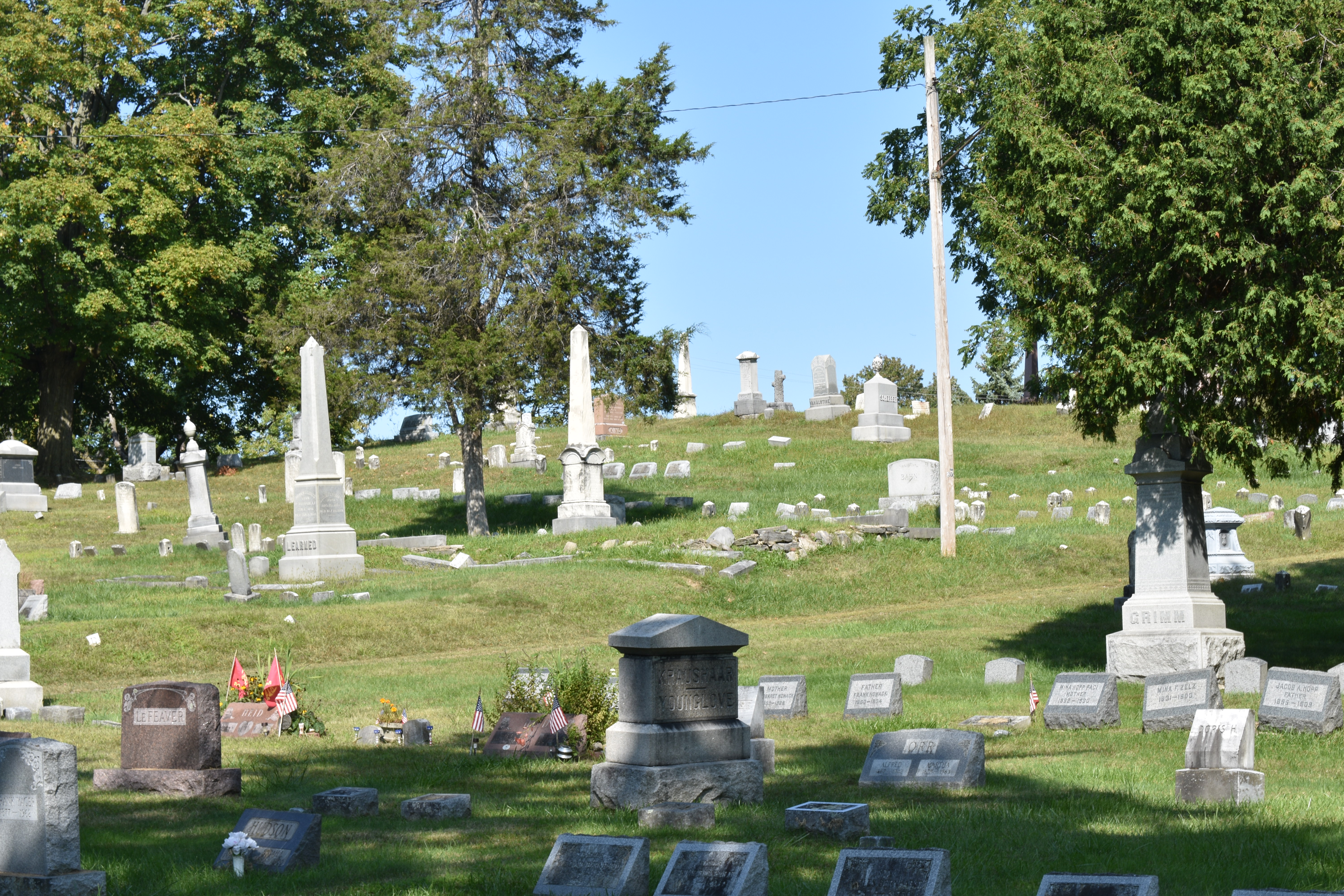
View of more graves located in the Liverpool Cemetery

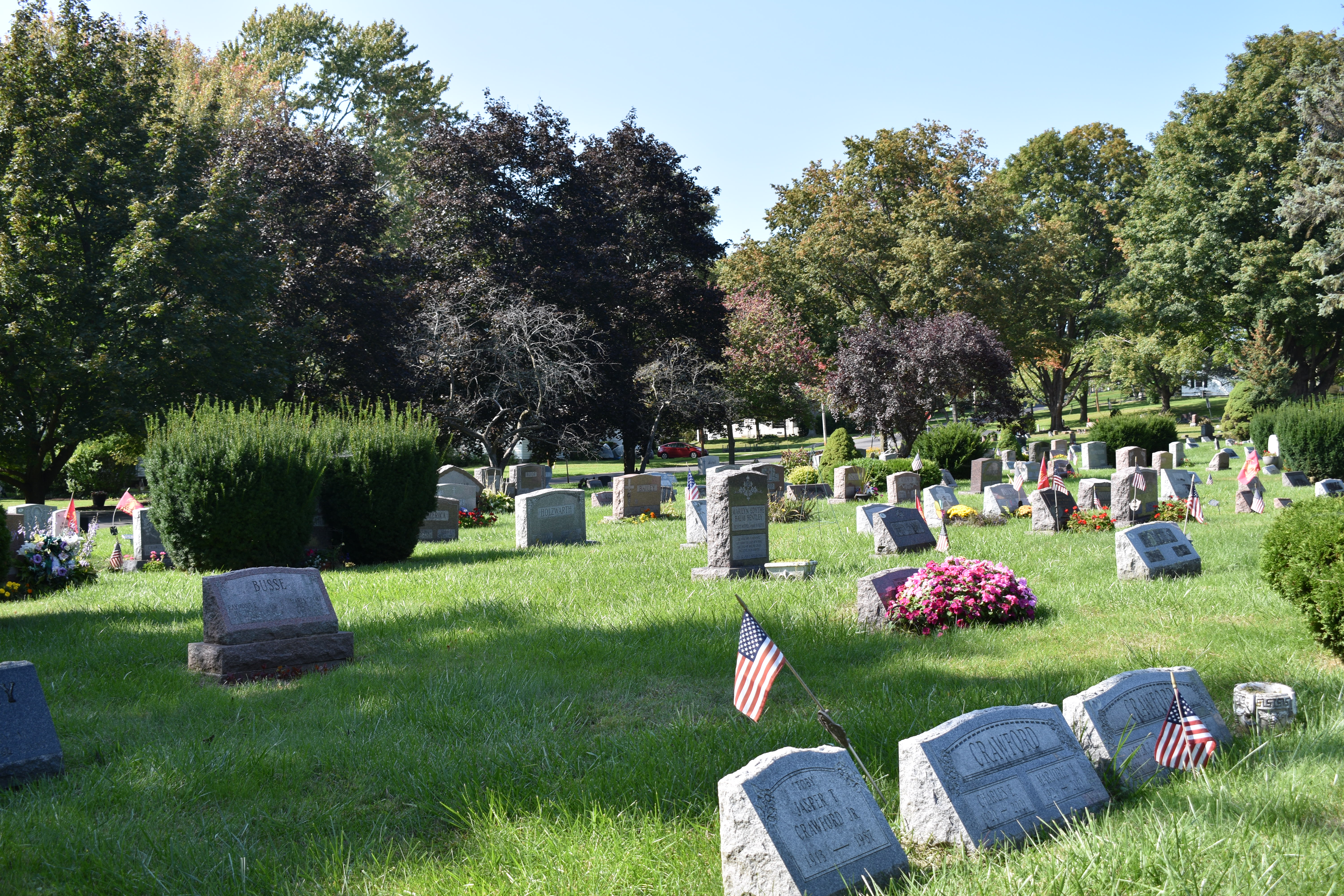
View of graves located in the Liverpool Cemetery
