= Adam Fullerton =

American lacrosse player (born 1985)

Personal information
- Nationality: American
- Born: February 6, 1985 (age 41) Liverpool, New York, U.S.
- Height: 6 ft 0 in (183 cm)
- Weight: 190 lb (86 kg; 13 st 8 lb)

Sport
- Position: Goaltender (field)
- Shoots: Left
- MLL team Former teams: Ohio Machine; Florida Launch; Denver Outlaws; Rochester Rattlers
- Former NCAA team: United States Military Academy
- Pro career: 2008–

Adam Fullerton (born February 6, 1985, in Liverpool, New York) is an American lacrosse player. He is currently a member of the Denver Outlaws in Major League Lacrosse Fullerton is best known as a field lacrosse goaltender.

== Early years ==
Fullerton, a field lacrosse goaltender, began playing high school lacrosse for Liverpool High School. At Liverpool High School, Fullerton was named team captain for Liverpool and became second team all league and honorable mention All-Central New York.

== College career ==
After high school, Fullerton enrolled at West Point, and set records as Army's goalkeeper his freshman year. He started after the first string senior goal-keeper went down with an injury. He played in all 17 games and started 12 of them, ranking 18th in the nation for save percentage with a (.576). He finished second in the Patriot League in save percentage and third in goals-against average.

Fullerton set the school record for longest consecutive winning streak by a freshman goalie and longest consecutive winning streak at the beginning of a career at seven. His eight wins was one short of school's plebe record. He was third on the squad in ground balls with 40.

Fullerton suffered his first collegiate loss against Duke. He recorded 13 saves against Air Force, then he improved upon that mark in regular-season finale with career-high 14 saves at Ohio State. Fullerton picked up four ground balls at Colgate and bettered that career mark with six grounders in Patriot League semifinal win over Bucknell. He recorded win at Holy Cross in relief of starter Matt Darak. Fullerton became the first plebe goalie to start an NCAA Tournament game since George Slabowski in 1981. He was also the first plebe goalie to lead the squad in goals-against average and save percentage since Rick Aguilar in 1991.

== MLL career ==
Fullerton was the first goalie selected, when he was selected with the third-round selection (28th overall) by the Rochester Rattlers in Major League Lacrosse in the 2008 MLL Collegiate Draft. After being drafted by Rochester, Fullerton was picked up by Denver before the 2009 season. He was selected as one of the goalies on the US National team that recently won gold at the World Lacrosse Championship. He was one of the eight goalies invited to try out for the team. In 2011, Fullerton's professional career was put on halt when he received word of his deployment to Afghanistan and served as First Lieutenant in the United States Army.

Prior to the 2014 season, Fullerton was traded by the Denver Outlaws to the Florida Launch, in exchange for Roy Lang. Fullerton played in seven games for the Launch in 2014, saving 31 shots over 135 minutes of play. So far in 2015, Fullerton has appeared in 4 games with a GAA of 14.04 and a SV% of 51.7 (.571)

During the 2015 MLL season, Fullerton spent most of the season backing up Florida Launch starting goaltender, Brett Queener. With three games remaining in the Florida Launch season, it was discovered Fullerton suffered from a torn meniscus in his knee, requiring him to miss the remainder of the season.

== Personal life ==
His identical twin brother, Patrick Fullerton played attack with Adam at West Point.

Fullerton was a 1st Lieutenant and was promoted to Captain in the United States Army causing him to miss one year of his MLL Career.

Fullerton graduated West Point with a degree in Leadership Management with a minor in Environmental Engineering.

Fullerton spent a year tour in Afghanistan serving in the U.S. army in 2011.

Fullerton is married to Brea Thomas Fullerton, founder and CEO of Shinery, a non-toxic jewelry care line.

== Statistics ==
=== MLL ===
		Regular Season
Season	Team	GP	W	L	GAA	SV	GB
2009	Denver	3	0	1	12.78	.529	2
2010	Denver	4	0	1	11.95	.547	1
2011	Denver	1	1	0	19.54	.286	3
2012	Denver	2	0	0	14.23	.571	1
2014	Florida	7	0	1	13.71	.500	N/A
2015	Florida	4	0	3	14.04	.517	N/A
MLL Totals		20	1	6	14.38	.492	7
