= Liverpool, New York =

Village in New York, United States

- Village
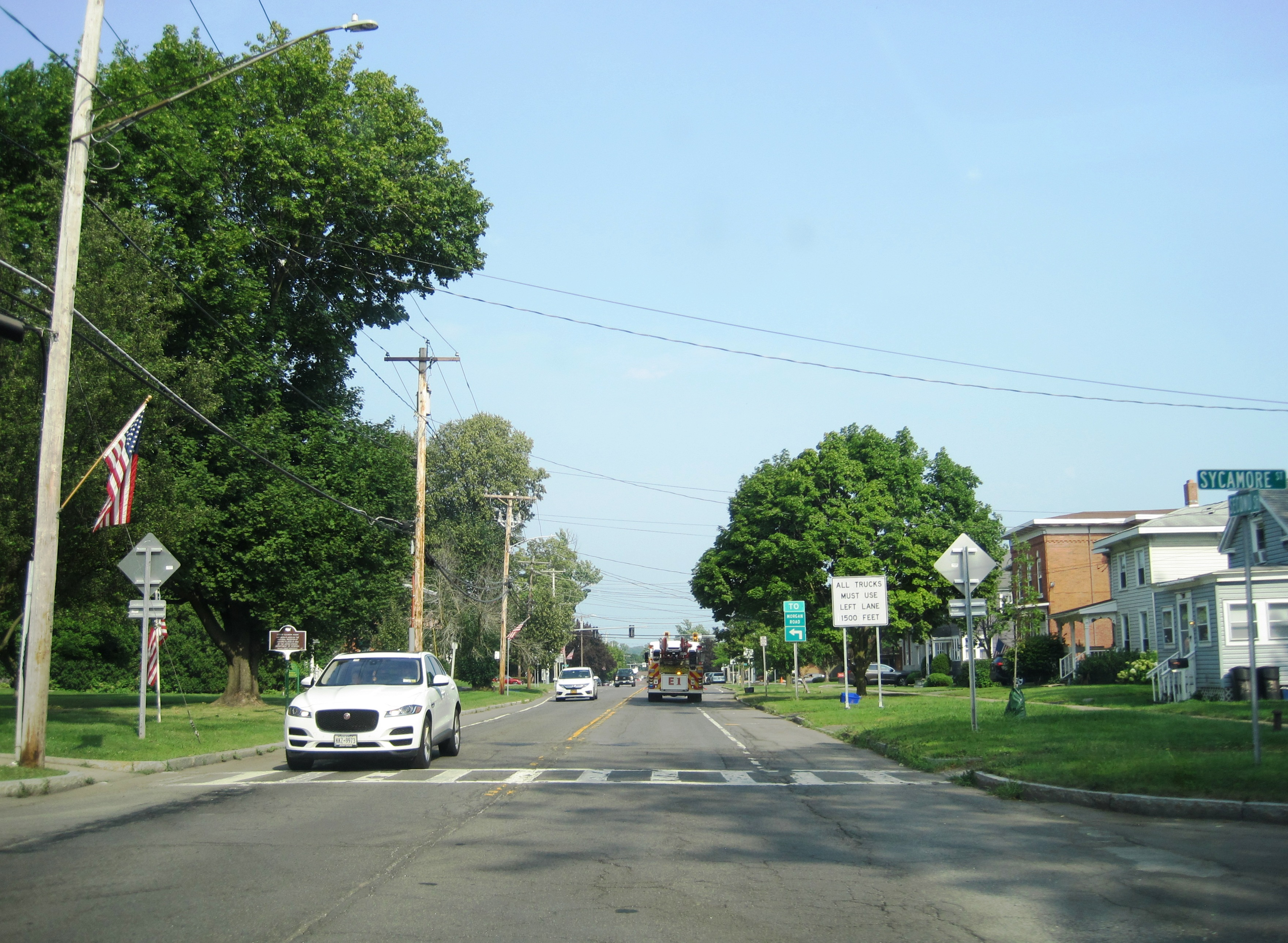
- Looking east along NY 370 (Second Street) in Liverpool in 2023

- Seal

- Location in Onondaga County and New York state
- Coordinates: 43°6′12″N 76°12′24″W
- Country: United States
- State: New York
- County: Onondaga

Government
  - Mayor: Stacy L. Finney

Area
  - Total: 0.75 sq mi (1.95 km^{2})
  - Land: 0.75 sq mi (1.95 km^{2})
  - Water: 0 sq mi (0.00 km^{2})
- Elevation: 420 ft (128 m)

Population (2020)
  - Total: 2,242
  - Density: 2,983.4/sq mi (1,151.89/km^{2})
- Time zone: UTC-5 (Eastern (EST))
  - Summer (DST): UTC-4 (EDT)
- ZIP codes: 13088-13090
- Area code: 315
- FIPS code: 36-42884
- GNIS feature ID: 0955742
- Website: villageofliverpool.org

Liverpool is a lakeside village in Onondaga County, New York, United States. As of the 2020 census, the population was 2,242. The name was adopted from the city of Liverpool in the United Kingdom. The village is on Onondaga Lake, in the western part of the town of Salina and is northwest of Syracuse, of which it is a suburb.

== History ==
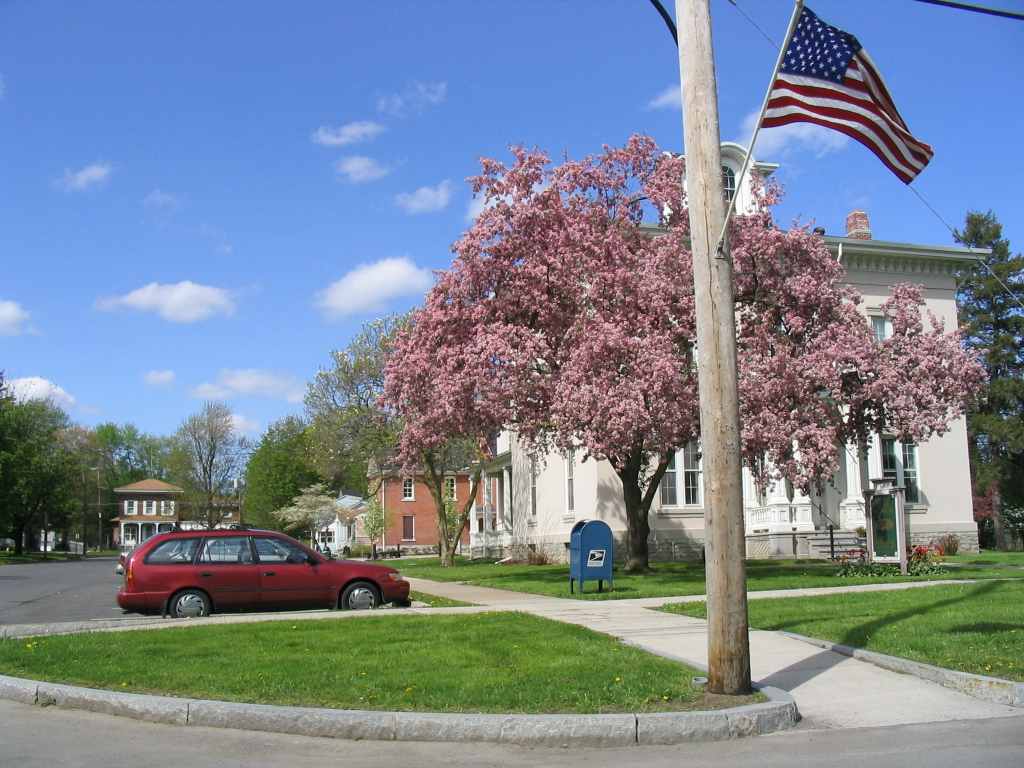
Liverpool in 2004

The area was originally inhabited by the Iroquois, starting in the 16th century. In the mid-17th century, Canadian French Jesuits visited the area, setting up missions. These were not permanent, however. An example of these missions is Sainte Marie among the Iroquois, on Onondaga Lake just outside the village. Once the (Erie Canal) and (Oswego Canal) were built, the area was settled by Irish canal workers, Yankee settlers, and, later, German immigrants. The early recorded name for the village was "Little Ireland".

The Lucius Gleason House and Liverpool Cemetery are listed on the National Register of Historic Places.

=== Erie Canal and salt ===
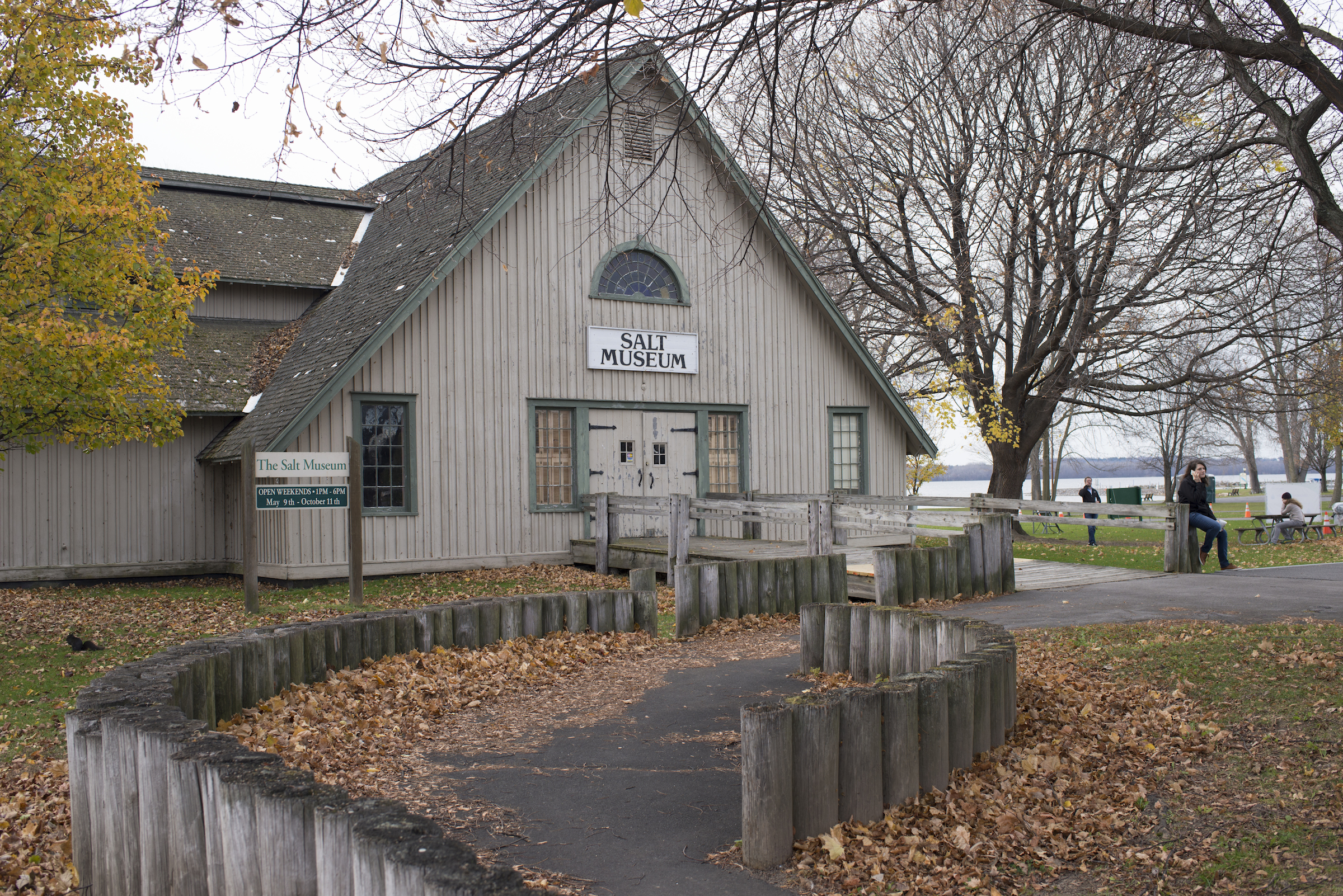
The Salt Museum on the shore of Onondaga Lake in 2015

Early industries included several salt works in the 19th century and a sawmill. Liverpool played an important role in the salt industry on the shores of Onondaga Lake. A history of the area's salt mining can be found at the Salt Museum.

=== Village incorporated ===
The New York State surveyor general laid out the streets in the village, changed its name from "Little Ireland" to "Liverpool", and had it incorporated on April 20, 1830. It was renamed after the city of Liverpool in England, most likely because it also produced salt and village leaders wanted to use the name recognition of another famous salt-producing region; coincidentally, 15 years later, the Great Famine caused so many people to sail from Ireland to England for a new life in Liverpool that the city gained the nickname "Little Ireland" and its demographic makeup remains the most overwhelmingly Irish of any community in the United Kingdom.

=== Industry ===
The hotel business was booming. George Ingersoll built the Globe Hotel. Liverpool was also a cigar manufacturing center during the 1890s. In 1918, the Oswego Canal was closed. Onondaga Lake Park, established in 1931, is now the location of much of the old canal bed.

== Geography ==
Liverpool is at 43°6′21″N 76°12′34″W (43.105967, -76.209564). It takes up most of the northeastern bank of Onondaga Lake. Onondaga Lake Park is one of the most prominent locales in Liverpool, known for its several trams that travel the length of the park. It attracts over one million visitors each year.

According to the United States Census Bureau, the village has an area of 0.8 square miles (2.1 km^{2}), all land.

New York State Route 370 is an east–west highway that runs through the village. The New York State Thruway (Interstate 90) passes through the northern part of the village.

Liverpool is also home to a Lockheed Martin factory.

== Onondaga Lake Park ==
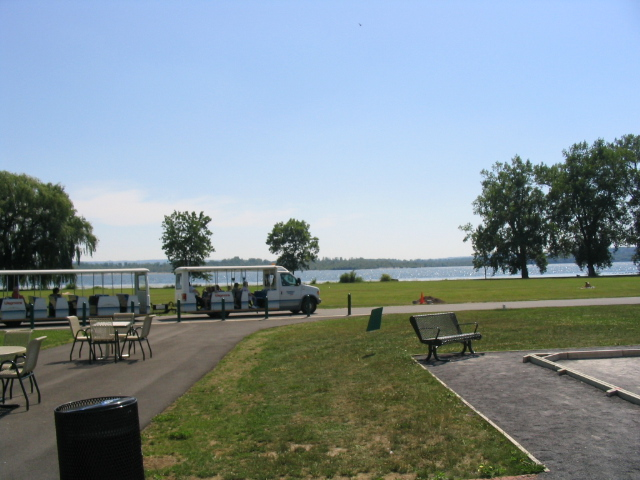
Onondaga Lake Park

Onondaga Lake Park is a county park on the eastern shore of Onondaga Lake outside of Syracuse at 6790 Onondaga Lake Trail in Liverpool. The park is home to the Salt Museum and the East Shore Recreation Trail. Many people living in the area use the park for exercise.

== Demographics ==
Historical population
Census	Pop.	Note	%±
1870	1,555		—
1880	1,350		−13.2%
1890	1,284		−4.9%
1900	1,133		−11.8%
1910	1,388		22.5%
1920	1,831		31.9%
1930	2,244		22.6%
1940	2,500		11.4%
1950	2,933		17.3%
1960	3,487		18.9%
1970	3,307		−5.2%
1980	2,849		−13.8%
1990	2,624		−7.9%
2000	2,505		−4.5%
2010	2,347		−6.3%
2020	2,242		−4.5%
U.S. Decennial Census

=== 2020 census ===
As of the 2020 census, Liverpool had a population of 2,242. The median age was 44.0 years. 14.5% of residents were under the age of 18 and 24.7% of residents were 65 years of age or older. For every 100 females there were 90.6 males, and for every 100 females age 18 and over there were 92.2 males age 18 and over.

100.0% of residents lived in urban areas, while 0.0% lived in rural areas.

There were 1,129 households in Liverpool, of which 20.3% had children under the age of 18 living in them. Of all households, 36.2% were married-couple households, 21.1% were households with a male householder and no spouse or partner present, and 34.2% were households with a female householder and no spouse or partner present. About 40.2% of all households were made up of individuals and 14.7% had someone living alone who was 65 years of age or older.

There were 1,250 housing units, of which 9.7% were vacant. The homeowner vacancy rate was 1.2% and the rental vacancy rate was 5.0%.

Racial composition as of the 2020 census
Race	Number	Percent
White	2,039	90.9%
Black or African American	57	2.5%
American Indian and Alaska Native	12	0.5%
Asian	13	0.6%
Native Hawaiian and Other Pacific Islander	1	0.0%
Some other race	18	0.8%
Two or more races	102	4.5%
Hispanic or Latino (of any race)	76	3.4%

=== 2000 census ===
As of the 2000 census, there were 2,505 people, 1,154 households, and 641 families residing in the village. The population density was 3,321.9 inhabitants per square mile (1,282.6/km^{2}). There were 1,219 housing units at an average density of 1,616.5 per square mile (624.1/km^{2}). The racial makeup of the village was 95.93% White, 1.32% African American, 0.20% Native American, 1.28% Asian, 0.36% from other races, and 0.92% from two or more races. Hispanic or Latino of any race were 1.80% of the population.

There were 1,154 households, out of which 24.9% had children under the age of 18 living with them, 41.9% were married couples living together, 11.0% had a female householder with no husband present, and 44.4% were non-families. 36.7% of all households were made up of individuals, and 12.2% had someone living alone who was 65 years of age or older. The average household size was 2.16 and the average family size was 2.86.

In the village, the population was spread out, with 20.6% under the age of 18, 7.1% from 18 to 24, 30.2% from 25 to 44, 25.1% from 45 to 64, and 16.9% who were 65 years of age or older. The median age was 39 years. For every 100 females, there were 84.5 males. For every 100 females age 18 and over, there were 81.3 males.

The median income for a household in the village was $37,581, and the median income for a family was $45,179. Males had a median income of $40,426 versus $25,559 for females. The per capita income for the village was $22,344. About 10.8% of families and 11.6% of the population were below the poverty line, including 20.0% of those under age 18 and 6.1% of those age 65 or over.

== Popular Culture ==
The Netflix series Minimum Wage was filmed and takes place on First Street.

== Education ==
The school district is Liverpool Central School District.

== Notable people ==
- Tim Green, football player, broadcaster, and attorney
- Chris Gedney, football player
- Doug Heveron, NASCAR driver
- Josh Ford, soccer player
- Adam Fullerton, professional lacrosse player
- Jeorgio Kocevski, soccer player
- Chris Madden, retired ice hockey goaltender
- Donald R. Miller, New York State assemblyman
- Jack Smith, Special Counsel, Department of Justice
