= C. Hamilton Sanford =

Charles Hamilton Sanford
- Born: May 28, 1873; Cleveland, Ohio, United States
- Died: February 16, 1942 (aged 68); DeWitt, New York, United States
- Occupation(s): Automobile magnate, Business, Banker
- Spouse: Alice Durston Sanford
- Children: C. Hamilton Sanford, Jr. Durston Sanford; Adele Sanford
- Parent: Theodore S. Sanford & Arabella Fenton

Charles Hamilton Sanford (May 28, 1873 – February 16, 1942) was born in Cleveland, Ohio, and was president of the Syracuse Trust Company and co-founder of Sanford-Herbert Motor Truck Company in Syracuse, New York.

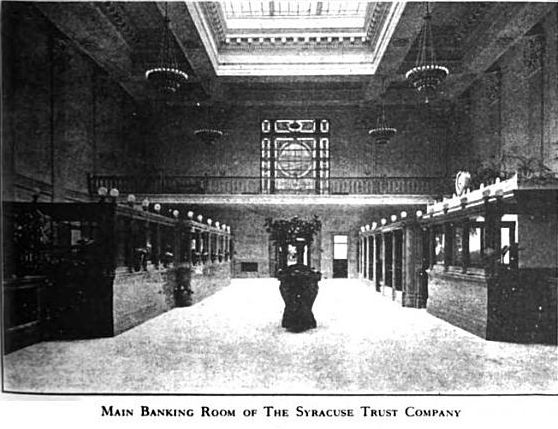
Syracuse Trust Company - interior - 1913

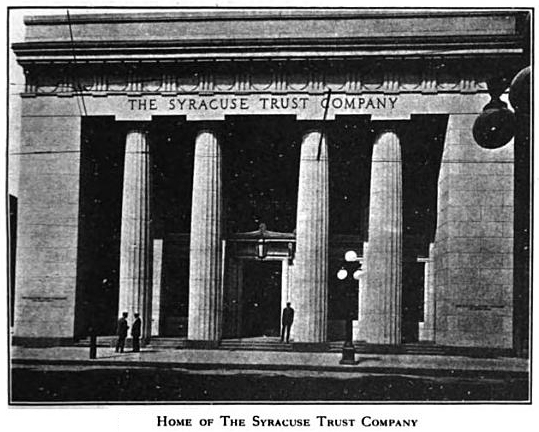
Syracuse Trust Company - Doric columns at 344 South Warren Street in Syracuse - 1913
