= Sanford-Herbert Motor Truck Company =

Defunct American motor vehicle manufacturer

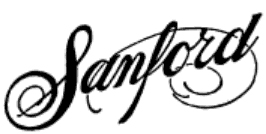
- Type: Truck Manufacturing
- Industry: Automotive
- Genre: Trucks
- Founded: 1909; 117 years ago
- Founder: Charles Hamilton Sanford (May 28, 1873 - February 16, 1942)
- Defunct: 1939; 87 years ago
- Headquarters: Syracuse, New York, United States
- Area served: United States
- Products: Trucks, Truck parts

The Sanford-Herbert Motor Truck Company (1909-1939) was a manufacturer of trucks in Syracuse, New York.

== History ==
The Sanford-Herbert Motor Truck Company was founded in 1909 and manufactured trucks in Syracuse for over 30 years until 1939.

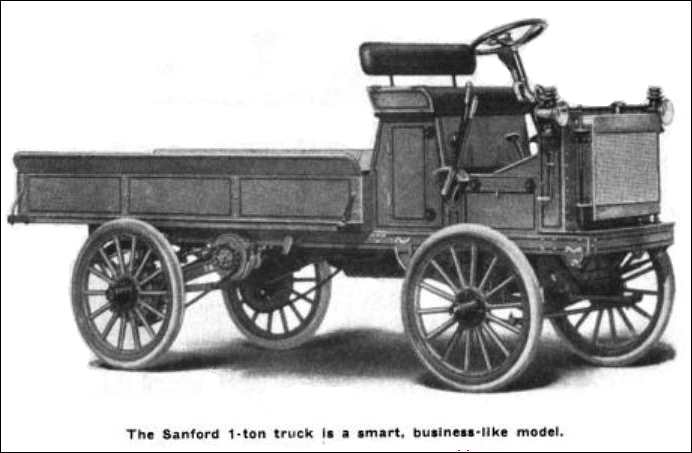
Sanford Motor Truck Company - 1912 one-ton, Model J

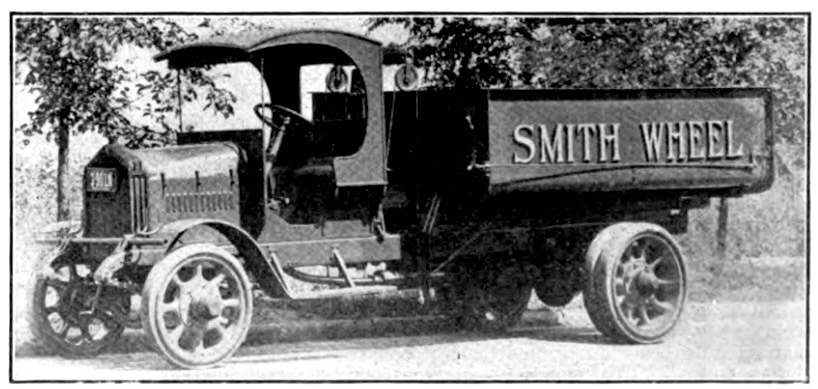
Sandford W-50 (1917-1925)

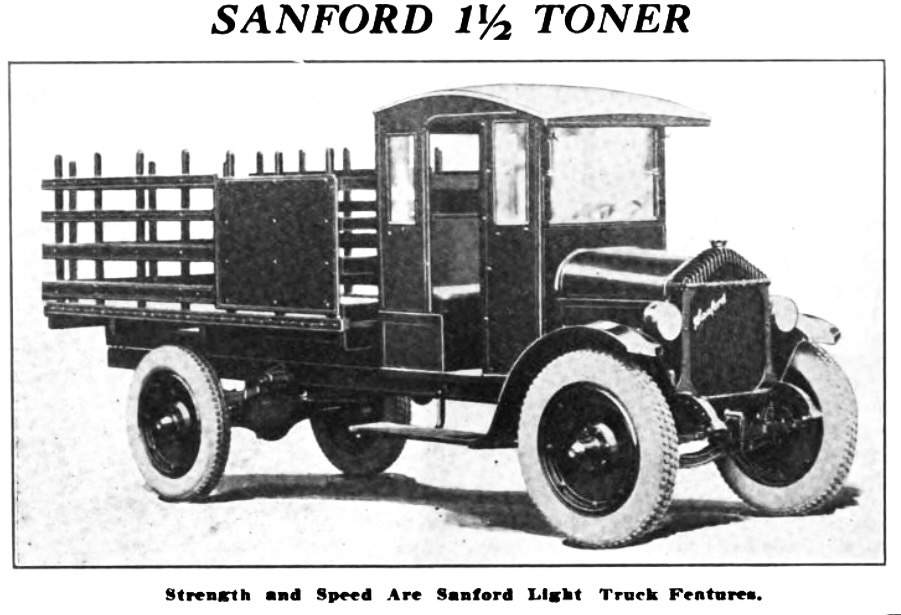
Sanford Model W 15 (1922-1925)

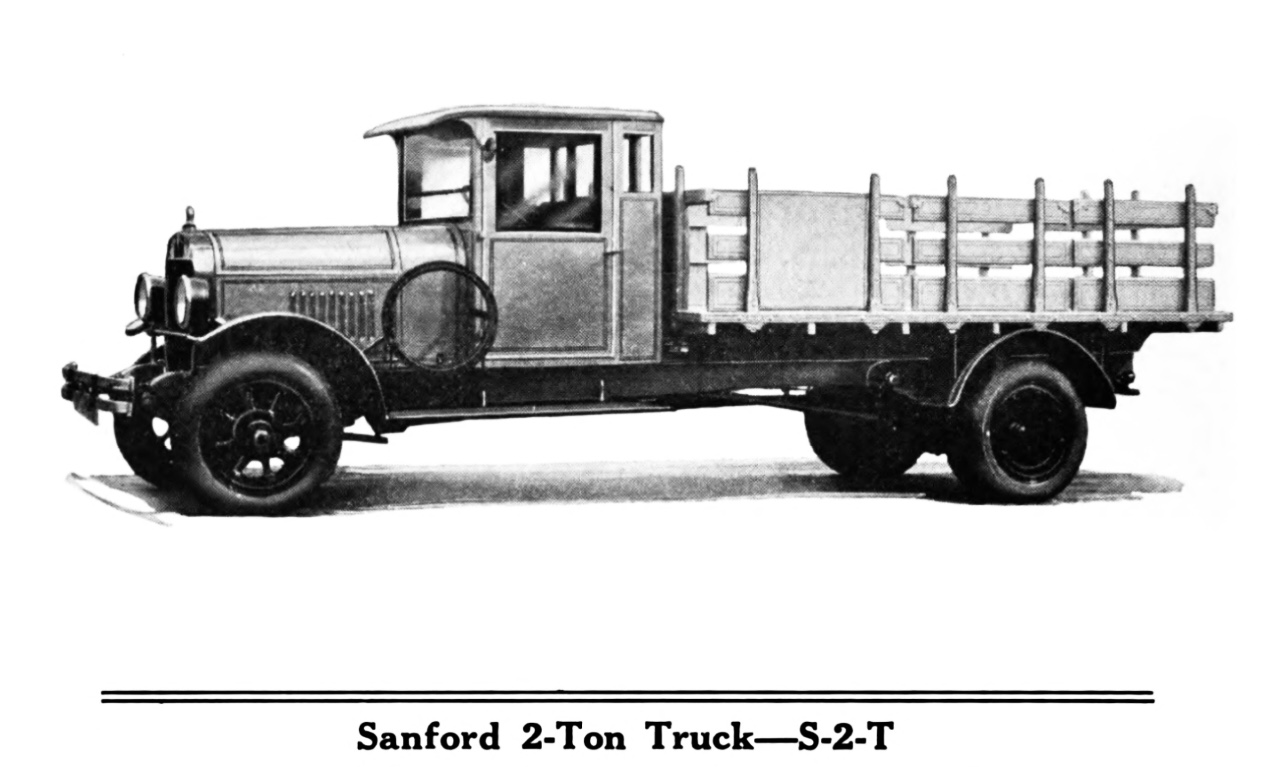
Sanford S-2-T (1928)

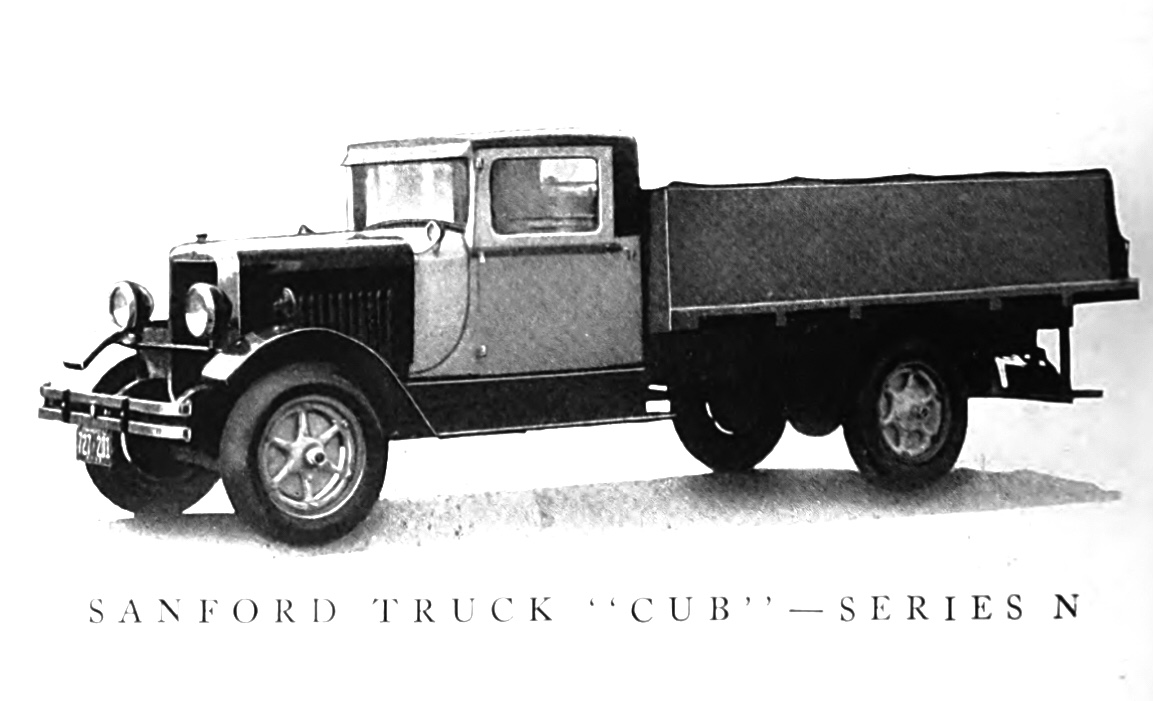
Sanford Cub Series N (1929)

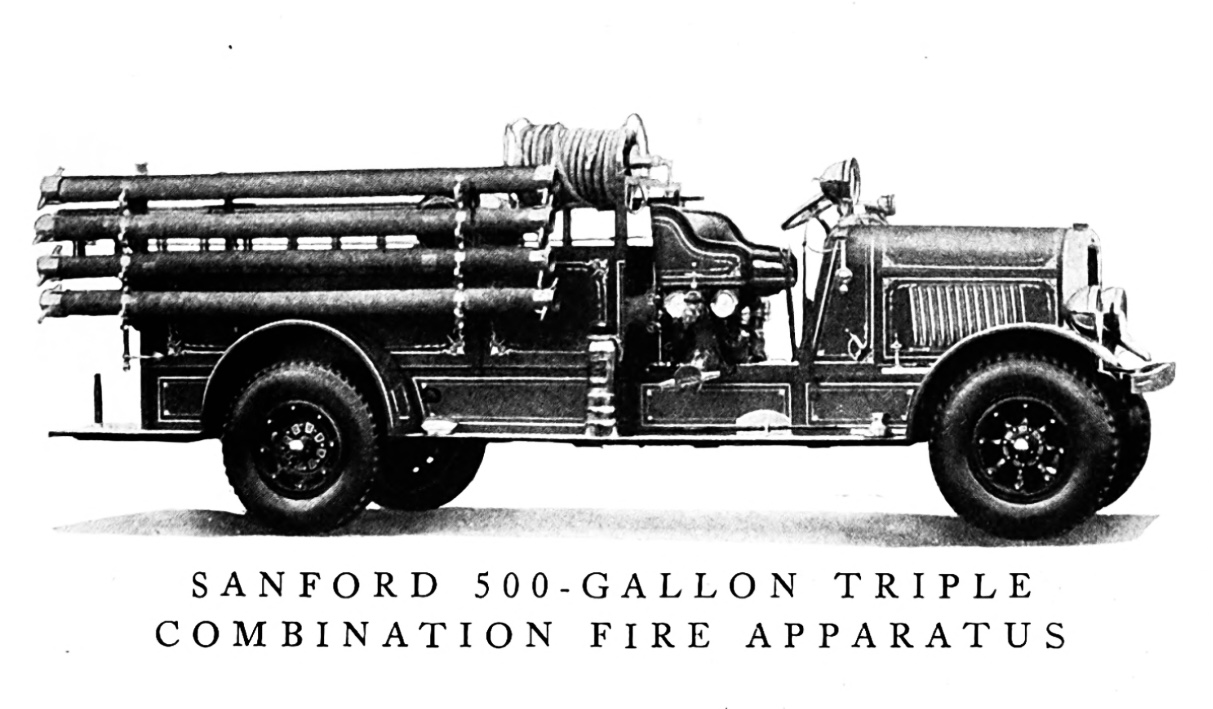
Sanford 500 Gallonen Triple Combination Fire Apparatus (1929)

== Advertisements ==
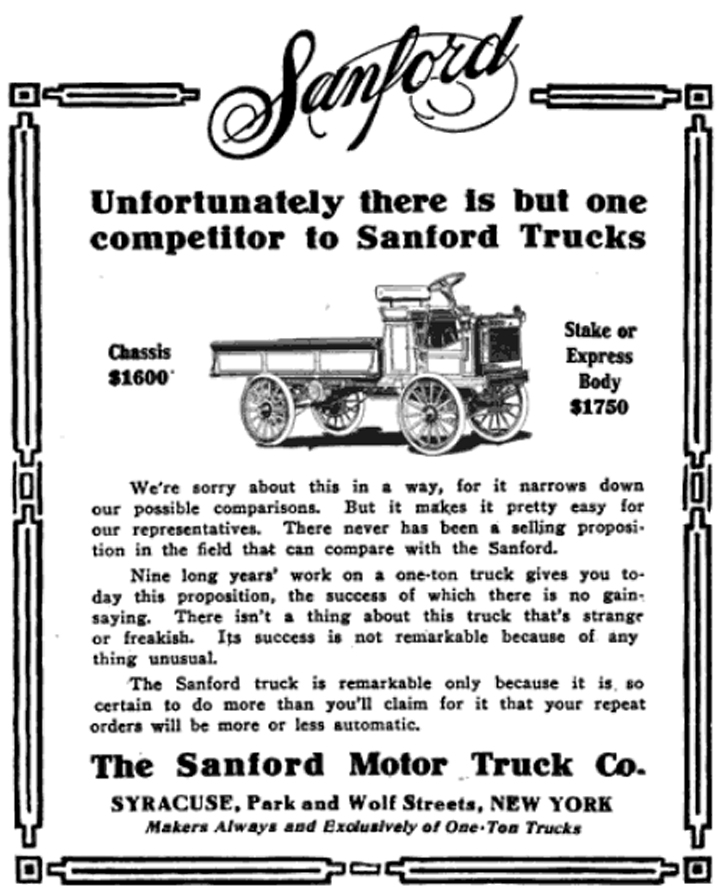
Sanford Motor Truck Company - Advertisement, Power Trucks - 1912

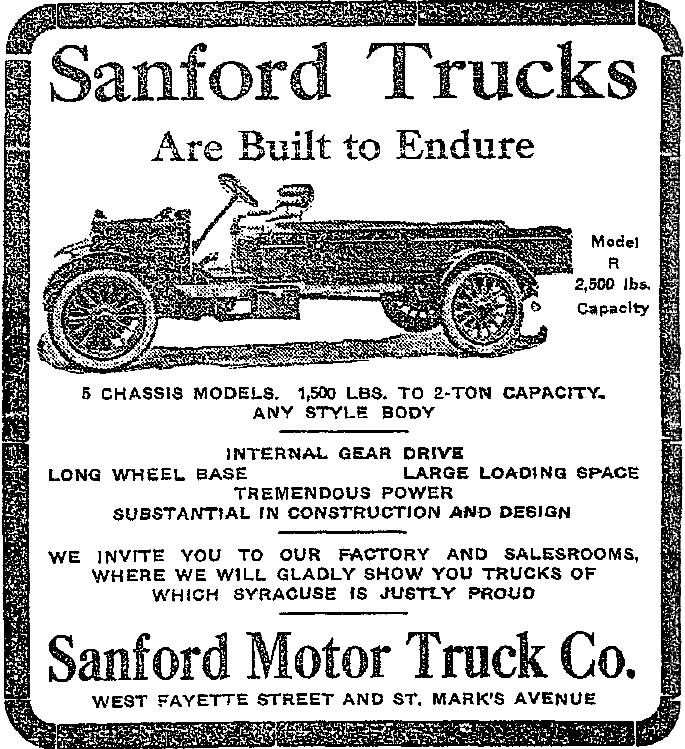
"Sanford Trucks - Are Built to Endure" - Syracuse Herald - April 30, 1916

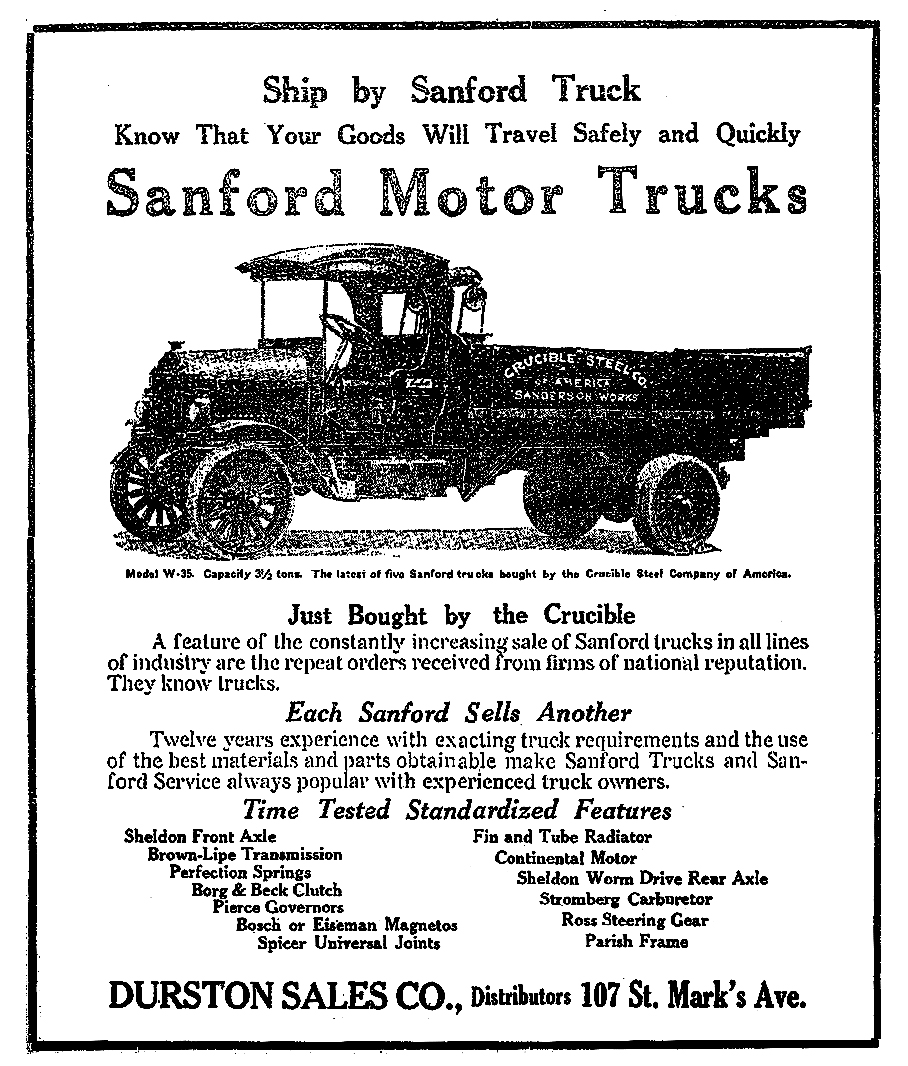
Sanford Motor Truck Company - Advertisement - Syracuse Herald - October 5, 1919

Year	Production	Model
1909		
1910		
1911		J
1912		J
1913		J, K, L
1914		K, L
1915		K, L
1916		K, L
1917	50	L, M, O, R, S, W-25, W-30, W-50
1918	141	W-25, W-30, W-50
1919	11	W-25, W-30, W-50
1920	66	W-25, W-30, W-50
1921	126	W-25, W-30, W-50
1922		W-15, W-25, W-30, W-50
1923		W-10 Greyhound, W-15, W-25, W-30, W-50
1924		W-10 Greyhound, W-15 fast freighter, W-25, W-30, W-50, W-35 contractors special
1925		W-10 Greyhound, W-15 fast freighter, W-25 cruiser, W-30, W-50, W-35 contractors special, W-35 titanic, W-20
1926		W6-12, W6-15, W6-20, W4-25, W4-35
1927		W6-12, W6-15, W6-20, W6-25, W4-25, W4-35
1928		S-2-T, A, N, F, 333, 345, 345CS, 635, 635 CS, 650, 659 CS
1929		fire truck, S, SE, A, AX, N, NO, F, FL, O, OCS, 333
1930		
1931		
1932		
1933		
1934		
1935		
1936		
1937		
1938		
1939		
