= H. A. Moyer (automobile) =

Defunct American motor vehicle manufacturer

H. A. Moyer, Maker of Fine Carriages and Automobiles
- All Roads Are Level To A Moyer

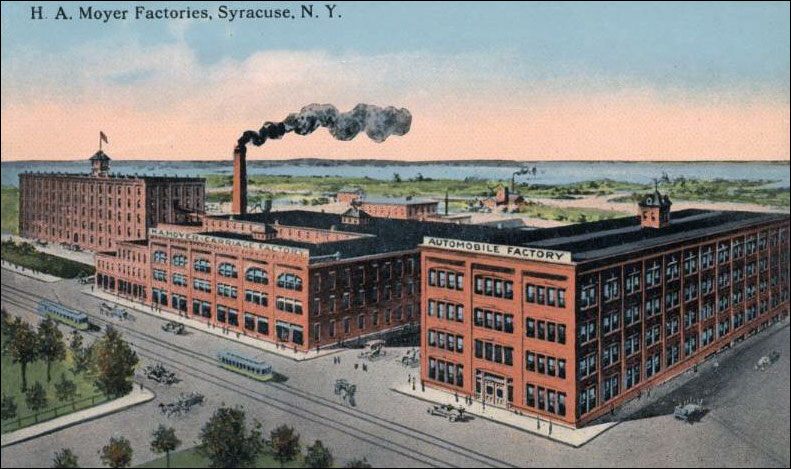
- 1915 Factory postcard
- Company type: Automobile Manufacturing
- Industry: Automotive
- Founded: 1909; 117 years ago
- Founder: Harvey A. Moyer (1853–1935)
- Defunct: 1915; 111 years ago
- Fate: Discontinued auto manufacturing.
- Headquarters: Syracuse, New York, United States
- Products: vehicles Automotive parts
- Parent: H. A. Moyer Carriage Company

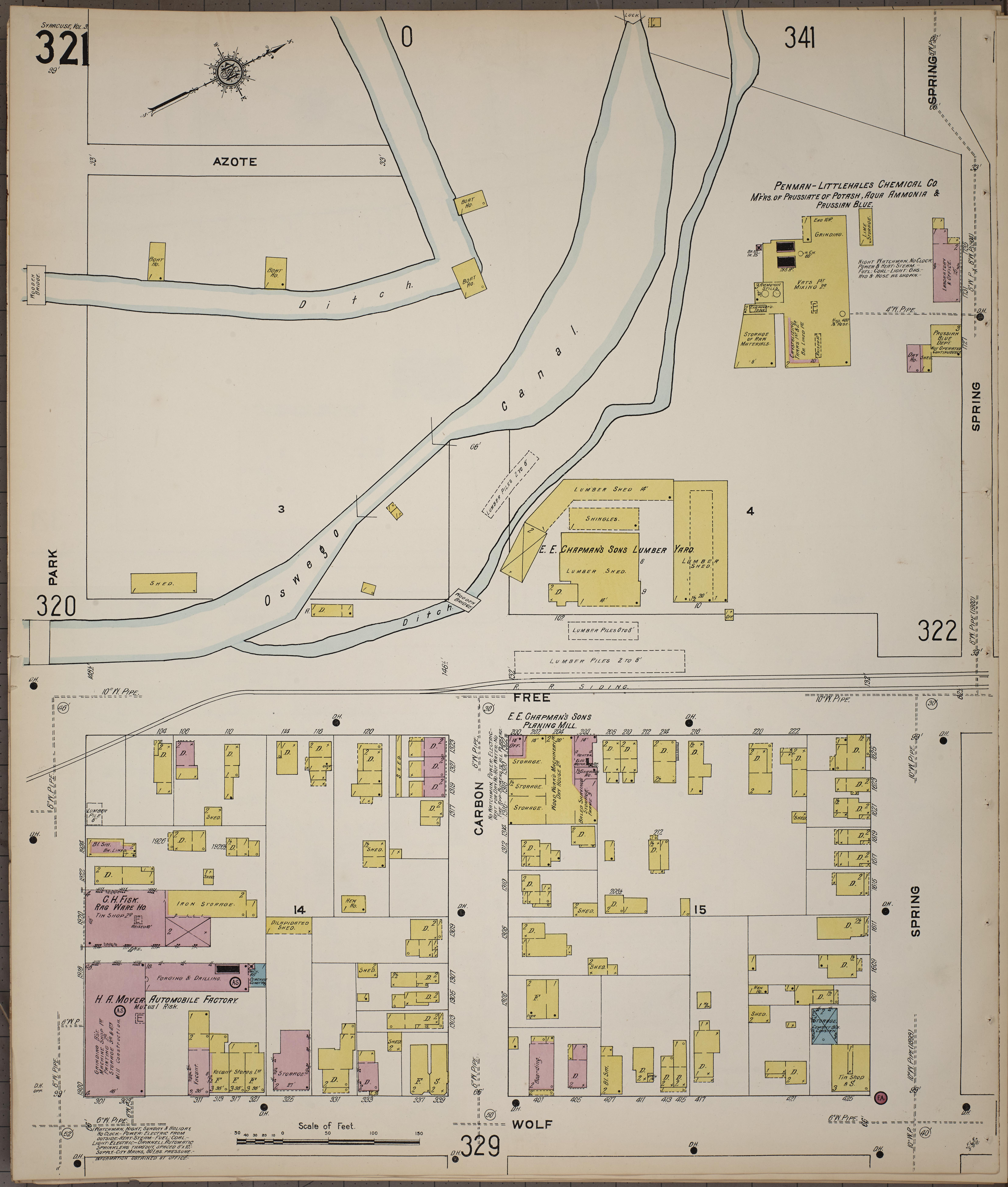
H. A. Moyer Automobile Factory (1911)

H. A. Moyer Automobile Company (1908–1915), a manufacturer of luxury automobiles in Syracuse, New York, was founded by Harvey A. Moyer (1853–1935) of Clay, New York.

== History ==
The company began business in 1876 in Cicero, New York, as H. A. Moyer Carriage Company. As the era of the horse-drawn carriage came to an end, Moyer switched assembly to motor vehicles, although he continued to produce carriages.

Moyer built large cars in the luxury $2,000 to $3,000 (equivalent to $103,661 in 2025) range. His engines had full-pressure lubrication and both four-cylinder and six-cylinder versions were available. Moyer intended to introduce a less expensive version for the 1916 model year, but he ran out of capital funds. By the end of 1915 he discontinued his automobile business, after the production of about 400 cars.

In 1916 Moyer incorporated as H. A. Moyer, Inc., and became a dealer for Stearns-Knight and Velie automobiles.

== Gallery ==
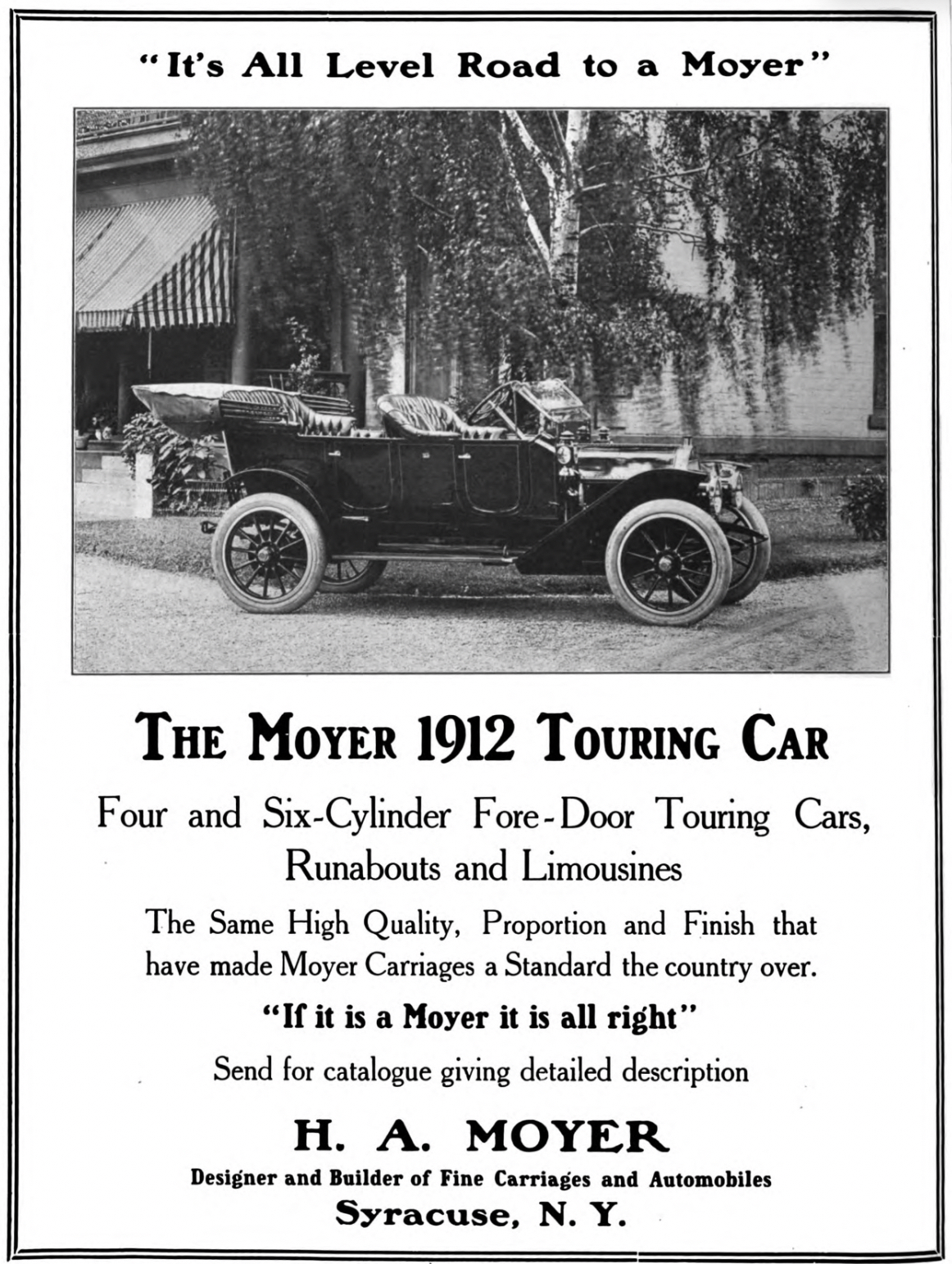
1911 Moyer Advertisement

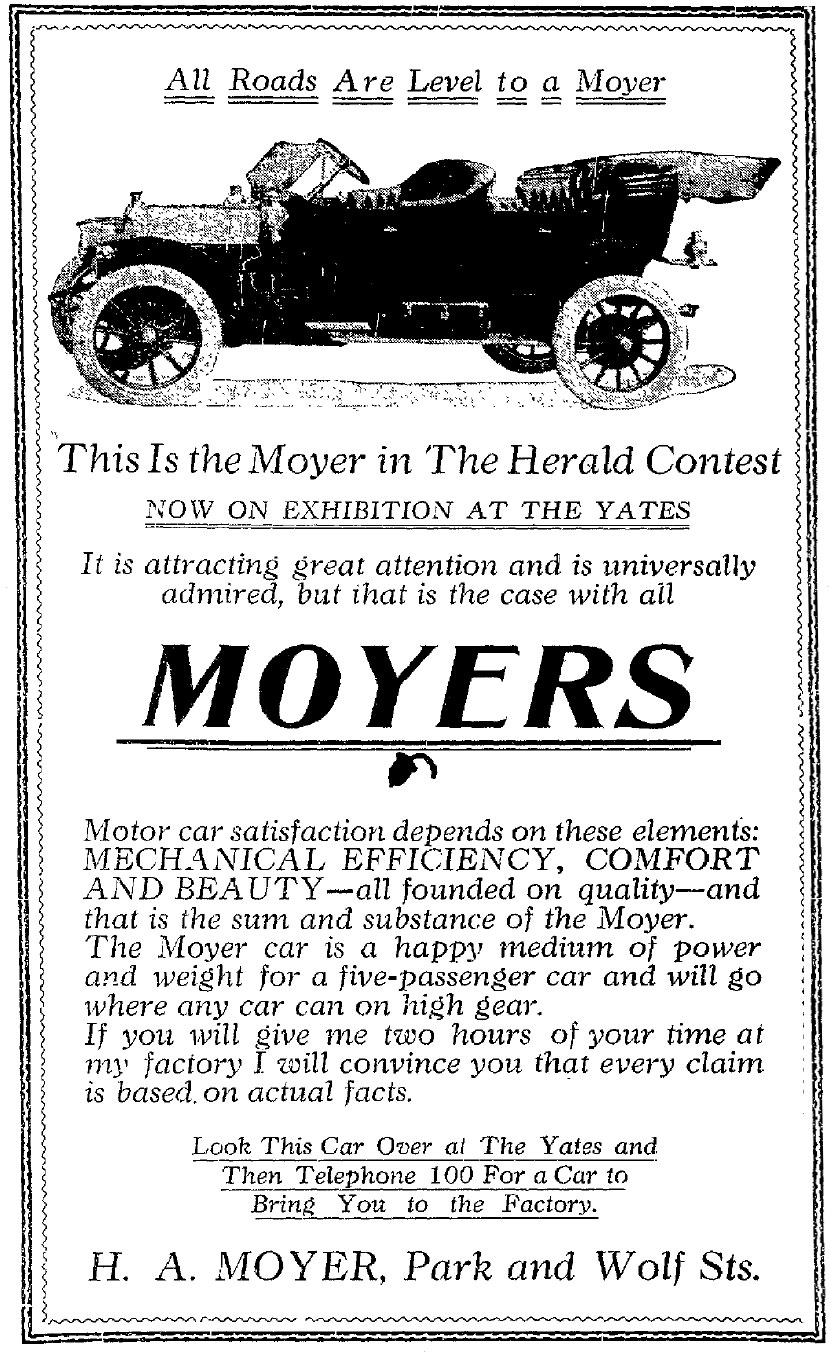
1912 Moyer Advertisement

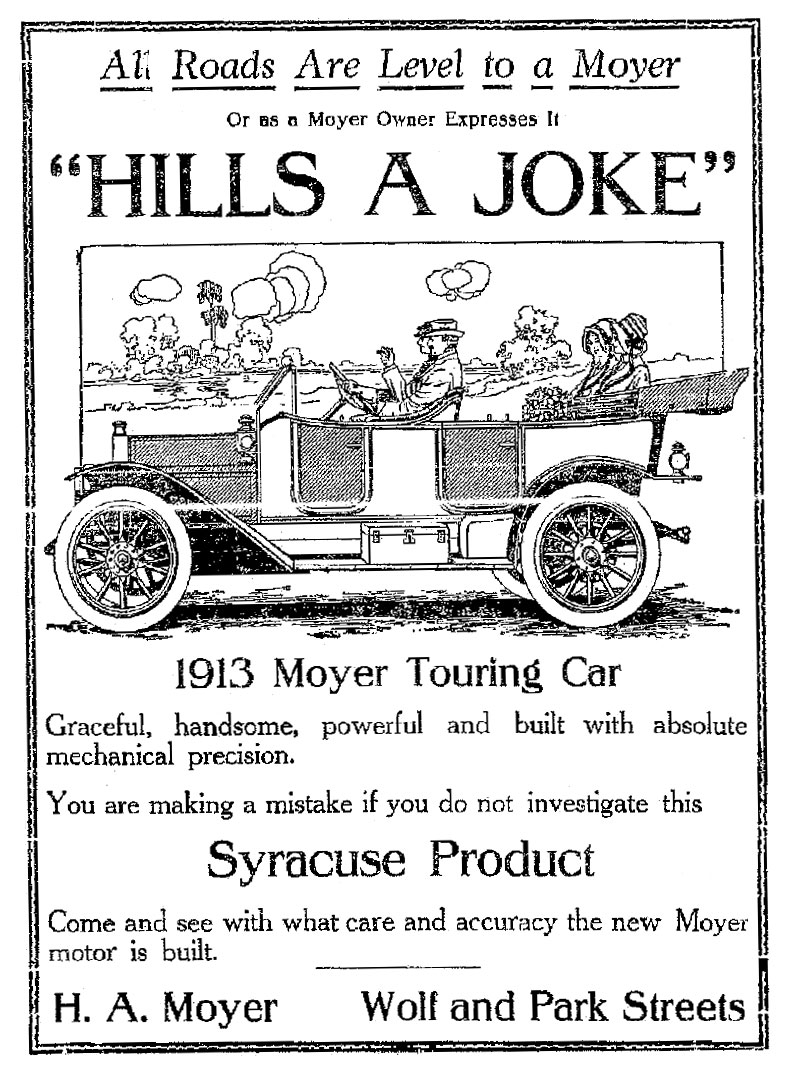
1912 Moyer advertisement

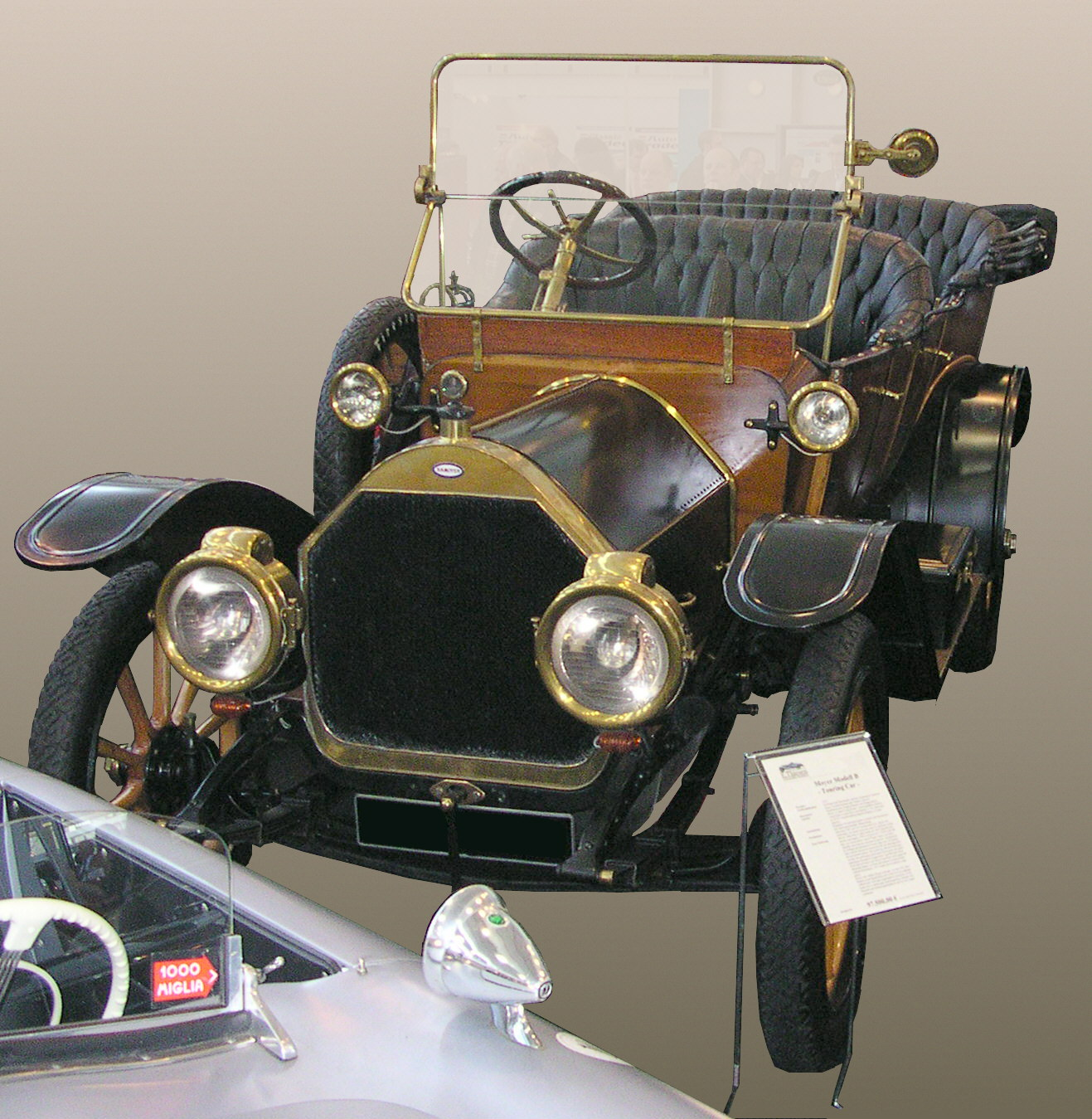
1913 Moyer Model B Touring Car

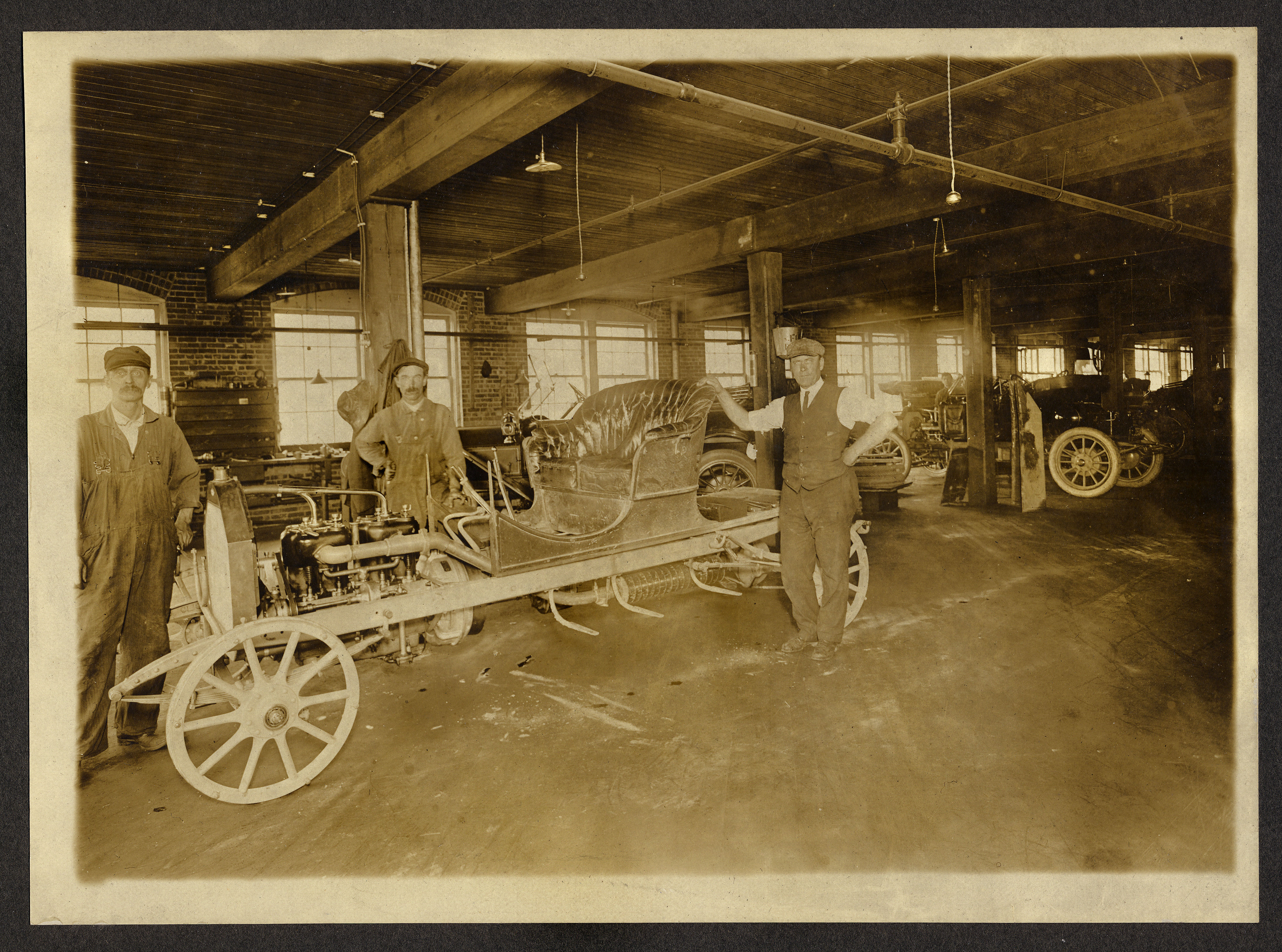
1912 H. A. Moyer factory assembly
