= Harvey A. Moyer =

Harvey Allen Moyer
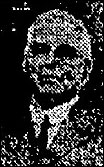
- Born: 1853; Clay, New York, United States
- Died: October 9, 1935 (aged 82); Syracuse, New York, United States
- Occupations: Carriage Builder, Auto Manufacturer
- Spouse: Rosamond Wilcox
- Children: Bert W. Moyer who married Edna Cholet; Maude Moyer who married architect Ward Wellington Ward

Harvey A. Moyer (1853 – October 9, 1935) was born in Clay, New York, and founded the H. A. Moyer Carriage Company in Cicero, New York, in 1876. The company relocated to Syracuse, New York, in 1880 and later changed assembly to luxury automobiles in 1908 and was renamed the H. A. Moyer Automobile Company. After discontinuing production of the Moyer Car in 1915, Moyer incorporated the business, H. A. Moyer, Inc., and became a dealer for Velie automobiles and Stearns-Knight automobiles. Stearns-Knight operated for only a short time before merging with Willys-Overland. He was buried at Woodlawn Cemetery (Syracuse, NY), Section 25, Plot 10

== Moyer inventions ==
Moyer applied for several patents on various devices between the years 1882 and 1898. The list of patents includes:

- 1882: Hub-boring machine
- 1884: Pleasure-cart
- 1887: Spring-vehicle
- 1892: Hub-boring machine
- 1893: Folding seat for carriages
- 1893: Bolster-plate
- 1893: Spring-vehicle
- 1896: Design for a sleigh
- 1896: Hub-boring machine
- 1897: Thill-coupling (along with C. J. Graf)
- 1898: Noiseless king bolt
- 1898: Spring-vehicle
- 1899: Self-oiling axle
- 1899: Moyers 30 Day Axle Grease

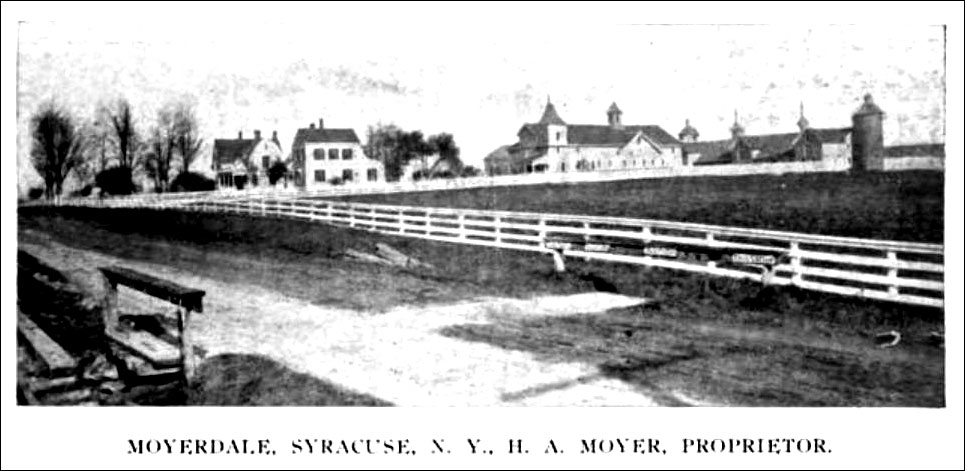
Moyerdale in 1903, owned by H. A. Moyer - Holstein-Friesian register, Volume 18, 1903
