= Frederick C. Brower =

- Born: c. 1851; Syracuse, Onondaga County, New York, United States
- Died: July 14, 1931 (aged 80); Syracuse, Onondaga County, United States
- Occupation(s): Inventor, locksmith and businessman
- Children: Carolyn Brower Hensel (born 1892)
- Parent(s): Hiram C. Brower (October 28, 1826 – November 18, 1911); Sarah A. Davis (October 15, 1828 – December 16, 1911)

Frederick C. Brower (c. 1851 – July 14, 1931), a safe expert and locksmith by trade, was an inventor from Syracuse, New York. He built a one-of-a-kind automobile, called the Brower between the years 1884 and 1895, although the exact date is not known. If the automobile was built before 1893, it might have been one of the first successful automobiles made in America.

Brower also introduced the telephone to the city in 1878 after seeing the device exhibited at the Philadelphia Exposition of 1876 and secured the rights for Central New York from the Bell system. Later, he installed private phones in the city.
