= History of Syracuse, New York =

American municipal history

Historical population
Census	Pop.	Note	%±
1850	22,271		—
1860	28,119		26.3%
1870	43,051		53.1%
1880	51,792		20.3%
1890	88,143		70.2%
1900	108,374		23.0%
1910	137,249		26.6%
1920	171,717		25.1%
1930	209,326		21.9%
1940	205,967		−1.6%
1950	220,583		7.1%
1960	216,038		−2.1%
1970	197,208		−8.7%
1980	170,105		−13.7%
1990	163,860		−3.7%
2000	147,306		−10.1%
2010	145,170		−1.5%
2020	148,620		2.4%

Syracuse is a city in Central New York sited on the former lands of the Onondaga Nation. Officially incorporated as a village in 1825, it has been at a major crossroads over the last two centuries, first of the Erie Canal and its branch canals, then on the railway network. The city grew on the back of its salt and chemical industries, and later as a center of manufacturing and engineering. Although its industries have dwindled, the city has remained the economic and educational hub of Central New York, a region with over a million inhabitants; the population of the city, though, has been in decline since peaking in the 1950s.

== Early history ==
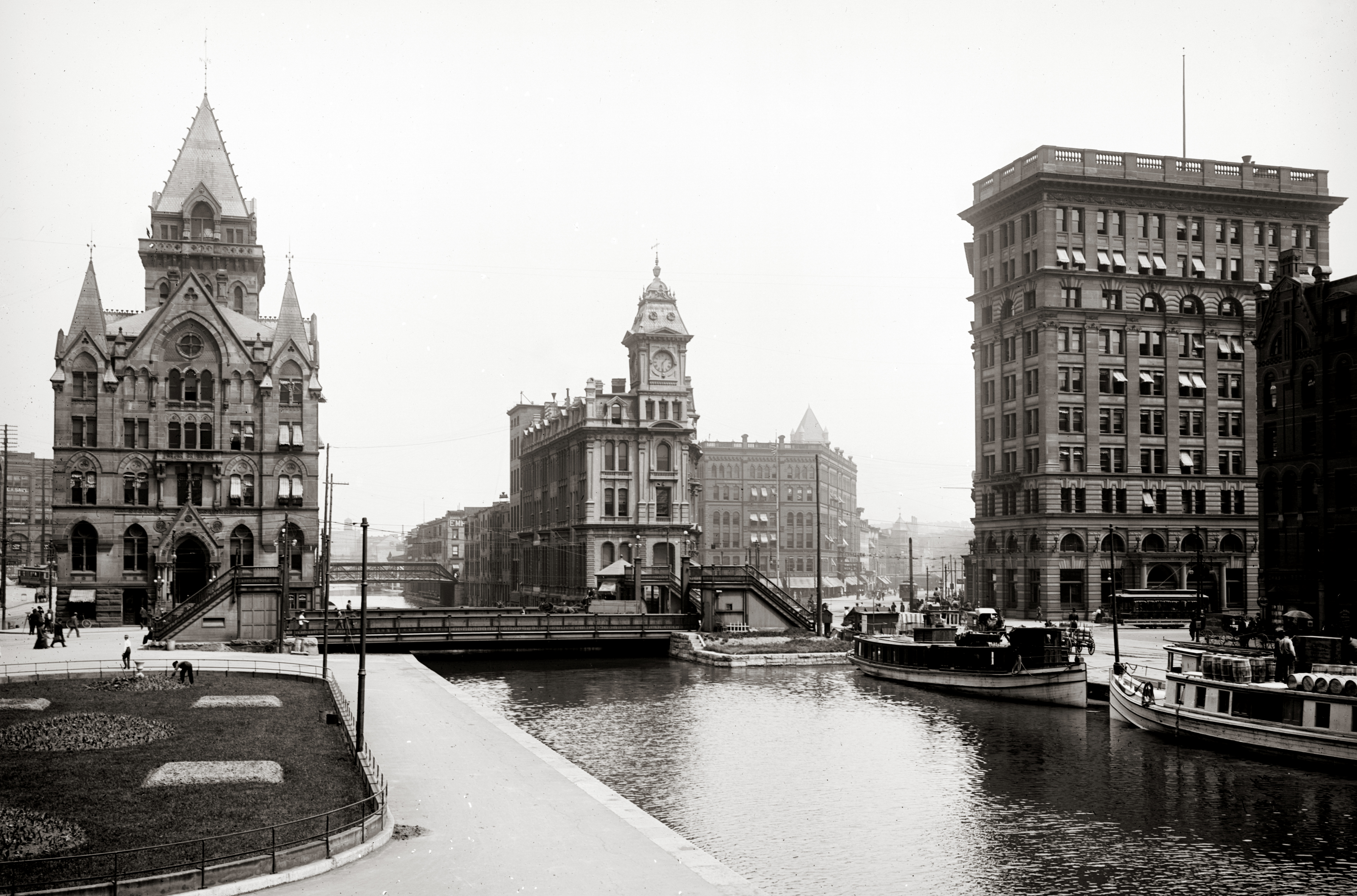
Erie Canal at Salina Street

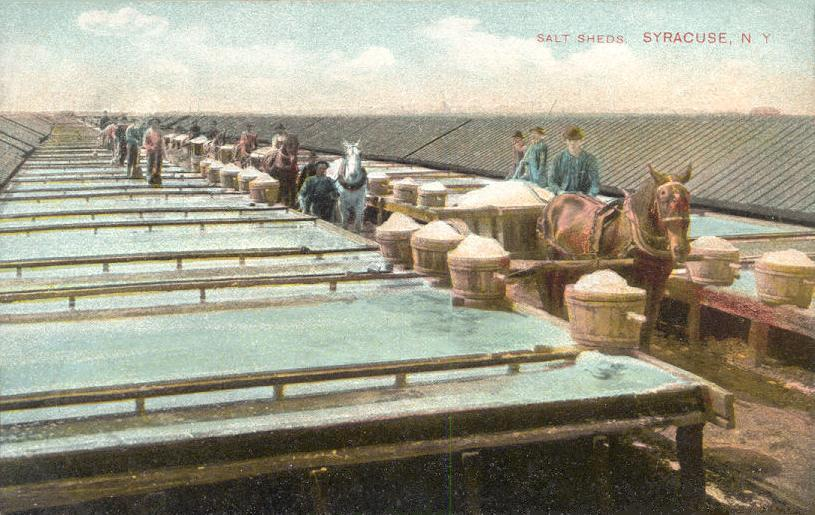
Salt sheds c. 1908

French missionaries were the first Europeans to come to this area, arriving to work with and convert the Native Americans in the mid-17th century. At the invitation of the Onondaga Nation, one of the five nations of the Iroquois Confederacy, a Jesuit priest by the name of Simon Le Moyne, accompanied by soldiers and coureurs des bois, including Pierre Esprit Radisson, set up a mission, known as Ste. Marie de Gannentaha on the northeast shore of Onondaga Lake.

The mission was short-lived, as the Mohawk Nation hinted to the Onondaga that they should sever their ties with the French or suffer a horrible fate. The French interpreted this as an impending attack by the Mohawk, and Radisson and some of the other Frenchmen fled by night, having been there less than two years. Le Moyne shortly thereafter travelled to Mohawk territory to pursue diplomacy. The remains of the mission have been located underneath a restaurant in nearby Liverpool, NY, where a living history museum now recreates the mission.

Just after the Revolutionary War, more settlers came to the area, mostly to trade with the Onondaga Nation. Ephraim Webster left the Continental Army to settle there in 1784 along with Asa Danforth, another Revolutionary War hero. Comfort Tyler, whose engineering skill contributed to regional development, arrived four years later. All three settled in Onondaga Hollow, south of the present city center, which was marshland at the time.

Jesuit missionaries visiting the Syracuse region in the mid 1600s reported brine springs around the southern end of "Salt Lake", known today as Onondaga Lake. In 1788 the Treaty of Fort Stanwix, and the subsequent designation of the area as the Onondaga Salt Springs Reservation by the state of New York, provided the basis for commercial salt production from the late 1700s through to the early 1900s. Brine from wells that tapped into halite (common salt) beds in the Salina shale near Tully, New York, 15 miles south of the city, were developed in the 19th century. It is the north-flowing brine from Tully that is the source of salt for the "salty springs" found along the shoreline of Onondaga lake. The rapid development of this industry in the 18th and 19th centuries led to Syracuse's nickname—"The Salt City".

== 19th century ==
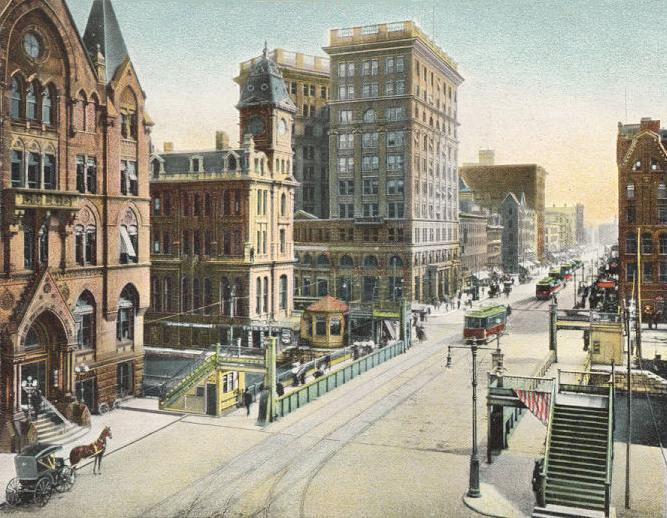
South Salina Street c.1905

Syracuse went through several name changes before 1824, being first called Salt Point (1780), then Webster's Landing (1786), Bogardus Corners (1796), Milan (1809), South Salina (1812), Cossits’ Corners (1814), and Corinth (1817). The U.S. Postal Service rejected the name Corinth upon its application for a post office, stating there was already a post office by this name in New York. The name Syracuse was chosen, after Syracuse, Sicily, because of similarities such as a salt industry and a neighboring village named Salina.

In 1825, the Village of Syracuse was officially incorporated. Five years later the Erie Canal, which ran through the village, was completed. The Village of Syracuse and the Village of Salina were combined into the City of Syracuse on December 14, 1847. Harvey Baldwin was the first mayor of the new city.

=== Early industries ===
Lewis Hamilton Redfield started the first weekly newspaper, Onondaga Register which published its first issue on September 17, 1814.

The opening of the Erie Canal caused a steep increase in the sale of salt, not only because of the lower cost of transportation, but because the canal led New York farms to change their production from wheat to pork and curing pork required salt. Until 1900, the bulk of the salt used in the United States came from Syracuse. As salt production climbed, the processing became increasingly mechanized and local industry became more generalized. The population grew from 250 in 1820, to 22,271 in 1850.

The first Solvay Process Company plant in the United States was erected on the southeastern shore of Onondaga lake in 1884 and the village was given the name Solvay, New York, to commemorate its inventor, Ernest Solvay. In 1861, he developed the ammonia-soda process for the manufacture of soda ash (anhydrous sodium carbonate—a rare chemical called natrite, to distinguish it from natural natron of antiquity). The process used sodium chloride, from brine wells dug in the southern end of the Tully valley, and limestone as a source of calcium carbonate. The process was an improvement on the earlier Leblanc process. The Syracuse Solvay plant was the incubator for a large chemical industry complex owned by Allied Signal in Syracuse. This plant, though, made Onondaga Lake the most polluted in the nation. Efforts to clean up the lake continue to this day.

Since the discovery of large deposits of trona (natural sodium carbonate) in 1938 near Green River in Wyoming, the Solvay process became uneconomical. The Syracuse Solvay Process Company plant closed permanently in 1985 and no such plants now operate in North America. However, throughout the rest of the world, the Solvay process remains the main source of soda ash.

The closing of the Onondaga Salt Springs Reservation in the early 1900s and the end to mining brine in the southern part of the Tully valley in the late 1900s marked the end of salt mining in the Syracuse region. However, groundwater flowing along the southeastern shore of Onondaga lake in Syracuse still allows salty water from a thousand feet below the southern Tully valley to flow by gravity, feeding salt springs around the lake where the Salina shale contains no halite beds.

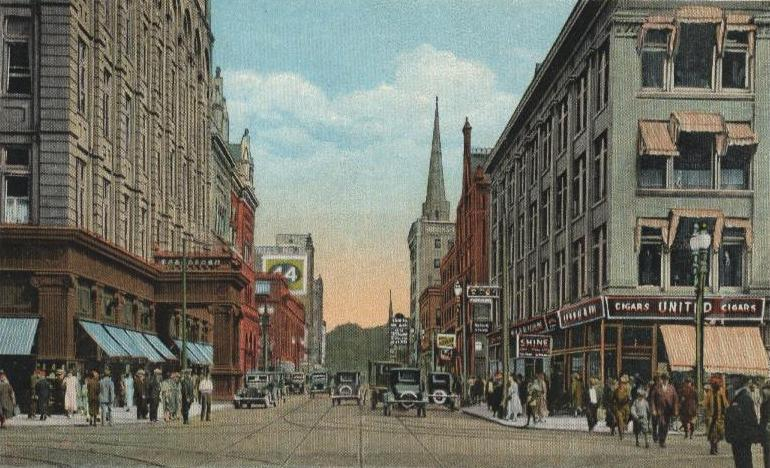
Fayette Street c. 1920

=== Abolitionism and the Underground Railroad ===
Syracuse became an active center of the abolitionist movement, due in large part to the influence of Gerrit Smith and a group allied with him. They were mostly associated with the Unitarian Church and their pastor (the Reverend Samuel May) in Syracuse, as well as with Quakers in nearby Skaneateles. Additionally, they were supported by abolitionists in many other religious congregations. Syracuse was known as the "great central depot on the Underground Railroad" prior to the Civil War, due to the work of Jermain Wesley Loguen and others in defying federal law. On October 1, 1851, William Henry, a freed slave known as "Jerry", was arrested under the Fugitive Slave Law. The anti-slavery Liberty Party was holding its state convention in the city and when word of the arrest spread, several hundred abolitionists (including Charles Augustus Wheaton) broke into the city jail and freed Jerry. The event came to be widely known as the "Jerry Rescue". In the aftermath, the Congregationalist minister Samuel Ringgold Ward had to flee to Canada to escape persecution because of his participation.

=== Industry and education in the late 19th century ===
The salt industry declined after the Civil War, and a new manufacturing industry arose in its place. Throughout the late 1800s and early 1900s numerous businesses and stores were established, including the Franklin Automobile Company (which produced the first air-cooled engine in the world), the Century Motor Vehicle Company and the Craftsman Workshops, the center of Gustav Stickley's handmade furniture empire.

Syracuse University was chartered in 1870 as a Methodist-Episcopal institution.

The Geneva Medical College was founded in 1834. It is now known as Upstate Medical University and is the most prestigious medical college in the Syracuse area. It is one of only four in the State University of New York system and one of only five medical schools in the state north of New York City.

== 20th century ==
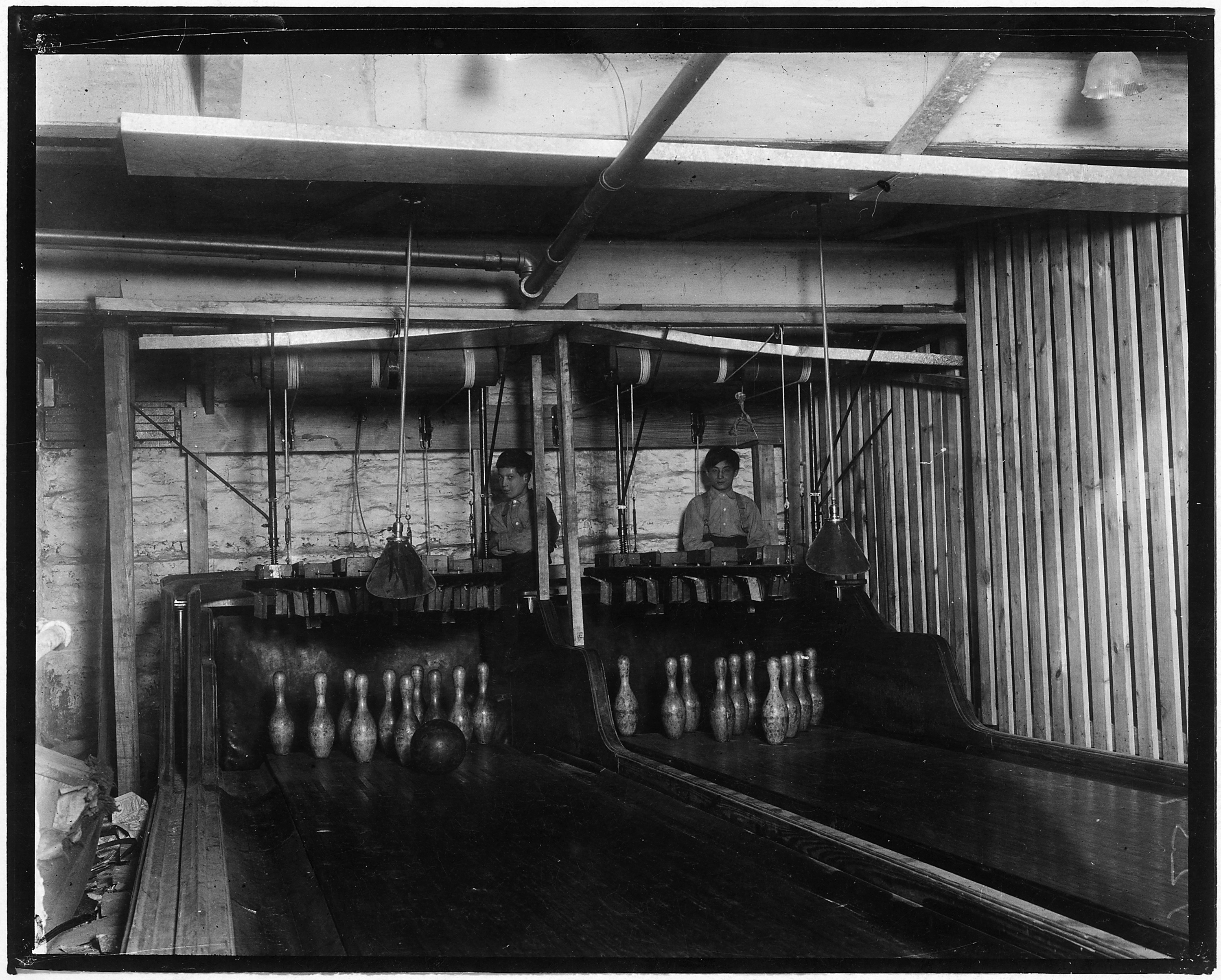
Children working in a Syracuse bowling alley, 1910. Photo by Lewis Hine.

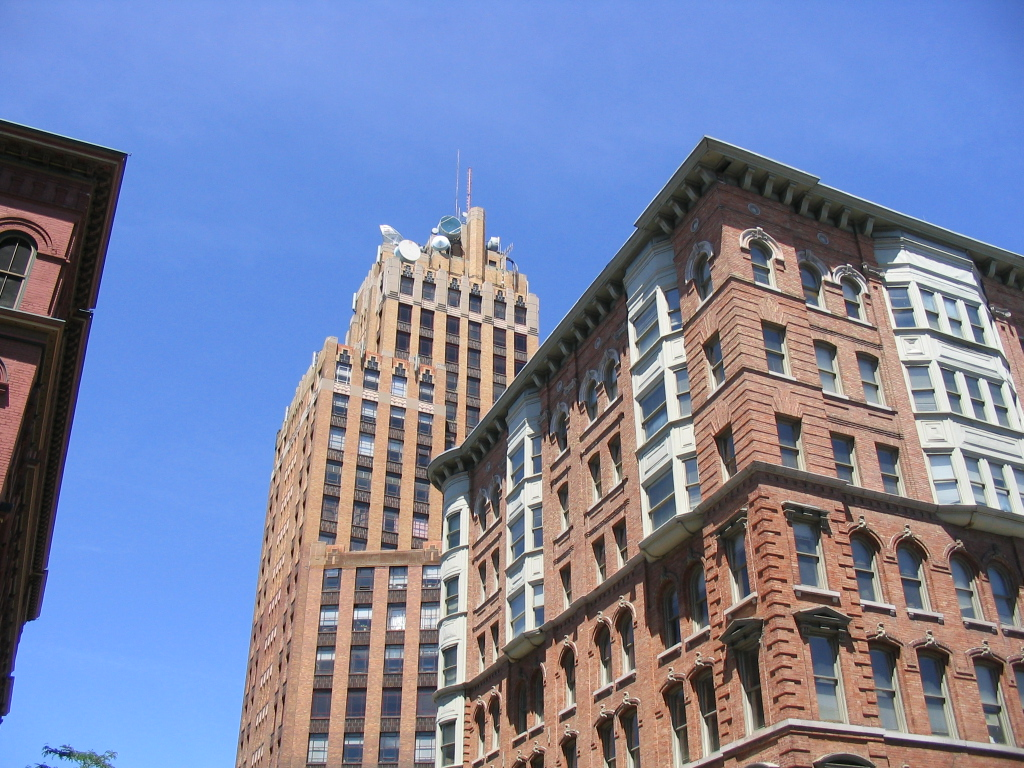
The State Tower Building (rear), the city's tallest, completed in 1928

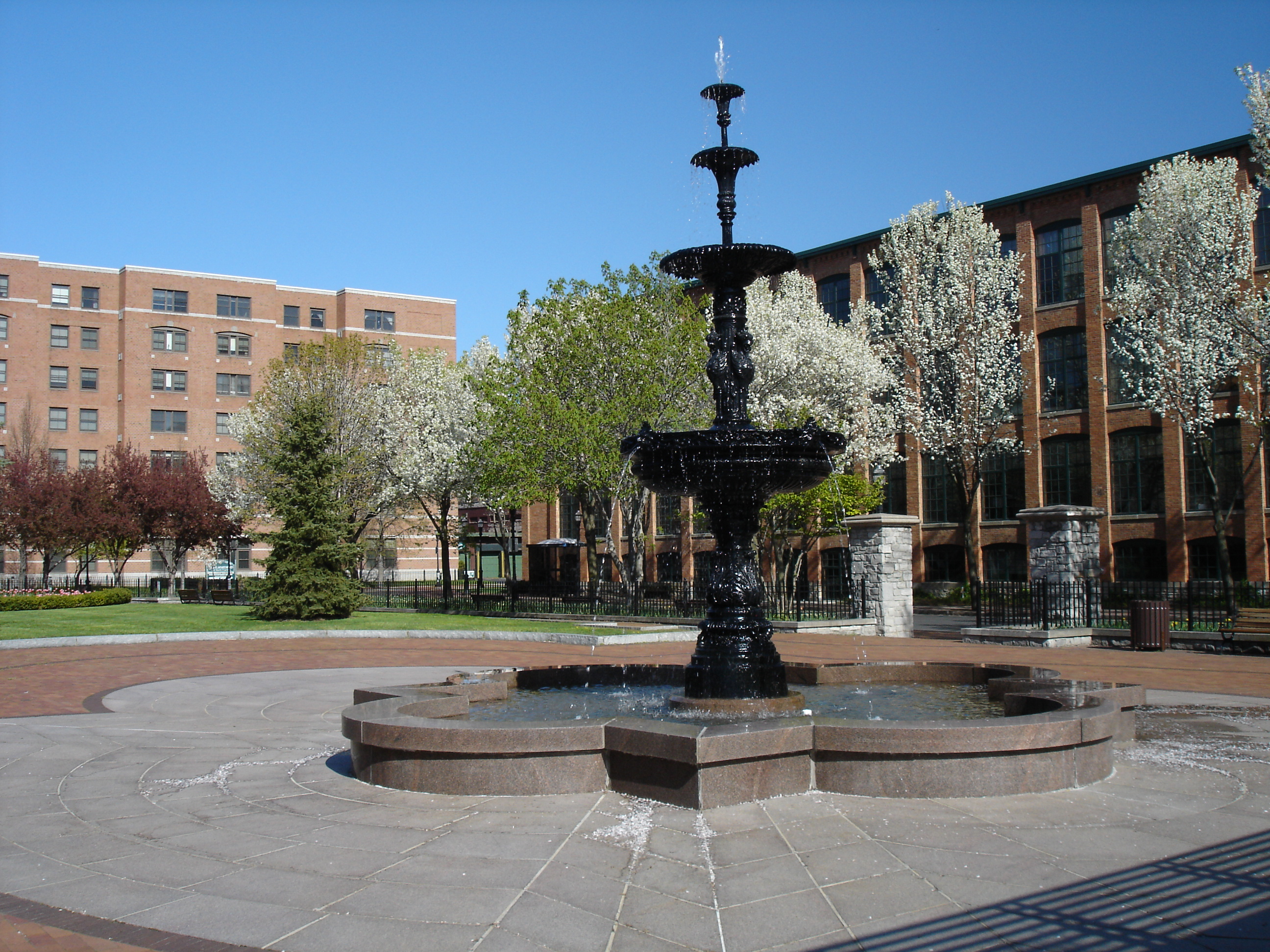
Syracuse is actively renovating former industrial areas into usable space today. One example is Franklin Square.

By the 20th century, Syracuse University was no longer sectarian and had grown from a few classrooms located in downtown Syracuse into a major research institution. It is nationally recognized for its college basketball, college football, and college lacrosse teams. In 1911, under the leadership of Syracuse University trustee, Louis Marshall, the New York State College of Forestry was re-established in close association with Syracuse University. It since has evolved into the SUNY-ESF. Le Moyne College was founded in 1946 and Onondaga Community College in 1962.

World War II sparked significant expansion in the area in the specialty steel, fasteners, custom machining industries. After the war, two of the "Big Three" automobile manufacturers (General Motors & Chrysler) had major operations in the area. Syracuse was headquarters for Carrier Corporation and Crouse-Hinds traffic signal manufacturing, whilst General Electric had its main television manufacturing plant at Electronics Parkway.

Syracuse's population peaked at 221,000 in 1950, when the Census Bureau reported Syracuse's population as 97.7% White and 2.1% African American. Immigration from abroad introduced many ethnic groups to the city, particularly German, Irish, Italian, and Polish. African Americans had lived in Syracuse since the Revolutionary War but, between 1940 and 1960, some of the three million African Americans who migrated from the south to northern cities settled in Syracuse. In the 1980s many immigrants from Africa and Central America also moved to Syracuse, sometimes under the auspices of religious charities. However, these new Syracusans could not make up for the flow of residents out of Syracuse, either to its suburbs or out of state, owing to job loss.

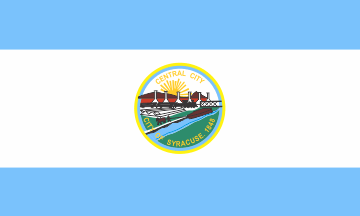
Flag of Syracuse, New York (1986–2023)

Much of the city fabric changed after World War II, although Pioneer Homes, one of the earliest government housing projects in the US, had been completed in 1941. Many of Syracuse's landmark buildings were demolished in the 1950s and 1960s. The federal Urban Renewal program cleared large sectors which remained undeveloped for many decades, although several new museums and government buildings were built.

The manufacturing industry in Syracuse began to falter in the 1970s. Many small businesses failed during this time, which contributed to an already increasing unemployment rate. Rockwell International moved their factory out of the state, and General Electric moved its television manufacturing operations firstly to Suffolk, Virginia, and later to Singapore. The Carrier Corporation moved its headquarters out of Syracuse and outsourced manufacturing to Asian locations. Nevertheless, although city population has declined since 1950, the population of Syracuse metropolitan area has remained fairly stable, even growing by 2.5 percent since 1970. While this growth rate is greater than in much of upstate New York, it is far below the national average during that period.

== See also ==
- Central New York Military Tract
- History of the Seal of the City of Syracuse
- National Register of Historic Places listings in Syracuse, New York
