= South Marengo Historic District =

Historic district in California, United States

- U.S. National Register of Historic Places
- U.S. Historic district
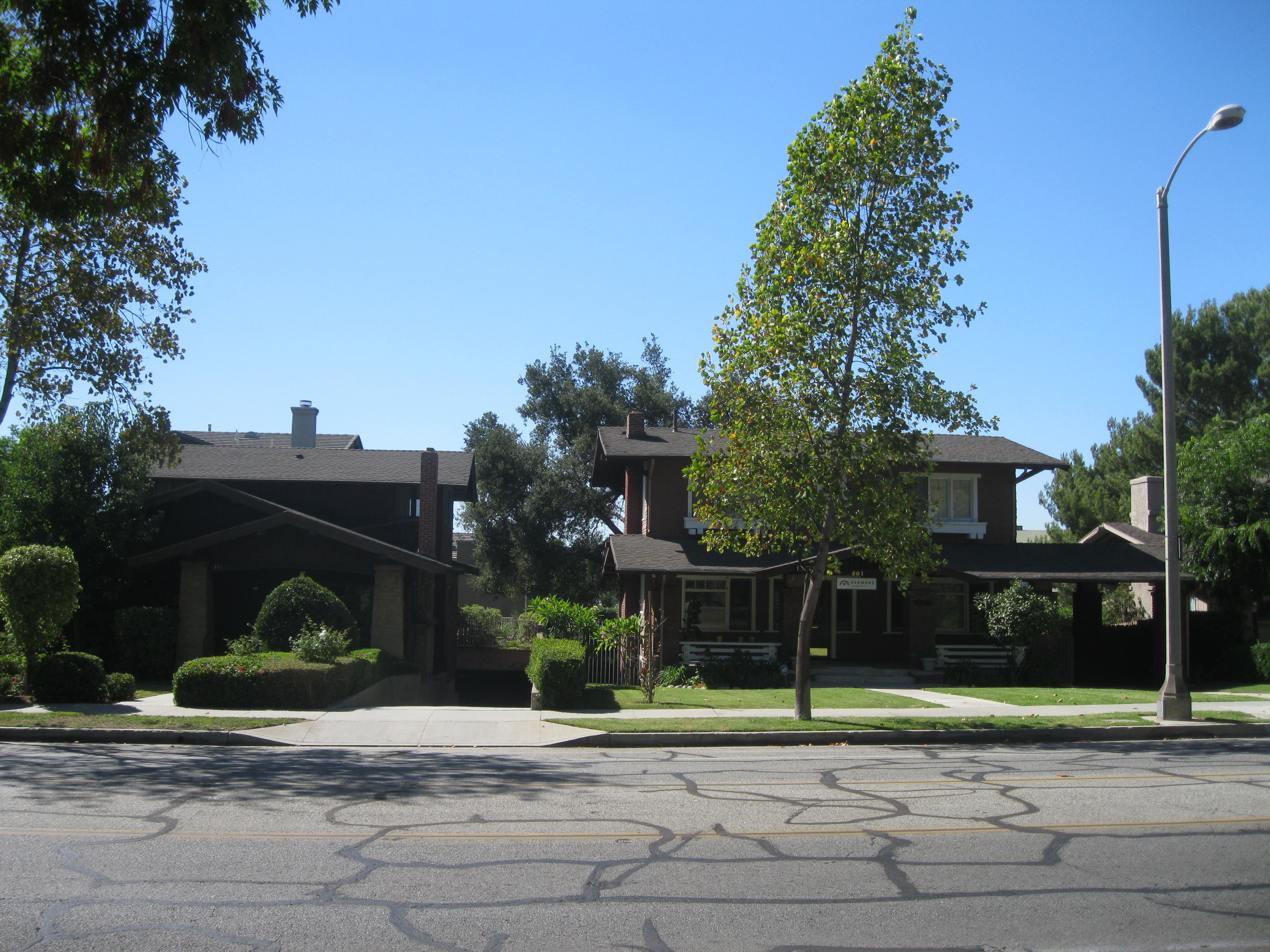
- 501 and 511 S. Marengo Avenue

- Location within the Los Angeles metropolitan area Location within California Location within the United States
- Location: S. Marengo Ave., Pasadena, California
- Coordinates: 34°8′12″N 118°8′42″W
- Area: 3 acres (1.2 ha)
- Architectural style: Bungalow, American Craftsman
- NRHP reference No.: 82002199
- Added to NRHP: June 2, 1982

The South Marengo Historic District is a residential historic district located along South Marengo Avenue in Pasadena, California. The district consists of twelve Craftsman-style bungalows situated on the two blocks between Bellevue Drive and California Boulevard. The homes were built from 1901 to 1916, at the height of the bungalow's popularity in Pasadena. Several prominent local architects designed the homes, including Louis B. Easton, planner of the homes at 530 and 540 South Marengo; Easton's work was featured in Gustav Stickley's magazine The Craftsman. Marengo Avenue was considered an upscale district of Pasadena at the time, partly due to its well-designed homes and partly due to the pepper trees planted along the street.

The district was added to the National Register of Historic Places on June 2, 1982.
