= Stickley House =

Stickley House may refer to:

- Stickley House (Madisonville, Tennessee), listed on the National Register of Historic Places in Monroe County, Tennessee
- Gustav Stickley House, Syracuse, New York, listed on the NRHP in Onondaga County, New York

== See also ==
- Craftsman Farms, New Jersey, built by Gustav Stickley
