= William Kennedy (New York politician) =

American politician

William Kennedy (August 2, 1851 – September 7, 1913) was an American lawyer and politician from New York.

== Life ==
Kennedy was born on August 2, 1851, in Pompey, New York. He was the son of building contractor Thomas B. Kennedy and Mary Burns, both Irish immigrants. His younger brother James K. would become a successful lawyer in his own right.

After attending Pompey Academy, Kennedy began studying law in the law office of William Sanders and Charles G. Baldwin of Syracuse. He was admitted to the bar in 1876 and joined Sanders and Baldwin's law firm. He later worked with Walter W. Magee in a law firm called Baldwin, Kennedy & Magee. He eventually became a prominent lawyer in Syracuse.

In 1890, Kennedy was elected to the New York State Assembly as a Republican, representing the Onondaga County 2nd District. He served in the Assembly in 1891 and 1892.

In 1888, Kennedy married Ellen S. Ward. He was a member of the New York State Bar Association, the Independent Order of Foresters, and the Citizens' Club of Syracuse.

Kennedy died at home on September 7, 1913. He was buried in Oakwood Cemetery.

New York State Assembly
Preceded by Willis B. Burns	New York State Assembly; Onondaga County, 2nd District; 1891-1892	Succeeded by Jonathan Wyckoff
