= House at 530 S. Marengo Avenue =

Historic house in California, United States

- U.S. National Register of Historic Places
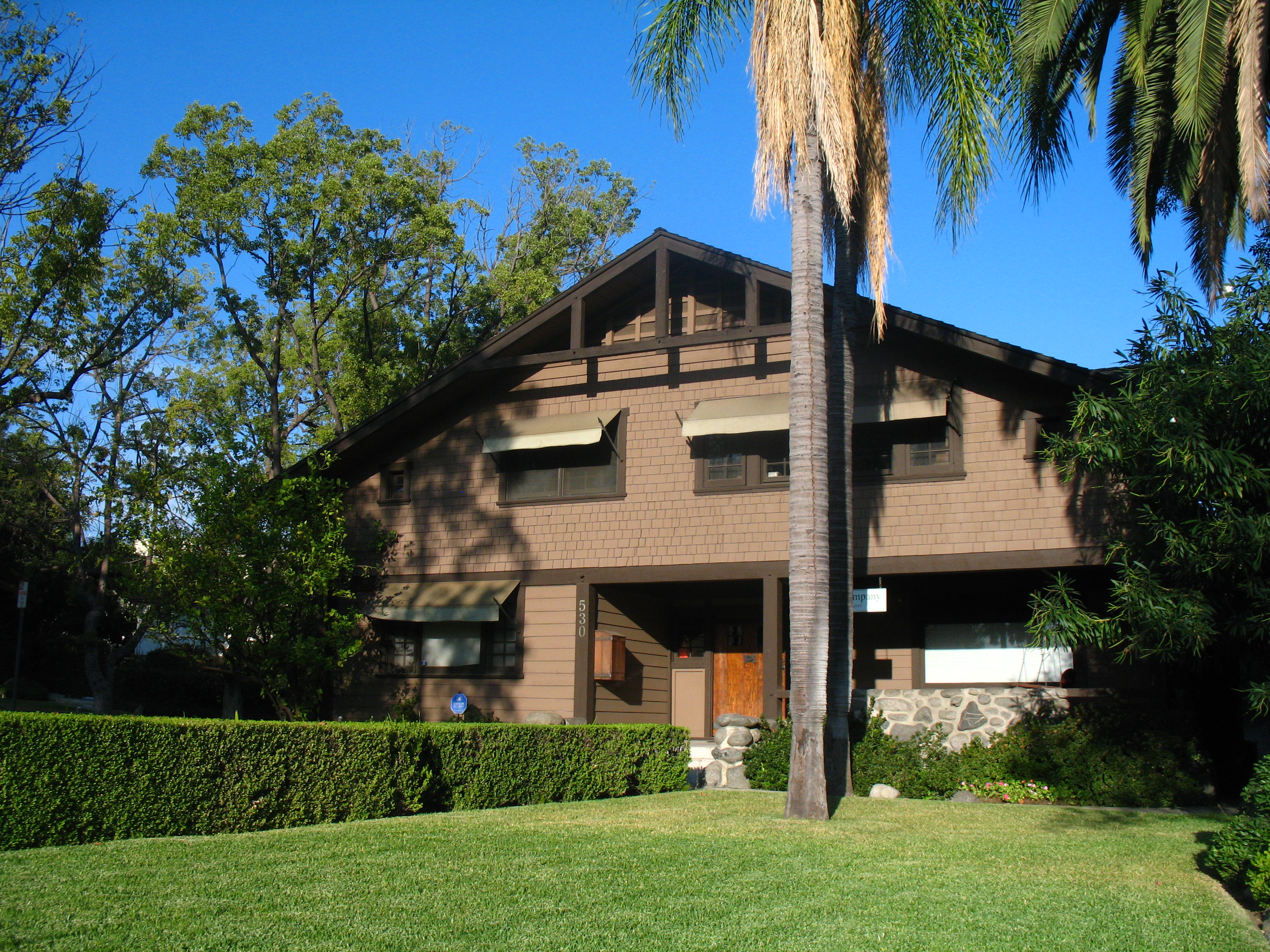

- Location within the Los Angeles metropolitan area Location within California Location within the United States
- Location: 530 S. Marengo Ave., Pasadena, California
- Coordinates: 34°4′2″N 118°8′38″W
- Area: 0.3 acres (0.12 ha)
- Built: 1905
- Architect: Easton, Louis B.
- Architectural style: American Craftsman
- NRHP reference No.: 79000492
- Added to NRHP: September 13, 1979

The House at 530 S. Marengo Avenue is a historic house in Pasadena, California. Built in 1905, the American Craftsman house was designed by Pasadena architect Louis B. Easton. Easton was one of several prominent Craftsman architects in Pasadena in the early 1900s; the house at 530 S. Marengo, located next to his own self-designed house at 540 S. Marengo, was one of his earliest designs. The house features exposed beams and hand-carved joint work in the spirit of the Craftsman style, which emphasized function over form. The interior of the home was inspired by homes in The Craftsman, Gustav Stickley's architecture magazine, which ultimately featured some of Easton's later works.

The house was added to the National Register of Historic Places on September 13, 1979.
