= Simon Le Moyne =

French missionary

Simon Le Moyne SJ (French pronunciation: [simɔ̃ lə mwan]; 22 October 1604 – 24 November 1665), sometimes spelled Simon Le Moine, was a French Jesuit priest who became involved with the mission to the Wendat (Huron) and Haudenosaunee (Iroquois) in the Americas.

Le Moyne had acquired sixteen years of education and experience through priesthood in France before his arrival in New France in 1638. During that same year, he headed out to his mission in Huron country. The destruction of the Wendat nation by the Haudenosaunee brought him back east to what is modern day Quebec in 1650.

He then undertook numerous missions to the Haudenosaunee at great risk to his personal safety, and lived within Onondaga and Mohawk territory. He is most notable in Canadian history for his work as an ambassador of peace to the Haudenosaunee. Le Moyne College in Syracuse, New York is named for him.

== Biography ==
Simon Le Moyne was born at Beauvais, France in 1604. He entered the Jesuit novitiate at Rouen on 10 December 1622 and studied philosophy at the Collège de Clermont in Paris (1624–27). He taught at Rouen from 1627 to 1632. Le Moyne was sent to Canada in 1638. He worked on the Huron mission with Pierre-Joseph-Marie Chaumonot and Francesco Giuseppe Bressani. Second only to Chaumonot in his mastery of the Wendat-Haudenosaunee languages, he was unequaled in the knowledge of the character of the Indigenous people, their customs, and traditions. This made him well-suited to serve as ambassador in difficult matters.

Around 1653, Le Moyne set out on an Iroquois Mission, at great risk, that would take him through the St. Lawrence valley and into Lake Ontario, where he would reach a fishing village in present-day Oswego. From there, he traveled south via the Oswego River to Onondaga Lake, home of the Onondaga, keepers of the council fire of the Haudenosaunee. After converting a large number of the Haudenosaunee, including some chiefs, Le Moyne returned to Canada with a favorable report. He was assigned to several more missions, including work with the Mohawks.

Le Moyne was the first explorer from Europe to discover the Salt Springs of Onondaga, near what is today Syracuse, New York. It is here where he set up his mission, Sainte Marie de Gannentaha.

Le Moyne made a number of journeys into Mohawk territory in an effort to further peace negotiations. During 1657–1658 he journeyed from Ossernenon (Auriesville, N.Y.) to New Amsterdam (New York) to attend to the few Catholics residing there as well as some French sailors who had recently arrived in port with a prize. He paid a call on the Dutch Reformed minister Johannes Megapolensis, who had shown kindness to Father Isaac Jogues after Jogues had been ransomed from the Mohawks by Dutch traders from Fort Orange (Albany, N.Y.). Le Moyne was cordially received by Pastor Megapolensis, and arrived back in Quebec on 21 May 1658.

On 21 July 1661, Father Le Moyne went again to Haudenosaunee territory to seek the release of French captives. He returned to Montreal on the 31st of August 1662 with nineteen freed captives. He died of fever in 1665 at Cap de la Madeleine, near Three Rivers.

== Legacy ==
Le Moyne College is a Jesuit college located in Syracuse, New York and named after Simon Le Moyne. The Le Moyne College seal includes downturned arrowheads which symbolize his work on behalf of diplomacy and peace. It also depicts flowing waters, to symbolize both the ritual of baptism and Father Le Moyne's discovery of the value of the Onondaga salt springs.

Since 1968 Le Moyne College has honored local and national figures with the "Simon Le Moyne Award" for outstanding leadership to the benefit of society.
