= Gustav Stickley House =

Historic house in Syracuse, New York

- U.S. National Register of Historic Places
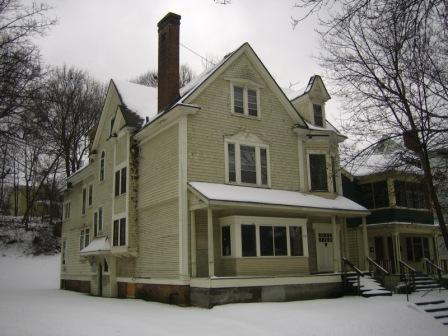

- Location within New York Location within the United States
- Interactive map showing the location for Gustav Stickley House
- Location: 438 Columbus Ave., Syracuse, New York
- Coordinates: 43°2′42″N 76°7′20″W
- Built: 1900
- Architect: Gustav Stickley
- Architectural style: Queen Anne
- NRHP reference No.: 84002820
- Added to NRHP: August 23, 1984

The Gustav Stickley House is a three-story wood frame Queen Anne style house in Syracuse, New York.

== History ==
The Gustav Stickley House was originally designed by architect Wellington Tabor and purchased in June 1900 by furniture designer Gustav Stickley. On the outside, it is similar to many other houses on the block and in the neighborhood, not far from Syracuse University. However, the chestnut wall paneling and beamed interior that Stickley designed is regarded as the first comprehensive American Craftsman residential interior in the United States.

Stickley owned this house between 1900 and 1911. On December 24, 1901, a chimney fire greatly damaged the house and the interior was renovated in 1902 by Stickley, who was by then a leading figure of the American Craftsman movement. After the death of his wife, Gustav lived with his daughter Barbara Stickley Wiles & her family at this house from 1919 to his death there in 1942.

Renderings of the interior and floor plans were published in December 1902 in The Craftsman, a magazine that Stickley founded in 1901. A reprint of the article appears in the NRHP nomination document.

The house was added to the National Register of Historic Places in 1984. After being vacant for over 20 years and in very deteriorated condition a comprehensive exterior restoration was completed by the University Neighborhood Preservation Association in 2018. A not-for-profit "friends" group, the "Gustav Stickley House Foundation, Inc.", has been formed to fund raise and support the Phase 2 interior restoration. By 2020, the Stickley House foundation was raising $2.2 million to renovate the interior.

== See also ==
- Craftsman Farms
