= Willis B. Burns =

American businessman and politician

Willis Bates Burns (May 28, 1851 – August 15, 1915) was an American businessman and politician from New York. He became Mayor of Syracuse and Mayor of the suburbs of Danforth and Geddes.

== Life ==
Burns was born on May 28, 1851, in Syracuse, New York, the son of Peter Burns and Elizabeth Bates. He graduated from Mt. Pleasant Military Academy in 1868.

After finishing school, Burns began working for the saddlery hardware manufacturer Frazer & Burns, which his father was a partner of. He spent three years in the firm's office, two years in the factory, and two years handling the company's business on the road. When his father retired from the firm, he bought his father's interest in the firm and spent five years managing the firm. He then sold his interest to the Frazer & Jones Company. In 1882, he founded the manufacturing business Syracuse Malleable Iron Works, serving as its proprietor and sole owner. He was also a director of the Merchants' National Bank.

In 1889, Burns was elected to the New York State Assembly as a Republican, representing the Onondaga County 2nd District. He served in the Assembly in 1890. In the Assembly, he helped secure passage of a bill that granted Syracuse the right to take water from Skaneateles Lake. He previously served as Alderman from the Sixth Ward in 1882 to 1883. He also served as Mayor of Syracuse in 1887, and as Mayor of the suburbs of Danforth and Geddes were annexed to the city and Burnet Park was accepted by the city.

Burns was a member of the Freemasons, the Masonic Veterans Association of Central New York, the Knights Templar, the Scottish Rite, the Shriners, and the Elks. He was married to Fannie D.

Burns died at home from an illness he had for several years on August 15, 1915. He was buried in Oakwood Cemetery.

Political offices
Preceded by Thomas Ryan	Mayor of Syracuse; 1886–1887	Succeeded by William Burns Kirk III
New York State Assembly
Preceded by William H. Gallup	New York State Assembly; Onondaga County, 2nd District; 1890	Succeeded by William Kennedy
