= Seal of City of Syracuse =

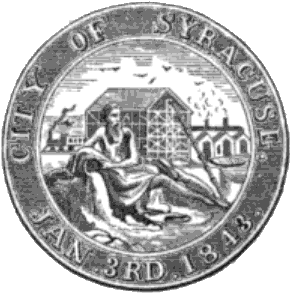
City of Syracuse, New York - Seal 1843

Historic seal of Syracuse, which was in sole use from 1885 to 1974

The Seal of City of Syracuse, New York, dates back to founding of Syracuse in 1848, with the joining of the villages of Syracuse and Geddes.

== History ==
=== 1800s ===
The first city seal included a man or god of antiquity, possibly Neptune, reclining in front of a locomotive, three small buildings, and a salt barn. The locomotive and the buildings protrude steam in the depiction.

By 1860 the seal had been modified to include more smoke stacks, solar salt vats, and hills.

The ancient man or god disappeared by 1877, and the depiction changes to a canal boat, steam train, horse, and boatman. The number of smoke stacks were reduced as well. For the first time the nickname "Central City" appeared, and this seal became official in 1885, and remained the sole seal of Syracuse until 1974.

=== 1974 ===
Lee Alexander, the 49th Mayor of Syracuse, released a slightly altered version of the 1885 seal in 1974, which no longer had smoke being emitted from the smokestacks.

Skyline seal developed under the Thomas Young administration

=== 1986 ===
His successor, Thomas Young, completely dropped the historic seal in 1986 for a new design depicting the Syracuse skyline and the crossing of two interstate highways.

=== 1994 ===
Young's successor Roy Bernardi returned to the historic seal in 1994 to represent the "historical nature" of the city. The Syracuse Post-Standard and Syracuse Herald-Journal conducted a phone poll, which favored the Young seal by 79 percent. Bernardi then clarified that the new seal would still be used on city stationary for economic development and tourism, with the old seal being used for reasons of government. A third logo, depicting the bell tower of Syracuse City Hall was also introduced.

"So, now we've got the bell tower, the lovely city skyline or the smokestacks - something for everyone." - Bernardi spokesman James Parenti.

Under the administration of Matthew Driscoll, Bernardi's successor, both the Alexander-modification of the original seal and the Young skyline seal continued to be used. For example, the front page of the Syracuse City Website use the Young seal, while city police cars are currently being painted with Alexander seal.

== See also ==
- History of Syracuse, New York
