= Irene Sargent =

American art historian

- Born: Jesse Irene Sargent; February 20, 1852
- Died: September 14, 1932 (aged 80)
- Burial place: Oakwood Cemetery
- Education: Syracuse University (1922) [Honorary]
- Years active: 1895–1932
- Employer: Syracuse University
- Organization: The Craftsman (magazine)
- Honours: American Institute of Architects (Honorary membership)

Irene Sargent (February 20, 1852 – September 14, 1932) was an American art historian and leading advocate of the American Arts and Crafts movement, especially through her numerous influential articles in The Craftsman magazine.

== Family and education ==
Sargent was famously reticent about her personal history, and little is known about her early life apart from the fact that she was born Jesse Irene Sargent in Auburn, New York. She was the fourth daughter of Rufus Sargent, a machine designer and tool manufacturer, and Phebe Sargent.

There is no record of Sargent having received any formal education, but she apparently traveled in Europe after her father's death in 1882 to further her studies. In 1922, Syracuse University awarded her an honorary doctorate in literature.

== Career ==
Sargent taught at Syracuse University for nearly four decades (1895–1932). She began as an instructor of French, moved on to be an instructor of Italian, and subsequently taught a range of courses in aesthetics, architecture, and art history. She became a professor of art history in 1908 and of Italian literature as well in 1914. Over the course of her career, she wrote over 150 articles and one book, Household Furniture: Its Origin from the Bed and the Chest (1926).

Sargent was a key figure in the founding and early years of The Craftsman, a leading American Arts and Crafts magazine published by Gustav Stickley. She wrote nearly all of its first three issues herself and thereafter usually wrote each issue's lead article as well as acting as its managing editor and designing its layouts. Her writing in The Craftsman did a great deal to shape public understanding of the American Arts and Crafts aesthetic and contributed enormously to the magazine's success. Her articles are still considered important original scholarship of great value to scholars of early 20th century American arts. She wrote on such subjects as John Ruskin, William Morris, the Gothic Revival, textile design, medieval silversmiths, and American art pottery.

Sargent wrote over 80 articles for The Craftsman between 1901 and 1905, stopping not long after Stickley moved the magazine to New York City. She began contributing instead to The Keystone, a jewelers' trade journal. From 1905 to 1920, she wrote more than five dozen articles on a wide range of applied arts for The Keystone. She chose this trade publication as the outlet for her scholarship because at the time American art journals were not receptive to scholarly research on the decorative arts. She also contributed to Keramic Studio, a ceramics magazine published by her Syracuse University colleague Adelaïde Alsop Robineau.

Sargent contributed articles on fine arts to two encyclopedias, A Cyclopaedia of Education and the Lincoln Library of Essential Information. She was also in demand as a public speaker.

In 1926, the American Institute of Architects awarded her an honorary membership in recognition of her contributions to scholarship in architecture and related fields, only the second woman in AIA history to receive this honor.

In the summer of 1932, a fall led to her death at the age of 80. She is buried in Oakwood Cemetery. Her papers are held by Syracuse University.
