= Sainte Marie among the Iroquois =

Park, living museum in New York, US

- Sainte Marie de Ganentaa

- Sainte Marie among the Iroquois
- Established: 1656 (Mission), 1930s (French "Fort"), 1990s (Mission Recreation)
- Location: Liverpool, New York, United States
- Coordinates: 43.09300°N 76.19637°W
- Type: park/living museum
- Website: https://www.skanonhcenter.org

Sainte Marie among the Iroquois (originally known as Sainte Marie de Gannentaha or St. Mary's of Ganantaa) was a 17th-century French Jesuit mission located in the middle of the Onondaga nation of the Haudenosaunee. It was located on Onondaga Lake near modern-day Syracuse, New York. The original mission, led by Jesuit priest Simon Le Moyne, was in use only from 1656 to 1658.

The museum is open year round. The recreation of the mission only operates from May through October. A modern replica of the mission’s encampment is in operation as a museum and interpretive center. Sainte Marie among the Iroquois is a living history museum and part of the Onondaga County parks system, and is therefore designated as a municipal park itself. The site, while county-owned, is operated by volunteers who provide all of the programming and maintain the displays.

In November 2015, the center was renamed and reopened as the Skä•noñh Center – Great Law of Peace Center, a Haudenosaunee (Iroquois) Heritage Site.

== History ==
=== Establishment ===
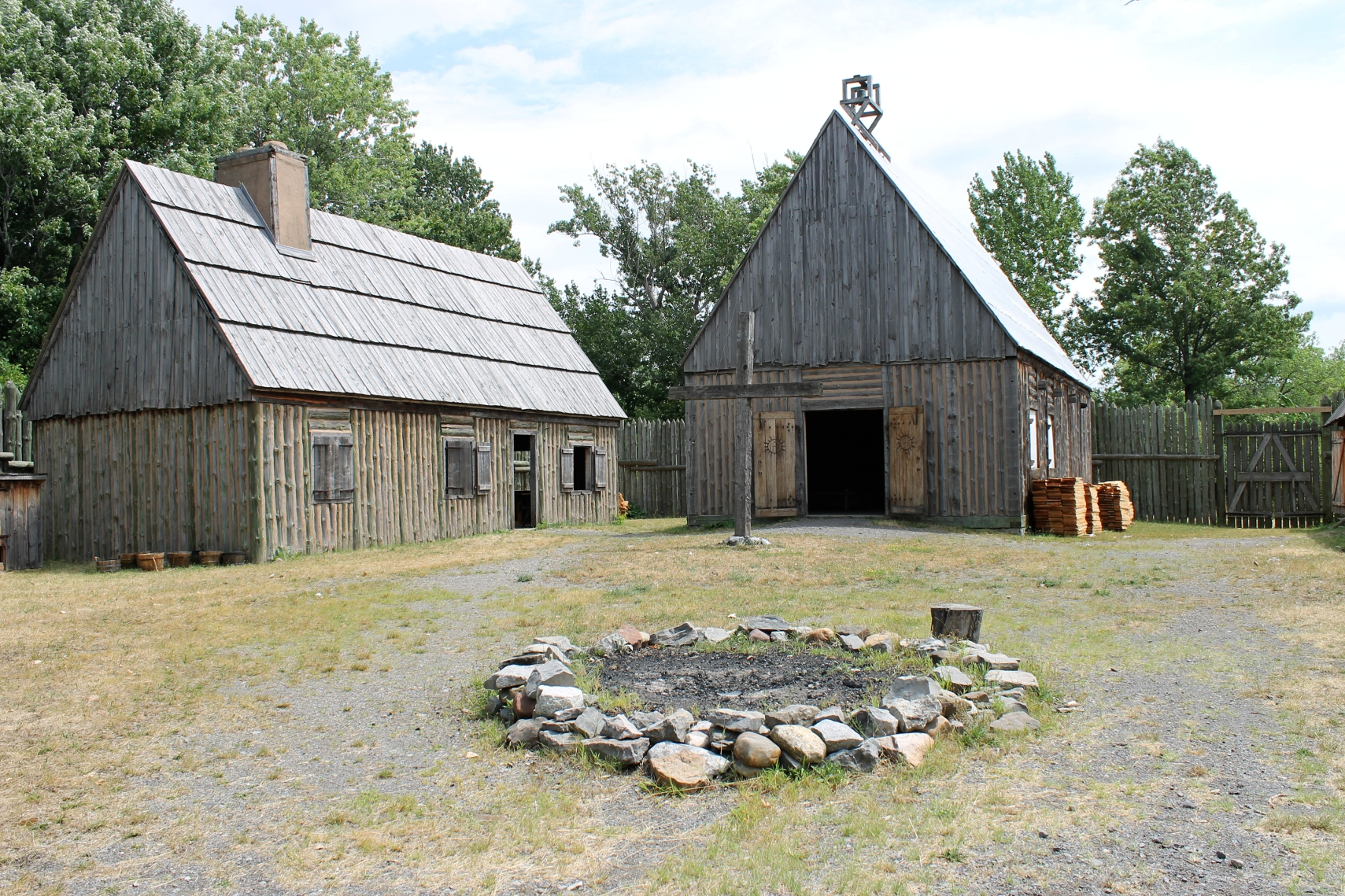
Chapel inside the mission palisade.

The Jesuits built the mission at the invitation of the Onondaga nation of the Haudenosaunee Confederation. Due to ongoing warfare between the Mohawks and French in Quebec, the Onondagas were anxious to broker peace between the two parties. The French built a stockade and a few buildings overlooking Onondaga Lake (Ganantaa in one of the local Iroquoian languages). In addition to the Jesuit missionaries and their Doneé servants/tradesmen, a contingent of French Coureur des bois (Runners of the Wood) were sent to defend the mission.

=== Abandonment ===
After two years, the Mohawks threatened to attack the mission, and a new French Governor lost interest in the project. The entire group fled safely in 1658. No further missions in Haudenosaunee territory were attempted by the French.

== Reconstructed mission and museum ==
=== The French "Fort" ===
In the 1930s, a replica of the mission site was built, though it was fairly historically inaccurate. A "wild west" style fort was built instead of a more historically accurate French mission. However, the original palisades (a "spiked wooden wall") deceptively made the mission appear to be a fort. In the 17th century both native and colonial communities used palisades as protection not only against enemies, but also animals and the elements.

It is believed the confusion is due to a passing reference to a "French fort" that a French war expedition, led by Louis de Buade de Frontenac, had built in 1696 on the shore of Onondaga Lake. This "fort" was just an encampment of tents with a small palisade around it and was only occupied for about two weeks. The site that the new "French fort" was built upon was close to the original location since the original was covered by the parking lot of LeMoyne Manor.

Starting in the 1970s it was run by Onondaga County Parks with costumed interpreters who portrayed the French and Haudenosaunee who had lived there. The style of interpretation was 3rd-person, meaning that the people portraying the characters dressed like the characters they represented, but spoke of them in the (third-person).

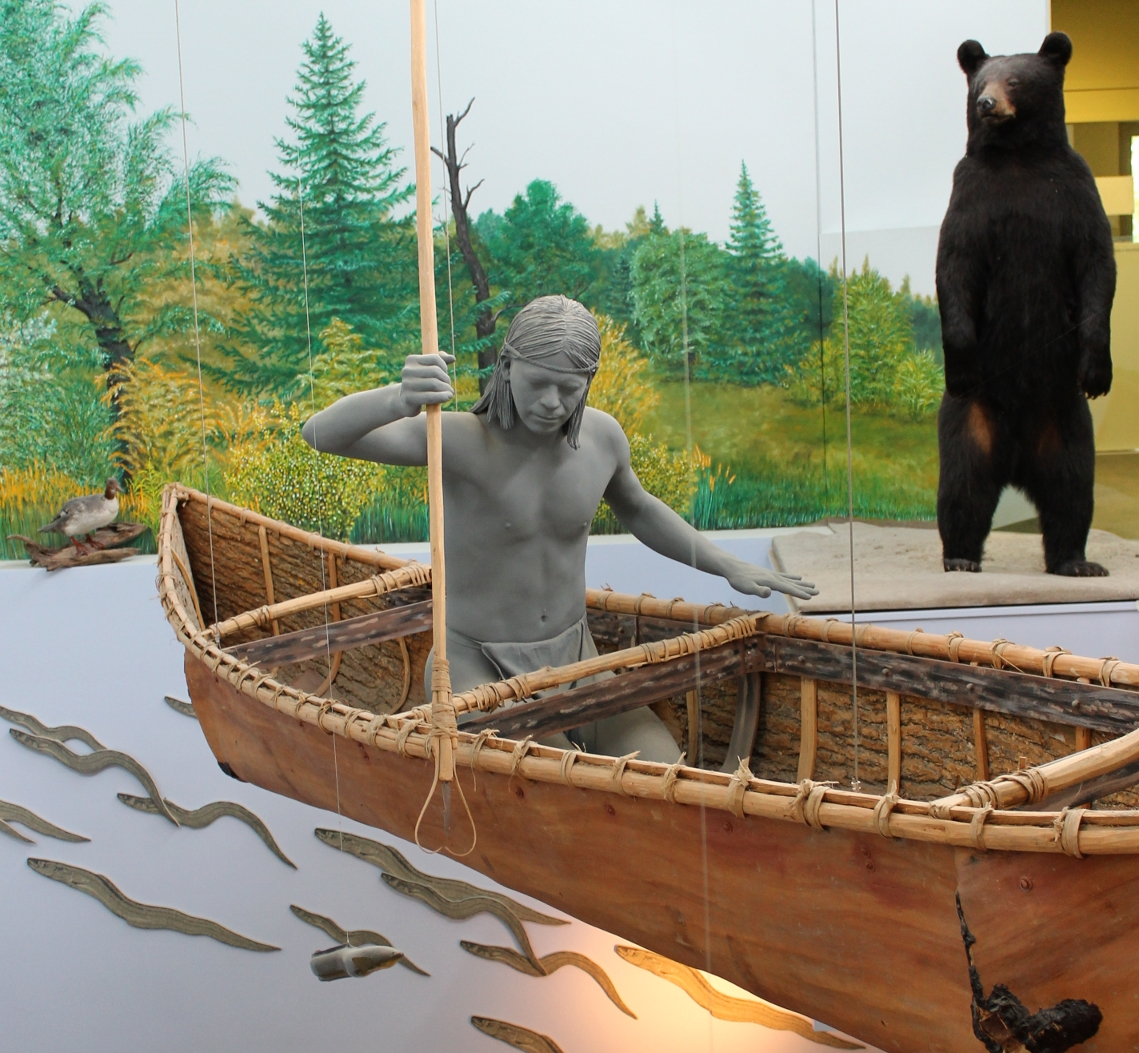
An Onondaga man spears one of the once-plentiful eels from an elm-bark canoe in a display at the Sainte Marie Mission Interpretive Center

=== Museum redesign ===
It was updated in the 1990s to make it more historically accurate to the original French Jesuit Mission.

Money was raised along with grants, such as from the LWCF (Land and Water Conservation Fund), to fund the massive undertaking. The design was planned using research gathered from the Jesuit Relations, other first-hand accounts, and the design of Sainte Marie's sister mission - Sainte Marie among the Hurons. While the more historically accurate mission site was much smaller than the "French Fort", an interpretive center/museum was also built. This allowed Sainte Marie to have a variety of displays about Native and French culture ca. 1650.

=== Closing and reopening of the museum ===
By the early 2000s Sainte Marie was closed. This was due to waning public attendance (due to the mission never changing its programming) and budget cuts. However, a dedicated grassroots movement began to petition for the re-opening of the site. The Friends of Historic Onondaga Lake (FoHOL) formed as a non-profit volunteer based fund-raising organization that offered to run the site for the county. In 2004 Onondaga County Parks formed an agreement with FoHOL that the organization's volunteers would run the site, provide programming, and raise money to fund such endeavors. In return the County would allow the use of the facility, access to the museum's collection, and provide utilities/maintenance.

The volunteers worked to replace the displays, some of which had been moved to other museums, and redesign the layout. It was also decided that the interpretive aspect of the museum would become 3rd-person. This allowed the volunteers, and the museum itself, to have some latitude in providing tours to the public. It meant that the tour guides could discuss what happened after the mission was abandoned, offer new/changing programming, and to tailor their tours to the interests of the groups who came.

The organization stated that in 2008 it "lacked funds, community enthusiasm, profit centers, partnerships, financial support and fundamental managerial know-how."

=== Museum closure ===
In 2011, the museum and mission site were temporarily closed to the public. This was due to the Onondaga County Parks, led by the Parks Commissioner William Lansley, County Executive Joanne Moahoney, and retiring Onondaga County Legislature Chair James Rhinehart seeking to turn half of the second floor display area into rentable offices for the Onondaga County Soil & Water Conservation District.

However, New York State has said that the parkland upon which the facility is on is protected by the LWCF (Land and Water Conservation Fund), due to the fund money used in the construction of the museum/visitor center and thus designated for recreational park use only. In order for the Onondaga County Soil and Water Conservation District to move into the planned rentable space, an Alienation Act, related to Alienation (property law), must be passed in the New York State Senate and Assembly. Despite this, Matthew J. Millea, the Deputy County Executive for Physical Services for the Mahoney administration, insisted that the current project did not need to follow the LWCF.

Due to the closure, and the locks being changed on the volunteers who provide all of the museum's programming, the popular Christmas Around the World event was canceled along with all other planned events.

== Skä•noñh - Great Law of Peace Center ==
According to Onondaga County Parks, "As of January 1, 2013, the Onondaga Historical Association (OHA) took over management of the Onondaga County facility formerly known as 'Sainte Marie among the Iroquois' located on the eastern shore of Onondaga Lake. The site reopened in November of 2015, having been renamed the Skä•noñh Center – Great Law of Peace Center, a Haudenosaunee (Iroquois) Heritage Site. Skä•noñh, pronounced like "Skah-no," is an Onondaga welcoming greeting meaning Peace and Wellness."

== See also ==
- New France
- Society of Jesus
- Haudenosaunee
- History of New York (state)
- List of Jesuit sites
- Onondaga Lake
- Sainte-Marie among the Hurons
