= Oakwood Cemetery (Syracuse, New York) =

- U.S. National Register of Historic Places
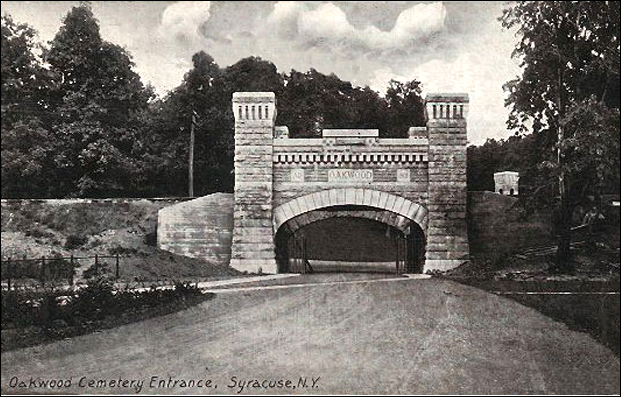
- Oakwood Cemetery – 1909

- Location within New York
- Location: 940 Comstock Avenue; Syracuse, New York, United States
- Coordinates: 43°01′53″N 76°08′08″W
- Area: 160 acres (65 ha)
- Built: 1859
- Architect: Howard Daniels
- Website: http://www.oakwoodofsyracuse.com/
- NRHP reference No.: 91000522
- Added to NRHP: May 9, 1991

Oakwood Cemetery is a 160-acre (65 ha) historic cemetery located in Syracuse, New York, United States. It was designed by Howard Daniels and built in 1859. Oakwood Cemetery was created during a time period in the nineteenth century when the rural cemetery was becoming a distinct landscape type, and is a good example of this kind of landscape architecture.

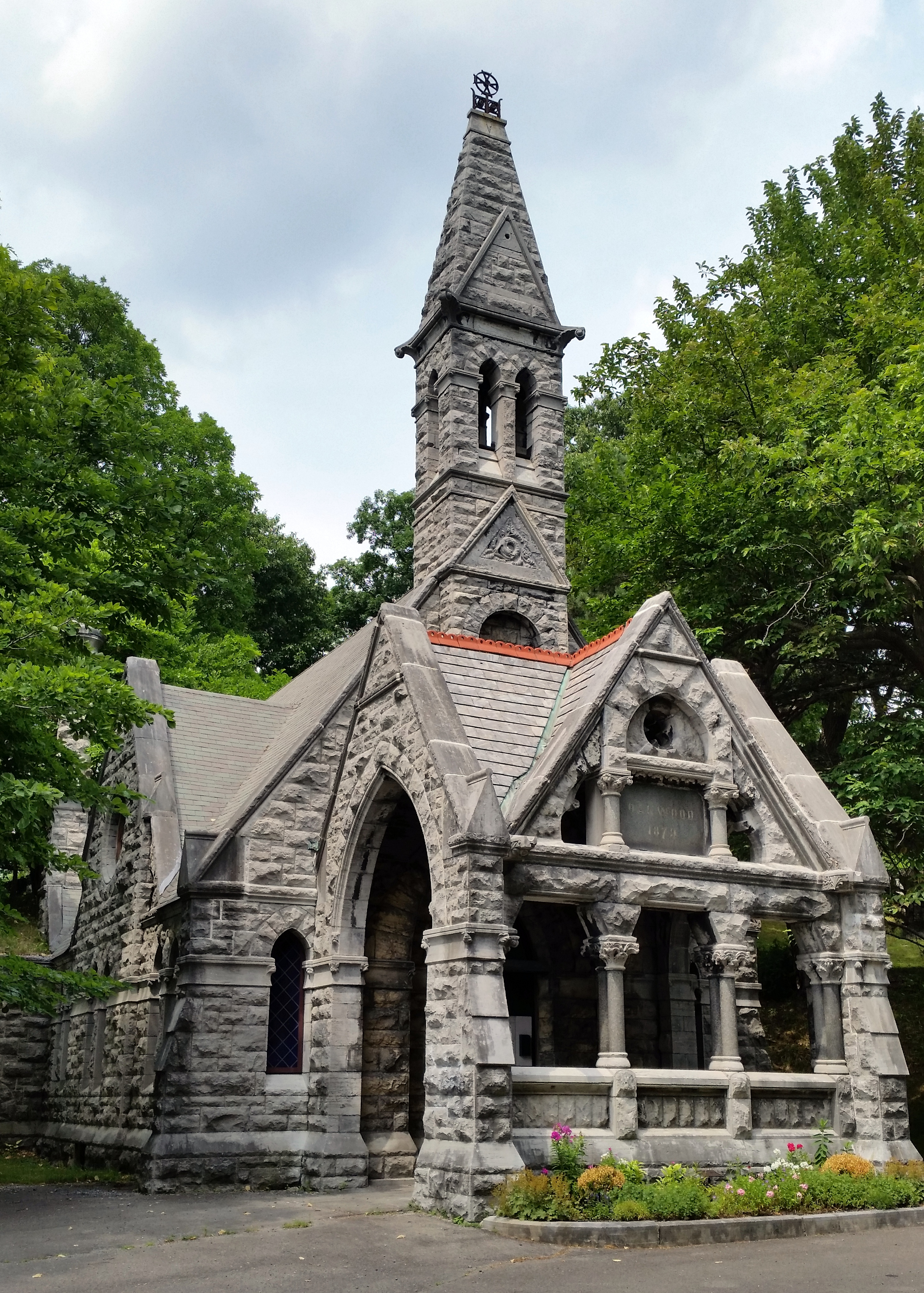
Mortuary chapel, designed by J. L. Silsbee, Oakwood Cemetery (2016)

The original 92 acres (37 ha) included about 60 acres (24 ha) of dense oak forest with pine, ash, hickory and maple. A crew of 60 laborers without large-scale earth moving equipment thinned and grouped the trees; today there are many 150-year-old specimens. Students of SUNY-ESF and Syracuse University, whose campuses are adjacent to Oakwood, can regularly be seen in the cemetery for instruction on plant species, capturing insect specimens, cemetery studies, or mammal surveys.

== History ==
Oakwood was an immediate success after its dedication in November 1859. Thousands of visitors led to the establishment of horse-drawn omnibus service directly to the cemetery gates. Additions to the original acreage were laid out in a manner sympathetic to the original design. The Oakwood Cemetery project, run by Syracuse University libraries, digitizes and preserves valuable cemetery records.

== Notable interments ==
Notable interments at Oakwood Cemetery include:

- Anna Short Harrington (1897–1955), Working at the time as A Syracuse house maid, Anna Was discovered by “Quaker Oats Co." in 1935 while cooking her locally famous pancake recipe at the Syracuse state fair, at which time she became the marketing face of “Aunt Jemima”; An institutionally racist depiction of the “Mammy”-stereotype, used as a marketing tool.
- Charles Andrews (1827–1918), chief judge of the NY Court of Appeals
- Edward Gayer Andrews (1825–1907), a bishop of the Methodist Episcopal Church
- Maltbie D. Babcock (1858–1901), 19th-century clergyman and author
- Union Major General Henry A. Barnum (1833–1892), recipient of the Medal of Honor
- Willis B. Burns (1851–1915), businessman, Mayor of Syracuse, member of the New York State Assembly
- George F. Comstock (1811–1892), lawyer, politician, and judge, previous owner of the land tract where the cemetery stands
- Stephen D. Dillaye (1820–1884), politician, lawyer, journalist
- Herbert H. Franklin (1866–1956), American automobile magnate, businessman and industrialist
- Amos P. Granger (1789–1866), became a general following the War of 1812
- John A. Green, a Utica native who served as brigadier general in the Civil War
- William Jervis Hough (1795–1869), attorney, a general in the New York Militia of Cazenovia, 8th Cavalry Regiment, and a representative in the United States Congress
- Jesse Truesdell Peck (1811–1883), a bishop of the Methodist Episcopal Church and founder of Syracuse University
- Elihu Phillips (1800–1884), member of the New York State Assembly and the Wisconsin Senate
- Irene Sargent (1852–1932), art historian and Syracuse University faculty member
- Joseph Lyman Silsbee (1848–1913), architect
- Lyman Cornelius Smith (1850–1910), American industrialist
- Major General Edwin Vose Sumner (1797–1863) in the Union Army
- Frederick Truesdell (1872–1937) actor of film and stage
- Comfort Tyler (1764–1827), early pioneer in Syracuse, New York
- Ernest Lynn Waldorf (1876–1943), American bishop of the Methodist Episcopal Church
- John M. Wieting (1817–1888), American lecturer and philanthropist

== Gallery ==
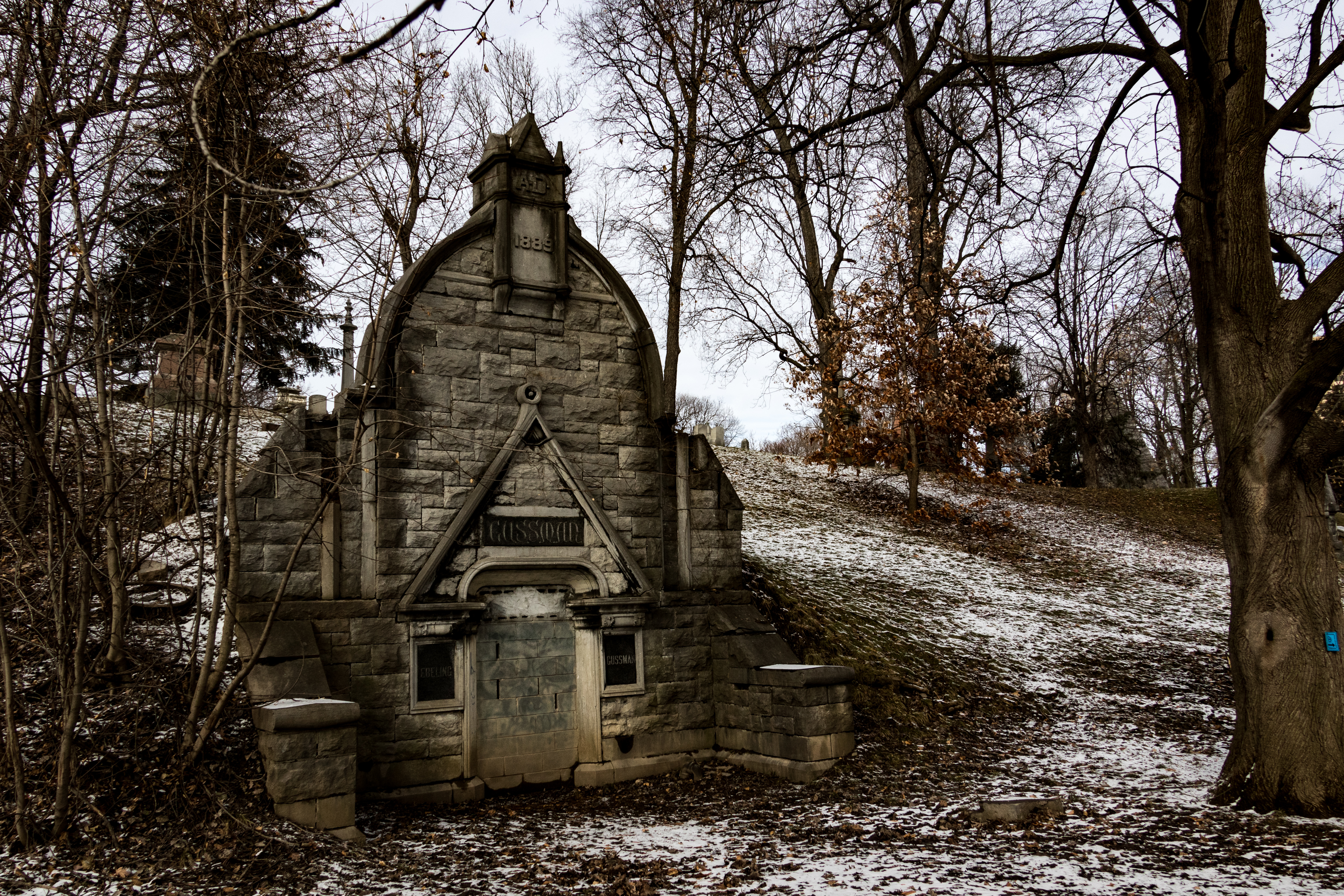
Gussman Mausoleums built in 1889, photo by Charles Poag (2018)

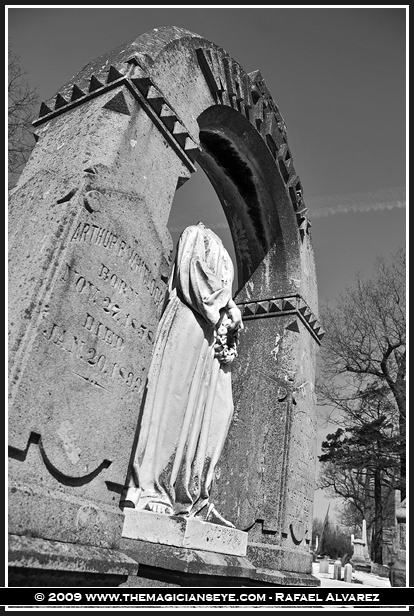
Oakwood Cemetery Syracuse, New York

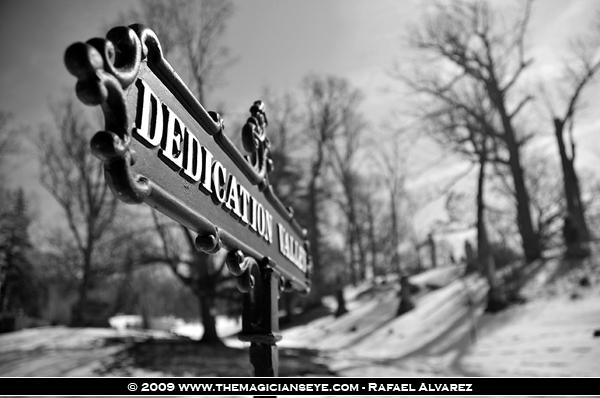
Dedication Valley Syracuse, New York

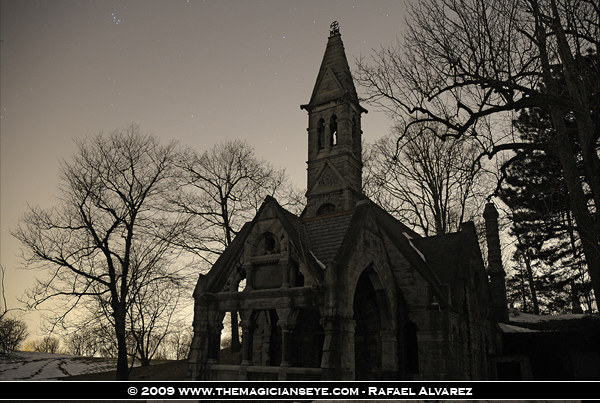
Oakwood Cemetery Chapel Syracuse, New York

The Soldier's and Sailor's Plot

Grave of Lt. Col. Augustus Root of the Union Army. He was killed at Appomattox Court House, April 8, 1865.

Memorial to veterans of the American Civil War.

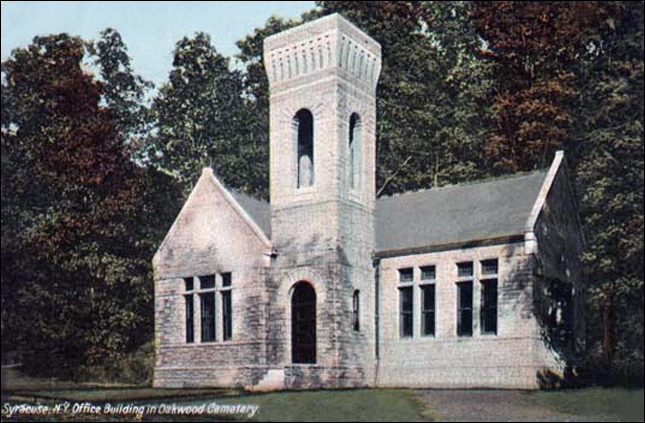
Oakwood Cemetery in Syracuse – 1920 – Chapel

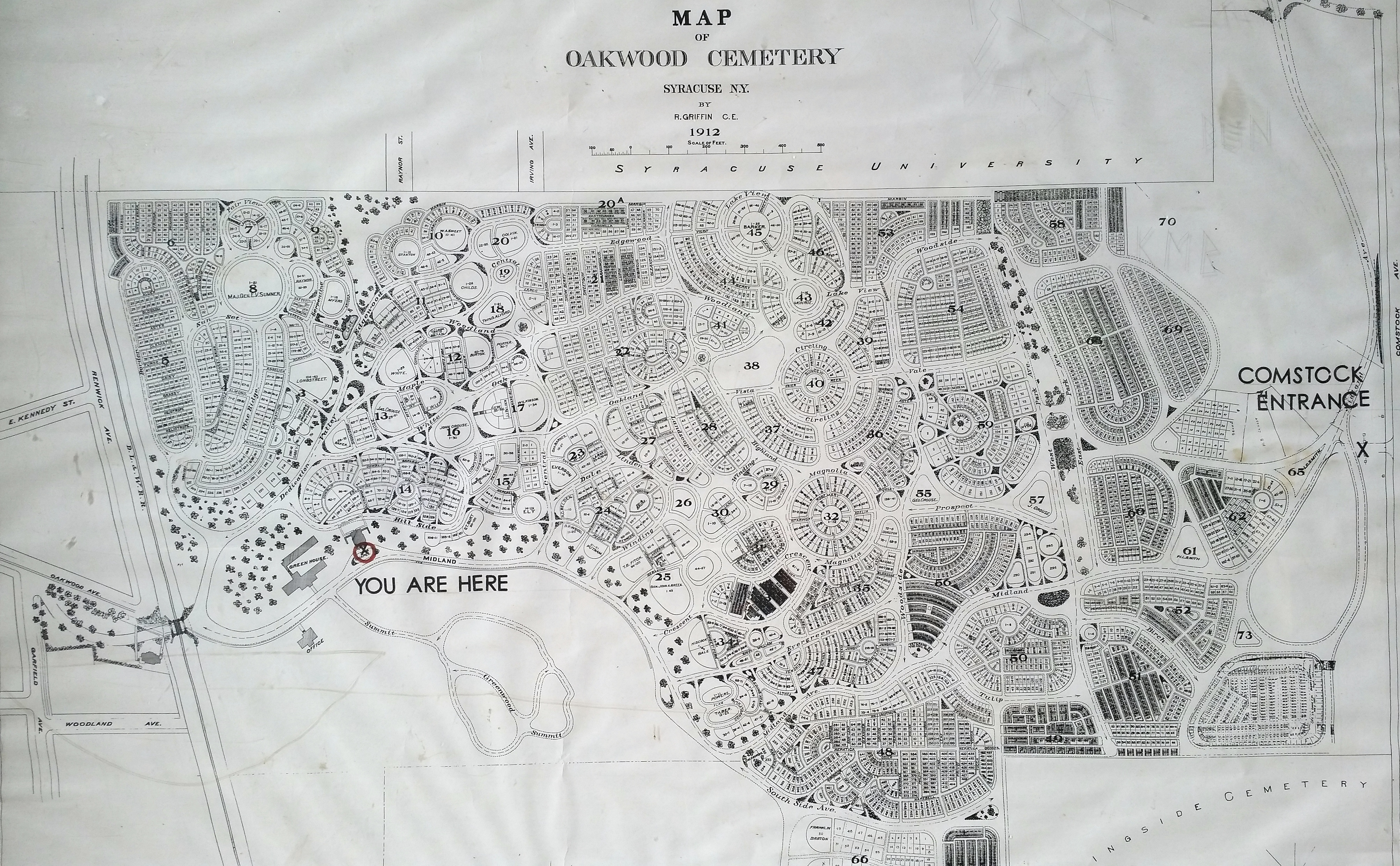
Map (1912), Oakwood Cemetery

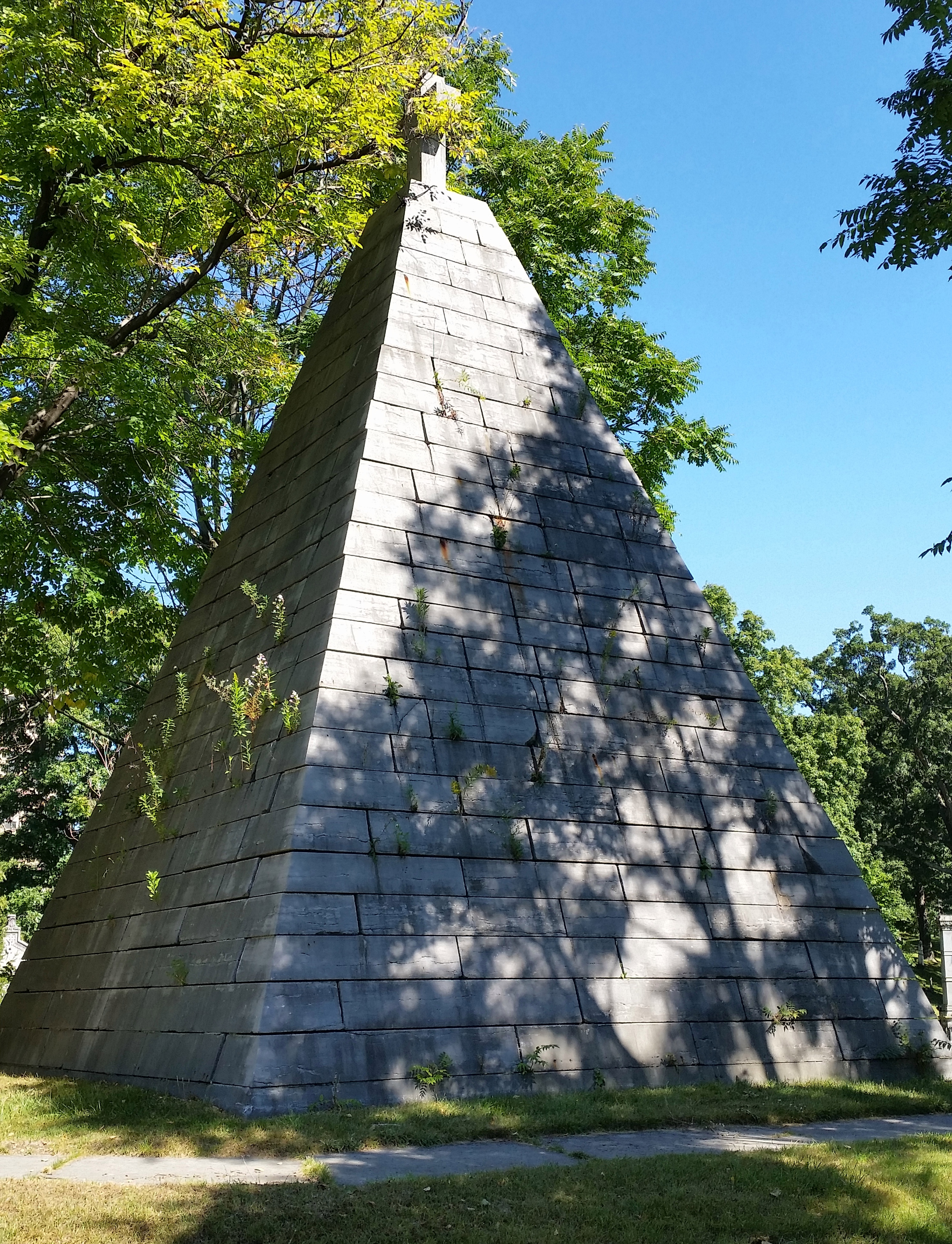
Memorial to Comfort Tyler

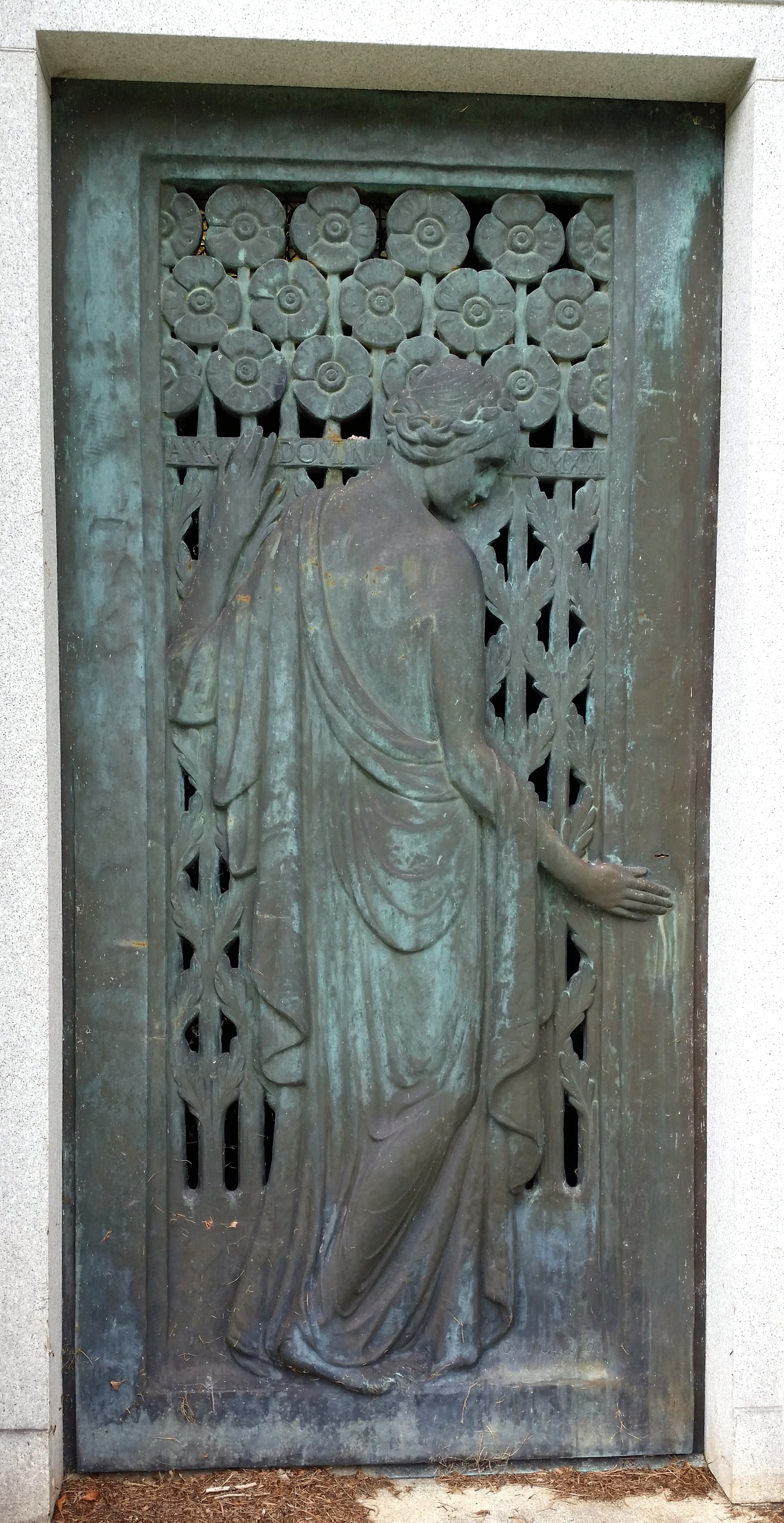
Art Deco bronze door, mausoleum of Charles Edward Crouse

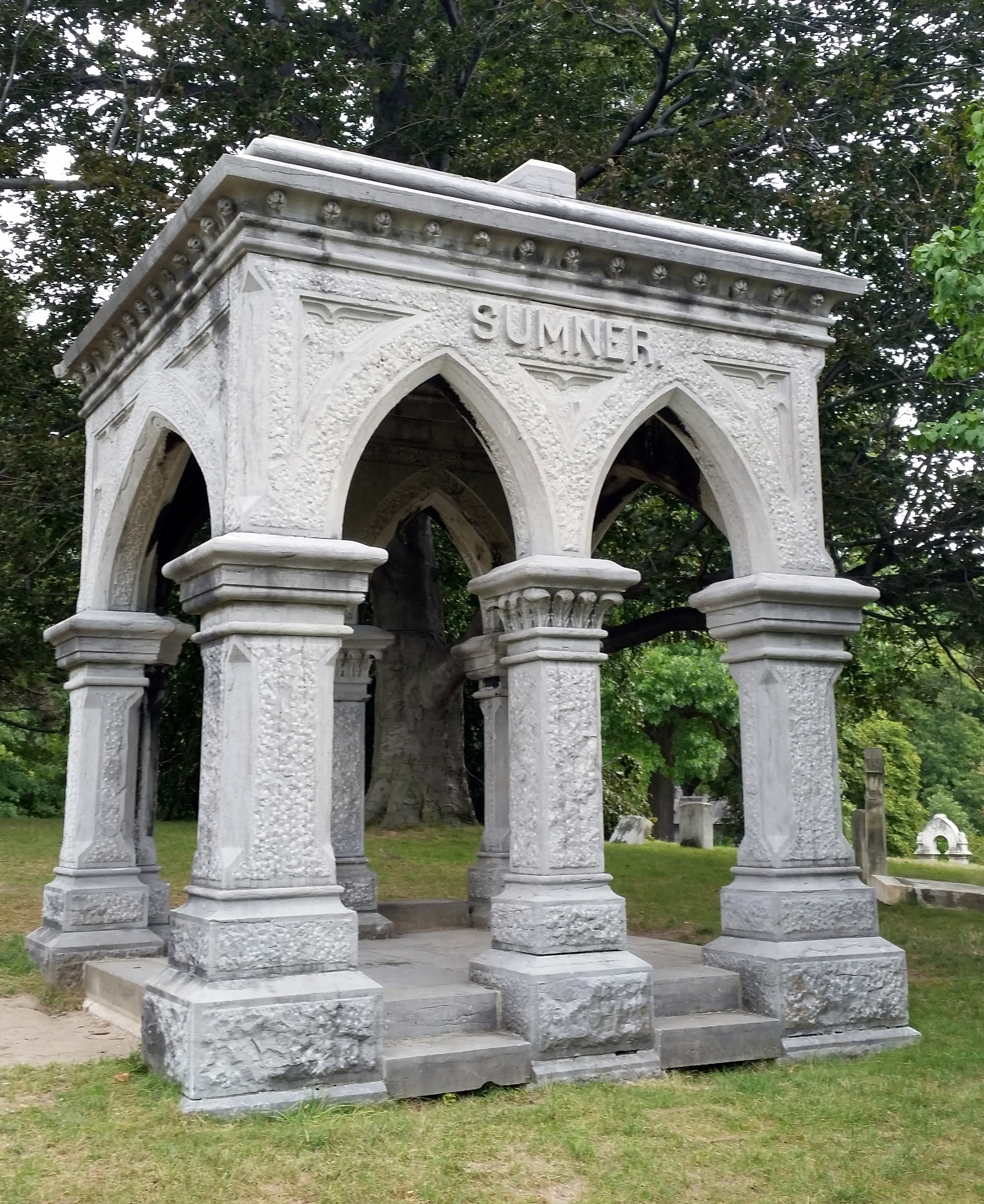
Memorial to Major Gen. E. V. Sumner & wife

== See also ==
- Rural Cemetery Act (1847), New York State Legislature
