= Comfort Tyler =

American pioneer (1764–1827)

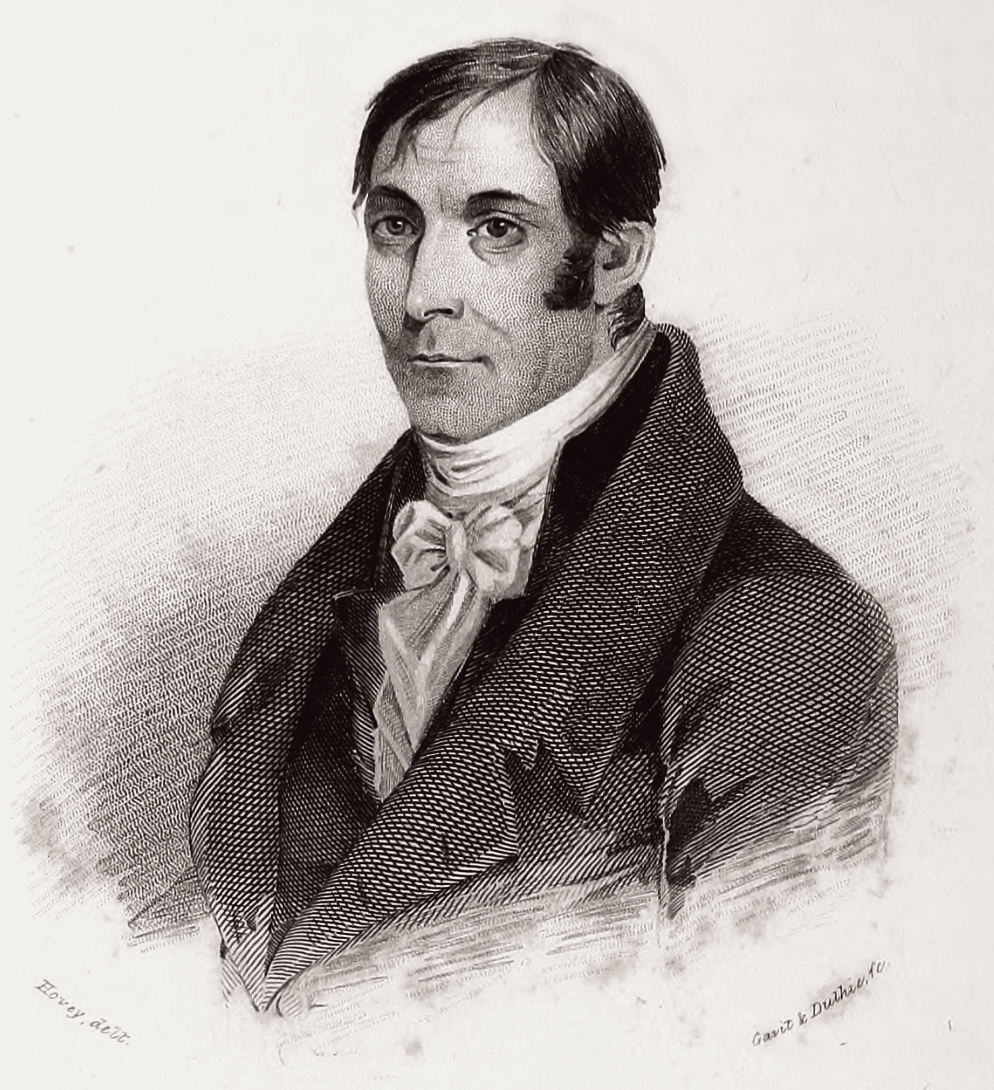
- Born: February 22, 1764; Ashford, Connecticut, United States
- Died: August 5, 1827 (aged 63); Montezuma, New York, United States
- Burial place: Oakwood Cemetery, Syracuse, New York
- Occupations: Early settler, surveyor and engineer, instrumental in the development of Onondaga County
- Spouse(s): Deborah Wemple (died 1785); Elizabeth "Betsey" Brown (died October 21, 1827)

Comfort Tyler (February 22, 1764 – August 5, 1827), one of the original settlers of modern Syracuse, New York, brought his family in the spring of 1788 to what became the hamlet of Onondaga Hollow on the future Seneca Turnpike, south of the city's center today. He joined Asa Danforth and Ephraim Webster, the first whites to settle there, who had obtained permission to live there from the Onondaga. Tyler built the more ambitious house in Onondaga Hollow and contributed his engineering skills to the development of Central New York.

Tyler was a member of the New York State Assembly in 1796, representing Onondaga County, and an unsuccessful Federalist candidate for the 16th congressional district in 1802, losing to John Patterson.
