= Ephraim Webster =

- Born: June 30, 1762; Hampstead, New Hampshire, United States
- Died: October 16, 1824 (aged 62); Syracuse, New York, United States
- Occupation: State agent in land treaties with the Onondaga nation
- Spouse: Hannah Danks

Ephraim Webster (June 30, 1762 - October 16, 1824) was the first Euro-American settler in Central New York when he arrived in 1786 to an area later named Syracuse. For three decades, the Onondagas trusted him more than any other non-tribe member.

Webster was a translator and acted as agent for the Onondagas on several land treaties with the State of New York and was instrumental in the eventual settlement by white pioneers of Syracuse, New York, although the Onondagas later felt betrayed by him.

== Biography ==
Ephraim Webster was born on June 30, 1762, in Hampstead, New Hampshire, United States and was raised in Newbury, Vermont. He was the son of Ephraim Webster Sr. and Phebe Tucker. He had nine siblings. His mother died when he was a teenager and his father, son of Samuel Webster and Mary Kimball, remarried on January 8, 1778, in Chester, New Hampshire, to Sarah Colby Wells, a widow. Ephraim Webster Sr. was very well-written and left an extensive family diary.

=== Revolutionary war ===
In 1777, at age 15, he served as a private in the Continental Army during the American Revolutionary War. During his time in service, he was called on by the commanders of Fort Ticonderoga in New York to volunteer with another soldier to swim Lake Champlain and carry dispatches to General Lincoln near Mount Independence, Vermont. The trip was a distance of 2 miles (3.2 km) and took place in the late autumn when the water was already quite cold. The two soldiers departed one evening and feared they would not make it alive. Webster completed the duty, however, nearly lost his life and had to be rescued by his companion, Wallace of Thetford.

=== Early life ===
At age 21, in 1783, he tried his hand at shoemaking, a skill his father, a tailor, insisted he learn, however, he tired of it after a year. According to his brother, "He seemingly inherited my dissatisfaction with leaving a destiny to a father's whim, and he left to seek his fortune. He tried his luck in the towns of Boston, Philadelphia and New York City, but his fortune was not to be found in a city."

Although he could make a living off of city jobs, Webster a wanted to be a frontiersman and went to Albany, New York, before heading out into the wilderness where he met an Indian hunting party.

In his brother's words;

"My brother wandered about in this fashion until he fell in with the Six Nations about 150 miles (240 km) west of Albany at Onondaga. For the next four years, to his belief, he was the only white man in the area. He adapted well.

Ephraim also became adept with the Indian language, another instinct which saved his life. One night after drinking with a few Indians, he understood them to say they were going to kill him, because they believed he was a man who had, in the past, destroyed their wigwams. Soon two of them came and sat down, Ephraim said, one on each side of him. I can't even imagine his fear when one Indian held his arms and the other took the hatchet and told him that he was going to sing his 'death song' and kill him. However, on reflection, it is true that each of my children had extraordinary strengths and weaknesses, and in Ephraim's life, they were one and the same -- no fear.

Ephraim understood their culture as well as their language, and he motioned as if requesting a taste of their rum for a final drink. He took the cup and drank a toast to their chiefs, naming them in turn, beginning with Brant Buller. This caused great emotion, and the Indian with the hatchet threw it down, by this sign “burying it” forever with Ephraim. “You no enemy, my brother,” he reportedly said, and the man threw his arms around my son’s neck and, Ephraim said, the man then "wept like a child." From that day, they were as brothers. My son often claimed that his Indian brothers would 'go through fire and water for him and would not do any business without his orders'."

=== Settler and trader ===
In 1786, at age 24, he arrived in Onondaga Hollow to make trade with the Onondagas. Webster eventually became the first white person to permanently settle in what later became Onondaga County.

He built a trading post on a bank of Onondaga Creek, close to Onondaga Lake. According to his father, he became accustomed to Indian traditions and made a career off of trading them rum and ammunition."

Webster was married to an Onondaga woman named "One-Eyed Nancy" late 1780s, named so because of how she was blinded by smallpox. They later had a son.

Although he had the trading post on the south shore of Onondaga Lake, Webster was afraid of getting swamp fever, so moved inland to Onondaga Hollow in 1788 and established Onondaga County's first permanent settlement.

In the spring of 1788, Webster used his influence with the Onondagas to get their consent to bring Major Asa Danforth from Montgomery County to Onondaga. Danforth was the second white man to settle in the area. While on a hunting trip in Montgomery County, Webster slept in the barn of Danforth in Johnstown, New York. Webster's praise of Onondaga that Danforth's family and Comfort Tyler emigrated to the county and erected a home in the county.

=== Indian interpreter ===
Webster conceived the idea of locating to Upstate New York during the last period of the American Revolutionary War when he was stationed at Greenbush, New York, and became acquainted with a Mohawk Indian named Peter Gain. He went with Gain to his home on West Canada Creek and spent three months there without speaking a word of English during the entire time. By the time he left there he was fluent in the Indian language. Webster learned to speak or write a total of six Indian languages, and served as an interpreter for a salary of two dollars a day.

According to documents at the Onondaga Historical Association from reports by other pioneers such as Calvin Jackson, interviewed in 1837, who relayed that in 1793 he saw Webster "dressed in an Indian costume and painted (with) a jewel in his nose and ears. Had a squaw with him with one eye and a little boy with them. (They) called the boy William, but (he) has since gone by the name of Harry."

=== Land treaties ===
Webster was a language interpreter for the Haudenosaunee, Onondaga Indian Iroquoian language. In 1793, he acted as translator at treaties where the Onondagas sold New York State an area of land approximately 70,000 acres (280,000,000 m^{2}). This amounted to 75 percent of their original, 100-square-mile (260 km^{2}) reserve which they traded for a $410 down payment.

By 1796, Webster was so well liked by the Onondagas, they were able to convince the governor of New York to give them a square mile of the land that they had sold to the state so Webster could build a home on it. It was the site of the fort built by William Johnson, British settler, thirty years previously. The state deeded the acreage to Webster as "a free and voluntary gift", a reward for acting as a translator for the Onondagas. The property was located in an area later called the hamlet of Onondaga Hollow, which was located on the future site of the Seneca Turnpike, south of the present center of Syracuse.

=== Family life ===
Webster's first Native American wife died shortly after marriage and he married a second time to another Native American woman.

For the Onondagas, the gift of land to Webster carried an obligation and meant that the Onondagas believed he would become a permanent member of their community.

There are conflicting reports of what became of his Onondaga wife, which include him divorcing her, or the possibility that she died. According to Joel Cornish, who served on a trial in a property dispute filed by Harry Webster in 1837, the woman balked at a divorce, but was finally forced to leave. Several historical accounts maintain Onondaga chiefs accepted divorce in instances where wives were accused of drunken behavior. His Onondaga wife, called "Nance" by white settlers, returned to live among the Onondagas with their son Harry and died not long after.

He married a young white woman named Hannah Danks on November 19, 1795, just months after he received his square mile of land. She was the daughter of Captain Isaac Danks and Lucy Danks. With his caucasian wife, he built a home in the square mile on the banks of Webster's Pond in Syracuse. Together, they had five children.

In a 1962 article for the Onondaga Historical Association, historian Richard Wright said Webster gave up the Indian lifestyle on the urging of his newly arrived brother, Asahel Webster.

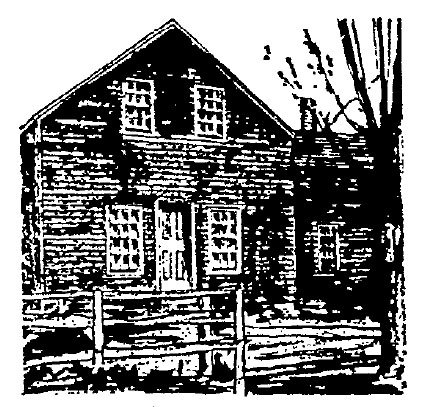
Original home of Ephraim Webster on Valley Drive in Syracuse during the late 1890s

Webster eventually sold the majority of the square mile in small parcels for $9,000 each. The last parcel was purchased by Joseph Forman, a merchant from Troy, New York, who had settled in Onondaga Hollow a few years earlier, for $6,250 on October 18, 1805. Forman was the father of a young lawyer named, Joshua Forman, who later founded the village of Syracuse.

The original family home Webster built stood for many years at Valley Drive in Syracuse until it was destroyed by fire in the late 1890s.

=== Friendly relations ===
In 1795, Webster was elected the supervisor of Onondaga and in 1798, he was justice of the peace. He served as a lieutenant and captain in the New York militia and was later appointed inspector of beef and pork.

Even after he rejoined white society, he was on good terms with the Onondagas, and was appointed as the state's agent to live with the tribe in 1811. He offered Onondaga troops to President James Madison during the War of 1812, and led the tribe in engagements against the British on two separate occasions.

=== Broken trust ===
The trust the Onondagas held for Ephraim Webster was broken in 1817 after he acted as the state's agent and translator for them. In the treaty dated July 28, 1795, Onondagas sold 4,000 acres (16,000,000 m^{2}) to the State of New York for $1,000 and annual payments of $430, along with 50 bushels of salt.

The treaty had a clause that required the Onondagas to give Webster 300 acres (1,200,000 m^{2}) of their diminishing territory, which was not viewed favorably by the tribal leaders. Disagreements over the acreage prompted the Onondagas to accuse Webster of betraying them. Webster had been leasing land from the Onondagas for a decade prior to the treaty. Their dispute was settled when Webster surrendered his ownership of a saw mill he owned located on the Onondagas' land, with the Onondagas agreeing not to pursue any land claims against him.

The Onondagas wanted Governor Clinton to appoint a new agent, however that never occurred. In 1822, Webster acted as the interpreter at Onondagas' last treaty with New York State in which they sold more of their reservation for $1,700.

Chief Leon Shenandoah, who served as tadadaho, the highest position in the Iroquois Confederacy in 1991, said that as a boy, listening to his elders in the longhouse, he heard the old chiefs talk of how Webster would invite Onondaga leaders to his house in an attempt to get them drunk whenever he needed a new piece of land.

The Onondagas refused to part with any more land and were left with 7,300 acres (30,000,000 m^{2}), which they still have possession of today.

=== Later life ===
Webster died on October 16, 1824, at age 62 of Typhoid fever at the Seneca Indian Reservation at Tonawanda, New York.

His will left all his possessions, including $2,000 worth of personal property, a large fortune for that time, to his second wife, Hannah and to their children despite the Onondagas belief that the land should naturally return to them. Some members of the family lived on the 300 acres (1,200,000 m^{2}), later called the "Half-Mile" until the late 19th century. He left nothing in his will to his son Harry Webster.

After Webster's wife died, his son Harry Webster filed a suit in April, 1837 against Webster's family for some of the land inherited by his white half-siblings, however, he did not win.

Harry Webster went on to become the Iroquois Confederacy's spiritual leader before he died on January 28, 1864, at the age of 75 at Onondaga Castle.

=== Familial ties disputed ===
Harry's relation to Ephraim Webster was the subject of debate several for years. In a letter to the Syracuse Herald in 1899, Orris D. Webster, one of Webster's descendants, insisted Ephraim Webster never fathered any Onondaga children and claimed that Harry Webster had filed a "bogus lawsuit"

A lawsuit was filed and the trial began during which time, with Orris Webster not winning the lawsuit and later writing "they were beaten, lost their money and their case."

=== Legacy ===
Webster's Pond in Syracuse, New York, was named after him.
