= Craftsman Farms =

Historic house in New Jersey, United States

- U.S. National Register of Historic Places
- U.S. National Historic Landmark
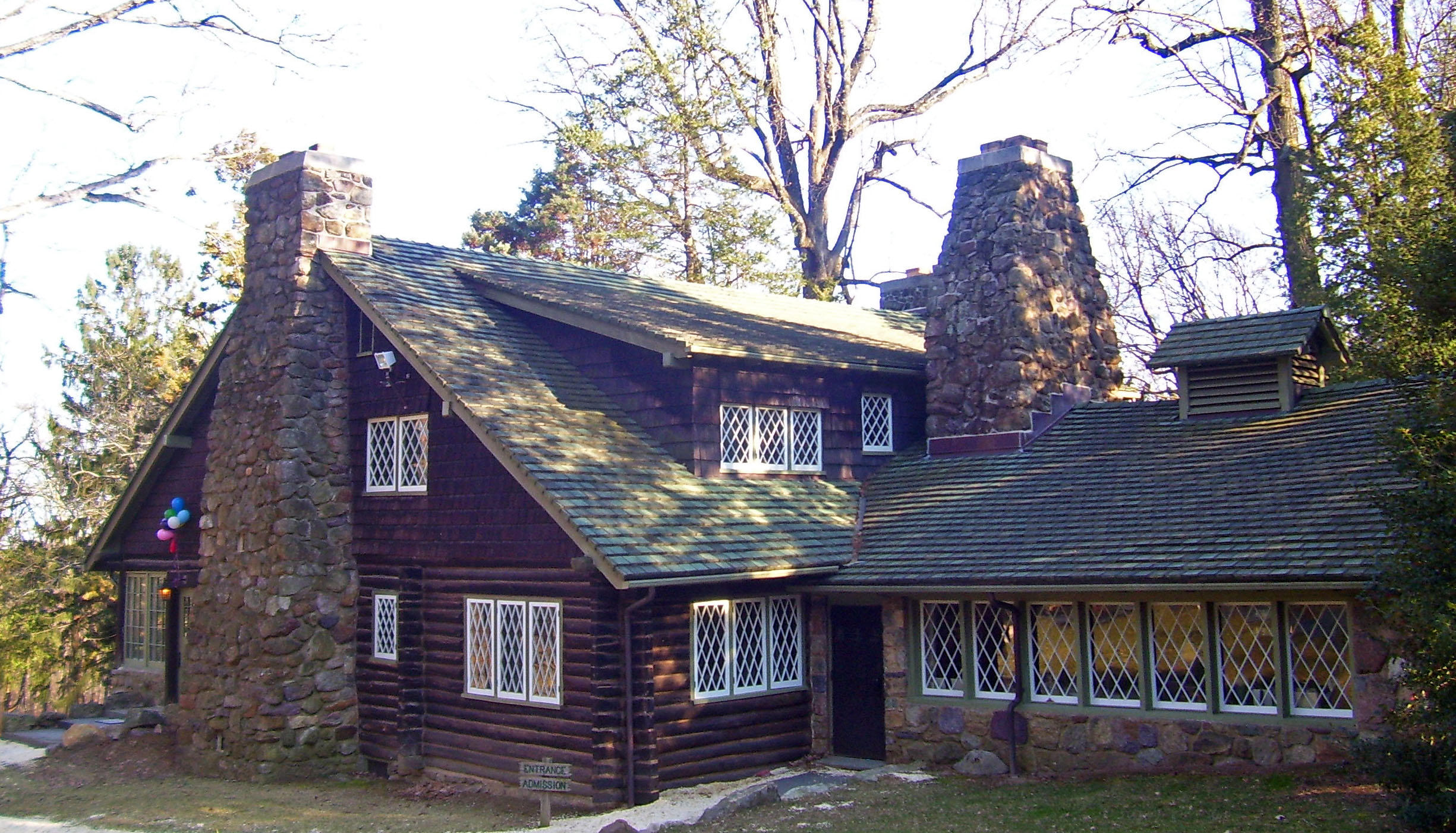
- Main building in 2008

- Location within Morris County, New Jersey Location within New Jersey Location within the United States
- Location: Jct. of NJ 10 and Manor Lane, Parsippany-Troy Hills, New Jersey
- Coordinates: 40°51′22″N 74°28′52″W
- Area: 33.6 acres (13.6 ha)
- Architect: Gustav Stickley
- Architectural style: Bungalow/Craftsman
- NRHP reference No.: 85003730

Significant dates
- Added to NRHP: April 10, 1989
- Designated NHL: December 14, 1990

Craftsman Farms is a historic house located in Parsippany-Troy Hills, Morris County, New Jersey, United States. It was founded by noted early 20th century designer Gustav Stickley as a farm and school for the Arts and Crafts movement. It remained in use until 1915 when it was sold to a family and became a private house.

When threatened by development in 1989, the home was purchased by the Township of Parsippany-Troy Hills through eminent domain. The property is operated as a museum, also known as the Stickley Museum at Craftsman Farms, and is operated by the Craftsman Farms Foundation.

== History of the house ==
Craftsman Farms is a log house built in 1911, and the site, which consists of 26 acres (11 ha) of the original 650-acre (260 ha) tract, has been designated a National Historic Landmark. Craftsman Farms is also an Official Project of Save America's Treasures, a public-private partnership between the White House Millennium Council and the National Trust for Historic Preservation, dedicated to the preservation of our nation's irreplaceable historic and cultural treasures for future generations.

Around 1905 Stickley moved his headquarters from Syracuse to New York City. In 1908 he began acquiring the property on what is now the western edge of Parsippany-Troy Hills, an area formerly part of Morris Plains, where he envisioned establishing a farm school for boys. The focal point of his "Garden of Eden" was a large, log house constructed of hewn chestnut logs found on-site and local stone also found on-site.

Stickley originally designed the main house at Craftsman Farms as a "club house", a gathering place for workers, students and guests. In its huge kitchen, meals could be prepared for 100 people. The living and dining rooms, reaching fully 50 feet (15 m) and warmed by copper-hooded fireplaces, served as meeting rooms. The porch opened to a vista of the farm and brought in light and air. The house is T-shaped, with a one-story kitchen attached to the rear. The large gabled roof is crowned with green Ludowici clay tile and has long shed dormers at the front and back, allowing for light and ventilation in the bedrooms. The house was built with simple materials including wood shingles, logs, and field stones. At first, the house's walls consisted of logs, and now they are painted white. In addition, there are Diamond-paned casement windows used throughout the house.

A separate home for the Stickley family was originally planned to be built further up the hill. When Stickley decided that the school's opening would have to be delayed for several years, he modified the upstairs plans to accommodate his family, consisting of his wife, Eda, five daughters and a son.

Stickley designed Craftsman Farms to be self-sufficient, with gardens for vegetables and flowers, orchards, dairy cows and chickens; the produce grown on the farm was used in the restaurant operated by Stickley as part of his furniture showroom and department store in Manhattan. Stickley commuted to his New York showroom by train from Morris Plains. The property contains numerous support buildings including craft workshops, stables, a dairy barn, chicken coop, other farm buildings, and three cottage dwellings.

Stickley and his family lived at Craftsman Farms until 1915, when he filed for bankruptcy after several years of financial difficulties. By then the taste of the American people that 15 years earlier had embraced the clean, strong lines of Craftsman furniture changed, this time towards the revival of early American and other styles.

In 1917, Major George and Sylvia Wurlitzer Farny purchased the property in the bankruptcy sale and their descendants lived on or owned the property until 1989. After Stickley left Craftsman Farms, the Farny family maintained the farm in Stickley's tradition, adapting certain interior features for modern family life. When the property was threatened with development for 52 town houses, the Township of Parsippany-Troy Hills, with the encouragement of community groups and others interested in the importance of the site, obtained the property through eminent domain.

In 2021, the National Trust for Historic Preservation named Craftsman Farms a recipient of a grant from its Telling the Full History Preservation Fund to aid site interpretation such as guided tours.

== See also ==
- National Register of Historic Places listings in Morris County, New Jersey
- List of museums in New Jersey
