= The Craftsman (magazine) =

20th-century American magazine

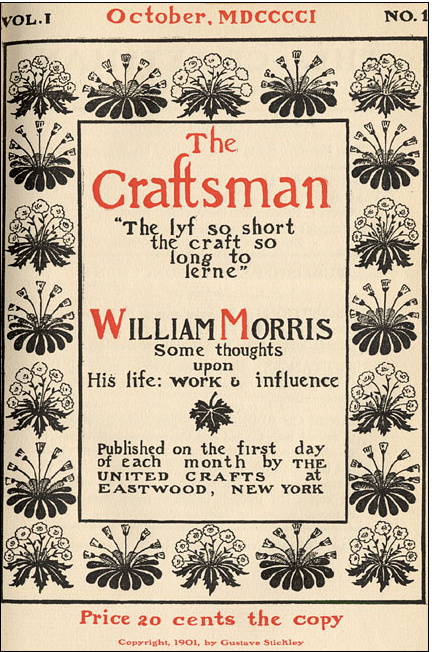
The title page of the first issue of The Craftsman, October 1901

The Craftsman was a magazine founded by the American furniture designer Gustav Stickley that promoted and disseminated the American Arts and Crafts movement.

== History ==
The Craftsman was founded by Stickley in October 1901. A key figure in the early years was art historian and Syracuse University professor Irene Sargent. She wrote most of the magazine's first three issues herself —including the inaugural issue's cover story on William Morris — and thereafter usually wrote each issue's lead article while acting as managing editor and layout designer. Her writings in The Craftsman, along with the architectural designs the magazine published, helped to shape public understanding of the American Arts and Crafts aesthetic and contributed greatly to the magazine's success.

In 1904, Stickley moved the magazine to New York City, and Sargent remained in Syracuse to write for other publications.

The Craftsman put out its last issue in December 1916. The following year, it merged with Art World.

Stickley's own home in Syracuse, New York, became the first home with an exclusive Craftsman interior. Views of its interior and plans were published in The Craftsman in 1903. The house was added to the National Register of Historic Places in 1984. A reprint of the 1903 article in The Craftsman forms part of the NRHP nomination document.
