= Gustav Stickley =

American furniture designer

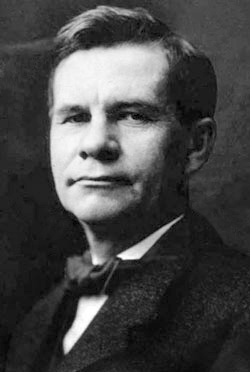
- Born: Gustavus Stoeckel; March 9, 1858; Osceola, Wisconsin
- Died: April 21, 1942 (aged 84); Syracuse, New York
- Known for: Furniture design
- Notable work: Craftsman furniture
- Movement: Arts and Crafts movement
- Spouse: Eda Ann Simmons

Gustav Stickley (March 9, 1858 – April 15, 1942) was an American furniture manufacturer, design leader, publisher, and a leading voice in the American Arts and Crafts movement. Stickley's design philosophy was a major influence on American Craftsman architecture.

== Early life ==
One of eleven children of German émigrés Leopold and Barbara Schlager Stoeckel, Gustav Stickley was born Gustavus Stoeckel on March 9, 1858, in Osceola, Wisconsin. The eldest surviving son, Stickley experienced the rigors of life growing up on a small Midwestern farm, forgoing his formal education in 1870 to continue work in his father's field of stonemasonry and help support his struggling family. By early 1876, Stickley's mother and siblings moved to Brandt, Pennsylvania, where Gustav worked in his uncle's chair factory – his first formal training in the furniture industry.

== Early career ==
With his brothers Charles and Albert, Gustav formed Stickley Brothers & Company in 1883, the same year he married Eda Ann Simmons. Within five years, the company was dissolved and Stickley's ambitions led him to partner with Elgin Simonds, a salesman in the furniture trade, to form the firm Stickley & Simonds in Binghamton, New York. During the 1890s, Stickley divided his efforts between his new enterprise and the Auburn State Prison. At the prison, he and his brother Leopold served as a foremen of furniture operations. In 1898, he orchestrated the removal of his business partner and formed the Gustave Stickley Company (he dropped the use of the "e" from his first name in 1903).

In the summer of 1900, he worked with Henry Wilkinson and, possibly, LaMont A. Warner (soon his first staff designer) to create his first Arts and Crafts works in an experimental line called the New Furniture. In 1901, he changed the name of his firm to the United Crafts, issued a new catalogue written by Syracuse University professor Irene Sargent, and began to offer middle class consumers a host of progressive furniture designs in ammonia fumed quartersawn white oak, as well as chestnut, mahogany, maple and other woods.

== The Craftsman ==
In October 1901, Stickley published the first issue of The Craftsman magazine, an important vehicle for promoting Arts and Crafts philosophy as well as the products of his factory within the context of articles, reviews, and advertisements for a range of products of interest to the homemaker. Lead articles in the first two issues paid tribute to two influencers of Stickley and Sargent's design philosophies: William Morris and John Ruskin.

Nearly all of the first three issues of The Craftsman were written by Sargent, who thereafter wrote each issue's lead article, acted as the managing editor and designed the magazine's layouts. The magazine also featured articles by libertarian socialists.

== Furniture design ==
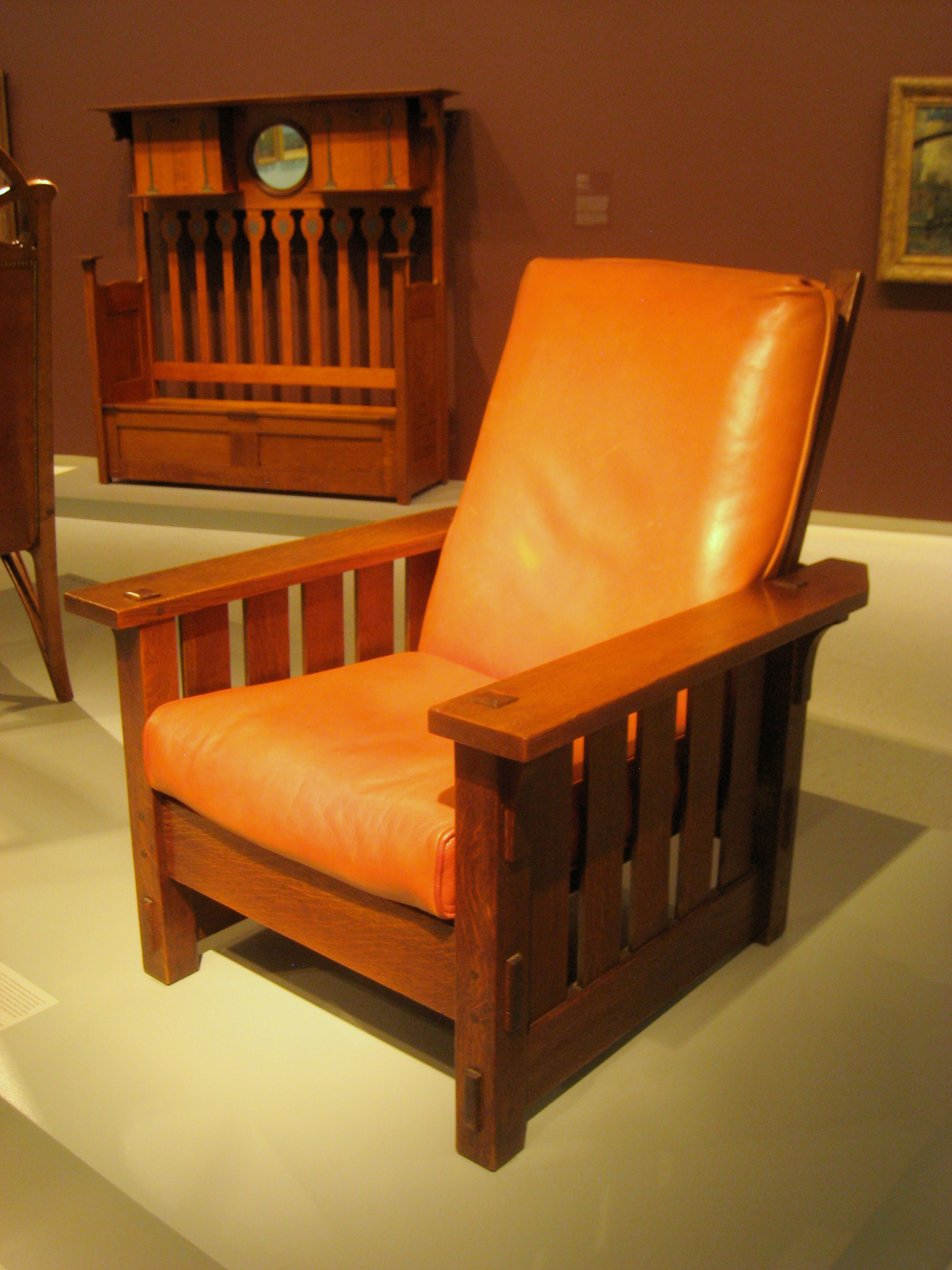
Adjustable-Back Chair No. 2342, Gustav Stickley, ca.1902

Stickley's new furniture reflected his ideals of simplicity, honesty in construction, and truth to materials. Unadorned, plain surfaces were enlivened by the careful application of colorants so as not to obscure the grain of the wood. Mortise and tenon joinery was exposed to emphasize the structural qualities of the works. Hammered metal hardware, in armor-bright polished iron or patinated copper emphasized the handmade qualities of furniture which was fabricated using both hand working techniques and modern woodworking machinery within Stickley's Eastwood, New York, factory (now a part of Syracuse, New York). Dyed leather, canvas, terry cloth and other upholstery materials complemented the designs.

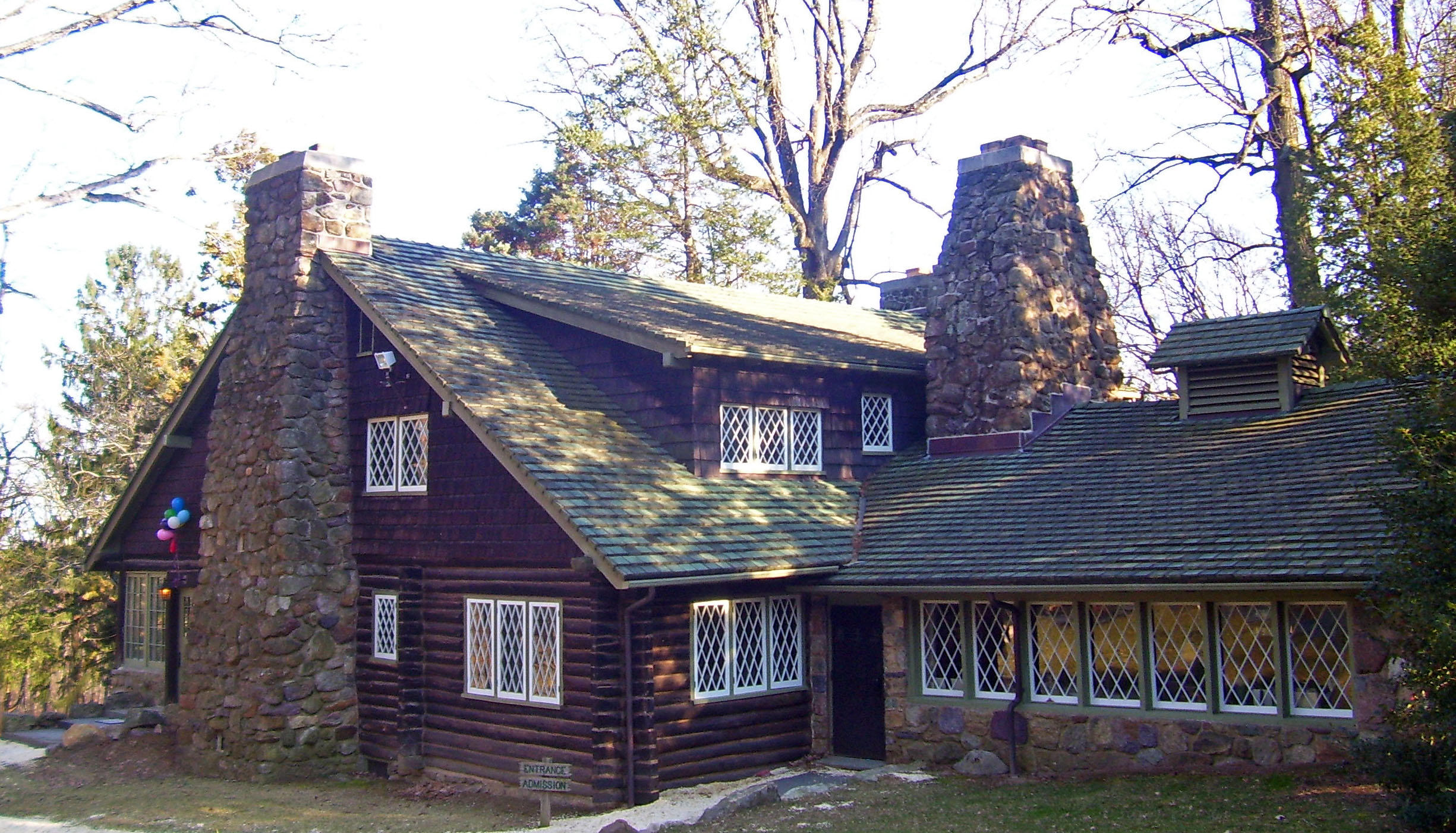
Craftsman Farms

Those ideals – simplicity, honesty, truth – were reflected in his trademark, which includes the Flemish phrase Als Ik Kan inside a joiner's compass. The phrase is generally translated 'to the best of my ability.'

His firm's work, both nostalgic in its evocation of handicraft and the pre-industrial era and proto-modern in its functional simplicity, was popularly referred to as being in the Mission style, though Stickley despised the term as misleading. In 1903, he changed the name of his company again, to the Craftsman Workshops, and began a concerted effort to market his works – by then including furniture as well as textiles, lighting, and metalwork – as Craftsman products. Ultimately, over 100 retailers across the United States represented the Craftsman Workshops.

In 1902, the later world-renowned sculptor Jerome Connor was hired to head up Stickley's metal work department. Architect E. G. W. Dietrich contributed his design and accompanying essay titled "The Cottage Quality" to the February and April 1903 editions of The Craftsman magazine. Then in May 1903, the magazine published the first "Craftsman House" designed by Dietrich in cooperation with Stickley. The article featured a house design and drawings by Dietrich including an exterior view, floor plans, and detailed interior views showcasing Stickley furniture.

In May 1903, Stickley hired Rochester architect Harvey Ellis. Although Ellis died only a few months later, in January 1904, he had an immediate and profound effect upon design of The Craftsman magazine, its architectural offerings, and the furnishings Stickley was producing, reinforcing the connections between Stickley's work and that of English and Glaswegian designers. During this year, Stickley's furniture evolved from solid, monumental forms to lighter shapes, relieved by arches, tapering legs, and – in a new experimental line – inlay as decoration. Within a year the inlay designs would be all but dropped from production save special orders, but the broader emphasis on less massive forms would remain. In keeping with this new emphasis, Stickley also began offering furniture in willow to complement the heavier oak designs.

Furthering the development of his concept of the Craftsman home, in late 1903 he announced the formation of the Craftsman Home Builders Club to provide architectural plans from The Craftsman to its subscribers. The homes were offered in a number of archetypes familiar to American public – the farmhouse, town house, cottage, and bungalow, among others. Natural materials and soft colors predominated and interiors were invariably prescribed to include simplified moldings, stained wood, and characteristic features such as built-in cabinets and fireplaces with inglenooks for seating. Although these homes were only rarely innovative in terms of progressive style, designs reflected current approaches to open floor plans, economy of function, and use of novel materials for walls, roofs, and surface treatments.

== Craftsman Farms ==
Stickley moved his headquarters to New York City in 1905. By 1907, he began to acquire property to establish a boarding school for boys in Morris Plains, New Jersey (what is now Parsippany, New Jersey). Craftsman Farms was designed to include vegetable gardens, orchards, dairy cows and chickens. The main house was constructed from chestnut logs and stone sourced on the property, beneath a green Ludowici tile roof. As he wrote in The Craftsman:

There are elements of intrinsic beauty in the simplification of a house built on the log cabin idea. First, there is the bare beauty of the logs themselves with their long lines and firm curves. Then there is the open charm felt of the structural features which are not hidden under plaster and ornament, but are clearly revealed, a charm felt in Japanese architecture. ... The quiet rhythmic monotone of the wall of logs fills one with the rustic peace of a secluded nook in the woods.

Although the main house at Craftsman Farms was initially conceived of as a clubhouse for students, lack of interest in the school prompted Stickley to live there with his family instead. The planned school never became a reality. By 1913, changing tastes and the financial strain of his new twelve-story Craftsman Building in Manhattan, conceived as a department store, began to take their toll; in 1915 he filed for bankruptcy, stopping publication of The Craftsman in December 1916 and selling Craftsman Farms in 1917.

== Legacy ==
Gustav Stickley died on April 21, 1942. He is buried in the Oakwood Cemetery in Syracuse, New York.

In recent decades, Stickley and his work have become popularly recognized once again. It is particularly his early furniture, produced between 1900 and 1904, that is often seen as appealing to collectors. In 1988, Barbra Streisand paid $363,000 for a Stickley sideboard from the Gustav Stickley House in Syracuse. An article written by the Associated Press stated that "Streisand's telephone bid on the 1903 sideboard set a record for a Stickley piece and for a single piece of American Arts and Crafts movement furniture." During an auction in 1999, Streisand sold that same sideboard for $540,000 to a then-unnamed buyer; the sideboard subsequently appeared within the collection of the Two Red Roses Foundation. An article written by CBS News stated that "the winning bid set a [auction] record for a piece of furniture from the Arts and Crafts movement." Magazines such as Style 1900 (out of print as of January 2013) and American Bungalow cater to those interested in the Arts and Crafts movement. A major touring exhibition organized by the Dallas Museum of Art, Gustav Stickley and the American Arts & Crafts Movement, opened at the Newark Museum on September 15, 2010. The exhibition then opened at the Dallas Museum of Art on February 18, 2011, and remained on view until May 8, 2011, before opening at the San Diego Museum of Art on June 18, 2011, subsequently closing on September 11, 2011.

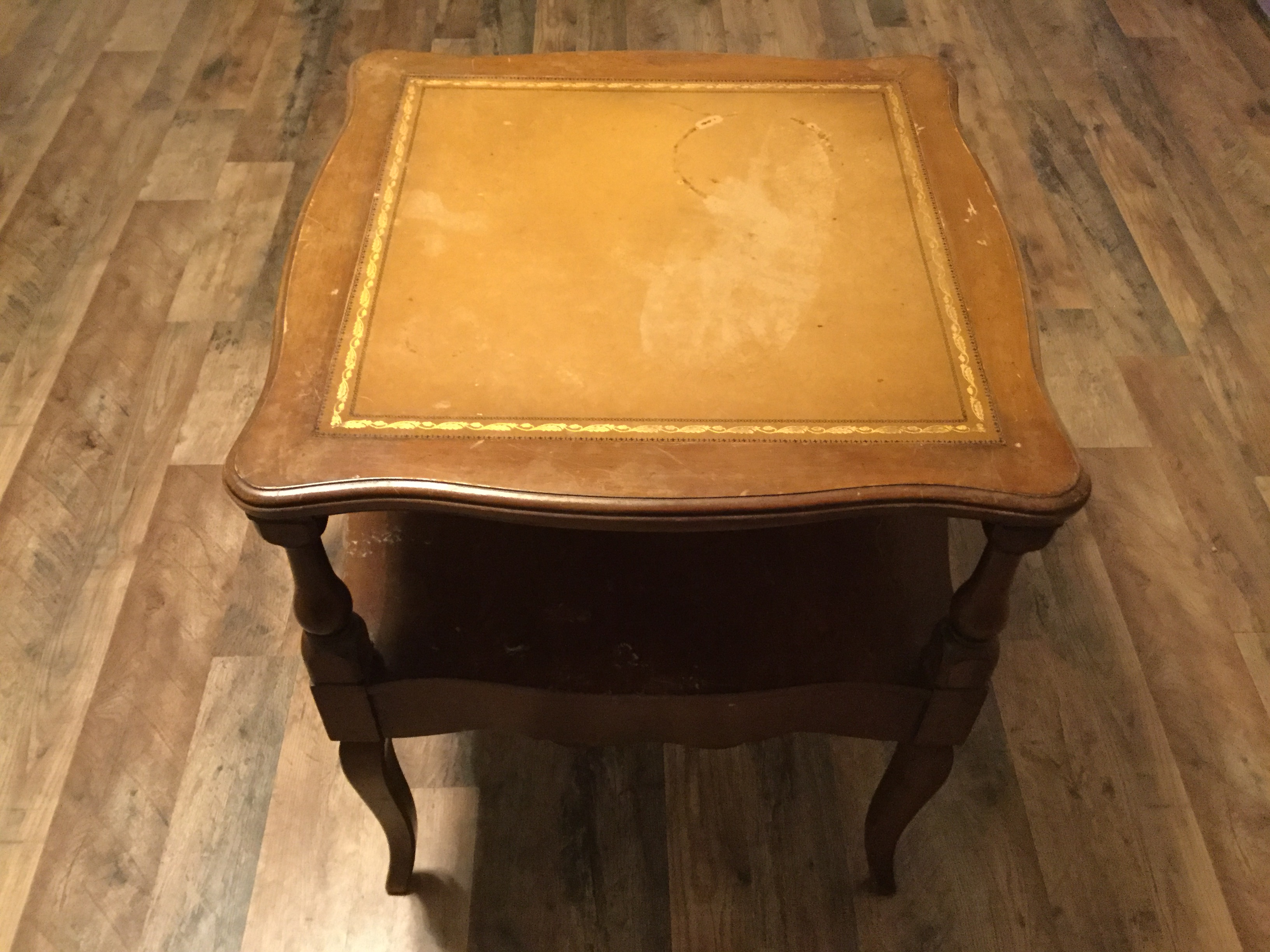
Stickley Brothers Furniture Company of Grand Rapids end table

Gustav's brothers Leopold Stickley (Lee), Albert Stickley, Charles Stickley and John George Stickley also produced Arts and Crafts furniture. Albert Stickley and John George Stickley founded the Stickley Brothers Furniture Company of Grand Rapids in 1891. The Grand Rapids company ceased production in the 1950s. Although no longer held by the Stickley family, the successor firm to the L. & J. G. Stickley Company continues to operate in Manlius, New York, producing a variety of styles, including many original Gustav Stickley Arts and Crafts designs. The Company operates a museum, located in the original L & J. G. factory building. It features the work of the Stickley brothers and is located near its current factory site.

== See also ==
- Arts and Crafts movement
- Craftsman Farms, Parsippany, New Jersey
- Gustav Stickley House, Syracuse, New York
