= English surnames of Norse origin =

Much of the north of 9th century England was occupied by Norse invaders, who left behind descendants with Norse surnames.

Norse invaders ruled much of northern England, in the 9th and 10th centuries, and left English surnames of Norse origin in the area now called the Danelaw.

According to Origins of English Surnames and A Dictionary of English and Welsh Surnames: With Special American Instances, English surnames that have their source in the language of the Norse invaders include: Algar, Allgood, Bond, Bushby, Carr, Collings, Dowsing, Drabble, Eanes, Eetelbum, Fell, Gamble, Goodman, Grime, Gunn, Hacon, Harold, Hemming, Hobson, Ketellbum, Kerr, Knott, Kronick, Mainwaring, Mannerink, Orme, Osborne, Osborn, Osmund, Quinnell, Ransom, Rogers, Raven, Rolf, Seagrim, Starbuck, Thomassen, Storey, Thorburn, Thurgood, Tookey, Toope, Toovey, Tovey, Truelove, Tubb, and Turk.

== See also ==
- English surnames of Norman origin
