= Blanchard (disambiguation) =

Blanchard is a French family name.

Blanchard may also refer to:

== Places ==
=== Antarctica ===
- Blanchard Glacier, a glacier flowing into Wilhelmina Bay between Garnerin Point and Sadler Point, on the west coast of Graham Land
- Blanchard Hill, a hill between Mount Kelsey and Whymper Spur in the Pioneers Escarpment, eastern Shackleton Range
- Blanchard Nunataks, an east–west trending group of nunataks, about 16 miles long, marking the south end of the Gutenko Mountains in central Palmer Land
- Blanchard Ridge, a rocky ridge, 520 metres (1,700 ft) high, at the north side of the mouth of Wiggins Glacier on Kiev Peninsula on the west coast of Graham Land

=== Canada ===
- Mount Raoul Blanchard, the highest peak in the Laurentian Mountains, Quebec
- Village-Blanchard, New Brunswick, a settlement in New Brunswick

=== United States ===
- Blanchard, Delaware
- Blanchard, Idaho
- Blanchard, Iowa
- Blanchard, Louisiana
- Blanchard, Maine
- Blanchard, Michigan
- Blanchard, Missouri
- Blanchard, North Dakota
- Blanchard, Ohio
- Blanchard, Oklahoma
- Blanchard, Allegheny County, Pennsylvania
- Blanchard, Centre County, Pennsylvania
- Blanchard, Texas
- Blanchard, Wisconsin
- Blanchard Dam, a dam across the Mississippi River near the city of Royalton, Minnesota
- Blanchard Hall, a building located on the campus of Wheaton College in Wheaton, Illinois
- Blanchard House (Boyce, Louisiana)
- Blanchard House (Syracuse, New York)
- Blanchard Island, an island in the Mississippi River between the U.S. states of Illinois and Iowa
- Blanchard River, a tributary of the Auglaize River in northwestern Ohio
- Blanchard Springs Caverns, a cave system located in the Ozark National Forest in Stone County in northern Arkansas
- Blanchard Township, Hancock County, Ohio, one of the seventeen townships of Hancock County, Ohio
- Blanchard Township, Hardin County, Ohio, one of the fifteen townships of Hardin County, Ohio
- Blanchard Township, Putnam County, Ohio, one of the fifteen townships of Putnam County, Ohio
- Blanchard-Upton House, a historic house at 62 Osgood Street in Andover, Massachusetts
- Fourth and Blanchard Building, a skyscraper in Seattle, Washington
- Mount Blanchard, Ohio, a village in Hancock County, Ohio
- Ora Blanchard House, an historic house in Stratton, Maine

=== Elsewhere ===
- Blanchard (crater), a lunar crater that lies on the far side of the Moon
- Blanchardstown, a suburb of Dublin, Ireland, where many office parks are situated

== See also ==
- 20230 Blanchard (1997 XH5), a main-belt asteroid discovered in 1997 by the OCA-DLR Asteroid Survey at Caussols
- Blanchard Springs Caverns, a cave system in the Ozark National Forest in northern Arkansas
- Blanchard's transsexualism typology, a psychological typology of gender dysphoria, transsexualism, and fetishistic transvestism
- Faulkner-Blanchard, a brass era automobile manufactured in Detroit, Michigan by the Faulkner-Blanchard Motor Car Company in 1910
- Hersey-Blanchard situational theory, a leadership theory conceived by Paul Hersey and Ken Blanchard
- Société des Avions Blanchard, a French aircraft manufacturer
