= Blanchard House =

Blanchard House may refer to:

Alphabetical by state, then town

- Blanchard House Museum, Punta Gorda, Florida, an African-American history museum
- Lamar-Blanchard House, Lincolnton, Georgia, listed on the National Register of Historic Places (NRHP) in Lincoln County
- Blanchard House (Boyce, Louisiana), NRHP-listed
- Ora Blanchard House, Stratton, Maine, NRHP-listed
- Captain S. C. Blanchard House, Yarmouth, Maine, NRHP-listed
- Blanchard-Upton House, Andover, Massachusetts, NRHP-listed
- John C. Blanchard House, Ionia, Michigan, NRHP-listed
- Serna-Blanchard House, Las Vegas, New Mexico, NRHP-listed in San Miguel County
- Blanchard House (Syracuse, New York), NRHP-listed
- Joshua James Blanchard House, Warsaw, North Carolina, NRHP-listed
