= Grimes (disambiguation) =

Grimes (born 1988) is a Canadian musician, singer, songwriter, and record producer.

Grimes may also refer to:

== Places ==
=== United States ===
- Grimes, Alabama, a town
- Grimes, California, a census-designated place
- Grimes, Iowa, a city
- Grimes Township, Cerro Gordo County, Iowa
- Grimes, Virginia, an unincorporated community
- Grimes County, Texas
- Grimes Creek, a river in Idaho
- Grimes Field, a public airport near Urbana, Ohio
- Grimes Airport, a private airport in Pennsylvania

=== Elsewhere ===
- Grimes Glacier, Antarctica
- Grimes Ridge, Antarctica
- Grime's Graves, a Neolithic flint mining complex in England

== People ==
- Grimes (surname)
- Benjamin Franklin Davis (1832–1863), U.S. Army officer referred to as Grimes

== Fictional characters ==
- Frank Grimes, from The Simpsons episode Homer's Enemy
- John Grimes, from the 2008 video game Turok
- Rick Grimes, from the comic book series The Walking Dead and television series
- Stella Grimes, a minor character in the Star Trek franchise

== Other uses ==
- Grimes Manufacturing Company – a former American aircraft lighting manufacturer
- USS Grimes (APA-172), a US Navy attack transport ship

== See also ==
- Grime (disambiguation)
- Peter Grimes, an opera by Benjaimin Britten
- Grimes House (disambiguation), various houses on the National Register of Historic Places
- Grimes Octagon Barn, on the National Register of Historic Places
