= Five Across the Eyes =

Five Across the Eyes may refer to:

- Five Across the Eyes (album), a 1999 album by Iniquity
- Five Across the Eyes (film), a suspense/horror film directed by Greg Swinson and Ryan Thiessen
