= Iniquity Bloody Iniquity =

2003 compilation album by Iniquity

Compilation album by Iniquity
- Released: 2003
- Genre: Death metal
- Length: 70:30
- Label: Mighty Music
- Producer: Jacob Hansen

Iniquity chronology
Grime (2001)	Iniquity Bloody Iniquity (2003)

Iniquity Bloody Iniquity is a compilation album and the final release by Danish death metal band Iniquity, released in 2003, before disbanding in 2004. The first three tracks and track 13 and 14 on this album were previously unreleased on CD.

A 20-page booklet also came with the album, it contains photos of the band, a complete discography (including demos) with pictures of each album, and there is a quote from a band member or friend on every page.

== Track listing ==
1. "Revel in Cremation" (from Revel in Cremation 7" single) - 4:46
2. "Madman of the Trade" (from Revel in Cremation 7" single) - 5:20
3. "Extreme Unction" (Pestilence cover) (previously unreleased) - 1:28
4. "Bloodletting" (from Grime) - 5:28
5. "The Bullet's Breath" (from Grime) - 3:50
6. "Inhale the Ghost" (from Five Across the Eyes) - 5:23
7. "The Rigormortified Grip" (from Five Across the Eyes) - 5:21
8. "Cocooned" (from Five Across the Eyes) - 5:08
9. "Desiderated Profligacy" (from The Hidden Lore EP) - 5:24
10. "The Hidden Lore" (from The Hidden Lore EP) - 5:46
11. "Encysted and Dormant" (from Serenadium) - 5:45
12. "Retorn" (from The Very Best Of Progress Red Labels compilation album) - 5:19
13. "Entangled" (from Promo '93) - 3:47
14. "Torn" (from Entering Deception demo tape) - 3:13
15. "Prophecy of the Dying Watcher" (Live recorded at Rock Amar, Copenhagen) (from Brutal Youth live compilation album) - 4:24
16. "The Bullet's Breath" (Live recorded at Pumpehuset, Copenhagen) (video)

== Line-up on different tracks ==
Track 1–5:

- Mads Haarløv - Guitar & vocals
- Thomas Fagerlind - Bass
- Kræn Meier - Guitar
- Jesper Frost Jensen - drums

Track 6–8:

- Mads Haarløv - Guitar & Vocals
- Thomas Fagerlind - Bass
- Brian Eriksen - Guitar
- Jesper Frost Jensen - Drums

Track 9–10:

- Martin Rosendahl - Bass & Vocals
- Jens Lee - Guitar
- Brian Eriksen - Guitar
- Jesper Frost Jensen - Drums

Track 11:

- Brian Petrowsky - Guitar & Vocals
- Lars Friis - Guitar
- Thomas Christensen - Bass
- Jacob Olsen - Drums

Track 12:

- Brian Petrowsky - Vocals & Guitar
- Mads Haarløv - Vocals & Guitar
- Claus Zeeberg - Bass
- Carsten Nielsen - Keyboards
- Jacob Olsen - Drums

Track 13:

- Brian Petrowsky - Guitar & Vocals
- Claus Zeeberg - Bass & Acoustic guitar
- Carsten Nielsen - Keyboards
- Jacob Olsen - Drums

Track 14:

- Brian Petrowsky - Guitar & Vocals
- Peter Houd - Bass
- Morten Hansen - Drums

Track 15:

- Brian Petrowsky - Vocals & Guitar
- Mads Haarløv - Vocals & Guitar
- Claus Zeeberg - Bass
- Carsten Nielsen - Keyboards
- Jacob Olsen - Drums

== Credits ==
- Trey Azagthoth - Quotes Researched & Compiled
- Tom Nygaard - Cover Art
- Jacob Hansen - Producer
- Bjarke Ahlstrand - Digital Mastering, Quotes Researched & Compiled
- Michael H. Andersen - Executive Producer, Quotes Researched & Compiled
- Ossian Ryner - Digital Mastering, Quotes Researched & Compiled
- Phoebus Moreleon - Collage
- Daniel Long - Cover Art
