= Rosalie Sorrels =

American storyteller and musician (1933–2017)

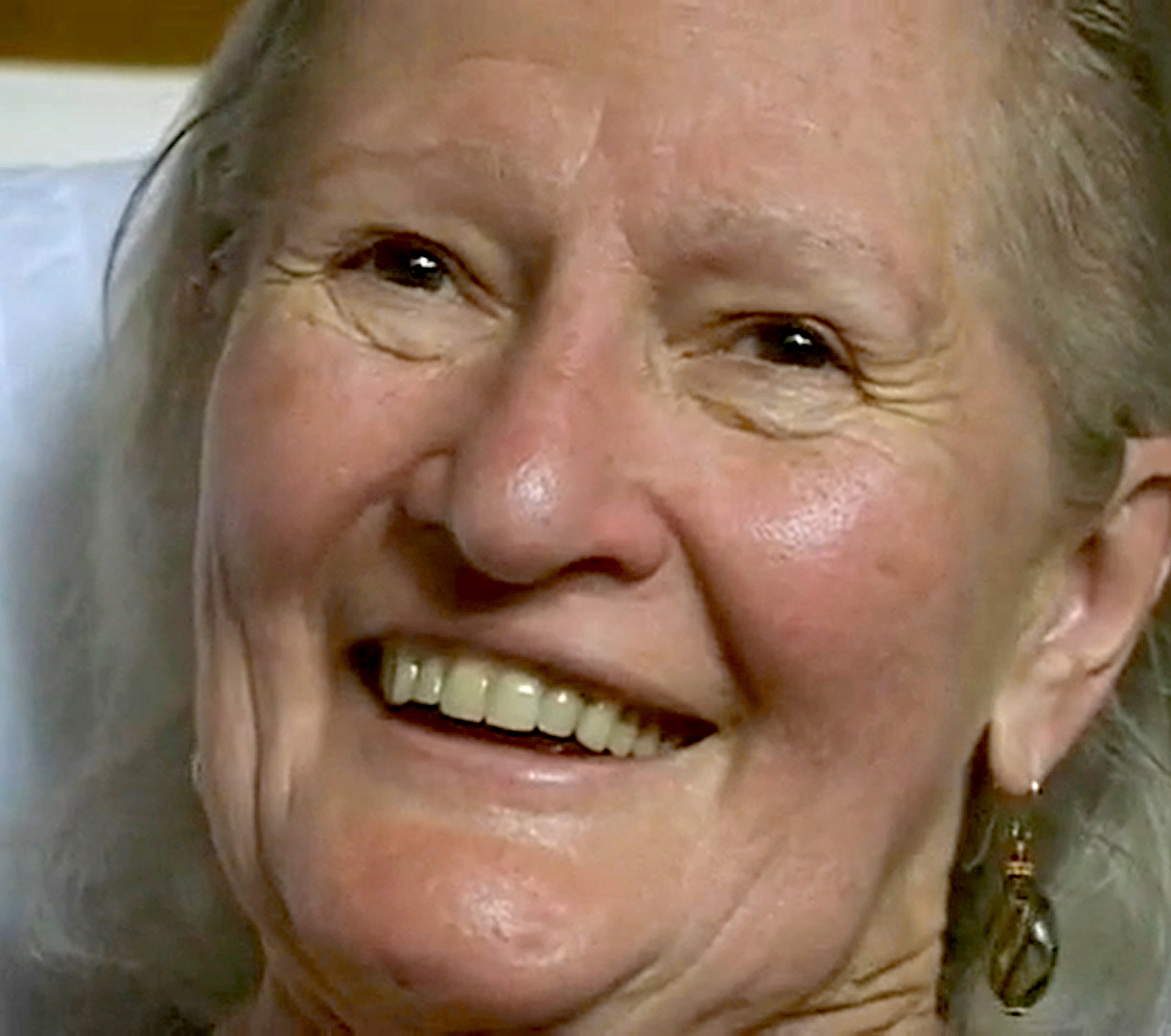
- Sorrels in music is (Speaking Portraits) (Vol. I)

Background information
- Born: Rosalie Ann Stringfellow; June 24, 1933; Boise, Idaho, US
- Died: June 11, 2017 (aged 83) Reno, Nevada, US
- Genre: Folk
- Occupation: Singer-songwriter
- Instrument: Acoustic guitar
- Years active: 1950s–2017
- Labels: Philo; Folkways; Paramount; Green Linnet; Red House; Way Out in Idaho

Rosalie Sorrels (June 24, 1933 – June 11, 2017) was an American folk singer-songwriter. She began her public career as a singer and collector of traditional folksongs in the late 1950s. During the early 1960s she left her husband and began traveling and performing at music festivals and clubs throughout the United States. She and her five children traveled across the country as she worked to support her family and establish herself as a performer. Along the way she made many lifelong friends among the folk and Beat scene. Her career of social activism, storytelling, teaching, learning, songwriting, collecting folk songs, performing, and recording spanned six decades.

== Accolades ==
Rosalie's first major gig was at the Newport Folk Festival in 1966. Rosalie recorded more than 20 albums including the 2005 Grammy nominated album "My Last Go 'Round" (Best Traditional Folk Album.) She authored two books and wrote the introduction to her mother's book. In 1990 Sorrels was the recipient of the World Folk Music Association's Kate Wolf Award. In 1999 she received the National Storytelling Network Circle of Excellence Award for "exceptional commitment and exemplary contributions to the art of storytelling." In 2000 she was awarded an honorary Doctor of Fine Arts from the University of Idaho. In 2001 she was awarded the Boise Peace Quilt Award. She had been featured several times on National Public Radio and profiled on Idaho Public Television.

Throughout her career, she performed and recorded with other notable folk musicians, including Utah Phillips, Dave Van Ronk, Peggy Seeger and Pete Seeger. Oscar Zeta Acosta, Hunter S. Thompson and Studs Terkel wrote introductory notes for her albums. She was strongly influenced by Malvina Reynolds and went on to record several of her songs on the album What does it mean to love? She credits Reynolds with helping turn rebelliousness from a destructive force into an artistic one.

== Early life ==
Rosalie Ann Stringfellow was born on June 24, 1933, in Boise, Idaho, to Walter Pendleton Stringfellow and Nancy Ann Kelly. Her parents met while attending Idaho State University in Pocatello. Her father worked for the highway department and the family often travelled with him as he did field work.

Her father's parents were Robert Stanton Stringfellow and Rosalie Cope who settled near Idaho City, Idaho, on the Grimes Creek property. Robert was an Episcopal missionary working with various tribes and rural churches in Idaho and Montana. His wife, Rosalie Cope, was a photographer and journalist. The Cope family were journalists in Salt Lake City. Rosalie developed a love of the outdoors while spending summers on Grimes Creek. Her mother's parents were James Madison Kelly and Arabel Beaire who married and settled on a farm in Twin Falls, Idaho, where Rosalie was a frequent visitor.

In interviews for a biography of Rosalie, Nancy Stringfellow explained

"She finds something ... in a piece of poetry ... that shines out like a precious jewel, and you can see her cupping her hands and holding it. We all have a streak of that ... We are delighted with words. We're drunk with words."

During high school Rosalie acted and sang in theatrical productions, garnering praise for her performances in the local media. During this period Rosalie became pregnant and had an illegal abortion. The experience would influence her poetry and song. She earned a scholarship to the University of Idaho, but as a result of a rape, she became pregnant and went to a home for unwed mothers in California to await the birth of her child, a daughter. Again, the experience of making the difficult choice of adoption shows in her later writings and music.

Sorrels did not go to college as planned, but returned to Boise after the birth of her child. She acted in local theater and partied with her friends. She recounted that her parents loved her and did not judge her.

== Married life ==
Jim Sorrels and Rosalie Stringfellow met while performing in theater in Boise, Idaho. Jim worked for the phone company as a lineman and was seven years older than Rosalie. The two married in 1952 and his job took them to Salt Lake City where they opened their home to actors, musicians, and poets living or visiting in the area. They had five children. Rosalie joked that Jim married her to get access to her collection of jazz recordings. Over time, her interest in the folk music of her childhood was piqued and she began to study at the University of Utah with noted folklorist, Wayland Hand. She learned to accompany herself on guitar during this period and attended folklore society meetings and seminars.

== Early recordings and performance career ==
In 1963 Rosalie began a four-decade relationship with Manny Greenhill and Folklore Productions. She performed with Manny's son, Mitch, at the 1966 Newport Folk Festival and produced an album in 1967 for Folk-Legacy Records entitled If I Could Be the Rain. This is her first album that included her original songs, as previous recordings contained her renditions of traditional songs she had collected. She and her children lived for a time with Lena Spencer in Saratoga Springs, New York, where she performed at Caffè Lena. She continued working on her craft, and was one of the performers at the 1970 Isle of Wight Festival. Sorrels maintained an active performance schedule throughout the 1970s, 1980s, and 1990s, often touring solo or with close friend Utah Phillips.

Reviewing Sorrels's 1971 Sire LP Travelin' Lady, Robert Christgau wrote in Christgau's Record Guide: Rock Albums of the Seventies (1981): "Though it's reminiscent of many I-gotta-move-babe male precedents, this is the most independent female persona yet to emerge, but that plaintive country quaver begins to wear after a while."

Sorrels was awarded the Kate Wolf Memorial Award by the World Folk Music Association in 1990.

== Song catching ==
There was a strong tradition in both the Stringfellow and the Kelly family to celebrate the written and spoken word. The families encouraged reading and learning for their children and this was passed to the succeeding generations. Writing, whether sermons, magazine articles, or poems, and personal journaling were all activities Rosalie experienced in her youth. She followed the same path, expressing herself by journaling and writing poetry and prose.

Song was a natural extension of this interest in words, and her love of music began early in life as she listened to her father, Walter Pendleton Stringfellow, sing. She had access to a scrapbook of folk songs collected by her grandmother, Rosalie Cope Stringfellow. She began her music career collecting folksongs and performing them, first with her husband Jim in the late 1950s, then later on her own. It was during this time that the Smithsonian Institution's Center for Folklife and Cultural Heritage recorded Rosalie and Jim performing her collection of traditional songs. Many of these have been released by Smithsonian Folkways Recordings in various compilation albums throughout the last fifty years.

Sorrels was a regular in the Utah folk scene in the late 1950s and early 1960s when she and her husband taught folk guitar classes at the University of Utah. She participated in workshops and folk festivals in the area, such as the Utah Folklore Workshop and Festival (1959). In this way she met other folklorists and performers at "song swaps"; as well as formal sessions. Sorrels also was a concert promoter and brought Joan Baez to Salt Lake City the first time in 1963.

== Legacy, retirement and death ==
Folk singer Nanci Griffith wrote a fictional song about Sorrels, titled "Ford Econoline" after the passenger utility vehicle. The song depicts Sorrels escaping an unhappy marriage, driving from Salt Lake City to San Diego with her five children to start a new life as a folk singer. The true part of the story was that Sorrels certainly did drive her five children around the US in a Ford Econoline van as she toured and sang. The song was included on Griffith's 1987 album Lone Star State of Mind, which hit number 23 on the US Country charts. The "rollicking" song was not released as a single, but it was performed frequently by Griffith in concert, including a standout appearance backed by the Chieftains and Roger Daltrey in Belfast in the early 1990s.

Sorrels was a long-established figure on the national folk singer-song writer scene. She was well known for her story telling. In its 2017 announcement of her death, the Idaho Statesman proclaimed "The legendary folksinger also was known for her ability to spin a yarn and hold an audience in the palm of her hand." Strongly identified with her native state, she held a prominent place in Idaho cultural life.

In 2005, health considerations were slowing her pace. By the end of the decade, she had mostly retired to her home on Grimes Creek outside of Boise. Sorrels died on June 11, 2017, at a daughter's home in Reno, Nevada. The Idaho Statesman closes its announcement of Sorrels's passing with her own lyrics from My Last Go Round, a 2004 album.

When my wandering soul shall rest, and my last song gets sung, I'll find the brightest and the best; On my way back home, all my long lost friends and lovers, once again they will be found; And I'll kiss all their shining faces on my last go round.

== Discography ==
The discography for Rosalie Sorrels includes albums in which she is the principal performer as well as tribute albums, retrospective albums, and compilation albums for a theme of songs.

== Books ==
- Sorrels, Rosalie; McCarl, Robert (1991). Way out in Idaho : celebration of songs and stories. Lewiston, Idaho: Confluence Press. ISBN 0-917652-83-5.
  - The Idaho Commission on the Arts asked Sorrels to travel the Idaho to collect the folk history of its people. The songs and stories came from hundreds of people who met with Sorrels at a series of 30 concerts and at song swaps. The book includes contributions from about 200 people of poems, stories, recipes, interviews, historical photographs and photographic portraits. Sheet music is included for 85 songs, along with words for many more. Robert McCarl, folk arts director for the Idaho Commission on the Arts, wrote a foreword and Sorrels wrote an introduction, along with separate introductions for many of the songs.
- Sorrels, Rosalie; Rudokas, Jean; Schoeberlein, Liz (1974). What, woman, and who, myself, I am : an anthology of songs and poetry of women's experience. Sonoma, Calif.: Wooden Shoe. ISBN 0-8256-9905-3.
  - A collection of songs and poetry by and about women. Some of the songwriters represented include the author, Jean Ritchie, and Toni Brown, along with such poets as Anne Sexton and May Swenson. The music includes lead sheets and chord symbols. Liz Schoberlein contributes color illustrations throughout the book.
- Stringfellow, Nancy; Sorrels, Rosalie (1990). Report from Grimes Creek after a hard winter. Boise, Id.: Limberlost Press. ISBN 0-931659-07-8.
  - This book is five essays, three poems, and a letter written by Nancy Stringfellow to her daughter, Rosalie Sorrels. The memoir was compiled by Rosalie from her mother's writings.
