= English surnames of Norman origin =

Some family names contain clues as to their origin, like English surnames of Norman Origin. Which were first introduced after William, Duke of Normandy successfully invaded England in 1066.

According to Christopher Daniell, in From Norman Conquest to Magna Carta, 1140 marked what might be the first recorded use of a modern surname, inherited by multiple generations. The sons of a Norman named Robert used a modern inheritable surname, FitzGerald, in honour of an earlier relative, named Gerald.

According to Joslin Fiennes's Origins of English surnames modern surnames were not used until the fourteenth century:

"Surnames exploded into the records in the late fourteenth century, and document a unique history of ordinary medieval society during a short period of extraordinary social change. The roots of the names tell you the language people spoke then. It is a well-stirred mix of Old English, Middle English and Norman French, with some Norse and Celt, in which it is English that dominates. To see it in context, Norman French was the language of power and rank until Henry IV made English the tongue of kings at the end of the fourteenth century when most surnames already existed."

Beginning in the late 1500s and peaking in the wake of the Edict of Fontainebleau (1685), French Protestant refugees from France, the Huguenots, brought surnames like Dubarry (Aquitaine), Blanchard (whole France), Duhamel (Normandy, Picardy) and Dupuy (Aquitaine) into the English namespace, when the historical record shows these names had not been present prior to the fifteenth century.

== See also ==
- English surnames of Norse origin
