= Dipper well =

Perpetual-flow sink

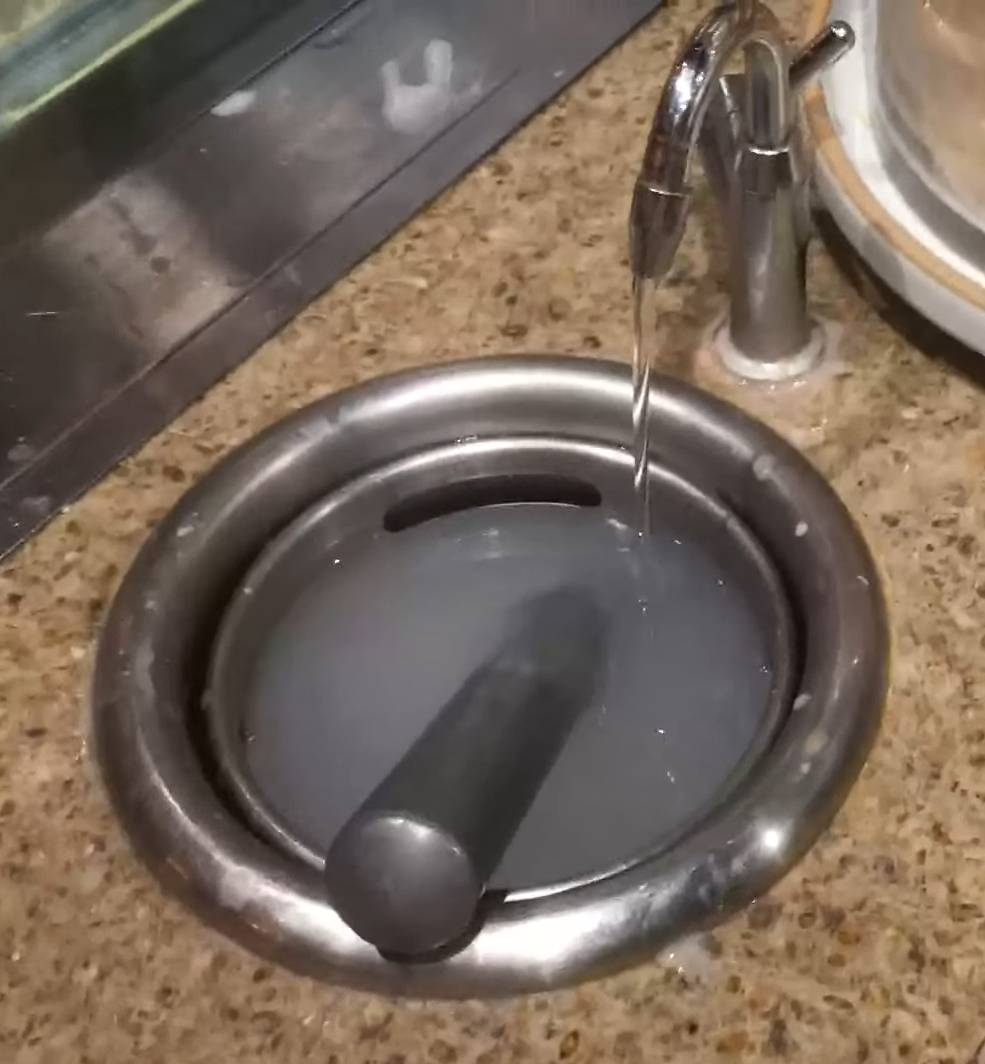
An ice cream scoop resting in a dipper well; its water will never stop flowing.

A dipper well is a perpetual-flow sink often used in coffeehouses and ice cream shops to rinse utensils. Ice cream scoops and other food-preparation utensils can be placed under the continuous stream in order to remove allergens, grime and protect against bacterial growth. Most dipper wells have a single spigot and can be adjusted for both hot and cold water use. As largely a commercial appliance, dipper well valves are typically kept at full flow during all serving hours. Dipper wells have also been used as key components in pharmacological experimentation.

== Criticism ==
The dipper well has been criticized in the United States and elsewhere as wasteful since on average it pumps 30 to 60 US gallons (110 to 230 L) of water an hour and is normally left running continuously. Because its potential for water waste is counteracted by a potential for increased sanitation, most health regulations do not prohibit or mandate dipper wells. It was estimated in 1988 that a dipper well running 12 hours a day in a single business could use up to 260,000 US gallons (980 m^{3}) of water yearly. It was found that some establishments, however, left dipper wells running even while the business was closed.

Starbucks Corporation, for example, was targeted in 2008 for wasting over 6 million US gallons (23,000 m^{3}) of water daily through use of dipper wells. The company's health and safety regulations prohibited the immediate shut-off of Starbucks dipper wells in order to prevent the breeding of pathogens, but meanwhile continued work towards environmentally friendly washing alternatives.
