= Drabble (disambiguation) =

A drabble is a work of fiction that is exactly 100 words long. The word may also refer to:

- Drabble (surname)
- Drabble (comic strip), a comic strip by Kevin Fagan
