= Westcott, Syracuse =

Neighborhood in Syracuse, New York, United States

Coordinates: 43.0410°N 76.1212°W

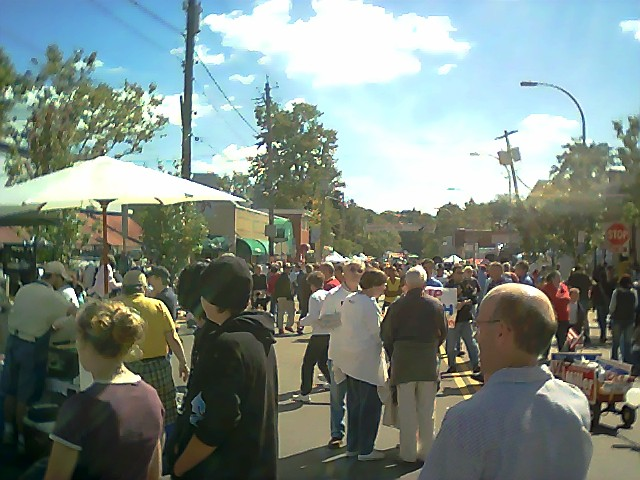
Westcott Street during the annual Westcott Street Cultural Fair in September 2004

Westcott is a neighborhood in Syracuse, New York, United States. Its proximity to Syracuse University makes for a diverse community, home to Syracuse University students, professors and other faculty and staff, as well as residents at all income levels. Westcott Street is the main retail street of the neighborhood, featuring numerous restaurants, coffee shops, stores and The Westcott Theater performing arts venue. It is the site of the annual Westcott Street Cultural Fair, a one-day event with food, art, live performances and cultural activities. Westcott is also home to Thornden Park, one of the largest parks in Syracuse. The Westcott neighborhood is the boyhood home of renowned banjoist Tony Trischka.

== History ==
Westcott was founded in the late nineteenth century as a result of the growth of Syracuse University. In 1893, the neighborhood began being served by electric streetcars, which ran on a loop along Walnut Avenue, Euclid Avenue, Westcott Street, and East Genesee Street towards downtown Syracuse. The current Westcott business district formed on the streetcar line.

The Blanchard House, Thornden Park, and Babcock-Shattuck House are listed on the National Register of Historic Places.

== Popular establishments ==
Westcott Street is home to numerous restaurants, coffee shops, and stores that reflect the neighborhood's diversity and bohemian culture. Alto Cinco, opened in 1995 as a takeout only restaurant, is a Tex-Mex eatery is located in the heart of Westcott street, right next to The Westcott Theater. Recess Coffee, opened in 2007, is located adjacent to Westcott Street. The brand has expanded to other regions of Syracuse, and they currently partner with over 60 different local cafes, restaurants and grocery stores to sell their self-titled brand of coffee. The Rise N Shine eatery opened in late summer of 2019.
