= Thornden Park =

- U.S. National Register of Historic Places
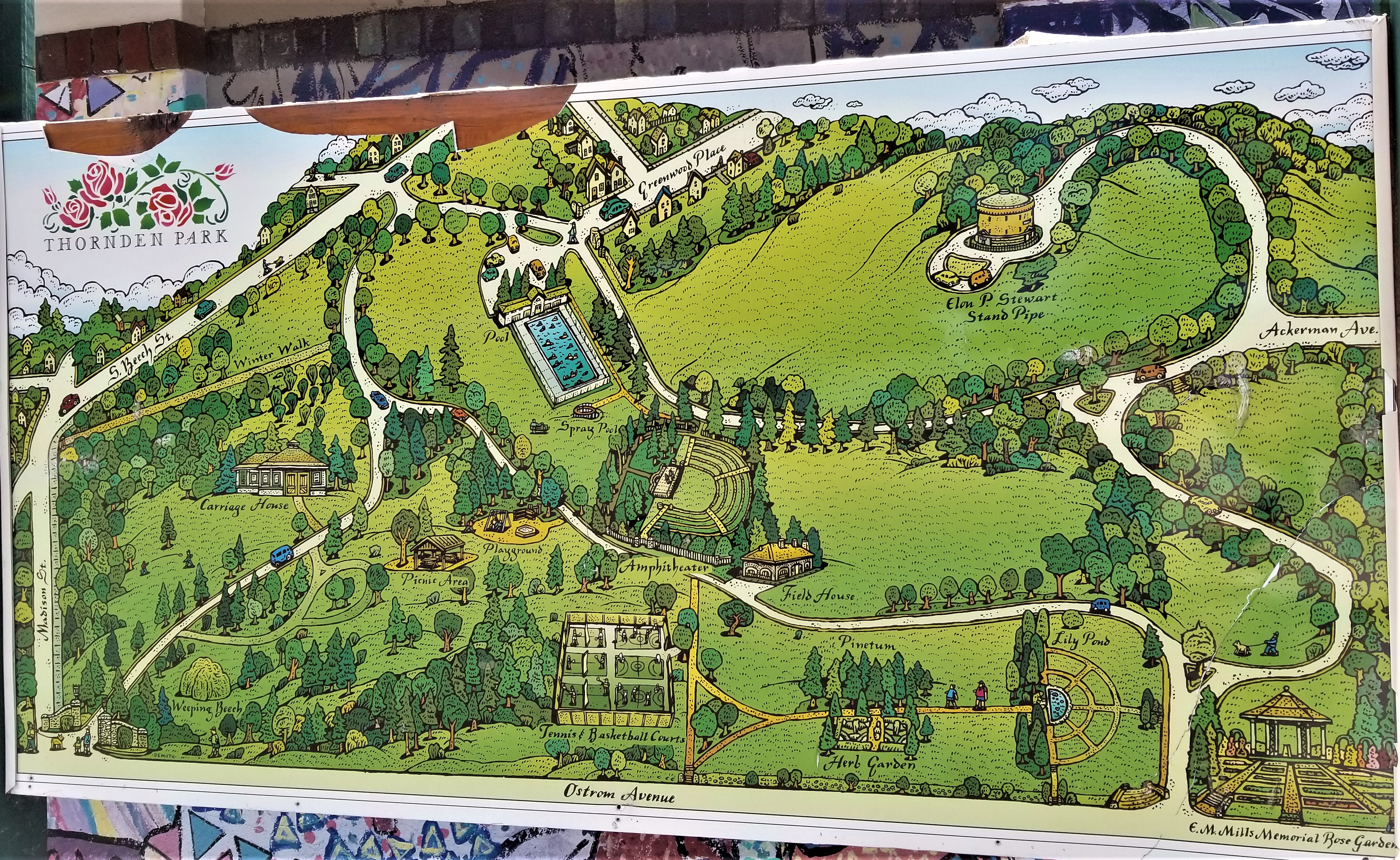
- Stylized map of Thornden Park

- Location within New York Location within the United States
- Location: Roughly bounded by Ostrom Ave. Madison St. Beech St. Bristol Pl. Greenwood Pl. Clarendon St. Syracuse, NY
- Coordinates: 43°2′29″N 76°7′35″W
- Area: 76 acres (31 ha)
- Built: 1875
- Architect: William Harradance; et al.
- MPS: Historic Designed Landscapes of Syracuse MPS
- NRHP reference No.: 94001490
- Added to NRHP: December 29, 1994

Thornden Park is a 76-acre (31 ha) park in Syracuse, New York, United States, which is the second largest in the city after Burnet Park. It was purchased by the city in 1921 and has become a favorite wedding location in the Syracuse park system. It is located in Westcott, and borders the University and University Hill neighborhoods. The park was listed on the National Register of Historic Places in 1994 as part of the Historic Designated Landscapes of Syracuse, New York.

== History ==
Thornden Park began as a farm owned by Zebulon Ostrom, who sold it to a wealthy salt miner James P. Haskins around 1850. In 1921 the city purchased the land as part of the nationwide City Beautiful movement and added recreational features such as the ballfields and swimming pool. During the 1960s, budget cuts threatened the cleanliness of the park; these were countered by neighborhood initiatives. The 1970s brought Dutch elm disease, which killed approximately 600 elm trees in the park. Maple trees were planted as replacements. The Thornden Park Association was founded in 1983 to advocate for, restore and revitalize the park.

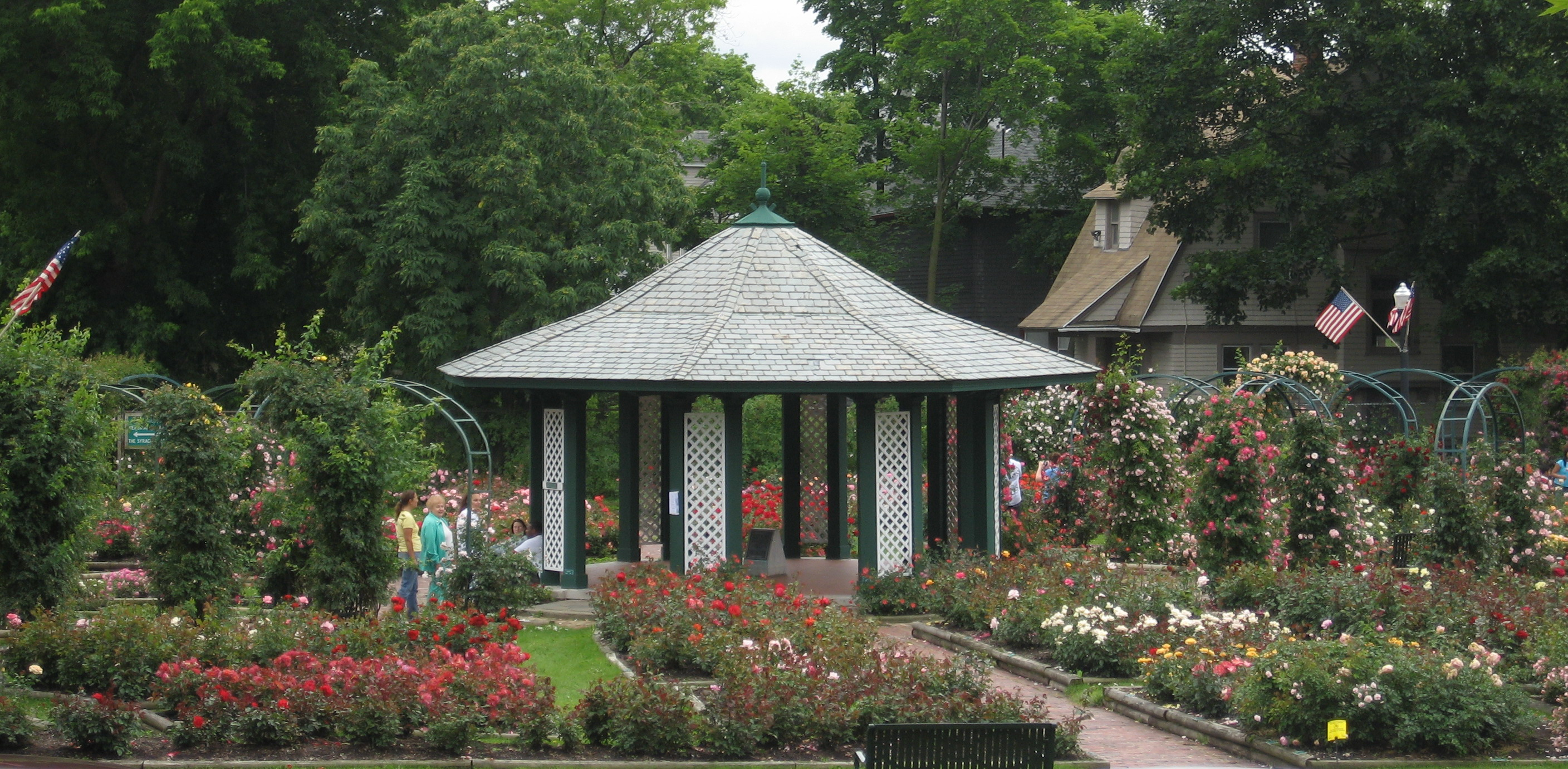
Rose Garden in June.

== Mills Rose Garden ==
One of the more popular attractions in the park is the E. M. Mills Memorial Rose Garden, dedicated in 1924 on 2 acres (8,100 m^{2}) at the southwest entrance to the park, across Ostrom Avenue from Syracuse University. Since 1970, the Syracuse Rose Society has maintained the garden in cooperation with the City of Syracuse Department of Parks, Recreation & Youth Programs. Currently, the garden hosts 368 different varieties of roses (3850 plants in all) that surround a central gazebo.

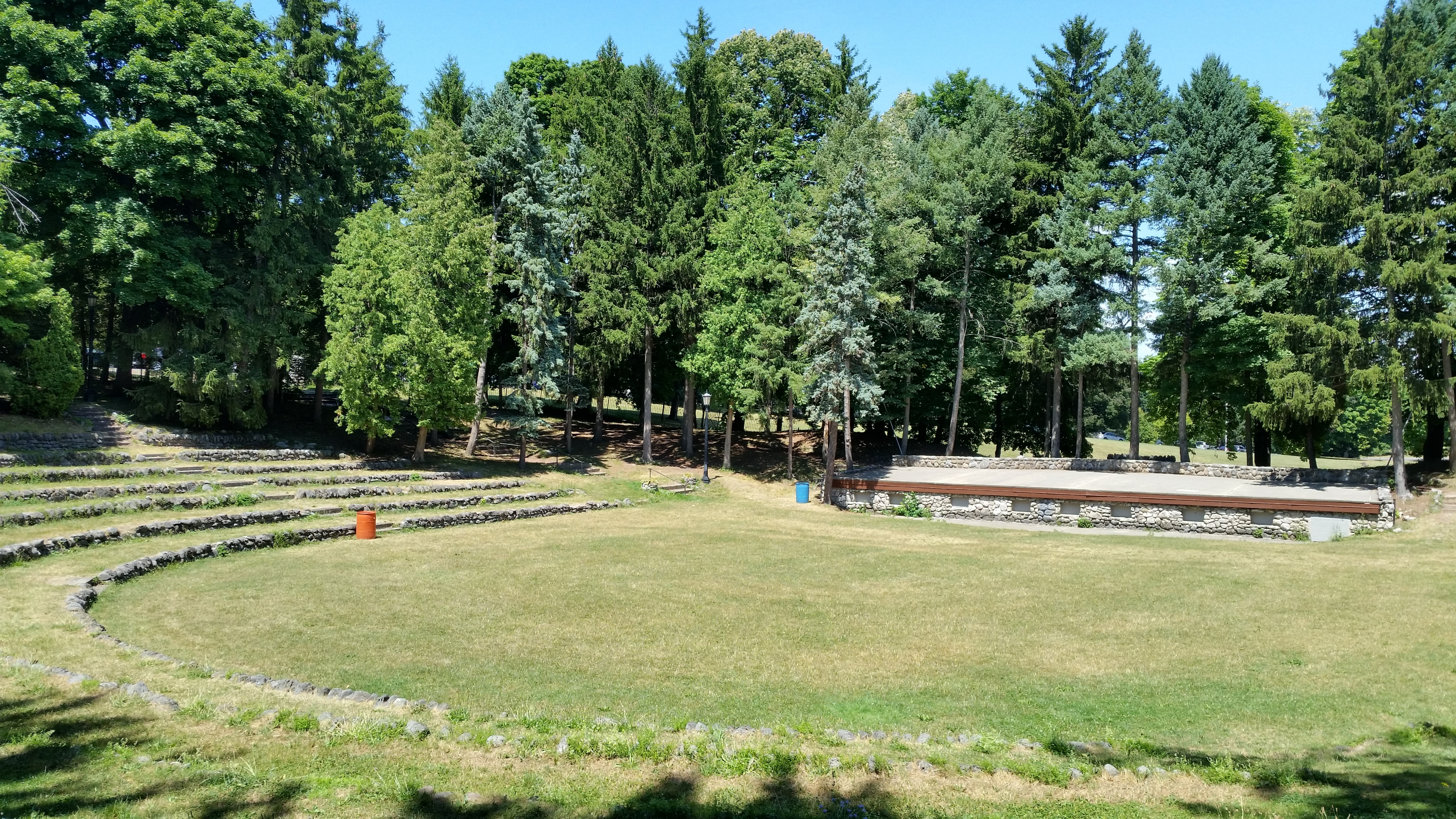
Thornden Park amphitheater

== Amphitheater ==
Originally named Sylvn Theatre, Thornden Park's amphitheater was built in 1933. The opening day ceremony was rained out but the subsequent opening was attended by 10,000 people. It is built to seat 6,000 people in its concentric rings and open lawn in the middle of the amphitheater. The Syracuse Opera puts on a free show the first Sunday in August each year. Since 2003, the Syracuse Shakespeare Festival has presented its free, Shakespeare-in-the-Park program, currently the first two weekends of June.

== Features ==
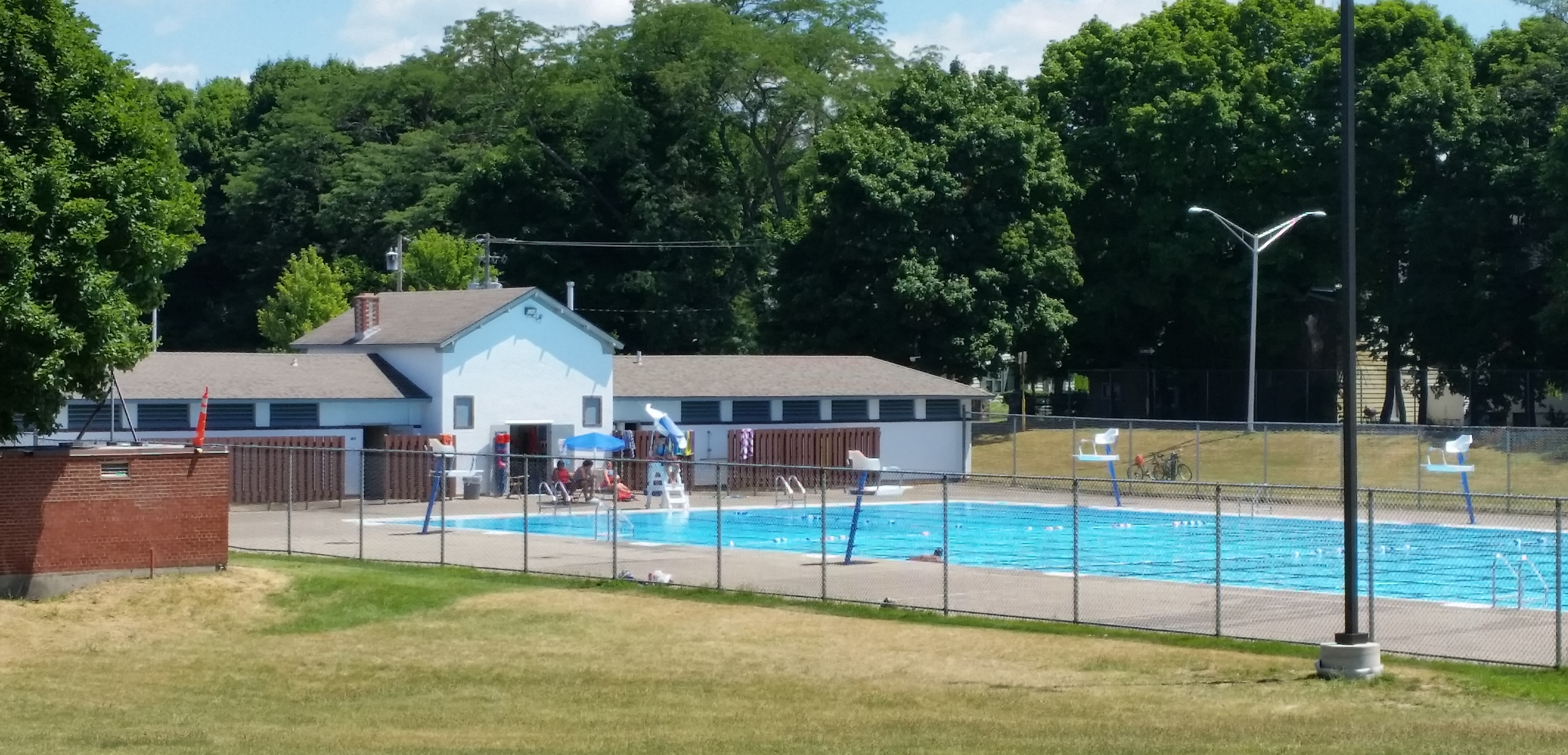
Public swimming pool

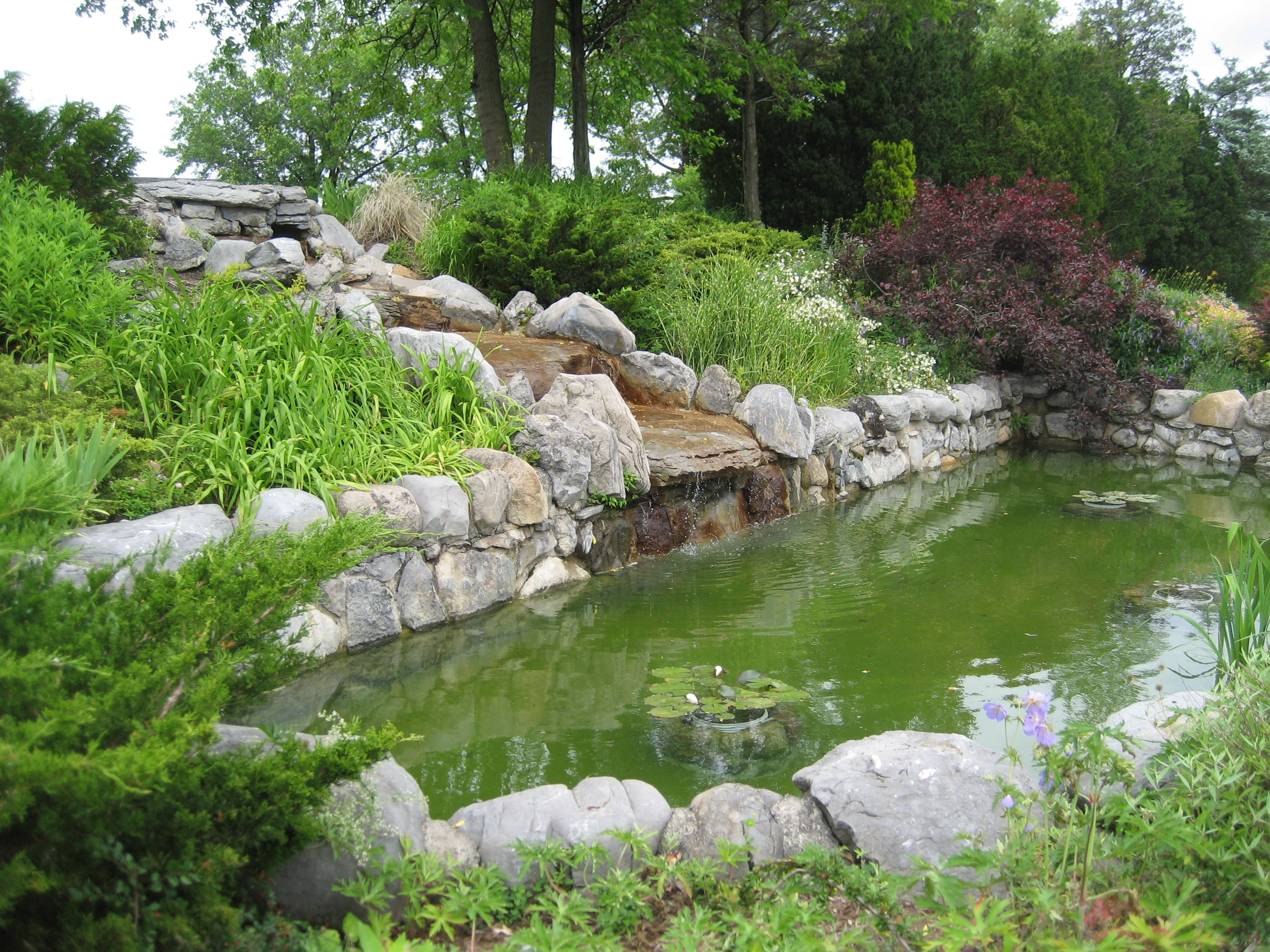
Lily Pond in June

- Public swimming pool (50 m)
- One multi-purpose sports field
- Five tennis courts
- Three basketball courts
- Playground
- Fitness trail
- E.M. Mills Memorial Rose Garden
- Outdoor amphitheater
- Lily pond

== Murals ==
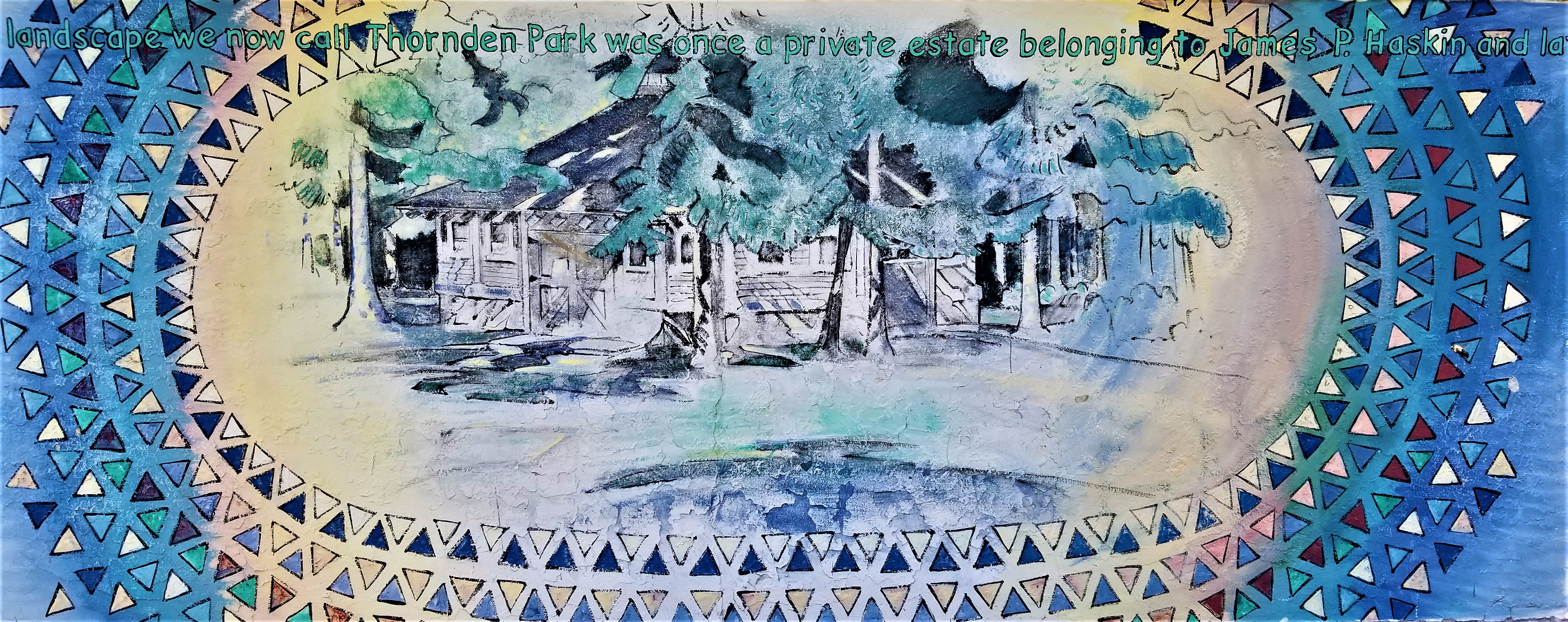
Carriage House

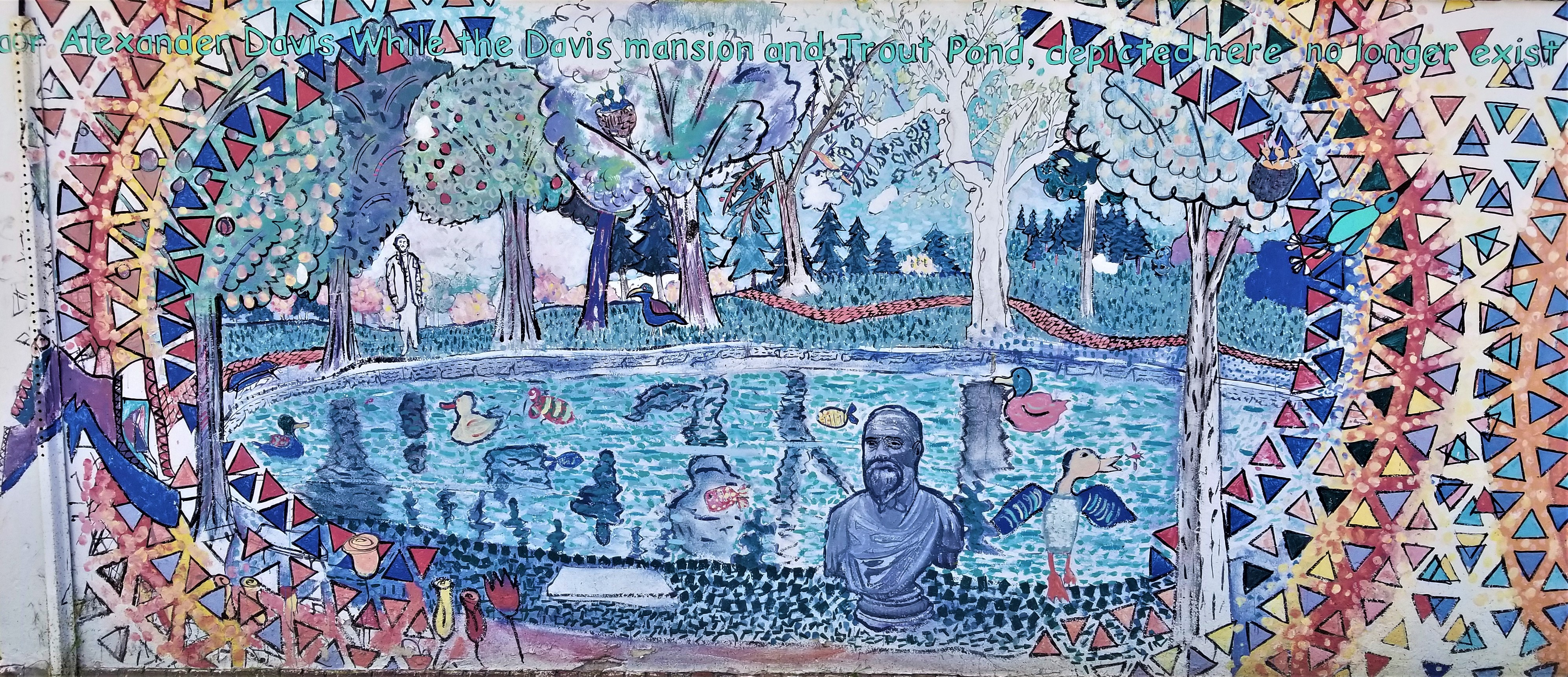
Trout Pond

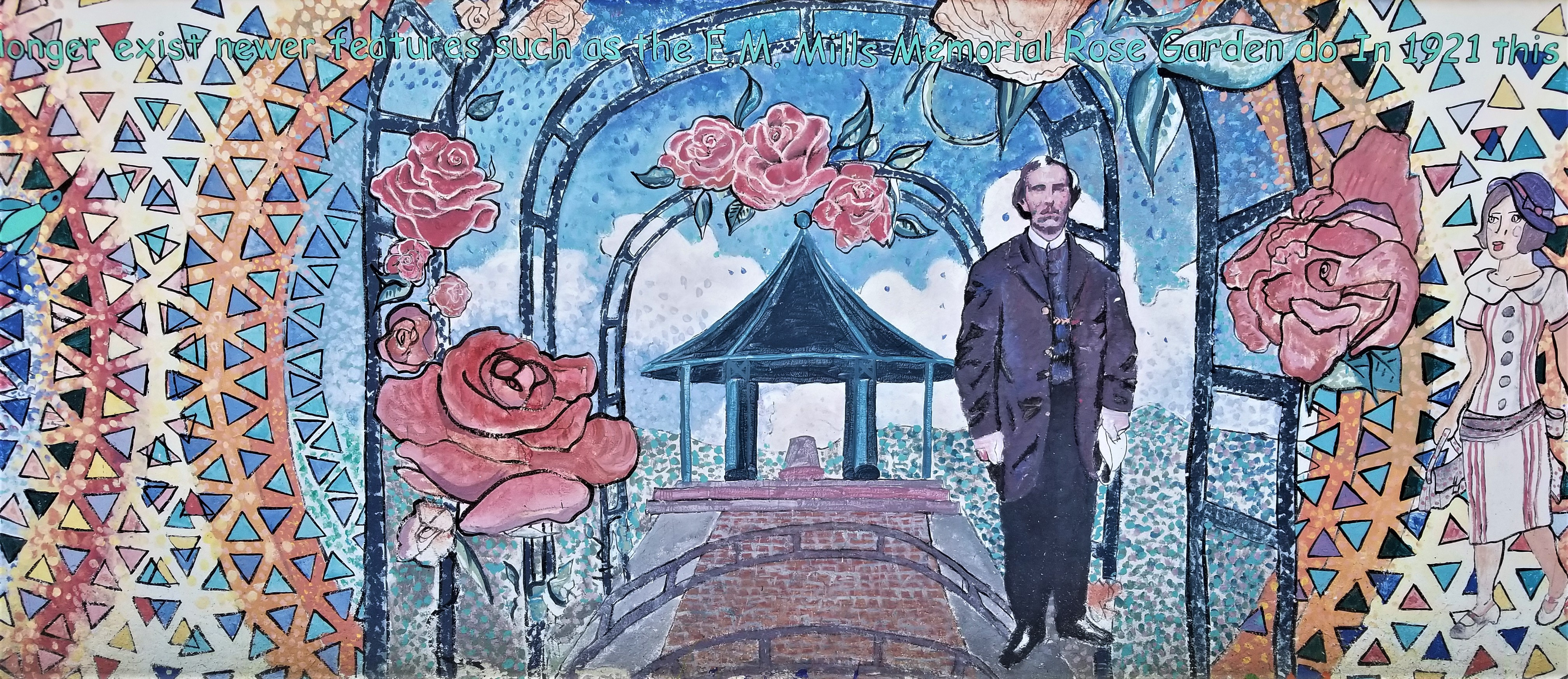
Mills Rose Garden

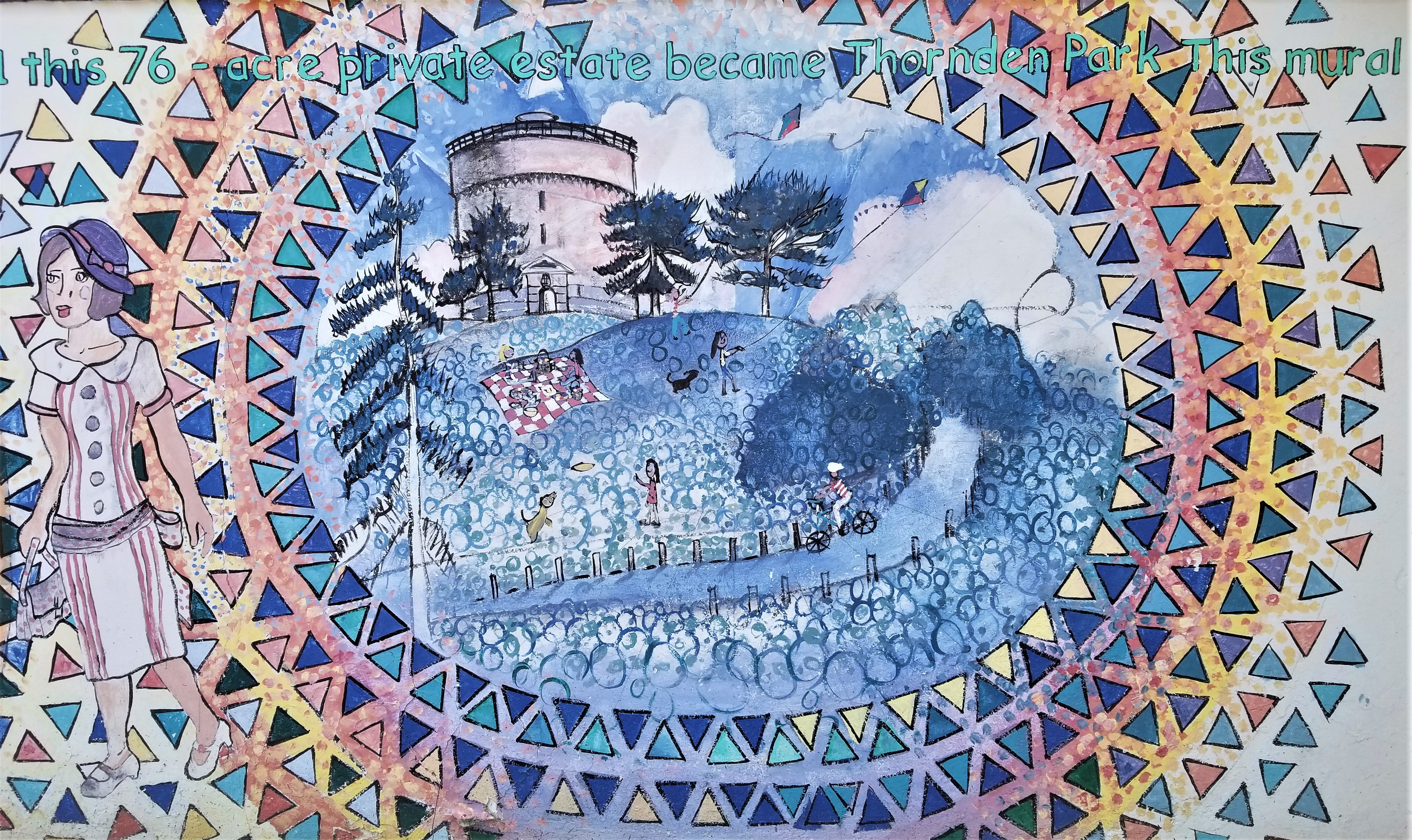
Stewart Stand Pipe

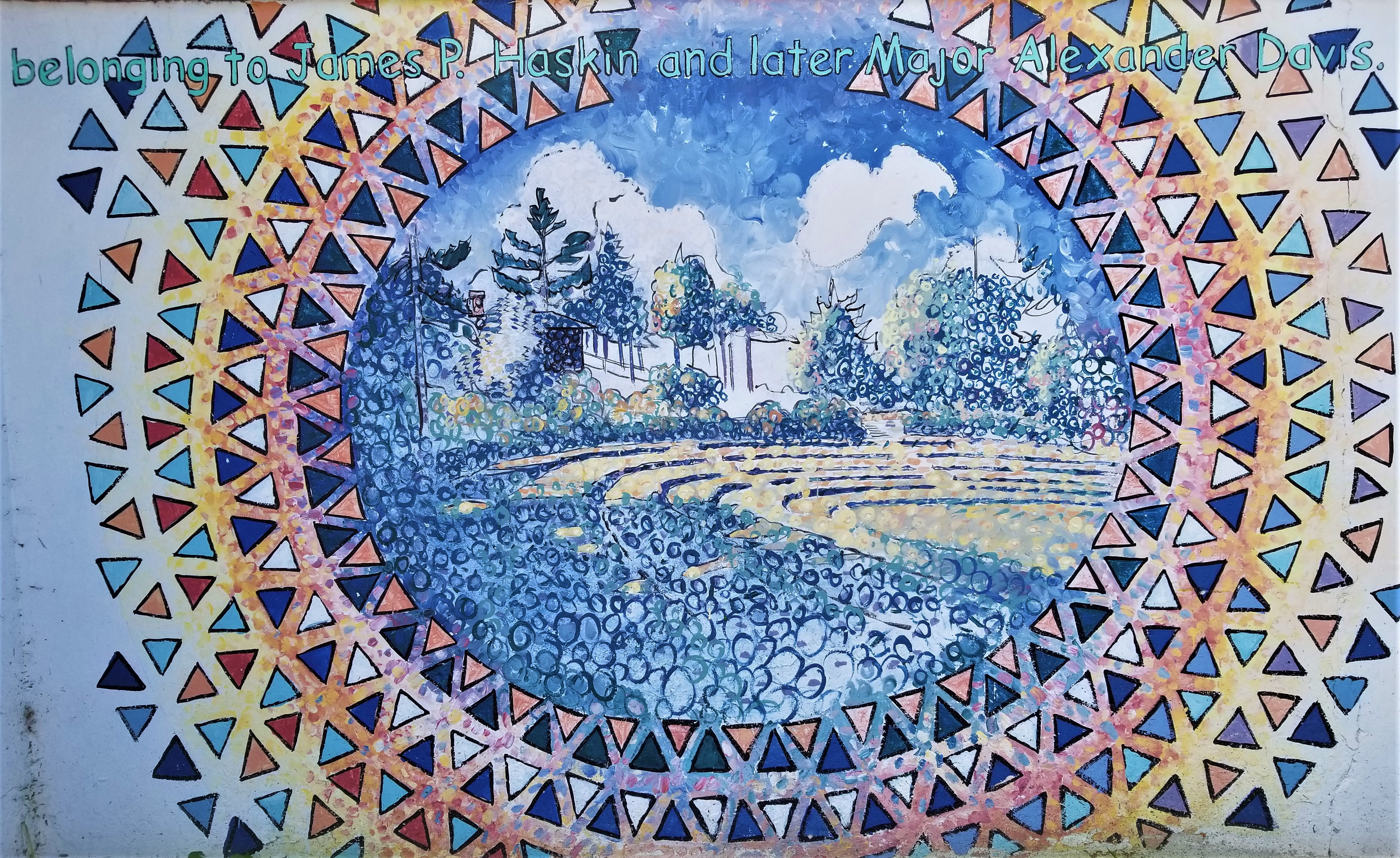
Amphitheater

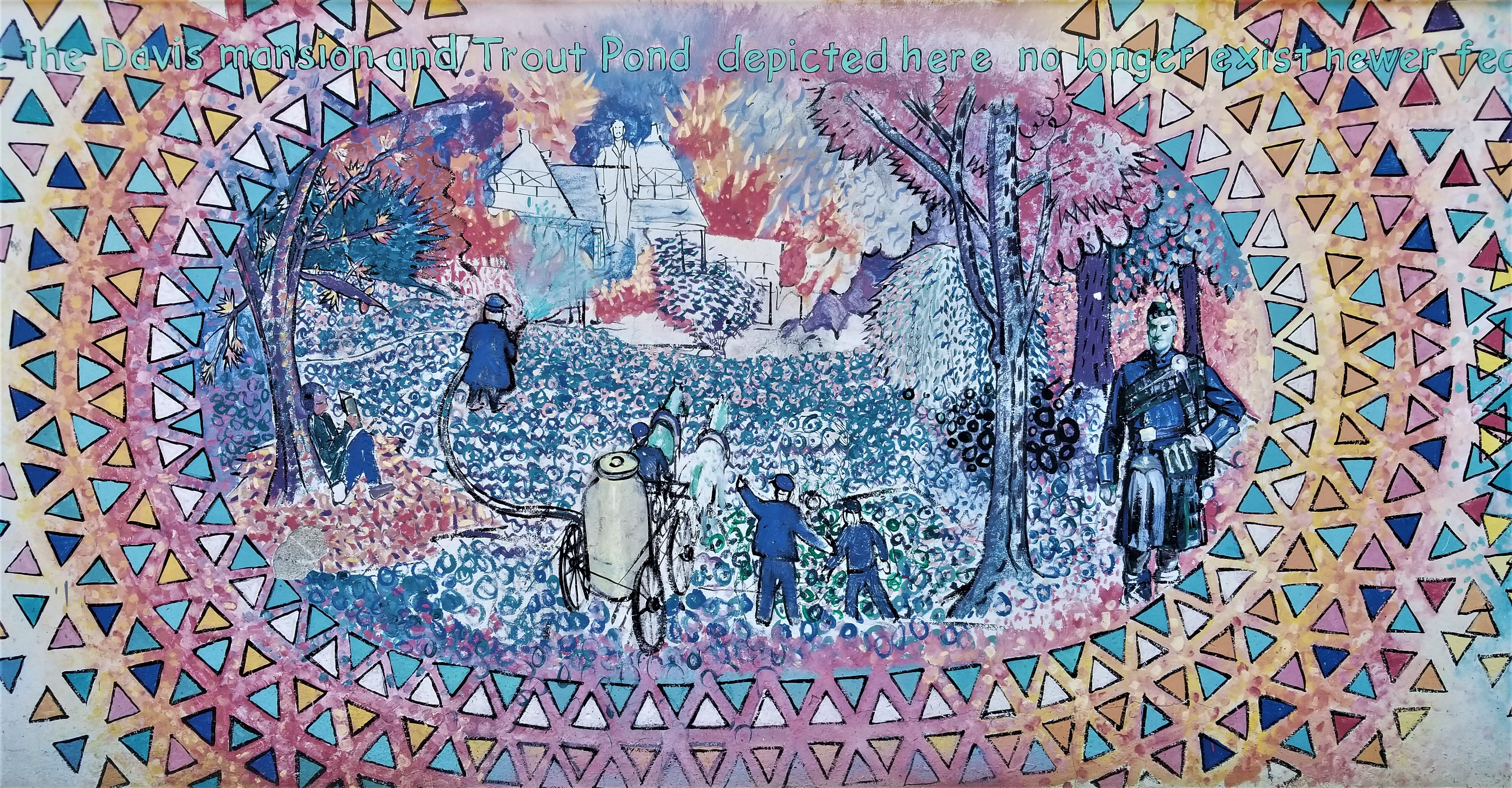
Davis Mansion

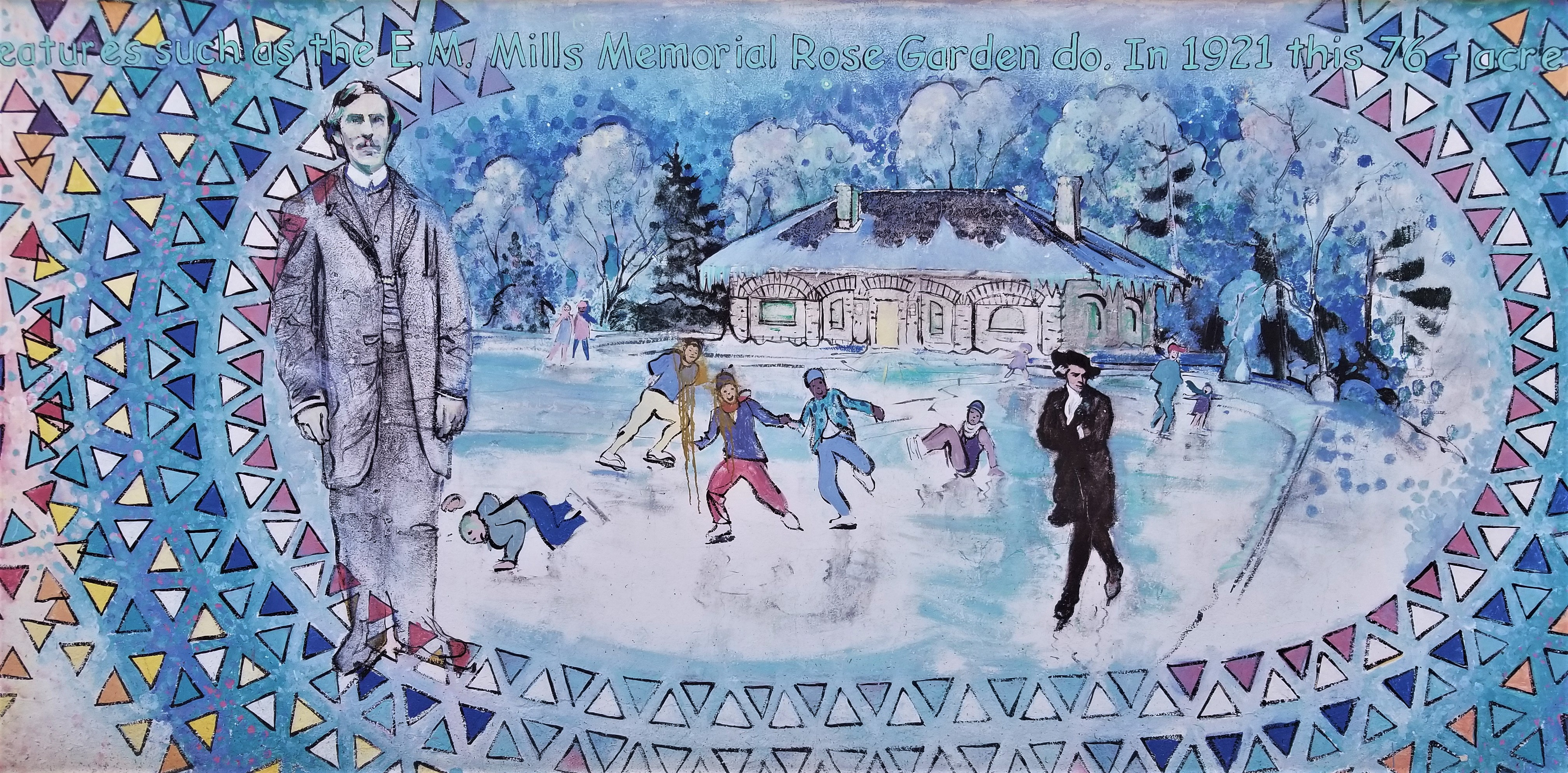
Ice Skating

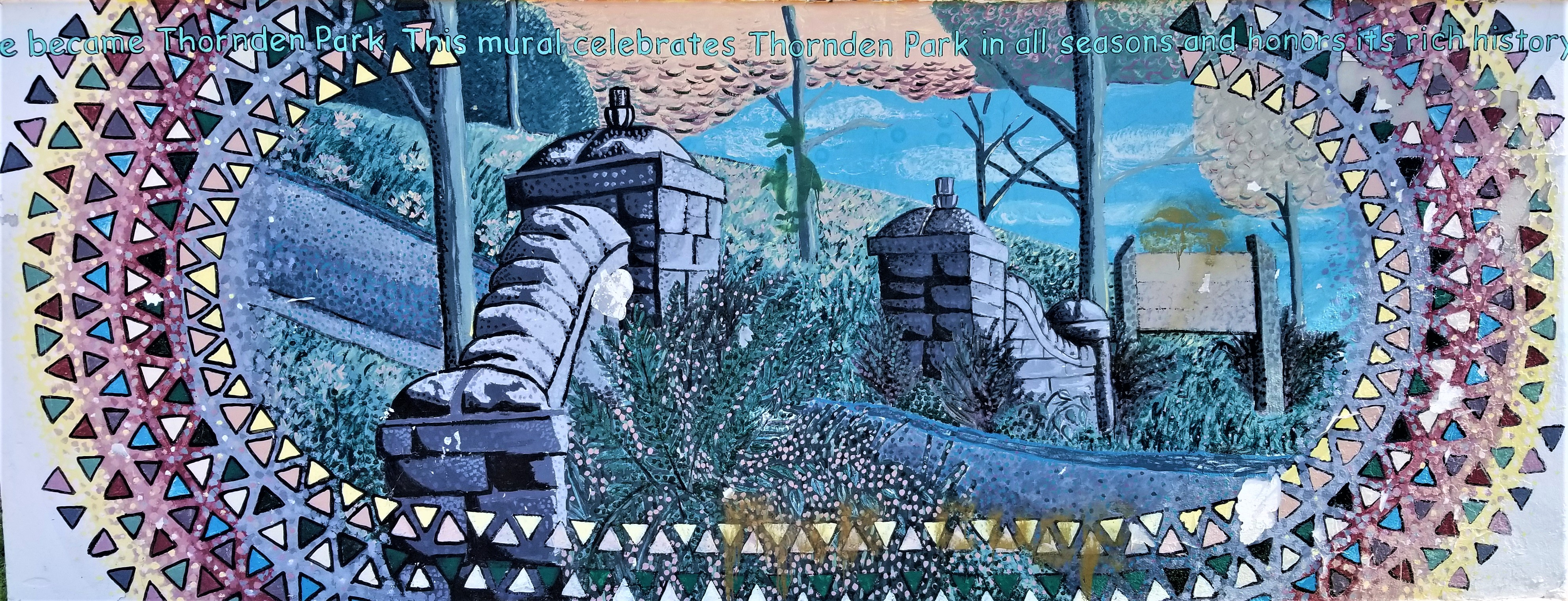
Main Entrance

(Depictions of the history and selected features of Thornden Park, on the exterior of the pool building.)
