= Quennell =

Quennell is a surname. Notable people with the surname include:

- C. H. B. Quennell (1872–1935), architect, designer, illustrator and writer
- Frank Quennell (born 1956), politician
- Joan Quennell (1923–2006), politician
- Marjorie Quennell (1884–1972), author/illustrator
- Peter Quennell (1905–1993), biographer

== See also ==
- Nanaimo/Quennell Lake Water Aerodrome
- Quenelle
- Quinnell
