= Thurgood =

Thurgood is a surname and a given name, and may refer to the following people:

== Surname ==
- Albert Thurgood (1874–1927), Australian rules footballer
- Graham Thurgood, linguist
- Josh Thurgood (1985–), Australian rules footballer
- Rose Thurgood (b. 1602), English Puritan writer
- Stuart Thurgood (1981–), an English football (soccer) player

== Given names ==
- Thurgood Marshall (1908–1993), first African American to serve on the Supreme Court of the United States
- Thurgood Marshall Jr. (born 1956), White House Cabinet Secretary during the Clinton Administration

== See also ==
- Thurgood (play), a play by George Stevens Jr about the Supreme Court justice
- Thurgood Marshall (disambiguation)
