= Tookie =

Tookie may refer to:

- Stanley Tookie Williams, American gangster and original founder of a street gang known as the Crips
- Tookie Gilbert, American baseball player
- Steve Peregrin Took, English musician/songwriter and prominent member of the UK underground, frequently known socially as Tookie
- Bartholomew Tookie, MP and mayor
- Tookie De La Crème, a fictional character in the book Modelland by Tyra Banks

== See also ==
- Tookey, a surname
