= The Westcott Theater =

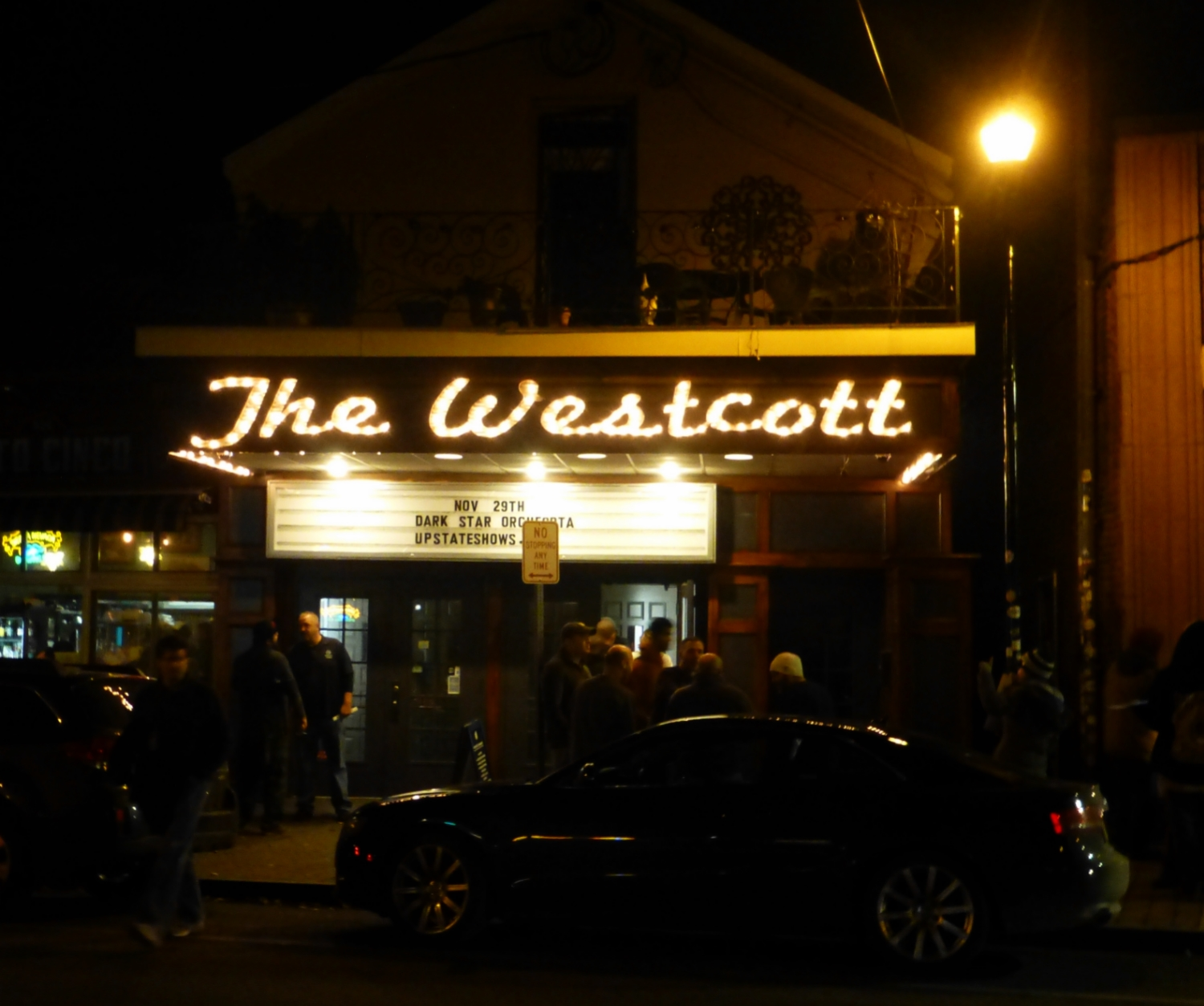
- Interactive map of The Westcott Theater
- Address: 524 Westcott St., Syracuse, NY 13210
- Location: Westcott, Syracuse
- Coordinates: 43.041229°N 76.119501°W
- Type: Music Venue

Construction
- Built: 1919
- Opened: 2008

Website
- thewestcotttheater.com

The Westcott Theater was a 700-person multi-purpose, cinema-style concert venue at 524 Westcott St in the Westcott neighborhood of Syracuse, New York, United States. Although it booked acts of many different genres, the venue had been steadily increasing its amount of electronic music acts since 2011. Formerly known as the Westcott Cinema, it was re-purposed and re-opened in Oct. 18, 2007 to serve as a local concert venue for the Westcott Nation as well as attract much of the Syracuse University and the State University of New York College of Environmental Science and Forestry concert going college crowd.

== History ==
The building that is now known as the Westcott Theater was first constructed in 1919. Formerly called the Kallett, Harvard Theater and then the Studio, the theater originally acted as a cinema hosting a variety of films ranging from vaudeville films to more risque adult films. By the 1980s, Westcott Cinema was a discount theater with an admission price of $1.50. SJM Entertainment Corp operated the theater from 1988 through 1993 but declined to renew the lease, citing "difficulty obtaining second-run product." Westcott, Inc. took over the lease from 1993 through 1997, continuing to show second-run movies. In 1997, Nat Tobin, who had previously purchased Manlius Art Cinema, took over the lease and transitioned it into a first-run theater that showed independent films until October 2007. Interested in appropriating the now defunct cinema, local entrepreneurs Sam Levey and Dan Mastronardi approached building owner Ray Duplain with an offer. After renovating the former cinema, tearing out the seats and screen and installing a small bar, the Westcott Theater opened for business. The venue began hosting shows in September 2008, although its official opening was not held until November of the same year. The Post Standard's Chris Baker said in 2013 that “the [Westcott] theater has become the most consistent midsize venue in [Syracuse] with about 120 shows annually.”

On September 28, 2026, the Syracuse Common Council unanimously voted to revoke the Westcott Theater‘s special use permit, citing violent incidents, including gunfire, in and around the venue and insufficient security staffing. The permit revocation prevents the Westcott Theater from continuing to operate as an indoor entertainment venue, preventing future concerts and events at the longtime Syracuse music destination.

== Concerts ==
In Syracuse the Westcott Theater performed two concerts by moe. Dated 31 July 2020 and 1 August 2020, as Vernon Downs unexpectedly cancelled the drive-in activities of the jam rock team.
