= Dowsing (disambiguation) =

Dowsing is a method of divination that attempts to locate ground water or other buried materials.

Dowsing may also refer to:

- William Dowsing (1596–1668), English Puritan and iconoclast
- Dowsing (band), an American emo band
- Dowsing (horse) (1984–1993), American Thoroughbred racehorse
- Inner and Outer Dowsing sand banks, in the southern North Sea

Dowse may refer to:

- Dowse (surname)
- Dowse Art Museum, in Lower Hutt, New Zealand

== See also ==
- Dousing, the practice of making something or someone wet by throwing liquid over them
