= Seagrim =

Seagrim is a surname which may refer to:

- Anne Seagrim (1914–2011), British secretary to C.P. Snow and to the Duke of Windsor, and administrator of the Churchill Memorial Trust
- Derek Seagrim (1903–1943), British soldier, recipient of the Victoria Cross
- Hugh Seagrim (1909–1944), British soldier, recipient of the George Cross
- Molly "Moll" Seagrim, fictional character in English novel The History of Tom Jones (1749)

== See also ==
- Seagrim, a house of Norwich School, named after Derek and Hugh Seagrim
