= Grime (album) =

Studio album by Iniquity
- Released: November 30, 2001
- Genre: Death metal
- Length: 45:55
- Label: Mighty Music
- Producer: Jacob Hansen

Iniquity chronology
Five Across the Eyes (1999)	Grime (2001)	Iniquity Bloody Iniquity (2003)

Grime is the third studio album by Danish death metal band Iniquity, released in 2001.

Chronicles of Chaos noted, "Grime is merely catchy upon a first spin, but soon becomes annoyingly addictive."

== Track listing ==
Grime track listing
No.	Title	Length
1.	"Tides of Vengeance"	4:31
2.	"The Bullet's Breath"	3:53
3.	"Border Into Shadow"	5:40
4.	"Bloodletting"	5:29
5.	"Spawn of the Abscess"	7:23
6.	"Thawed for Breeding"	6:16
7.	"Stygian" (instrumental)	0:38
8.	"The Last Incantation"	5:14
9.	"Poets of the Trench"	2:54
10.	"Poets of the Trench, Part II"	3:57
Total length:		51:55

== Credits ==
- Jesper Frost Jensen - drums
- Mads Haarløv - vocals, Guitar
- Thomas Fagerlind - Bass
- Kræn Meier - Guitar
- Jacob Hansen - Producer, Engineer, Mixing
- Bjarke Ahlstrand - Executive Producer, Editing, Mastering, Photography, Typography, Visuals
- Michael H. Andersen - Executive Producer
- Ossian Ryner - Editing
- Daniel Long - Artwork, Collage
