= Grimes House =

Grimes House may refer to:

in the United States (by state then city)

- Grimes House (Manhattan, Kansas), listed on the National Register of Historic Places (NRHP) in Riley County
- Grimes House (Smith Center, Kansas), NRHP-listed in Smith County
- Willis Grimes House, Danville, Kentucky, NRHP-listed in Boyle County
- Felix Grimes House, Owensboro, Kentucky, NRHP-listed in Daviess County
- Grimes House and Mill Complex, Lexington, Kentucky, NRHP-listed in Fayette County
- Jonathan Taylor Grimes House, Edina, Minnesota, NRHP-listed
- Grimes Homestead (Mountain Lakes, New Jersey), NRHP-listed
- Dr. C. A. Grimes House, Bastrop, Texas, NRHP-listed in Bastrop County
- Grimes House (Hillsboro, Texas), NRHP-listed in Hill County
