= Iniquity (band) =

Danish death metal band

Background information
- Origin: Copenhagen, Denmark
- Genres: Brutal death metal Technical death metal
- Years active: 1989–2004, 2013, 2015–present
- Labels: Emanzipation Productions; Mighty Music Records
- Past members: Peter Houd; Rene Falther; Morten Hansen; Brian Petrowsky; Claus Zeeberg; Jacob Olsen; Mads Haarløv; René Madsen; Thomas Christensen; Jesper Frost Jensen; Martin Rosendahl; Brian Eriksen; Lars Friis; Jens Lee; Thomas Fagerlind; Kræn Meier; Carsten Viggo Nielsen
- Website: www.iniquity.dk

Iniquity was a Danish death metal group. Established in 1989, the band released three full-length albums before parting ways in 2004.

Decibel said the band's debut album Serenadium "shocked the death metal world with its blend of American brutality and European tact."

== History ==
Iniquity was formed in 1989 in Copenhagen, Denmark by Peter Houd, Brian Petrowsky and Morten Hansen. During the first years of the band's history two demo tapes were released and they appeared on several Compilation CDs e.g. on the Fuck You We're from Denmark compilation in 1992 with the song "Torn" (taken from the Entering Deception demo). After that release the band split up for a time but started it up again with Morten Hansen and Brian Petrowsky together with Jacob Olsen (drums and backing vocals). After Jacob Olsens entry, it was decided to pull Iniquity onto a new path away from the more traditional style of death-thrash with lyrics centered mostly around real life issues of psychology to a more doom metal inspired and leaned-back style of gloomy death-thrash also influenced by the early mid-paced US death metal scene and the lyrics were now set in the gothic sci-fi realm of H.P Lovecraft. To complete the transformation of the now totally reinvented "new Iniquity" Carsten Nielsen (keyboards) was added to the line-up. Morten Hansen left once again and was replaced by Claus Zeeberg (bass) and this line-up recorded a now classic promo tape called Promo '93, followed by a track on the compilation The Very Best Of Progress Red Labels. They toured for some time and recruited Mads Haarløv as lead guitarist. Bassist Claus Zeeberg then decided to leave, and was replaced by Thomas Christensen. After more touring keyboard player Carsten Nielsen left Iniquity. After an appearance on the live compilation Brutal Youth with two new songs "Prophecy of the Dying Watcher" and "Mockery Retained to Obturate", Haarløv left the band and Lars Friis entered the fold.

In 1995 the band signed a deal with Emanzipation Productions and entered the well known Borsing Studio together with Jan Borsing to record their first full-length album Serenadium. Due to several reasons the recording got quite delayed but during this time the band got itself a larger record company in the form of Emanzipation Productions becoming a sub-division of Diehard Music Worldwide. Serenadium finally saw the light of day in the summer of 1996.

A complete line-up change occurred in 1997 but the new members did not waste time and wrote 4 new songs which were recorded in November 1997 by Lars Schmidt (Furious Trauma and Konkhra) at the Soundzone Studio and mixed by Jacob Hansen. At this time EMZ had decided to start up its own independent record company, which turned out to be Mighty Music. The first release was the EP The Hidden Lore by Iniquity in May 1998. It resulted in many positive reviews, e.g. 7/7 in Hammer (Germany) and 8,5/10 in Rock Hard (Germany).

After even more line-up changes (new vocalist, new bass player and new guitarist), the band entered the Aabenraa Studio in May 1999 to record their second full-length album Five Across The Eyes with Jacob Hansen. It was released worldwide through Mighty Music on 8 November 1999. Iniquity again faced a line-up change when guitarist Brian Eriksen left the band and was replaced by Kræn Meier (also member of Sacrificial). Their last album entitled Grime (once again produced by Jacob Hansen) was released in 2001 and after that only a best-of compilation album was released in 2003 before they disbanded.

After the band broke up in 2004, Mads Haarløv, Kræn Meier and Martin Rosendahl formed a death metal band called Strangler which has released one demo "Infinite Blood Abundance" but its status is currently unknown. Jesper Jensen, Rene Falther and Thomas Fagerlind have formed the band Downlord, but Jensen has since left. Brian Eriksen, Jens Lee and Martin Rosendahl are in the band Corpus Mortale.

Fagerlind and Christensen also played in the band Daemon which featured Gene Hoglan.

The band had an anniversary reunion in 2012 with The Hidden Lore line-up. This resulted in several live shows in 2013. Because of a couple cancelled shows during the anniversary tour, Iniquity re-formed again in 2014 to perform those shows.

== Personnel ==
=== Current members ===
- Thomas Christensen - bass guitar (1994–1996, 2014–present)
- Martin Rosendahl - bass guitar, vocals (1996–1999, 2012-2013), guitar, vocals (2014–present)
- Jesper Frost Jensen - drums (1996–2004, 2012-2013, 2014-present)
- Brian Eriksen - guitar (1996–2000, 2012-2013, 2014-present)

=== Former members ===
- Mads Haarløv - guitar (1993–1995, 1998–2004), vocals (1998-2004)
- René Madsen - guitar (1993)
- Lars Friis - guitar (1996–1997)
- Jens Lee - guitar (1997–1999, 2012-2013)
- Brian Petrowsky - vocals, guitar (1989–1996)
- Kræn Meier - guitar (2001–2003)
- Thomas Fagerlind - bass guitar (1998–2003)
- Peter Houd - bass guitar (1989–1992)
- Claus Zeeberg - bass guitar (1992–1994)
- Jacob Olsen - drums (1992–1996)
- Morten Hansen - drums (1989–1992)
- Carsten Viggo Nielsen - keyboards (1992-1994)

=== Live members ===
- Rene Falther - guitar (2000)

== Discography ==
=== Demos ===
- Words of Despair (1991)
- Entering Deception (1992)
- Promo '93 (1993)

=== Studio albums ===
- Serenadium (1996)
- Five Across the Eyes (1999)
- Grime (2001)

=== Compilations ===
- Iniquity Bloody Iniquity (2003)

=== EPs ===
- The Hidden Lore (1998)

=== Singles ===
- Revel in Cremation (2003)

=== Re-releases ===
- Entering Deception and Promo 93 (2013)
