= Grime =

Grime may refer to:

- Dirt, in the form of black, ingrained dust

== Music ==
- Grime music, a genre of music
- Grime (album), a 2001 album by Iniquity
- "Grime", a 2023 song by Macklemore from Ben
- "Grime", a 2024 song by Kittie from Fire

== Other uses ==
- Grime (video game), a 2021 Metroidvania video game
- GrimE, a LucasArts game engine
- Grime River, in Papua province, Indonesia
- Helen Grime (born 1981), Scottish composer
- J. Philip Grime (1935–2021), British ecologist

== See also ==
- Grimes (disambiguation)
