= Eanes =

Eanes is an English surname, a variant of Scottish surname "Innes" or "McInness" or a variation of modern Norwegian surname "Enersen". As a separate origin, it can also be a variant of the Portuguese "Eannes".

Notable people with this surname include:

- Jim Eanes (1923–1995), American musician
