= USS Grimes =

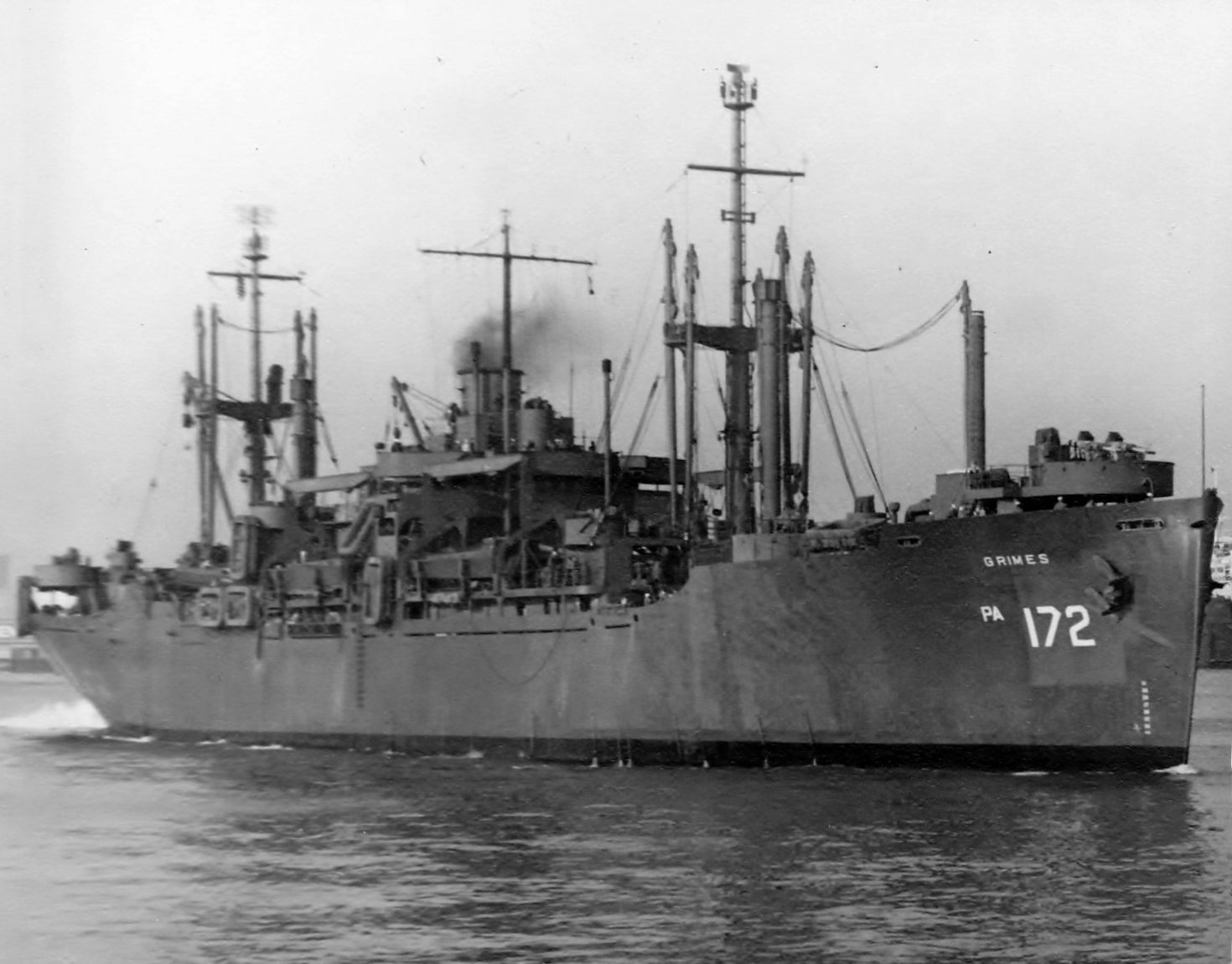

History

United States
- Name: USS Grimes
- Namesake: Grimes County, Texas
- Ordered: as type VC2-S-AP5
- Launched: 27 October 1944
- Acquired: 23 November 1944
- Commissioned: 23 November 1944
- Decommissioned: 26 February 1947
- Stricken: 1 October 1958
- Fate: Sold for scrapping, 21 August 1974

General characteristics
- Displacement: 12,450 tons (full load)
- Length: 455 ft 0 in (138.68 m)
- Beam: 62 ft 0 in (18.90 m)
- Draught: 24 ft 0 in (7.32 m)
- Speed: 19 knots
- Capacity: 150,000 cu. ft, 2,900 tons
- Complement: 56 Officers 480 Enlisted
- Armament: one 5 in (130 mm) gun mount, four 40 mm gun mounts, ten 20 mm gun mounts

USS Grimes (APA-172) was a Haskell-class attack transport in service with the United States Navy from 1944 to 1947. She was scrapped in 1974.

== History ==
Grimes (APA-172) was acquired by the Navy from the United States Maritime Commission on loan charter basis 23 November 1944; sponsored by Mrs. Harry Fielding; and commissioned 23 November 1944.

=== World War II ===
After shakedown out of San Pedro, Los Angeles, Grimes returned to Seattle, Washington, 25 January 1945; embarked over 240 troops; then departed Seattle 1 February for Honolulu in support of the Navy's great Pacific Ocean offensive. After conducting exercises off Maui Island, Grimes was underway 20 February 1945, with Transport Division 59 and anchored off the northeast coast of recently secured Iwo Jima 14 March and began embarking units of the 4th Marine Division for evacuation to the Philippine area. While riding to anchor Grimes was brought under fire at a distance of about 1,000 yards from small arms positioned in caves and crevices near the waters edge. No damage or casualties resulted. Grimes cleared the area 20 March and discharged 1,618 passengers at Pearl Harbor 4 April 1945.

After shuttling troops among the Hawaiian Islands, Grimes departed Honolulu with officers and enlisted patients of the Navy, Marine Corps, and Merchant Marine. Reaching San Francisco 30 May 1945, she disembarked her passengers, then sailed for Seattle. With 1,512 Army and Navy passengers on board, the transport sailed from Seattle 16 June and discharged troops at Honolulu and Okinawa before putting in at Guam 14 August. Here she took aboard 900 officers and men of the 6th Marine Division and 8 war correspondents. Sailing the next day Grimes rendezvoused with units of the U.S. 3rd Fleet 19 August far the initial occupation of Japan; she anchored in Tokyo Bay 30 August 1945 and landed her troops and cargo for the occupation of Yokosuka Naval Base without incident.

Grimes sortied from Tokyo Bay 1 September 1945 as part of Task Unit 30.3.5 en route Saipan to lift units of the 2nd Marines for the occupation of Nagasaki. Sailing from Saipan 18 September she put her troops ashore 23–25 September 1945. Grimes carried out her transport duties in the Pacific until 15 June 1946 when she sailed from Sasebo, Japan. Going by way of the Panama Canal Zone she reached Norfolk, Virginia, 13 July 1946.

William Taylor served aboard the USS Grimes as an amphibious boat crew member during WWII. He took part in the landings at the Battle of Iwo Jima.

=== Decommissioning and Fate ===
Grimes remained at Norfolk and decommissioned there 26 February 1947. She remained in the Atlantic Reserve Fleet until 1 October 1958, when her name was struck from the Navy List and she was transferred to the Maritime Commission. She was placed in the National Defense Reserve Fleet at Wilmington, North Carolina, and in October 1964 she was transferred to James River, Virginia. She was sold for scrapping on 21 August 1974 to Union Minerals and Alloys Corporation, New York, $280,160.

== Awards ==
Grimes received one battle star for World War II service.
