= Felix Grimes House =

- U.S. National Register of Historic Places
- Location within Kentucky Location within the United States
- Location: 1301 Leitchfield Rd., Owensboro, Kentucky
- Coordinates: 37°45′55″N 87°05′22″W
- Area: 1 acre (0.40 ha)
- Built: c.1867-76(?)
- NRHP reference No.: 75000746
- Added to NRHP: June 18, 1975

The Felix Grimes House, at 1301 Leitchfield Rd. in Owensboro, Kentucky, was perhaps built around 1867–76. It was listed on the National Register of Historic Places in 1975.

According to family tradition, when working for a Pittsburgh, Pennsylvania firm Felix Grimes identified potential for coal mining and limestone quarrying around what became Hawesville in Hancock County and around what became Cannelton in Perry County, Indiana, and led 40 coal miners into Kentucky by barge down the Ohio River to those areas.

Also by family tradition, Felix Grimes and his cousin Patrick Grimes led the construction of the Indiana Cotton Mill factory on the north bank of the Ohio River in Cannelton, and they also led the construction of the Roman Catholic church on the hill overlooking the factory, both built of local stone.

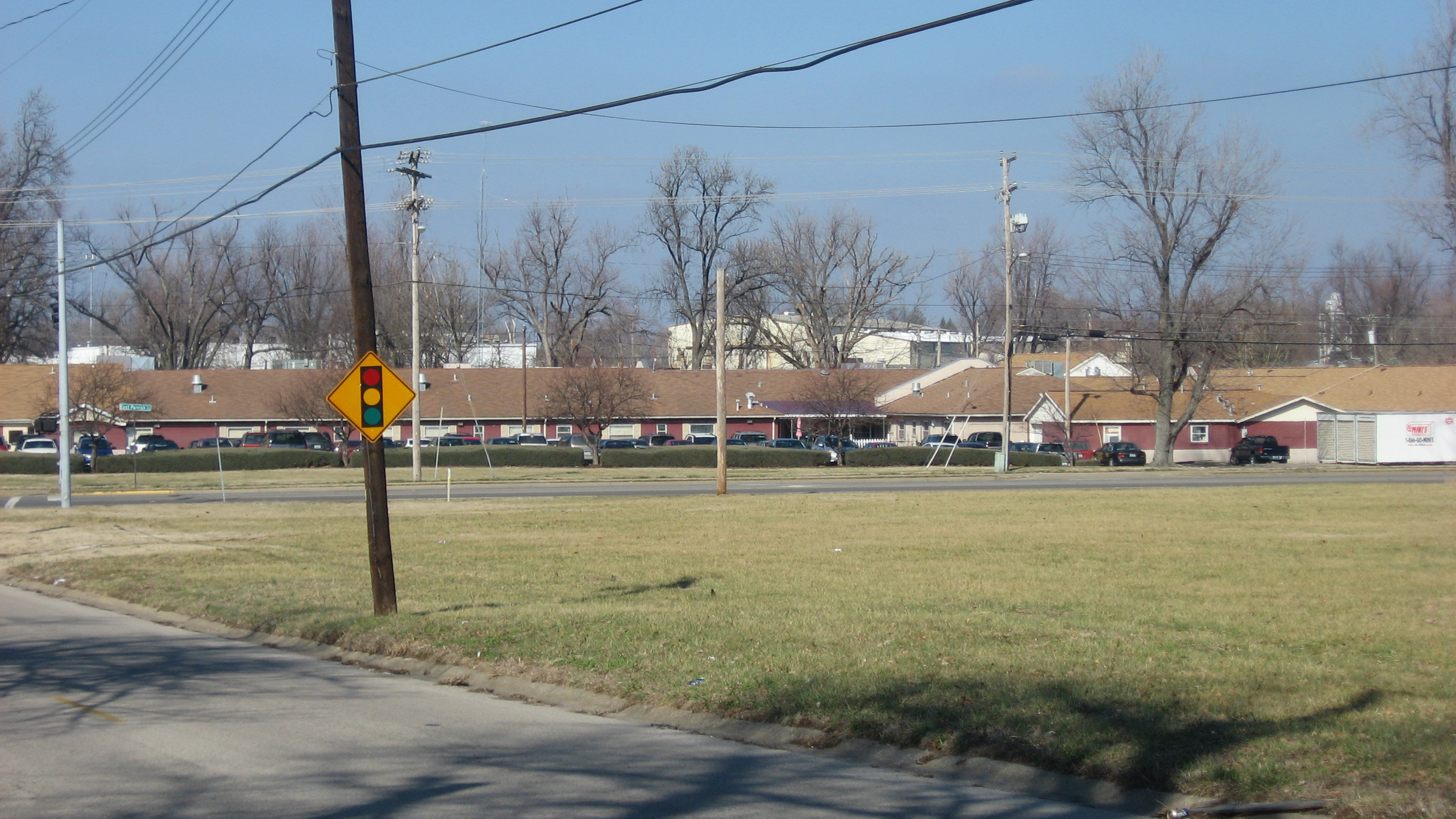
Site of house

The house has been moved or demolished.
