= Gareth Drabble =

English rugby union player

- Born: 6 July 1990 (age 36) Newcastle upon Tyne, England
- Height: 6 ft 1 in (1.85 m)
- Weight: 15 st 6 lb (98 kg)

Rugby union career
- Position: Flanker
Senior career
Years	Team	Apps	(Points)
2006-	Leeds Carnegie		

Gareth Drabble (born 6 July 1990 in Newcastle, England) is a former rugby union player who played for Leeds Carnegie in Premiership Rugby.

Gareth Drabble's position is openside flanker.
