= Toovey =

Toovey is a surname. Notable people with the surname include:

- Alan Toovey (born 1987), Australian rules footballer
- Andrew Toovey (born 1962), English composer
- Dora Toovey (1898–1986), Australian painter
- Ernest Toovey (1922–2012), Australian cricketer
- Geoff Toovey, Australian rugby league player
- Shawn Toovey, American actor
