= Tookey =

Tookey is a surname. Notable people with the surname include:

- Christopher Tookey (born 1950), English film critic
- Mark Tookey (born 1977), Australian former professional rugby league footballer
- Phyllis Margaret Tookey Kerridge (née Tookey, 1901–1940), English chemist and physiologist
- Stacey Tookey (born 1976), Canadian choreographer and dancer
- Tim Tookey (born 1960), Canadian retired ice hockey player

== See also ==
- Tookie (disambiguation)
