= Quinnell =

Quinnell is a surname. Notable people with the name include:

- Craig Quinnell (born 1975), Welsh rugby union player
- Derek Quinnell (born 1949), Welsh rugby union player
- Gavin Quinnell (born 1983), Welsh rugby union player
- Ken Quinnell (born 1939), Australian screenwriter and director
- Sally Quinnell, Australian politician
- Scott Quinnell (born 1972), Welsh rugby league and rugby union player

Pen name

- A. J. Quinnell, a pen name of the English thriller novelist Philip Nicholson

== See also ==
- Quennell
- Quenelle
