= Thurgood Marshall (disambiguation) =

Thurgood Marshall was the first African American to serve on the Supreme Court of the United States.

People and institutions etc. named after Thurgood Marshall are:

- Thurgood Marshall Jr., an American lawyer, son of Thurgood Marshall
- Baltimore-Washington International Thurgood Marshall Airport
- Thurgood Marshall College at the University of California, San Diego
- Thurgood Marshall College Fund
- Thurgood Marshall Federal Judiciary Building, a building housing offices of several agencies of the US federal courts
- Thurgood Marshall School of Law, a law school in Houston, Texas, part of Texas Southern University
- Thurgood Marshall United States Courthouse, a United States courthouse located in Manhattan, New York City, New York

== See also ==
- Thurgood Marshall High School (disambiguation)
