= Anne Seagrim =

British secretary to C.P. Snow and the Duke of Windsor (1914–2011)

- Born: Anne Nott Seagrim; 2 May 1914; Les Vertus, near Dieppe, France
- Died: 10 August 2011 (aged 97)
- Occupations: Secretary, administrator

Anne Nott Seagrim (2 May 1914 – 10 August 2011) was a British secretary and administrator who was amanuensis to C. P. Snow, private secretary to the Duke of Windsor, and administrator of the Winston Churchill Memorial Trust.

== Biography ==
Seagrim was a daughter of Cyril Seagrim, formerly Inspector General of Police in Indore State, India, who had retired to Normandy. She was educated in Dieppe and at a secretarial college in London. She worked for Flight Refuelling Limited, first at RAF Ford in Sussex and then at Malvern where the company was working on the first experimental radar installation on an aircraft.

In 1944 Seagrim moved to London to work for English Electric as private secretary to its Chief Engineer, Teddy Petter, and to its personnel director, C. P. Snow, whose novels she typed and who remained a friend until his death in 1980. In 1950 Seagrim became private secretary to the Duke of Windsor in Paris. She left the Windsors in 1954, going on to be secretary to Lord Alexander of Tunis, who was then chairman of Northern Aluminium (part of Alcan). In 1965 she was appointed administrator of the newly formed Winston Churchill Memorial Trust, becoming Acting Director-General in 1983 before retiring in 1984. She personally found and established the Trust's first office in Queen's Gate Terrace, South Kensington, where it remained until it moved to Westminster in 2010.

One of Seagrim's charitable concerns was with the escalating accommodation costs for students studying in London. She had a property in South Kensington which she converted into flats to be used as student residences. At her death she left a large legacy to Imperial College, London, which established the Anne Seagrim Accommodation Scholarship to be offered to overseas PhD students studying at Imperial.
