= Tubb =

Tubb is a surname, and may refer to:

- Barry Tubb (b. 1963), American film and television actor and director
- Caroline Elizabeth “Carrie” Tubb (1876-1976), English soprano
- Edwin Charles Tubb (1919–2010), British science-fiction author and editor
- Ernest Tubb (1914–1984), American country music singer and songwriter
- Evelyn Tubb, British singer and musician
- Frederick Harold Tubb (1881–1917), Australian army officer; recipient of the Victoria Cross for action in World War I
- Glenn Douglas Tubb (1935–2021, American songwriter
- Henry Tubb (1851–1924), English first-class cricketer and clergyman
- Joseph Tubb (politician) (born 1963), American politician and businessman
- Justin Tubb (1935–1998), American country-music singer and songwriter; son of Ernest Tubb
- Richard Tubb (born 1959), American Air Force officer; physician to President George W. Bush
- Shannon Tubb (born 1980), Australian cricket player
- Tubb, a fictional character in Rubbadubbers
