= Starbuck (surname) =

Starbuck is a surname. Notable people with the surname include:

- D. H. Starbuck (1818–1887), American lawyer and politician
- Dorothy L. Starbuck (1917-1996), American Army officer and civil servant
- Edwin Diller Starbuck (1866–1947), American educational psychologist
- George Starbuck (1931–1996), American poet
- Georgie Starbuck Galbraith (1909–1980), American poet
- Henry F. Starbuck (1860–1935), American architect
- James Starbuck (1912–1997), American choreographer and dancer
- James F. Starbuck (1816–1880), New York politician
- JoJo Starbuck (born 1951), American figure skater
- Paul Starbuck (born 1967), Australian rules footballer
- Phil Starbuck (born 1968), English footballer
- Raymond Starbuck (1878–1965), American football player and railroad executive
- William H. Starbuck (born 1934), organizational scientist
- Michael Majalahti ("Starbuck the Canadian Rebel") (born 1973), Finnish professional wrestler and rock singer
- Starbuck (whaling family) of Nantucket, Massachusetts, credited with the discovery of various Pacific Islands

== See also ==
- Roger Staubach, American football player
