= Dowse (surname) =

Dowse is a surname. Notable people with the surname include:

- Charles Dowse (1862–1934), Irish Anglican bishop
- Denise Dowse (1958–2022), American actress and director
- Edward Dowse (MP) (1582–1648), English politician
- Edward Dowse (1756–1828), American politician
- George Willoughby Dowse (1869–1951), known as "George Willoughby", English comic actor and theatre manager in Australia
- John Dowse (rugby union, born 1891) (1891–1964), Irish rugby union player, later a British Army general
- John Dowse (priest) (died 1892), Dean of Ferns, Ireland
- John Henry Dowse (born 1935), Australian rugby union player
- Michael Dowse (born 1973), Canadian film director
- Percy Dowse (1898–1970), New Zealand politician
- Richard Dowse (1824–1890), Irish politician
- Sydney Dowse (1918–2008), Royal Air Force pilot
- Thomas Dowse (c.1630–1683), English-American politician
- Tom Dowse (1866–1946), American baseball player
- William Dowse (1770–1813), American lawyer
