= Faulkner-Blanchard =

Defunct American motor vehicle manufacturer

The Faulkner-Blanchard was an American brass era automobile manufactured in Detroit, Michigan by the Faulkner-Blanchard Motor Car Company in 1910.

A prototype was made in mid-1910. The vehicle was offered as a five-seater touring car with a six-cylinder engine at 33 hp (25 kW). The vehicle cost $2,500.
