= Drabble (surname) =

Drabble is a British surname.

== Origins ==
Two possible origins have been suggested for the name. One possible source is a derivation from an Old English personal name "Drabbe", from before the 7th-century. This is recorded as a name of a Peterborough festerman, in 963 - 992, in A. J. Robertson's Anglo Saxon Charters.

== Notable people with the surname ==
- Eric Frederic Drabble (1877–1933), English botanist
- Frank Drabble (1888–1964), English footballer
- Gareth Drabble (born 1990), rugby union player
- Geoff Drabble (born 1959), British businessman
- George Wilkinson Drabble (1823–1899), British businessman
- Margaret Drabble (born 1939), English novelist, biographer, and critic
- Phil Drabble (1914–2007), English author and television presenter
