= Tovey =

Tovey is a surname. Notable people with the surname include:

- Arthur Tovey (1904–2000), American film and television actor
- Arthur Gordon Tovey (1901–1974), New Zealand artist
- Bella Tovey (1926–2019), Polish Holocaust survivor
- Bramwell Tovey (1953–2022), British conductor and composer
- Brian Tovey (1926–2015), British intelligence analyst
- Cameron Tovey (born 1985), Australian basketball player
- Derrick Tovey (1926–2015), British pathologist
- Donald Tovey (1875–1940), British musical analyst, musicologist
- Doreen Tovey (1918–2008), English writer
- Eric Tovey, British midget wrestler known as Lord Littlebrook
- Frank Tovey (1956–2002), British musician
- Geoffrey Tovey (1916–2001), physician and hematologist
- Gordon Tovey (1912–1994), English cricketer and schoolmaster
- Hamilton Tovey-Tennent (1782–1866), Scottish army officer
- Jason Tovey (born 1989), Welsh rugby union player
- Jessica Tovey (born 1987), Australian actress
- John Tovey, 1st Baron Tovey (1885–1971), British admiral in World War II
- John Tovey (restaurateur) (1933–2018), British restaurateur and chef
- Mark Tovey (born 1955), South African football player
- Neil Tovey (born 1962), South African football player
- Noel Tovey (1934–2025), Australian dancer and actor
- Richard Tovey (1930–2002), Australian cricketer
- Roberta Tovey (born 1953), English actress
- Russell Tovey (born 1981), English actor
- Wilson Tovey (1874–1950), English cricketer
