= Blanchard Island =

Island in Rock Island County, Illinois, United States

Blanchard Island is an island in the Mississippi River between the U.S. states of Illinois and Iowa at 41°21′17″N 91°03′45″W. Most of the island lies within Drury Township, in Rock Island County, but its southern extremity lies in Eliza Township, Mercer County. The island is one of the more popular recreation sites along the Upper Mississippi River between Petosi, Wisconsin, and Saverton, Missouri.
