= Grimes Octagon Barn =

- U.S. National Register of Historic Places
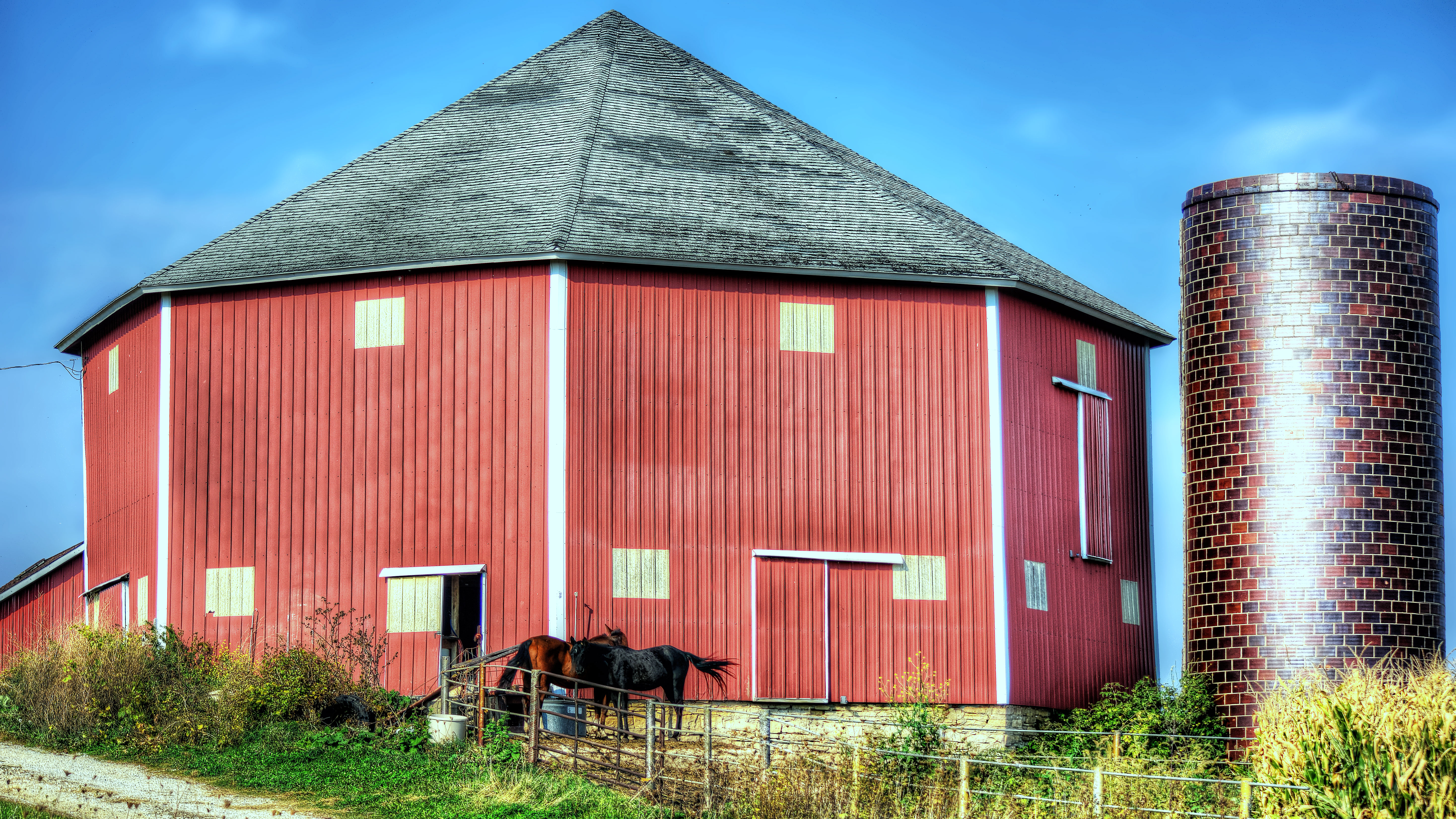

- Location within Iowa Location within the United States
- Location: Off Iowa Highway 56; West Union, Iowa
- Coordinates: 42°56′10″N 91°45′1″W
- Area: less than an acre
- Built: 1880
- Built by: Joe Butler
- MPS: Iowa Round Barns: The Sixty Year Experiment TR
- NRHP reference No.: 86001428
- Added to NRHP: June 30, 1986

The Grimes Octagon Barn is an historic building located near West Union in rural Fayette County, Iowa, United States. It was built by Joe Butler in 1880 for M.W. Grimes. The building is an octagon that measures 65 feet (20 m) in diameter. It is one of 14 known 19th-century octagon barns that still exist on an Iowa farm. The barn features red metal siding, a roof composed of wedge-shaped sections and a hay dormer. The sectional roof marks it as a Stewart type that was named for the New York farmer and agricultural editor Elliott W. Stewart, who designed the prototype in 1874. The barn has been listed on the National Register of Historic Places since 1986.
