= Blanchard-Upton House =

Historic house in Massachusetts, United States

- U.S. National Register of Historic Places
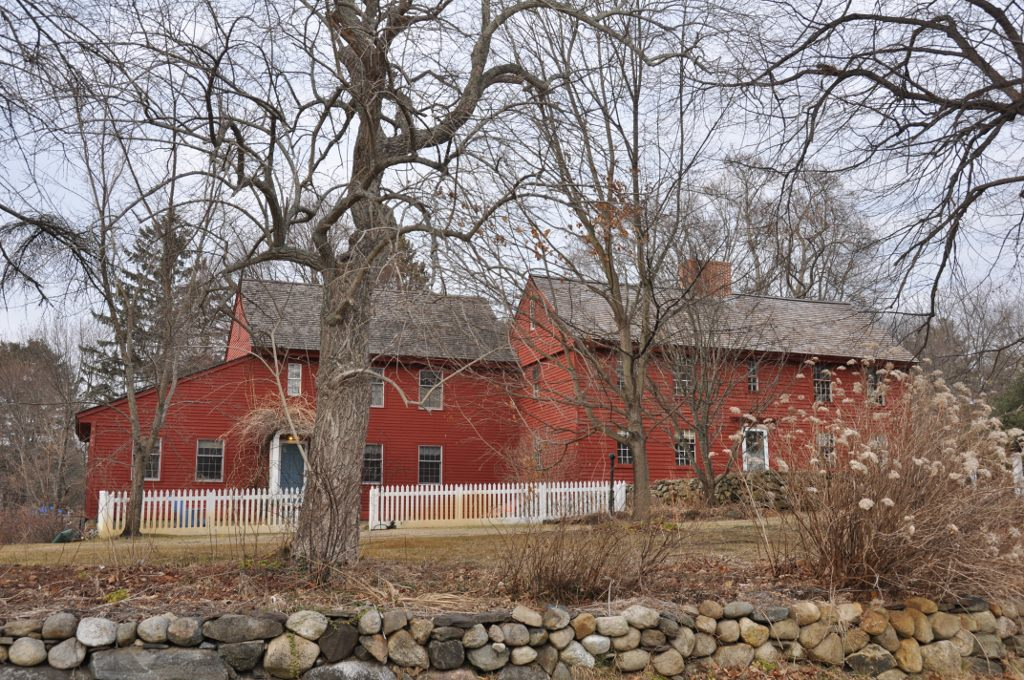

- Location within Massachusetts Location within the United States
- Location: 7 Hearthstone Place, Andover, Massachusetts
- Coordinates: 42°37′53″N 71°11′16″W
- Architectural style: Colonial
- MPS: First Period Buildings of Eastern Massachusetts TR
- NRHP reference No.: 90000192
- Added to NRHP: March 9, 1990

The Blanchard-Upton House is a historic house in Andover, Massachusetts. It is a First Period 2.5-story saltbox, which is distinctive for having an integral leanto section rather than one that was added after other parts of the house. The exact date of its construction is not known: it was probably built by Thomas Blanchard, a cordwainer, sometime between 1699, when he bought the land, and 1740, when he died. There are some features that are suggestive of a later construction date, but these may also have been the result of alterations by Blanchard or his son, who inherited the property.

The house was added to the National Register of Historic Places in 1990, where it is listed at its old address, 62 Osgood Street. At the time of its listing, the property had already been subdivided.

== See also ==
- List of the oldest buildings in Massachusetts
- National Register of Historic Places listings in Andover, Massachusetts
- National Register of Historic Places listings in Essex County, Massachusetts
