= Blanchard House (Boyce, Louisiana) =

Historic house in Louisiana, United States

- U.S. National Register of Historic Places
- Location within Louisiana Location within the United States
- Location: About 2 miles (3,200 m) west of Boyce on Bayou Jean de Jean, in Rapides Parish, Louisiana
- Coordinates: 31°22′57″N 92°42′4″W
- Area: 0.1 acres (0.040 ha)
- Built: 1891
- Architect: Blanchard, Newton Crain
- NRHP reference No.: 82002793
- Added to NRHP: July 22, 1982

The Blanchard House near Boyce, Louisiana was built in 1891 and was added to the National Register of Historic Places in 1982.

It is a frame and clapboard house located about 2 miles (3,200 m) west of Boyce on Bayou Jean de Jean, in Rapides Parish, Louisiana. The house was moved about .25 miles (0.40 km) in 1948, after a flood in 1945 showed that construction of a levee had left it in a flood plain.
