= Ora Blanchard House =

Historic house in Maine, United States

- U.S. National Register of Historic Places
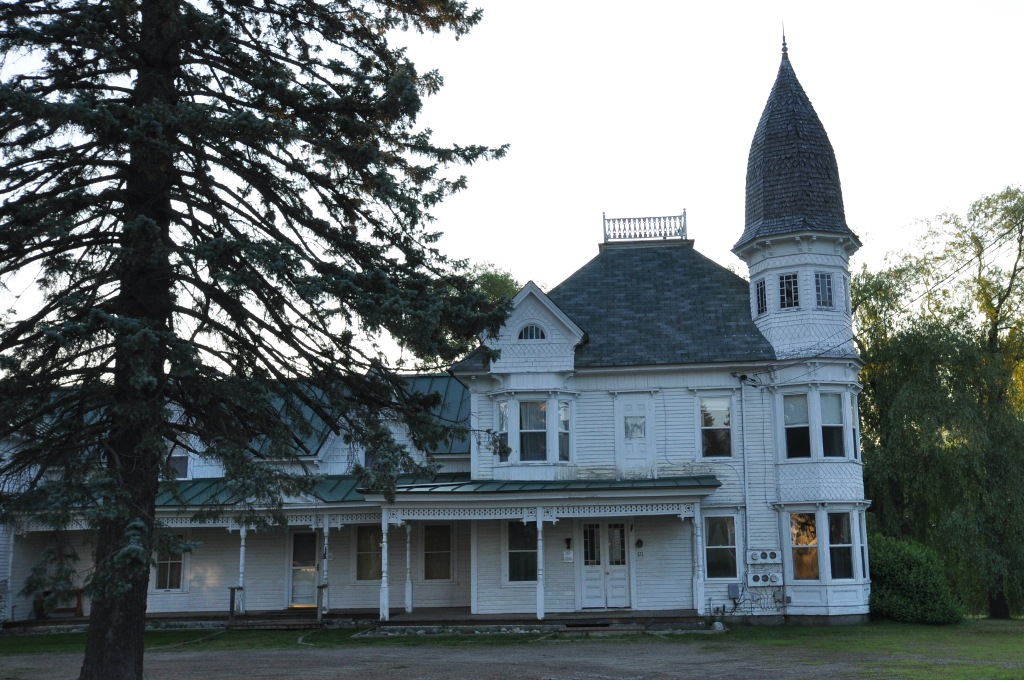

- Location within Maine Location within the United States
- Location: Main Street, Stratton, Maine
- Coordinates: 45°8′32″N 70°26′42″W
- Area: 0.3 acres (0.12 ha)
- Architectural style: Queen Anne
- NRHP reference No.: 80000215
- Added to NRHP: January 15, 1980

The Ora Blanchard House is an historic house at the junction of Maine State Routes 16 and 27 in the center of Stratton, Maine, United States. Also known as Widow's Walk, this wood-frame house, built in 1892, is by far the most distinctive house in the small community, exhibiting a creative collection of Queen Anne features in a remote rural area. It was listed on the National Register of Historic Places in 1980.

== Description and history ==
The main block of the Blanchard House is a 2 1/2-story wood-frame structure, resting on a granite foundation, with a hip roof topped by a widow's walk railing. A 1 1/2-story ell extends northward from this block, and joins it to a two-story barn with hip roof. The dominant feature of the house, located at its southwest corner, is a three-story octagonal tower which is topped by a bell-cast shingled roof. The first level of the tower is one-over-one sash windows above wood panels, and topped by a cornice with paired brackets. The second level has bands of decorative cut shingles, above which are windows and cornice as on the first level. Above this is an entablature band, which continues along the below the roof line of the main block, and which is studded with paired brackets. The third level begins with cut shingles, and has small-paned stained glass windows in each face.

The other prominent feature of the exterior is a single-story shed-roof porch, which extends along much of the length of the western facade, along the main block and the ell. It is supported by turned posts, and has a decorative frieze below the roofline. The leftmost bay of the main block on the western facade has a projecting polygonal bay on the second level, above which is a gable-roofed half-story dormer decorated with cut shingles and a half-round lunette window.

Stratton, with a population of several hundred, is still a remote and small country town where lumber was big business in the late 19th century. Oramendal "Ora" Blanchard owned the local sawmill, and later also owned the local water and power companies when they were established. The house he built in 1892 is a centrally located and distinctive landmark.

== See also ==
- National Register of Historic Places listings in Franklin County, Maine
