= Grimes Creek =

Stream in Boise County, Idaho, U.S.

Coordinates: 43°43′34″N 115°57′07″W

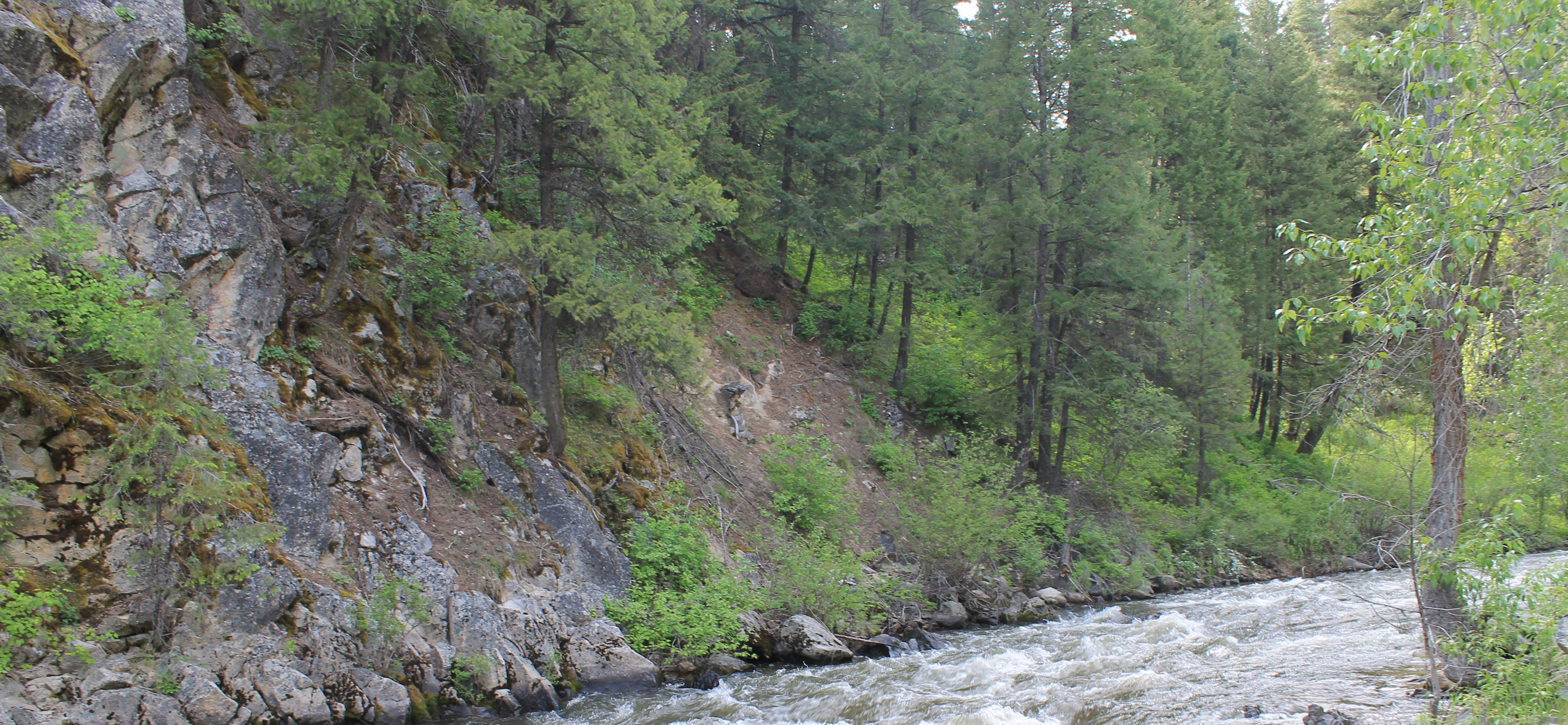
Grimes Creek, 2018

Grimes Creek is a stream in Boise County, in the U.S. state of Idaho.

Grimes Creek was named for George Grimes, a prospector in 1862. George Grimes was killed by Indians near the stream's course.

== See also ==
- List of rivers of Idaho
