= Five Across the Eyes (album) =

Studio album by Iniquity
- Released: November 8, 1999
- Recorded: Aabenraa Studio, May, 1999; Latin Underground Studio, August, 1999 ("Reminiscence")
- Genre: Death metal
- Length: 39:46
- Label: Mighty Music
- Producer: Jacob Hansen

Iniquity chronology
The Hidden Lore (1998)	Five Across the Eyes (1999)	Grime (2001)

Five Across the Eyes is the second studio album by Danish death metal band Iniquity released in 1999 through Mighty Music.

It was later re-issued in 2021.

== Track listing ==
1. "Inhale the Ghost" - 5:23
2. "Surgical Orb" - 4:12
3. "Sidereal Seas" - 5:36
4. "Random Bludgeon Battery" - 4:48
5. "From Tarnished Soil" - 4:40
6. "Reminiscence" - 1:07
7. "Pyres of Atonement" - 4:00
8. "The Rigormortified Grip" - 5:19
9. "Forensic Alliance" - 4:17
10. "Cocooned" (Bonus track on limited digipak version) - 5:15
- All songs arranged by Iniquity, except "Reminiscence" by Carsten Nielsen.

== Credits ==
- Jesper Frost Jensen - drums
- Mads Haarløv - vocals, Guitar
- Thomas Fagerlind - Bass
- Brian Eriksen - Guitar
- Karina - Vocals on "Reminiscence"
- Jacob Hansen - Producer, Engineer, Mixing
