= Mads Haarløv =

Danish musician

Mads Haarløv was the guitarist and vocalist for the Danish death metal band Iniquity. He joined the band in 1993 as a lead guitarist only and left in 1995. He returned in 1999, now as lead guitarist and vocalist too, and stayed until the band's split in 2004.

In 2000 Haarløv formed a death metal band with Morten Løwe Sørensen and fellow Iniquity members, Kræn Meier and Martin Rosendahl called Strangler which has released one demo so far, Infinite Blood Abundance in 2004. The band is still active and have recently acquired the vocal talents of Dave Ingram who also sings for fellow Danish metallers Downlord.

Haarløv was also a session guitarist for Corpus Mortale.

When Mads Haarløv and Jacob Olsen left Iniquity they formed Swollen. Iniquity had later some conflicts with the members and therefore Swollen split up and Haarløv and Thomas Fagerlind (bassist for Swollen) went to Iniquity. Three songs of Swollen's 1999 promo are to be found on Iniquity's Five Across the Eyes.
