= Blanchard House (Syracuse, New York) =

Historic house in New York, United States

- U.S. National Register of Historic Places
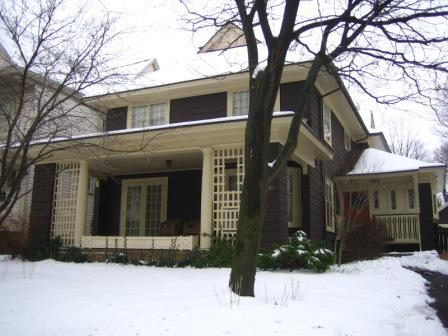

- Location within New York Location within the United States
- Interactive map showing the location of Blanchard House
- Location: 329 Westcott St., Syracuse, New York
- Coordinates: 43°2′38.91″N 76°7′10.37″W
- Built: 1914
- Architect: Ward Wellington Ward
- MPS: Architecture of Ward Wellington Ward in Syracuse MPS
- NRHP reference No.: 97000094
- Added to NRHP: February 14, 1997

The Blanchard House, also known as the Blanchard Residence, is a Ward Wellington Ward-designed home built in 1914 in Syracuse, New York, United States. It was listed on the National Register of Historic Places in 1997. An arbor in the back yard and a garage at the rear of the property were both also designed by Ward.

The property was first owned by Orlo Blanchard, Vice President of Burhans and Black.

== Gallery ==
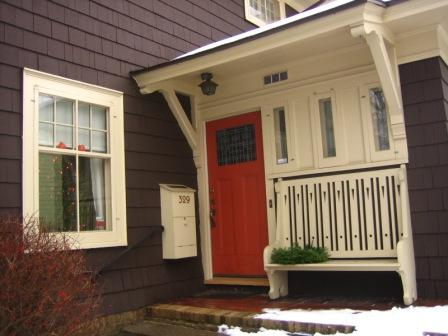
Detail, December 2008

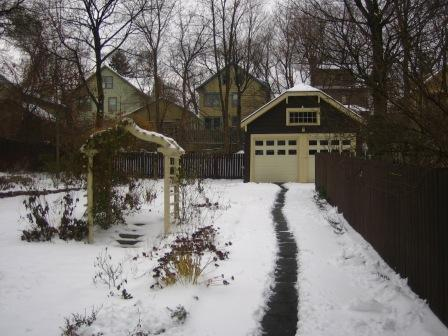
Arbor and garage; the arbor has been rebuilt following the original design.
