= Grimes (surname) =

Grimes is a surname that is believed to be of a Scandinavian, English, or Irish descent.

== Notable people with the surname "Grimes" ==
=== A ===
- Alexander Grimes (born 1965), English cricketer
- Alison Lundergan Grimes (born 1978), American politician
- Anne Grimes (1912–2004), American journalist
- Aoibhinn Grimes (born 1976), Canadian field hockey player
- Ashley Grimes (disambiguation), several people

- Ashley Grimes (footballer, born 1957) (born 1957), former Irish footballer
- Ashley Grimes (footballer, born 1986) (born 1986), English footballer

=== B ===
- Bernard Grimes, American table tennis player
- Betty Grimes (1899–1976), American diver
- Billy Grimes (1927–2005), American football player
- Brent Grimes (born 1983), American football player
- Brittney Grimes, American poet
- Bryan Grimes (1828–1880), American general
- Burleigh Grimes (1893–1985), American baseball player

=== C ===
- Cameron Grimes (born 1993), American professional wrestler
- Camryn Grimes (born 1990), American actress
- Carol Grimes (born 1944), British singer-songwriter
- Charles Grimes (disambiguation), several people

- Charles Grimes (surveyor) (1772–1858), English surveyor in colonial Australia
- Charles Grimes (rower) (1935–2007), American rower

- Chelcee Grimes (born 1992), British singer-songwriter
- Christine Grimes (born 1950), British lawn bowler
- Christine Grimes (rower), British rower
- Christopher M. Grimes (born 1948), Bermudian artist
- Connor Grimes (born 1983), American field hockey player

=== D ===
- David Grimes (disambiguation), multiple people

- David Grimes (American football) (born 1986), American football wide receiver
- David Grimes (composer) (born 1948), American composer
- David Grimes (physician) (born 1947), American physician and abortion provider
- David Robert Grimes (born 1985), physicist and cancer researcher at the University of Oxford
- David Grimes (meteorologist), Canadian meteorologist

- Darren Grimes (born 1993), British political commentator
- Denis Grimes (1864–1920), Irish sportsperson
- Doris Grimes (1909–1987), British diver
- Don Grimes (1937–2021), Australian politician
- Dylan Grimes (born 1991), Australian rules footballer

=== E ===
- Éamonn Grimes (born 1947), Irish hurler
- Ed Grimes (1905–1974), American baseball player
- Edward Grimes (disambiguation), multiple people

- Edward Grimes (politician) (c.1811–1859), Victorian MLC
- Edward Grimes (singer) (born 1991), one of the Irish singing twins known as Jedward

- Elizabeth A. Grimes (born 1954), American judge
- Edward J Grimes (born 1978)American entrepreneur, Contractor

=== F ===
- Frances Grimes (1869–1963), American sculptor
- Steve Grimes (born 1947), Irish actor

=== G ===
- Gary Grimes (born 1955), American actor
- Gassaway Sellman Grimes (1816–1875), American physician
- Ged Grimes (born 1962), Scottish musician
- George Grimes (disambiguation), multiple people

- George Grimes (American football) (1922–1971), NFL football player for the Detroit Lions
- George Grimes (English politician) (1605–1657), member of parliament and Royalist
- George Grimes (Queensland politician) (1835–1910), Queensland MLA
- George F. Grimes (1877–1929), businessman and political figure in Newfoundland

=== H ===
- Hamil Grimes (born 1956), Barbadian sprinter
- Henry Grimes (1935–2020), American musician
- Howard Grimes (1941–2022), American drummer

=== J ===
- Jack Grimes (disambiguation), multiple people

- Jack Grimes (actor) (1926–2009), American actor
- Jack Grimes (footballer) (born 1989), Australian rules footballer

- James Grimes (disambiguation), multiple people

- James W. Grimes, American statesman
- James Grimes (soccer) (born 1968), Canadian striker
- James Walter Grimes (born 1953), American botanist
- James Grimes, involved in the St Kilda Road robberies

- Jamie Grimes (born 1990), English footballer
- Jane Brown Grimes (1941–2021), American sports administrator
- Jason Grimes (born 1959), American long jumper
- Jeff Grimes (born 1968), American football coach
- Jesse Grimes (1788–1866), American politician
- John Grimes (disambiguation), multiple people

- Dr. John Grimes (1802–1875), Quaker anti-slavery advocate
- John Grimes (bishop of Christchurch) (1842–1915), first Roman Catholic bishop of Christchurch, New Zealand
- John Grimes (bishop of Syracuse) (1852–1922), Roman Catholic bishop
- John Bryan Grimes (1868–1923), North Carolina Democratic politician and farmer
- John Grimes (baseball) (1869–1964), American baseball player
- John Grimes (priest) (1881–1976), Anglican Archdeacon of Northampton
- John Grimes, former U.S. Assistant Secretary of Defense for Networks and Information Integration (2005-2009)
- John Grimes (singer) (born 1991), member of the Irish pop rap duo Jedward

- Jonathan Grimes (born 1989), American football player
- Joseph Rudolph Grimes (1923–2007), Liberian politician

=== K ===
- Karolyn Grimes (born 1940), American actress
- Katie Grimes (born 2006), American swimmer
- Ken Grimes (born 1947), American artist
- Kevin Grimes (disambiguation), several people

- Kevin Grimes (ice hockey) (born 1979), retired Canadian ice hockey player
- Kevin Grimes (soccer) (born 1967), former U.S. soccer defender

- Kylie Grimes (born 1987), British para-athlete

=== L ===
- Leonard Grimes (1815–1873), American pastor
- Louis Arthur Grimes (1883–1948), Liberian judge
- Louise Grimes (1907–1990), Australian musician
- Luke Grimes (born 1984), American actor

=== M ===
- Mark Grimes, Canadian politician
- Martha Grimes (born 1931), American writer
- Marty Grimes (born 1962), American skateboarder
- Mason Grimes (born 1992), Guamanian footballer
- Matt Grimes (born 1995), English footballer
- Michael Grimes (disambiguation), several people

- Michael Grimes (investment banker) (born 1966), American technologist and banker
- Michael Grimes (scientist) (1888–1977), Irish professor of microbiology

- Mickey Grimes (born 1976), American sprinter

=== N ===
- Nate Grimes (born 1996), American basketball player in the Israeli Basketball Premier League
- Nikki Grimes (born 1950), American author
- Norman Grimes (born 1998), American athlete

=== O ===
- Oona Grimes (born 1957), British artist
- Oscar Grimes (1915–1993), American baseball player

=== P ===
- Paul Grimes (disambiguation), multiple people

- Paul Grimes (criminal) (born 1950), English former gangster
- Paul Grimes (public servant), Australian public servant

gangster

- Paul Grimes (Chartered Engineer), English former Royal Air Force Officer

- Phil Grimes (1929–1989), Irish hurler

=== Q ===
- Quentin Grimes (born 2000), American basketball player

=== R ===
- Rachael Grimes, British army officer
- Randy Grimes (born 1960), American football player
- Ray Grimes (1893–1953), American baseball player
- Regan Grimes, American bodybuilder
- Reggie Grimes (born 1976), American football player
- Sir Robin Grimes, English physicist
- Roger Grimes (born 1950), Canadian politician
- Roy Grimes (1893–1954), American baseball player

=== S ===
- Sandra Grimes (1945–2025), American intelligence officer
- Scott Grimes (born 1971), American actor
- Shenae Grimes (born 1989), Canadian-American actress
- Solomon Grimes (born 1987), Liberian footballer
- Stephen Grimes (disambiguation), several people

- Stephen B. Grimes (1927–1988), English production designer and art director
- Stephen H. Grimes (1927–2021), American lawyer and jurist

- Stuart Grimes (born 1974), Scottish rugby union footballer

=== T ===
- Tammy Grimes (1934–2016), American actress and singer
- Thomas Grimes (disambiguation), one person apart from Tom Grimes

- Thomas Wingfield Grimes (1844–1905), American politician

- Tilly Grimes, British costume designer
- Tinsley Grimes, American actress
- Tiny Grimes (1916–1989), American guitarist
- Tom Grimes, American novelist
- Trevon Grimes (born 1998), American football player

=== V ===
- Vic Grimes (born 1970), American professional wrestler
- Vince Grimes (born 1954), English footballer

=== W ===
- Warren G. Grimes (1898–1975), American entrepreneur
- W. F. Grimes (1905–1988), British archaeologist
- William Grimes (disambiguation), multiple people

- William C. Grimes (Oklahoma politician) (1857–1931), American politician and businessman
- William Grimes (journalist) (born 1959), wrote for The New York Times
- W. F. Grimes (1905–1988), Welsh archaeologist
- William Grimes (footballer) (1886–?), with Bradford City and Derby County
- William Grimes (ex-slave) (1784–1865), author
- William P. Grimes (1868–1939), American politician in Wisconsin

- Willie Grimes (disambiguation), multiple people

== Fictional characters ==
- Carl Grimes, in the comic book and television series The Walking Dead
- Frank Grimes, from the animated sitcom The Simpsons
- John Grimes, in a series of novels by A. Bertram Chandler
- John Grimes, in the film Black Hawk Down
- Lori Grimes, in the comic book and television series The Walking Dead
- Morgan Grimes, in the television series Chuck
- Rick Grimes, in the comic book and television series The Walking Dead

== See also ==
- Grimes (disambiguation), a disambiguation page for "Grimes"
