= The Establishment (club) =

Former London nightclub

Coordinates: 51°30′50″N 0°07′50″W

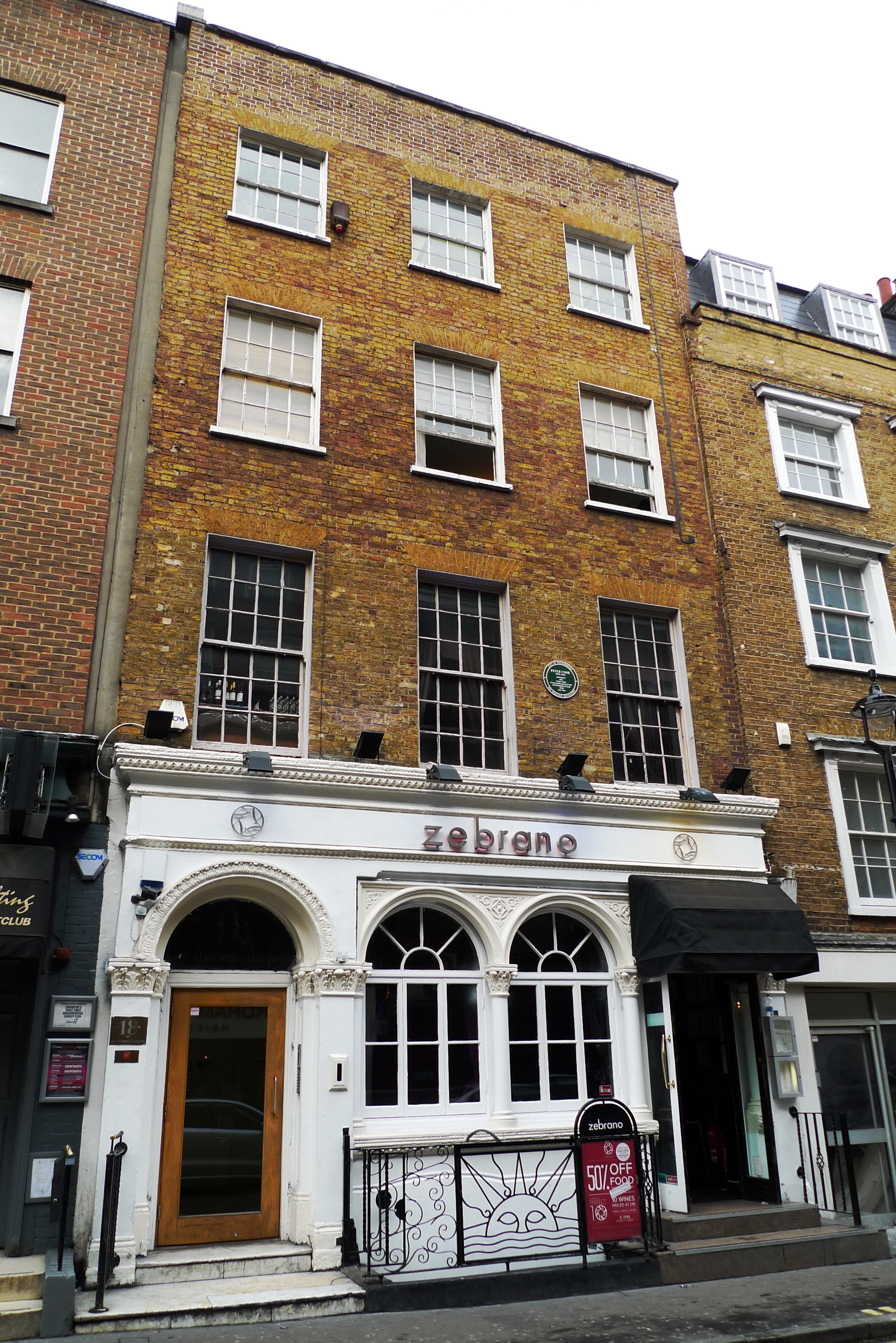
The site of the Establishment, now home to Zebrano. The building has a green plaque commemorating Peter Cook's co-founding of the Establishment.

The Establishment was a nightclub that opened in October 1961, at 18 Greek Street, Soho, and which became known in retrospect for satire although at the time was a venue more commonly booking jazz acts and used for other events. It was founded by Peter Cook and Nicholas Luard, both of whom were also important in the history of the magazine Private Eye. The name "The Establishment" is a play on the meaning of "establishment" as in "institution," i.e. the club itself, and the broader definition meaning the prevailing social order of the time, which the satirists who founded, funded and performed at the club typically undermined. A pun is suggested as, to be a member of this club, was to literally but not figuratively be a "member of the establishment". Peter Cook called it "the only good title I ever came up with."

The venue allowed the opportunity for budding comedians and satirists to perform new material in a nightclub setting, outside the jurisdiction of the Lord Chamberlain, whose censorship of language and content was a problem for many performers. Some who appeared included Lenny Bruce in 1962 (subsequently banned from entering the UK a year later), Barry Humphries (as Edna Everage), and musically, The Dudley Moore Trio. The Establishment, a tie-in album of comedy routines and sketches featuring John Bird, John Fortune, Eleanor Bron and Jeremy Geidt, was released on the Parlophone label in 1963. The club was also frequented by members of The Beatles.

A second club was established in New York City in 1963. However, both folded after only a few years. The Establishment in Westminster closed in 1964.

== Legacy ==
In March 2008, the site of the club was renamed Zebrano but after a small group of Peter Cook devotees, Sally Western, Jonathan Hansler and Robert Ross, pressured the management for some recognition of the old club's importance in satire, the owners agreed to place "The Establishment" in writing above the door. A green plaque was also positioned above the door by Westminster City Council after campaigning by the same group.

The Establishment was referenced in the book Stop-Time by author Frank Conroy. The book is a semi-autobiographical account of Conroy's own life, and he mentions getting drunk at The Establishment, and then racing his car home to his apartment outside London while he was living in England with his wife in the '60s. The Establishment also featured briefly in the semi-fictional Peter Cook and Dudley Moore biopic Not Only But Always (2004); seen only in an exterior shot, it bore no resemblance to 18 Greek Street.

The location of the original venue currently operates as a bar as of July 2024.
