= Hit by pitch =

Baseball statistic

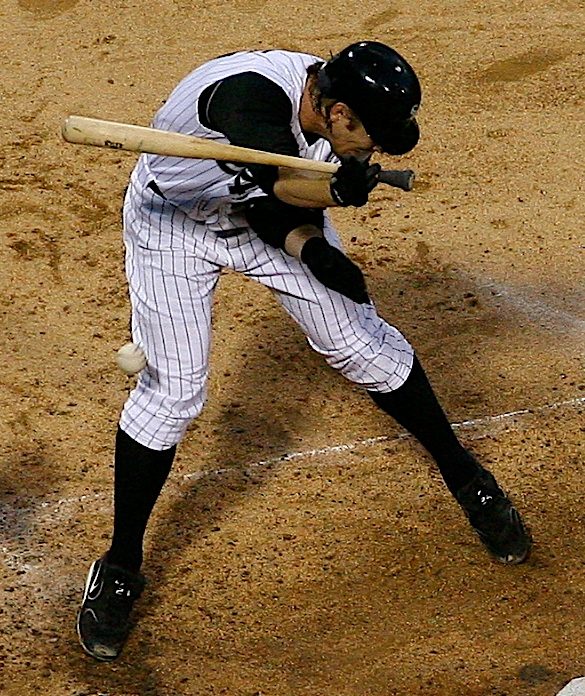
Joe Crede of the Chicago White Sox being hit by a pitch

In baseball, hit by pitch (HBP) is an event in which a batter or his clothing or equipment (other than his bat) is struck directly by a pitch from the pitcher; the batter is called a hit batsman (HB). A hit batsman is awarded first base, provided that (in the plate umpire's judgment) he made an honest effort to avoid the pitch, although failure to do so is rarely called by an umpire. Being hit by a pitch is often caused by a batter standing too close to, or "crowding", home plate.

The rule dates from 1887; before that, a pitch that struck the batter was merely a ball.

== Official rule ==
Per baseball official rule 5.05(b), a batter becomes a baserunner and is awarded first base when he or his equipment (except for his bat):

- is touched by a pitched ball outside the strike zone,
- and he attempts to avoid it (or has no opportunity to avoid it),
- and he did not swing at the pitch.

If all these conditions are met, the ball is dead, and other baserunners advance if they are forced to vacate their base by the batter taking first. Rule 5.09(a) further clarifies that a hit by pitch is also called when a pitch touches a batter's clothing.

In the case where a batter swings and the pitch hits him anyway, the ball is dead and a strike is called. If the batter does not attempt to avoid the pitch, he is not awarded first base, and the pitch is ruled either a strike if in the strike zone or a ball if out of the strike zone. Umpires rarely make this call. A famous instance of a non-hit by pitch was on May 31, 1968, when Don Drysdale hit Dick Dietz with a pitch that would have forced in a run and ended Drysdale's scoreless innings streak at 44. Umpire Harry Wendelstedt ruled that Dietz made no effort to avoid the pitch; Dietz proceeded to fly out, and Drysdale's scoreless streak continued to a then-record 58 2/3 innings. Another notable example was the first game of the 2022 World Series. In the bottom of the 10th inning, Philadelphia Phillies pitcher David Robertson was pitching to Houston Astros pinch hitter Aledmys Diaz. With 2 balls and no strikes, two out, and two runners in scoring position, Robertson threw a pitch inside that struck Diaz's left arm. Home plate umpire James Hoye ruled that Diaz did not attempt to avoid the pitch and called the pitch a ball. Diaz, who had begun to take first base before Hoye called time, disputed the call, and would go on to ground out to end the game.

A hit-by-pitch can also be called on a pitch that has first touched the ground before hitting the batter. Such a bouncing pitch is like any other, and if a batter is hit by such a pitch, he will be awarded first unless he made no attempt to avoid it (and he had an opportunity to avoid it).

A batter hit by a pitch is not credited with a hit or at bat, but is credited with a time on base and a plate appearance; therefore, being hit by a pitch does not increase or decrease a player's batting average but does increase his on-base percentage. A batter who is hit by a pitch with the bases loaded is also credited with an RBI per MLB rule 10.04(a)(2). A pitch ruled a hit by pitch is recorded as a ball in the pitcher's pitch count, since by definition, the ball must be outside the strike zone and not have been swung at.

The rule awarding first base to a batter hit by a pitch was instituted in 1887.

== Tactical use ==
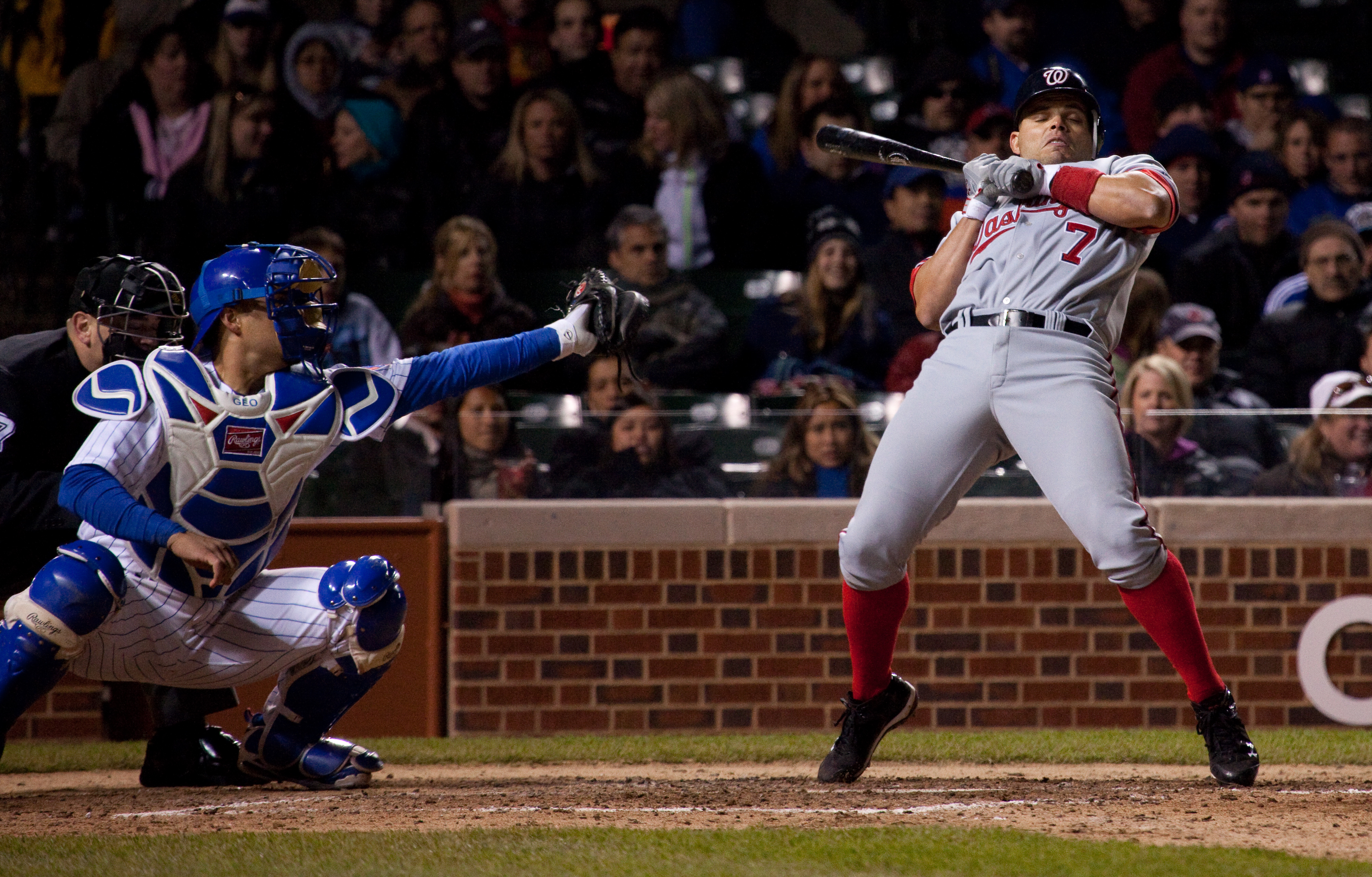
Iván Rodríguez (right) of the Washington Nationals is brushed back by an inside pitch during a 2010 game at Wrigley Field.

Inside pitching is a common and legal tactic in baseball, and many players make use of brushback pitches, or pitches aimed underneath the chin, commonly referred to as "chin music", to keep players away from the plate. "Headhunter" is a common term for pitchers who have a reputation for throwing these kinds of pitches. However, throwing at a batter intentionally is illegal, and can be very dangerous. When an umpire suspects that a pitcher has thrown at a batter intentionally, but is not certain, a warning is issued to the pitcher and the managers of both teams. From that point on, any pitch thrown at a batter can cause the pitcher and the manager of the offending team to be ejected immediately from the game. Serious offenses such as a ball thrown at the head (called a beanball) can result in the immediate ejection of the pitcher, and the manager if he ordered the beanball, even without a warning. If the umpire is certain that the pitcher intentionally hit the batter with the pitch, the pitcher is ejected from the game with no warning. This infamously happened on August 15, 2018, when José Ureña was ejected from a game against the Atlanta Braves after hitting Ronald Acuña Jr. on the elbow with the first pitch of the game, which led to the Braves' and Marlins' benches emptying.

Occasionally, if a player is acting rude or unsportsmanlike, or having an extraordinarily good day, the pitcher may intentionally hit the batter, disguising it as a pitch that accidentally slipped his control. Managers may also order a pitcher to throw such a pitch (sometimes called a "plunking"). These pitches are typically aimed at the lower back and slower than normal, designed to send a message more than anything else. The opposing team usually hits a batter in retaliation for this act. The plunkings generally end there because of umpire warnings, but in some cases things can get out of hand, and sometimes they lead to the batter charging the mound, bench-clearing brawls, and several ejections.

== Beanball ==
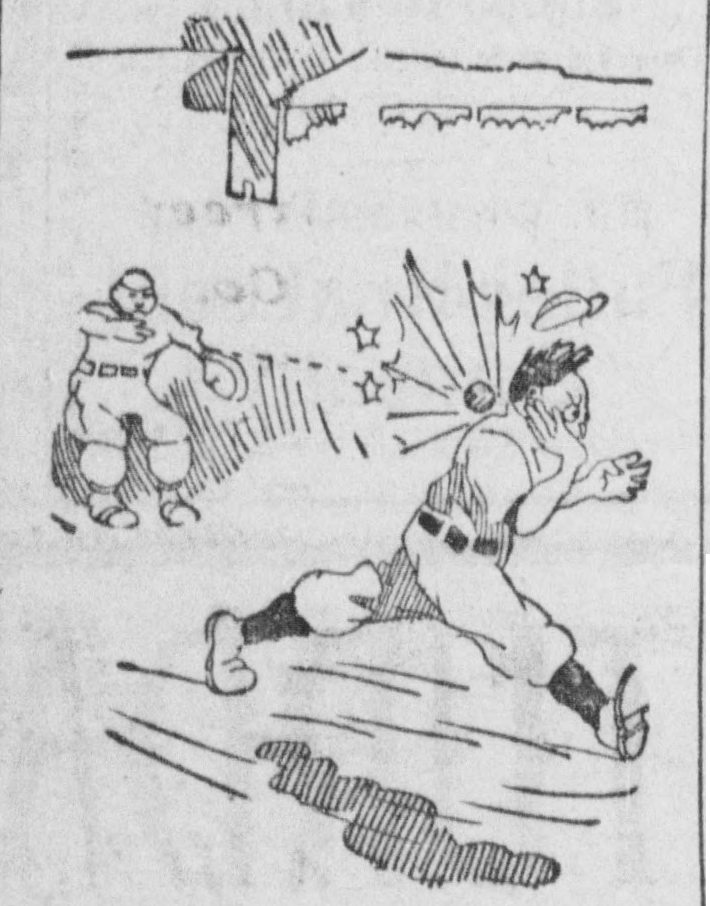
Runner hit by ball

"Beanball" is a colloquialism used in baseball, for a ball thrown at an opposing player with the intention of striking them such as to cause harm, often connoting a throw at the player's head (or "bean" in old-fashioned slang). A pitcher who throws beanballs often is known as a "headhunter". The term may be applied to any sport in which a player on one team regularly attempts to throw a ball toward the general vicinity of a player of the opposite team, but is typically expected not to hit that player with the ball. In cricket, the equivalent term is "beamer". Some people use the term "beaner", though that usage is discouraged due to the term also being an ethnic slur in the United States.

== Records ==
Korea Baseball Organization third baseman Choi Jeong holds the Korean Baseball Organization hit by pitch record with 360. It is also the world record. The all-time record for a player being hit by a pitch in MLB is held by Hughie Jennings, who was hit by 287 pitches between 1891 and 1903. The modern-era record is held by Craig Biggio of the Houston Astros, who had 285 as of the end of the 2007 season when he retired. Prior to Biggio, the modern-era record belonged to Don Baylor, who was hit 267 times.

The all-time single-season record also belongs to Jennings, who was hit 51 times during the 1896 season. Ron Hunt of the 1971 Montreal Expos was hit 50 times during that year, the modern-era record. The single-game record is three, held by numerous players.

The all-time record for pitchers is held by Gus Weyhing with 277 (1887–1901). The modern-era career pitching record for most hit batsmen is 205 by Hall-of-Famer Walter Johnson. The season record is 54 by Phil Knell in 1891, and the game record is six, held by Ed Knouff and John Grimes. On September 1, 2021, Austin Adams became the first pitcher hitting batters 20 or more times with 120 or less IPs in a season. Ed Doheny hit batters 22 times in 133.2 IP in 1900.

A total of eleven MLB players have been hit twice in a single inning; three in American League games, six in National League games, and two in an interleague game:

- On April 26, 1959, Willard Schmidt of the Cincinnati Reds became the first such player in MLB history (and in a National League game), being hit twice in the bottom of the 3rd inning by Milwaukee Braves pitchers Lew Burdette and Bob Rush.
- On April 29, 1962, Frank Thomas of the New York Mets was hit twice in the bottom of the 4th inning of game 1 of a doubleheader by Philadelphia Phillies pitchers Art Mahaffey and Frank Sullivan.
- On July 12, 1996, Andrés Galarraga of the Colorado Rockies was hit twice in the bottom of the 7th inning by San Diego Padres pitchers Bryce Florie and Willie Blair.
- On May 23, 1999, Brady Anderson of the Baltimore Orioles became the first such player in an American League game, getting hit twice in the bottom of the 1st inning by Texas Rangers pitcher Mike Morgan.
- On September 8, 2008, Mike Hessman of the Detroit Tigers was hit twice in the bottom of the 2nd inning by Oakland Athletics pitchers Gio González and Josh Outman.
- On September 23, 2010, José Guillén of the San Francisco Giants was hit twice in the top of the 2nd inning by Chicago Cubs pitcher Ryan Dempster.
- On June 18, 2012, David DeJesus of the Chicago Cubs became the first such player in an interleague game, getting hit twice in the top of the 7th inning by Chicago White Sox pitchers Will Ohman and Hector Santiago.
- On April 25, 2014, Brandon Moss of the Oakland Athletics was hit twice in the top of the 9th inning by Houston Astros pitchers Josh Fields and Anthony Bass.
- On April 28, 2025, Francisco Lindor of the New York Mets was hit twice in the top of the 7th inning by Washington Nationals pitcher Cole Henry.
- On May 31, 2025, CJ Abrams of the Washington Nationals was hit twice in the top of the 1st inning by two different Arizona Diamondbacks pitchers: Brandon Pfaadt and Scott McGough.
- On May 22, 2026, Sam Antonacci of the Chicago White Sox was hit twice in the top of the 4th inning by two different San Francisco Giants pitchers: Trevor McDonald and Ryan Borucki.

Three times has a perfect game been broken up by the 27th batter being hit by pitch. Hooks Wiltse, Max Scherzer, and Joe Musgrove hold this rare feat. All three finished with no-hitters after the hit by pitch. Scherzer's team was leading 6–0 and Musgrove's 3–0 when they pitched their no-hitters, but Wiltse's team was scoreless through 9; he pitched a 10-inning 1–0 no-hitter. The record for most hit batters in a no-hitter is three, held by Chris Heston of the San Francisco Giants for his 2015 effort against the New York Mets.

Postseason career records are held by Greg Maddux and Tim Wakefield—each of whom hit 9 batters—and Shane Victorino, who was hit by pitch 11 times.

== Dangers ==
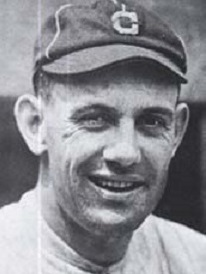
Ray Chapman, killed by a pitch thrown by Carl Mays in 1920.

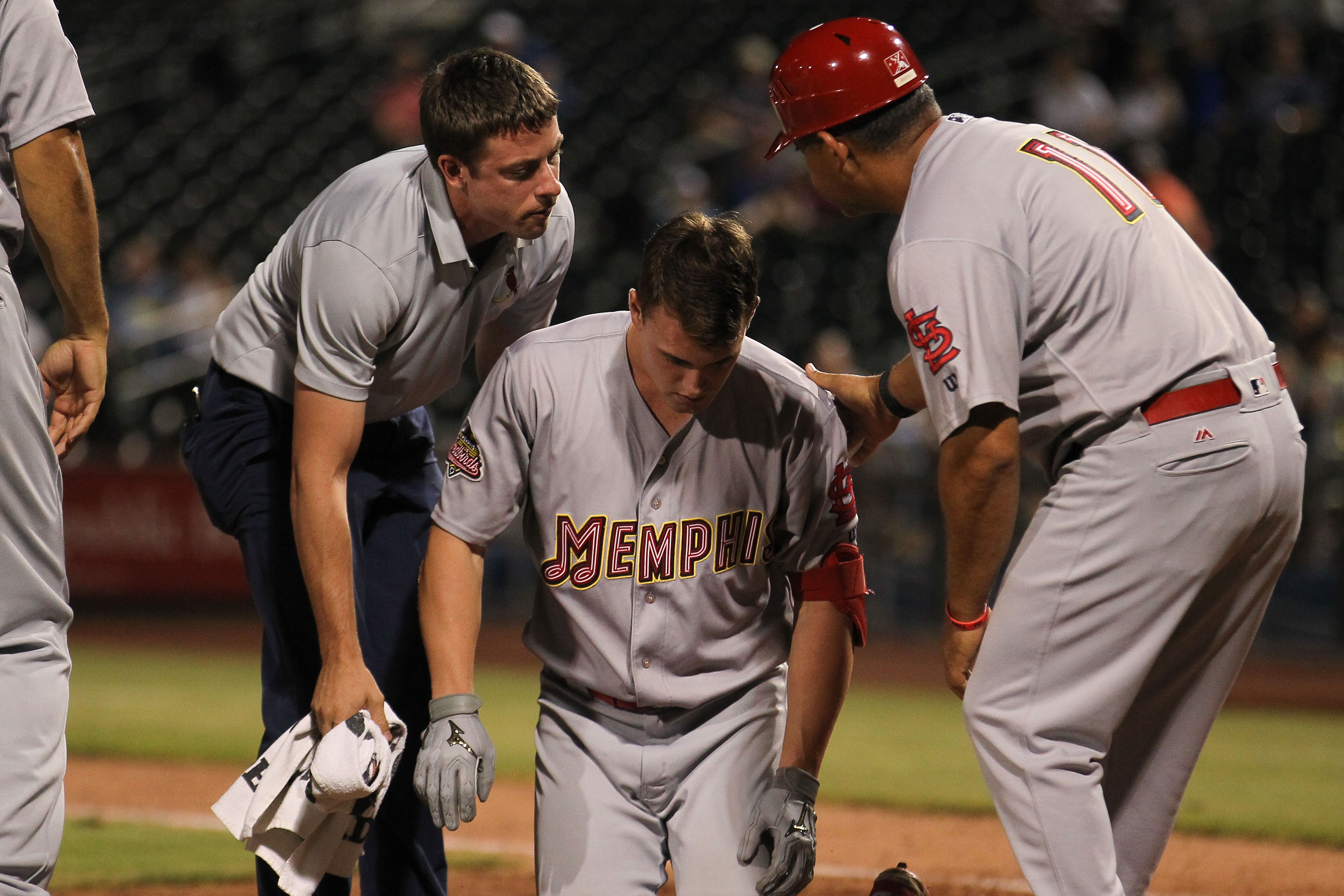
Lane Thomas of the Memphis Redbirds is evaluated for injury after being hit by a pitch in a 2019 game.

One major-league player died as a result of being struck by a pitch: Ray Chapman of the Cleveland Indians was hit in the head by Carl Mays on August 16, 1920, and died the next morning.

Serious injuries may result from being hit by a pitch, even when wearing a batting helmet. On August 18, 1967, Boston Red Sox batter Tony Conigliaro was hit almost directly in the left eye by a fastball thrown by Jack Hamilton of the California Angels. His cheekbone was shattered; he nearly lost the sight of the eye, was unable to play for over a year, and never regained his earlier batting ability. At the time, batting helmets were not required to have an "ear flap"; it was not until 2002 that all major-league batters were required to wear helmets with side-protection. Ron Santo was the first player to wear a helmet with an improvised ear-flap; he had it made after he was struck by a pitch from Jack Fisher of the New York Mets on June 26, 1966, which briefly knocked Santo unconscious and left him with a fractured cheekbone.

Other notable injuries include:

- Mickey Cochrane of the Detroit Tigers was hit in the head by a pitch from Bump Hadley of the New York Yankees on May 25, 1937. Cochrane nearly died from his injuries and never played again; he was inducted to the National Baseball Hall of Fame in 1947.
- Kirby Puckett of the Minnesota Twins was struck in the cheek by a Dennis Martínez fastball on September 28, 1995, breaking his jaw and loosening two teeth. It was Puckett's last regular-season game; during spring training the following year he developed glaucoma, which ended his career; he was inducted to the Hall of Fame in 2001.
- Mike Piazza, then with the Mets, was hit in the head by a pitch from Julián Tavárez of the St. Louis Cardinals on September 10, 2005. Piazza's helmet shattered and he suffered a concussion; he went on to play in MLB through 2007 and was inducted to the Hall of Fame in 2016.

Other comparably minor injuries that are possible include broken fingers or hands, broken feet, broken ribs, injuries to the knee, or groin injuries.

== Legal interpretation ==
Since inside pitching is a legitimate tactic in baseball, courts have recognized that being hit by a pitch is an inherent risk of the game, so that players cannot sue for any resulting injuries. On April 6, 2006, in a case arising from a game involving community college baseball teams, the Supreme Court of California ruled that baseball players in California assume the risk of being hit by baseballs even if the balls were intentionally thrown so as to cause injury. In the court's words: "For better or worse, being intentionally thrown at is a fundamental part and inherent risk of the sport of baseball. It is not the function of tort law to police such conduct."
