= Jeffrey W. Johnson =

American judge

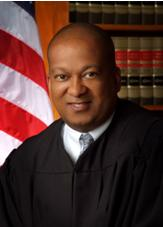
- Justice Jeffrey W. Johnson

Justice of the California Court of Appeal for the Second District
- In office August 3, 2009 – January 27, 2021
- Appointed by: Arnold Schwarzenegger

Magistrate Judge of the United States District Court for the Central District of California
- In office April 1999 – August 2009

Personal details
- Born: October 7, 1960 (age 65) Columbia, South Carolina
- Education: Duke University (B.A.); Yale Law School (J.D.)

Jeffrey W. Johnson (born October 7, 1960, in Columbia, South Carolina) is a former Associate Justice of the California Court of Appeal. In June 2020, the California Commission on Judicial Performance ordered his removal, finding him liable for eighteen acts of prejudicial misconduct, including misconduct of a sexual or otherwise inappropriate nature; a hearing appealing this order was rejected by the California Supreme Court in January 2021, making his removal final. Johnson thus became the first California appellate justice removed for such misconduct.

== Early life and education ==
Jeffrey Johnson was born in Columbia, South Carolina. He attended Francis Bradley Elementary School and A.C. Flora High School, at which he was a member of a two-man debate team that won the South Carolina Debate Team Championship in 1977. He graduated as valedictorian (first honors) from A.C. Flora in 1978.

He attended Duke University on full scholarship as an Angier Biddle Duke Scholar and graduated in 1982 with honors. He double majored in political science and history, and studied Politics, Philosophy, and Economics at Oxford University in Oxford, England. He was president of his graduating class at Duke and received the President Terry Sanford Senior Leadership Award. He maintains close ties to his alma mater. He serves as an interviewer and advisor for the Duke University Office of Undergraduate Admissions.

Johnson earned his J.D. from Yale Law School in 1985. That same year, His paper on the law of satellite reconnaissance was awarded the Gherini Prize for the best analytical paper in the discipline of International Law. While at Yale, Justice Johnson was a member of the law school's Discipline Policy Committee.

== Legal career ==
After law school, Johnson worked as an associate with Manatt, Phelps & Phillips in Los Angeles from 1985 to 1989. He represented clients in diverse practice areas such as real estate, entertainment, corporate transactions, securities, banking, bankruptcy, and employment.

In 1989, Johnson was appointed as an Assistant United States Attorney in the United States Attorney's Office for the Central District of California. In 1994, Justice Johnson was elevated by appointment to Deputy Chief in the Narcotics Section of that office. From 1997 to 1999, he served on the U.S. Attorney's Capital Litigation Review Committee, a seven-member committee that reviewed death penalty eligible cases and made recommendations on whether to seek death penalty authorization from the Attorney General in specific cases.

During his ten years as a federal prosecutor, Justice Johnson received numerous awards and commendations for his work on behalf of the United States. Notable among them was the 1995 Attorney General's Award – the second highest award given by the United States Department of Justice. That award honored his wiretap investigation and prosecution of a nationwide crack cocaine and money-laundering network controlled by a notorious Los Angeles-based gang. Time Magazine covered the investigation in its February 27, 1995 issue.

In his tenure at the U.S. Attorney's Office, Justice Johnson was recognized nationally as an expert on the use and defense of court-authorized wiretaps in the course of federal criminal investigations and prosecutions. His article, "Defending Wiretaps: 'Think in the Beginning What the End Will Bring,'" was published in the September 1997 United States Attorneys' Bulletin. From 1994 to 1997, he was a faculty member of the Office of Legal Education in the U.S. Department of Justice, teaching "Evidence for Experienced Criminal Litigators."

== Judicial service ==
In April 1999, Johnson was appointed to the federal bench as a United States magistrate judge. He was reappointed to a second term in April 2007.

While on the federal bench, he served on several committees of the United States District Court for the Central District of California, including the Capital Cases Committee, the Rules Committee, the Criminal Justice Act Committee, and the Alternative Dispute Resolution Committee.

Justice Johnson was appointed by Governor Arnold Schwarzenegger on August 3, 2009, to the California Court of Appeal, Second District. Justice Johnson was retained in the 2010 election with 66.4% of the vote.

== Activities in the Legal Community ==
He is a member of the Court Facilities Advisory Committee ("CFAC"), appointed by Chief Justice Cantil-Sakauye in July 2011 to advise the Judicial Council of California on prioritization of courthouse construction projects throughout the state. Justice Johnson is a member of the executive committee of CFAC, and is chair of its Courthouse Cost Reduction Subcommittee, which facilitates cost savings in each of the judiciary's courthouse construction and renovation projects and manages implementation of mandated reductions on a day-to-day basis. Currently, the judicial branch of the State of California has $4.3 billion in active construction projects across the state. Another $1.2 billion in construction projects are currently pending. Justice Johnson also serves as a member of the Subcommittee on Courthouse Names, which establishes protocol and provides recommendations for the naming of courthouses statewide.

He is a director of the Western Justice Center Foundation, which works to educate citizens of all ages about, and to facilitate, nonviolent dispute resolution. He has also served terms on the board of the Federal Bar Association and is a lifetime member of the Langston Bar Association. Justice Johnson received the Mexican American Bar Association's Judicial Excellence Award in 2008. In July 2009, the Coalition of Mental Health Professionals, Inc. recognized Justice Johnson with The Justice Thurgood Marshall Award for Humanitarianism and Judicial Achievement.

Justice Johnson has served as a guest lecturer in trial advocacy at UCLA School of Law, University of Southern California Gould School of Law, Loyola Law School, and University of West Los Angeles School of Law. He has also taught Evidence as an adjunct professor of law at the University West Los Angeles School of Law.

== Allegations of sexual misconduct and removal from office ==
On January 14, 2019, Johnson was accused of sexual misconduct against several women, including fellow Court of Appeal justices Victoria Gerrard Chaney and Elizabeth A. Grimes, over a fifteen-year period. The Commission on Judicial Performance charged him with ten counts of misconduct. He denied all allegations. A hearing to determine any misconduct began August 5, 2019. On June 2, 2020, the Commission on Judicial Performance ordered his removal from the bench, finding him liable for 18 acts of prejudicial misconduct (based on 42 separate instances of proven misconduct) including unwanted touching, sexual comments, trying to initiate personal relationships with attorneys, and acting inappropriately while under the influence of alcohol. This decision was appealable at that time to the California Supreme Court. On January 27, 2021, the California Supreme Court rejected hearing his appeal — effectively upholding the commission's decision to remove Justice Johnson from the bench.
