= John Grymes =

John Grymes may refer to:

- John Randolph Grymes, New Orleans attorney and member of the Louisiana state legislature
- John Grymes (burgess), Virginia planter and politician

== See also ==
- John Grimes (disambiguation)
