= Grimnes =

Grimnes is a surname. Notable people with the surname include:

- Bjørn Grimnes (born 1950), Norwegian javelin thrower
- Ole Kristian Grimnes (born 1937), Norwegian historian

== See also ==
- Grimes (surname)
