= Michael Grimes =

Michael Grimes may refer to:

- Michael Grimes (investment banker) (born 1966), American technologist and banker
- Michael Grimes (scientist) (1888–1977), Irish professor of microbiology
