= William Grimes =

William Grimes may refer to:

- William Alvan Grimes (1911–1999), Chief Justice of the New Hampshire Supreme Court
- William C. Grimes (Oklahoma politician) (1857–1931), American politician and businessman
- William C. Grimes (Florida politician) (1918–2007), member of the Florida House of Representatives
- William Grimes (journalist) (born 1959), former restaurant critic and current obituary writer for The New York Times
- W. F. Grimes (1905–1988), Welsh archaeologist
- William Grimes (footballer) (1886–?), English professional footballer for Bradford City and Derby County
- William Grimes (former slave) (1784–1865), author of what is considered the first narrative of an American ex-slave, Life of William Grimes, the Runaway Slave
- William P. Grimes (1868–1939), American politician in Wisconsin
- Billy Grimes (1927–2005), American football player

== See also ==
- Willie Grimes (disambiguation)
