= A.C. Flora High School =

Public high school in Colombia, South Carolina, United States

A. C. Flora High School
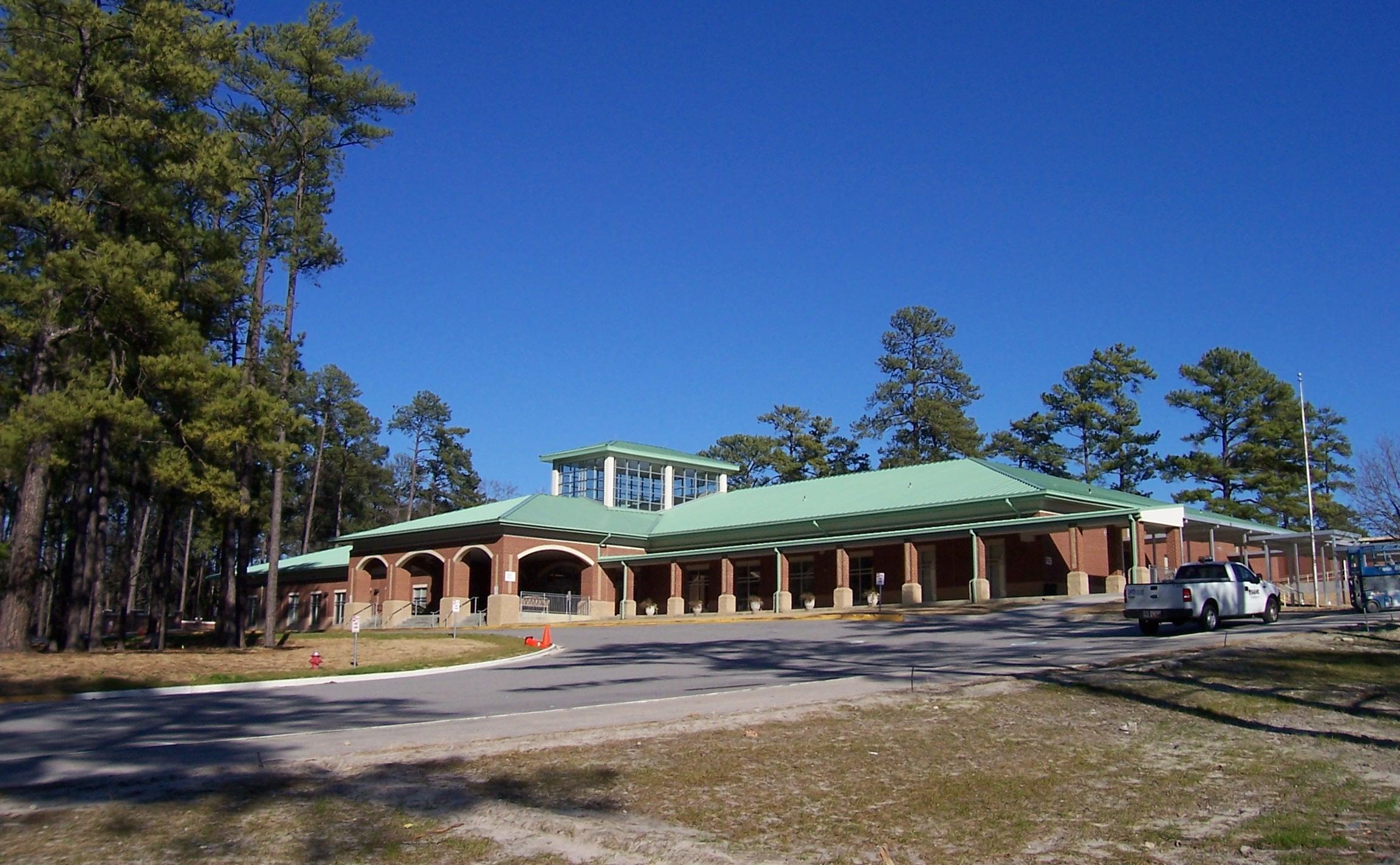

Location
- 1 Falcon Drive; Columbia, South Carolina 29204; United States; 34°1′2″N 80°58′58″W

Information
- Type: Public
- Established: 1959 (67 years ago)
- Principal: Susan Childs
- Teaching staff: 81.75 (FTE)
- Enrollment: 1,334 (2023-2024)
- Student to teacher ratio: 16.32
- Schedule type: Block Scheduling
- Hours in school day: 8:00 am – 3:15 pm
- Colors: Scarlet and Columbia blue
- Athletics: AAAA
- Mascot: Falcon
- Rival: Dreher High School
- Website: flora.richlandone.org

A. C. Flora High School is a public high school located in the City of Forest Acres, South Carolina, a suburb of Columbia. The school is one of seven high schools operated by Richland County School District One. The school was founded in 1959 to ease overcrowding and accommodate growth in the Forest Acres area, and the school was named for Abram Cline Flora, an accomplished educator who served as the district's superintendent.

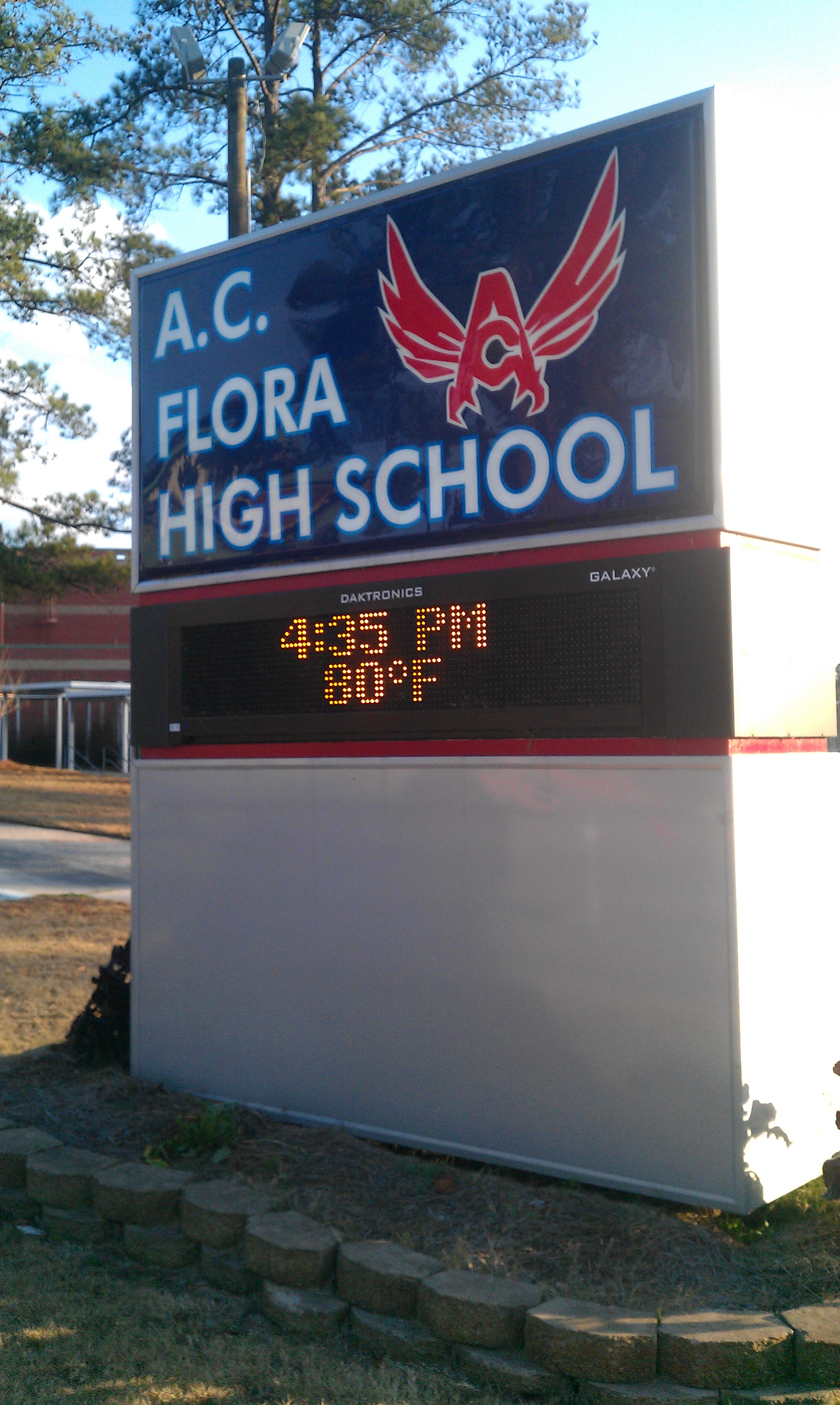
Entrance sign

== Golf ==
The A.C. Flora boys' golf team has won seven 3A state championships since 2001. Coach Harry Huntley, who holds the Richland Country District record for most state championship wins (eight), has coached 14 golfers who have gone off to play for college.

== Baseball ==
The A.C. Flora baseball team has multiple state championship and Upper State Championship wins in the past 10 years, and won the 2012 South Carolina 3A State Championship. They were ranked top 70 in the nation by MaxPreps at the end of the 2012 season. They won the 2013 International Paper Classic, a tournament held in Georgetown, SC. The A.C. Flora Baseball team has produced college players for the University of South Carolina, Clemson University, University of North Carolina, University of Tennessee, College of Charleston, University of South Carolina at Sumter, and many other schools. The Falcons won the 2014 International Paper Classic for the second year in a row and are currently ranked second nationally by Collegiate Baseball.

== Basketball ==
The A.C. Flora basketball team is coached by Edward Scott since March 2022. Prior to that the head coach was Joshua Staley, cousin of the University of South Carolina Women's basketball head coach Dawn Staley. During the 2012–13 season, they won the Region IV-AAA Championship and made it to the Upper State semifinals. In 2014, the Boys' Varsity team won its fourth State title with a 51-42 OT win against Darlington High School. In the summer of 2014, Leon Brunson stepped down as Head Coach and A.C. Flora hired Staley as head coach. The following season, Staley led the Falcons to a second straight State Championship appearance, where they would lose to the Midland Valley Mustangs 62–56. In the 2015–2016 season, Staley would lead the Falcons again to its third straight State Championship, where they defeated defending champion Midland Valley 60–50. This would become A.C. Flora's second championship in 3 years and 5th overall for the school. As of February 2015, MaxPreps ranked A.C. Flora 3rd in the State of South Carolina. Legendary coach Carl Williams led A.C. Flora's juggernaut boys' basketball program in the 1980s, producing state champion teams in 1981 and 1986 and a state runner-up finish in 1985.

== Math team ==
Under the coaching of Patrick Rybarczyk, the team has received honors at The USC Math Contest, the Furman Wylie Math Tournament, the Carolina Panthers Numbers Crunch, the Clemson Calculus Challenge, the College of Charleston Math Meet, and made up one third of the South Carolina ARML team, which won the Division B team award at Penn State and won the Site award at the UGA site.

== Notable alumni ==
- Lee Atwater, Republican political consultant
- Joseph Charlton, former punter at South Carolina and currently is an NFL Free Agent
- Tyrone Corbin, professional basketball player and coach
- Kristin Davis, actress, Sex and the City
- Percival Everett, writer and professor at University of Southern California
- Kambrell Garvin, South Carolina State Representative, District 77
- Celestin Haba, defensive end for the Winnipeg Blue Bombers in the CFL
- Jeffrey W. Johnson, Associate Justice of the California Court of Appeal
- Xavier McDaniel, former professional basketball player
- Allison Munn, actress
- Collin Murray-Boyles, basketball player
- Steven Salzberg, scientist and professor at Johns Hopkins University
- Sadie Stanley, actress
- ND Stevenson, cartoonist
- Charles Warren, professional golfer
