= Edward Grimes =

Edward Grimes may refer to:

- Edward Grimes (politician) (c.1811–1859), Auditor-General and member of the Victorian Legislative Council
- Edward Grimes (singer) (born 1991), one of the Irish singing twins known professionally as Jedward
