= Paul Grimes =

Paul Grimes may refer to:

- Paul Grimes (criminal) (born 1950), English former gangster
- Paul Grimes (public servant), Australian public servant
