= John Hollison =

American baseball player (1870–1969)

- Pitcher
- Born: May 3, 1870; Chicago, Illinois, U.S.
- Died: August 19, 1969 (aged 99); Chicago, Illinois, U.S.
- Batted: Right Threw: Left

MLB debut
- August 13, 1892, for the Chicago Colts

Last MLB appearance
- August 13, 1892, for the Chicago Colts

MLB statistics
- Win–loss record: 0-0
- Earned run average: 2.25
- Strikeouts: 2
- Stats at Baseball Reference

Teams
- Chicago Colts (1892)

John Henry Hollison (May 3, 1870 – August 19, 1969) was an American professional baseball player who was a pitcher in Major League Baseball in 1892. He played in one game for the Chicago Colts. At the time of his death, he was the oldest living former major league player.

== Biography ==
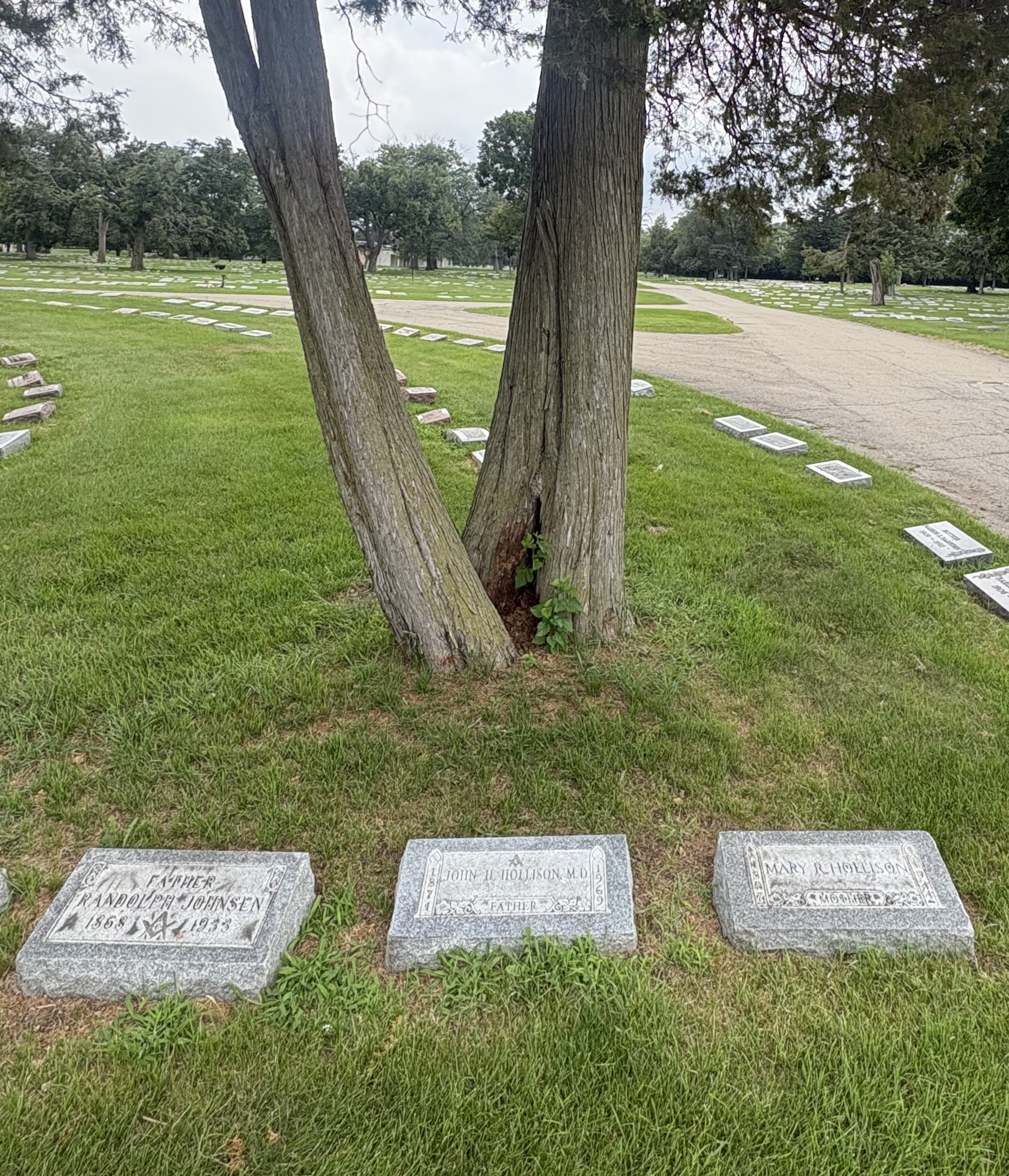
Hollison's grave (center) at Acacia Park Cemetery

After baseball, Hollison became a physician. He died on August 19, 1969, and was buried at Acacia Park Cemetery in Norwood Park Township, Illinois.

Records
Preceded by John Grimes	Oldest recognized verified living baseball player January 17, 1964 – August 19, 1969	Succeeded by Ralph Miller
