= David Grimes =

David Grimes may refer to:

- David Grimes (American football) (born 1986), American football wide receiver
- David Grimes (composer) (born 1948), American composer
- David Grimes (physician) (born 1947), American physician and abortion provider
- David Robert Grimes (born 1985), physicist and cancer researcher at the University of Oxford
- David Grimes (meteorologist), Canadian meteorologist
- David Grimes (politician), Alabama state legislator
