= Kevin Grimes =

Kevin Grimes may refer to:

- Kevin Grimes (ice hockey) (born 1979), Canadian ice hockey player
- Kevin Grimes (soccer) (born 1967), U.S. soccer defender
