= James Grimes =

James Grimes may refer to:

- James W. Grimes (1816–1872), American statesman
- James Grimes (soccer) (born 1968), Canadian striker
- James Walter Grimes (born 1953), American botanist
- James Grimes, involved in the St Kilda Road robberies

== See also ==
- James Grime, contributor to Numberphile, a mathematics YouTube channel
