= Thomas Grimes (disambiguation) =

Thomas Grimes was an English politician.

Thomas Grimes may also refer to:

- Thomas W. Grimes (1844–1905), American politician
- Tom Grimes, American novelist, playwright and creative writing instructor
