= Charles Grimes =

Charles Grimes may refer to:

- Charles Grimes (surveyor) (1772–1858), English surveyor in colonial Australia
- Charles Grimes (rower) (1935–2007), American rower
