= John Grimes =

John Grimes may refer to:

- John Grimes (bishop of Christchurch) (1842–1915), first Roman Catholic bishop of Christchurch, New Zealand
- John Grimes (bishop of Syracuse) (1852–1922), Roman Catholic bishop
- John Bryan Grimes (1868–1923), North Carolina Democratic politician and farmer
- John Grimes (baseball) (1869–1964), American baseball player
- John Grimes (priest) (1881–1976), Anglican Archdeacon of Northampton
- John Grimes, former U.S. Assistant Secretary of Defense for Networks and Information Integration (2005-2009)
- John Grimes (singer) (born 1991), member of the Irish pop rap duo Jedward
- John Grimes, fictional character in a series of novels by A. Bertram Chandler
- John Grimes, fictional character in the film Black Hawk Down
- Dr. John Grimes (1802–1875), Quaker anti-slavery advocate and namesake of the Grimes Homestead

== See also ==
- Jack Grimes (disambiguation)
