= George Grimes =

George Grimes may refer to:

- George Grimes (American football) (1922–1971), NFL football player for the Detroit Lions
- George Grimes (English politician) (1605–1657), member of parliament and Royalist
- George Grimes (Queensland politician) (1835–1910), member of the Queensland Legislative Assembly
- George F. Grimes (1877–1929), businessman and political figure in Newfoundland
