= Stephen Grimes =

Stephen Grimes may refer to:

- Stephen B. Grimes (1927–1988), English production designer and art director
- Stephen H. Grimes (1927–2021), American lawyer and jurist
