= Rachel Grimes =

Rachel Grimes MBE
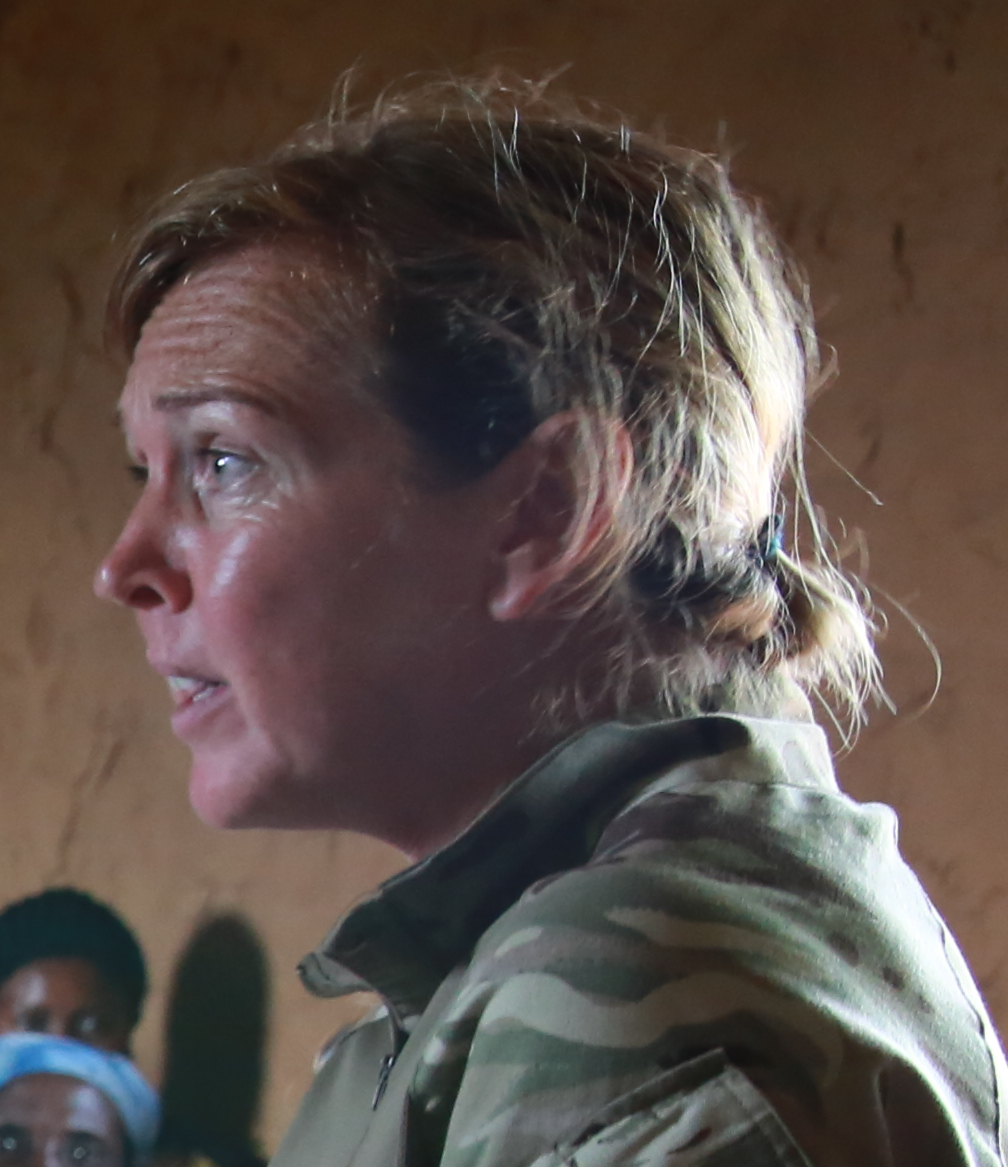
- Rachel Grimes in 2014
- Born: United Kingdom
- Occupation: Army
- Years active: 1993–2020
- Known for: Gender Advisor for the Office of Military Affairs, UN Headquarters New York Gender and Child Protection Advisor for the military contingent in the UN mission in DRC Deputy Chair of the NATO Committee on Gender Perspectives Protection of Civilians Adviser, Iraq Designing and delivering courses on women, peace and security and human security
- Notable work: Woman's role in the British Army's Counter-insurgency operations Military Masculinity in COIN Teaching Gender to the Military (DCAF publication) Interviews with the BBC, UK Times and The Economist Drafting the Joint Service Publication 1325 on Human Security in Military Operations

Rachel Grimes MBE is a retired officer of the British Armed Forces. She worked for almost three decades in the security sector. Grimes has deployed on operations with NATO, the United Nations and as a part of a UK national contingent in war and conflict areas in Europe, Asia and Africa. She has worked in security sector reform, counterinsurgency operations and human security in military operations. Initially working in transport, logistics and air defence missile systems. Grimes went on to be the Army's spokesperson in the MOD and deployed as a media operations officer in Iraq in 2003. She has also worked in the area of influence operations and as a doctrine and policy writer. Grimes was part of the NATO Counterinsurgency Writing Group from 2011 to 2013. She worked in the Democratic Republic of Congo with the United Nations Organization Stabilization Mission in the Democratic Republic of the Congo's (MONUSCO's) as the UN Force Commander's Child Protection and Gender Field Advisor in Goma. She deployed to a similar role in Iraq in 2015 and then spent three years at the United Nations HQ in New York acting as a Gender and Child Protection Adviser to the UN Military Adviser. She is keenly aware of the gender dynamics at play in conflict and in peace and has studied the role and contribution of women and military masculinities in Counter Insurgency Operations and the British Army.

During the 2016 Queen's birthday honours, on 11 June 2016 she was made a Member of the Order of the British Empire in the Military Division.

== Biography ==
Grimes, from the United Kingdom, studied at the Bristol University and received Master of Science (MSC) degree in International Relations and Gender, in 2012. She has almost 30 years of service with the British Armed forces and worked with the Foreign and Commonwealth Office on several occasions including in repatriating UK citizens during the Icelandic volcanic eruption and during the planning for the Preventing Sexual Violence Initiative. She has represented the UK in various roles from Mongolia to Uruguay, as well as diplomatic engagements Grimes has served in Northern Ireland, Bosnia, Iraq and Afghanistan where she served twice with NATO in the International Security Assistance Force mission. Here she saw the utility of Female Engagement Teams and the challenges the women faced who made up the "FETs". During 2014, she initially worked with the United Nations as an Intelligence Planning Officer in the Democratic Republic of Congo and later in the role of the UN Force Commander's Child Protection and Gender Field Adviser. Following this experience, in May 2015 in a special training workshop for the female military officers (32 officers from 24 countries attended) conducted by UN Women, in association with the Centre for United Nations Peacekeeping (CUNPK) in India she gave a lecture stating: "As militaries are male-dominated and the majority of the leadership is male-dominated... a young woman thinking of this career may be put off because there doesn’t seem to be an infrastructure in place to support her". She went on to explain the progress that had been made but noted that there is till work to be done.

Grimes also gave a seminar explaining the difficulties of responding to incidents of conflict related sexual violence in the Democratic Republic of Congo and the experience she gained from "mainstreaming gender across the United Nations Organization Stabilization Mission in the Democratic Republic of the Congo's (MONUSCO's) mandate". This mandate was part of the "international policy framework of UN Security Council Resolution 1325 on Women, Peace and Security". Her approach also represented the United Kingdom's binding adherence to enhance its presence internationally to prevent sexual violence in conflict and wider issues relating to gender dynamics; this policy is integral to the United Kingdom's "National Action Plan on Women, Peace & Security and the Preventing Sexual Violence Initiative" (PSVI).

During the International Women’s Day celebrations held in March 2016, Grimes was conducting a training programme to the Kurdish security forces in northern Iraq, with a view to facilitate rendering better assistance to civilians affected by sexual violence at the hands of the Islamic State of Iraq and the Levant (Daesh).

== Bibliography ==
- Ardener, Shirley; Armitage-Woodward, Fiona; Sciama, Lidia D. (28 February 2016). War and Women Across Continents: Autobiographical and Biographical Experiences. Berghahn Books. ISBN 978-1-78533-013-1.
