= Frank Conroy (author) =

American author (1936–2005)

- Conroy, c. 1960
- Born: January 15, 1936; New York City, U.S.
- Died: April 6, 2005 (aged 69); Iowa City, Iowa, U.S.
- Education: Haverford College
- Writing career
- Language: English
- Genres: Memoir, novel, short story, essay, travelogue
- Notable work: Stop-Time

Frank Conroy (January 15, 1936 – April 6, 2005) was an American author. He published five books, including the highly acclaimed memoir Stop-Time. Published in 1967, this ultimately made Conroy a noted figure in the literary world. The book was nominated for the National Book Award.

== Early life and education ==
Frank Conroy was born on January 15, 1936, in New York, New York, to an American father and a Danish mother. Conroy graduated from Haverford College, and was director of the influential Iowa Writers' Workshop at the University of Iowa for 18 years, from 1987 until 2005, where he was also F. Wendell Miller Professor. He was previously the director of the literature program at the National Endowment for the Arts from 1982 to 1987.

== Writing ==
Conroy's published works include the memoir Stop-Time (1967); a collection of short stories, Midair (1985); a novel, Body and Soul (1993), which is regarded as one of the finest evocations of the experience of being a musician; a collection of essays and commentaries, Dogs Bark, but the Caravan Rolls On: Observations Then and Now (2002); and a travelogue, Time and Tide: A Walk Through Nantucket (2004). His fiction and nonfiction appeared in such journals as The New Yorker, Esquire, GQ, Harper's Magazine, Glamour, Parenting, and Partisan Review. He was named a Knight of the Order of Arts and Letters by the French government.

== Jazz piano ==
In addition to writing, Conroy was an accomplished jazz pianist, winning a Grammy Award in 1986 for liner notes. His book Dogs Bark, But the Caravan Rolls On: Observations Then and Now includes articles that describe jamming with Charles Mingus and with Charlie Watts and Bill Wyman. The latter session occurred when Conroy was writing about the Rolling Stones for Esquire. Conroy had arrived at a mansion for the interview, found nobody there, and eventually sat down at a grand piano and began to play. Someone wandered in, sat down at the drums, and joined in with accomplished jazz drumming; then a fine jazz bassist joined in. They turned out to be Watts and Wyman, whom Conroy did not recognize until they introduced themselves after the session.

== Death and recognition ==
Conroy died of colon cancer on April 6, 2005, in Iowa City, Iowa, at the age of 69. The Frank Conroy Reading Room in the Dey House, the home of the Iowa Writers' Workshop, was named in his honor.

Conroy is the subject of Mentor: A Memoir by Tom Grimes, his former student at the Iowa Writers Workshop and longtime friend.
