= Louise Grimes =

Australian musician and teacher (1907–1990)

Louise Grimes ATCL LTCL L.Mus.T.C.L. FTCL
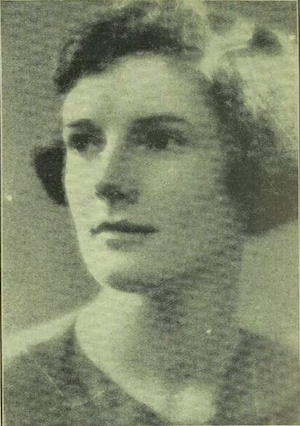
- Louise Grimes in 1937
- Born: 6 September 1907; Lutwyche, Brisban
- Died: 5 September 1990 (aged 82); Chermside, Brisbane
- Education: Windsor State School; Brisbane Girls Grammar School; University of Adelaide (B.A.); Queensland University
- Occupations: Organist; teacher; broadcaster; lecturer

Louise Catherine Grimes ATCL LTCL L.Mus.T.C.L. FTCL was an Australian musician, teacher, organist, and choir mistress. She was a prominent figure in the Brisbane music community and was notable for being the first woman organist at St John's Cathedral.

== Early life and education ==
Grimes was born in Lutwyche, Queensland, in 1907 to Lilian Grimes and Alfred Kingsford Grimes. She attended Windsor State and Brisbane Girls Grammar School and received her early musical education from Ethel Martin. Grimes was also a student with organist George Sampson for 12 years, from whom she received her choral and organ training.

In 1930, Grimes became the first woman in Queensland to pass the Licentiate in Music Examination of Trinity College London and qualified as a Fellow. In 1937, she became the first woman in Queensland to graduate with a Bachelor of Music degree from the University of Adelaide. She achieved a distinction and was one of only two people to hold this degree in Queensland at the time. It was reported that along with university and examination fees, Grimes had to pay for outside tuition and achieved her degree without being provided with lectures from the university.

In addition to her Music degree, Grimes began an arts course at Queensland University in 1937.

== Broadcast and teaching ==
Grimes was appointed to a Department of Public Instruction committee in 1924 to work with radio station 4QG to supervise educational broadcasting. She broadcast these educational shows from 1938 to 1952. Through the late 1920s and the 1930s, she regularly performed two-piano recitals with Helen Collins for the Australian Broadcasting Corporation.

In the 1930s, Grimes taught at Windsor State School where she was music mistress with a particular focus on the child voice. She directed the musical education of more than 1,100 children including junior and senior girls' choirs and boys' choir of 100 voices each, and an orchestra of 25 violinists. She stated that she did not want to take the children into the public eye too frequently, believing that was better for the children's characters.

Grimes was also conductor of Brisbane Girls Grammar School Old Girls' Association choir. In 1936 she conducted a performance of Samuel Coleridge-Taylor's Hiawatha music in Albert Hall, Brisbane, and employed members of the Brisbane Grammar School Old Girls' Association and members of the Windsor Choir.

Grimes gave a number of Brisbane premiere performances with her choirs. In 1937, she conducted a performance of Benjamin Britten's Saint Nicolas cantata St John's Cathedral with boy's choir, which was the first performance of the work in Brisbane. She also gave the first performance of Britten's Noye's Fludde in the city.

From 1941 to 1947, Grimes was appointed to the Windsor State School's music department, overseeing the musical education in Queensland. In 1957, she became a lecturer at Queensland Teachers' College. She moved to Kedron Park Teachers' College in 1960, where she established the music department and became dean of women.

== Organist ==
Grimes was appointed organist and choir mistress of St John's Cathedral in 1947 after supervising the cathedral for 12 months. She was the first woman to be appointed to the cathedral. All the other 19 other applicants for the position were men. It was reported that at the time, Grimes was the only woman organist of a major cathedral in the British Empire. After being appointed organist at St. John's, she resigned from her position of choir mistress of St. Alban's Church.

At St John's, Grimes reformed the music library, unearthing previously unsung Tudor choral music and promoting the singing of twentieth century repertoire. She conducted carol services at St John's every year beginning on the first Friday in December in 1947. The services became a key part of the Brisbane Christmas season.

Grimes often gave recitals and performed in concerts as an organist. She gave a recital at St Andrew's Cathedral, Sydney, in September 1956 as part of a larger programme of concerts, including the St Matthew Passion, and also played organ in an all-women concert in 1945 for the reception of the Duchess of Gloucester held by the National Council of Women.

Grimes retired as an organist in 1960 and retired completely in 1973. Once retired, she moved to Jimboomba and took up part-time farming as a hobby.
