= Jack Grimes =

Jack Grimes may refer to:

- Jack Grimes (actor) (1926–2009), American actor
- Jack Grimes (footballer) (born 1989), Australian rules footballer

== See also ==
- John Grimes (disambiguation)
