= Willie Grimes =

Willie Grimes may refer to:

- Willie Grimes, student killed during the 1969 Greensboro uprising
- Willie Grimes, a character in I Sell the Dead
- Willie Grimes, a character in Squirm

== See also ==
- William Grimes (disambiguation)
