= Christopher M. Grimes =

Bermudian painter

Christopher Martin Grimes (born 1948) is an artist residing in Bermuda, working primarily in oils, and also in watercolors.

Grimes painted many oil portraits in Bermuda, including the official portrait of the Bishop of Bermuda on his retirement.

His paintings to commemorate the 400th anniversary of the settlement of Bermuda were used in 2009 to illustrate publications on the anniversary, including the cover of the Bermudian Magazine of May 2009, and a documentary produced by Look TV in Bermuda.

His work was used to illustrate a number of books, calendars, and Christmas cards.
