= William C. Grimes (Florida politician) =

American politician

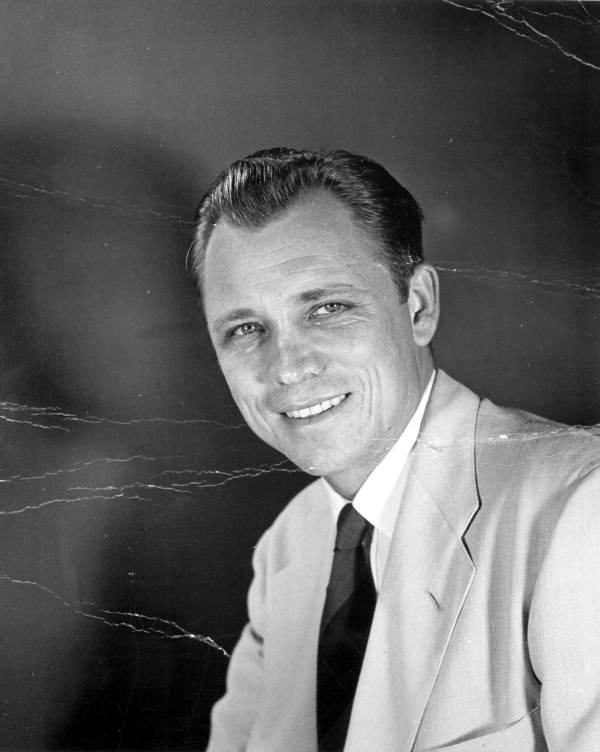
- Grimes in 1955

Member of the Florida House of Representatives from Manatee County
- In office 1954–1958

Personal details
- Born: October 18, 1918 Chicago, Illinois, U.S.
- Died: February 13, 2007 (aged 88)
- Party: Democratic
- Spouse: Janet
- Children: 2
- Education: University of Florida

William C. Grimes (October 18, 1918 – February 13, 2007) was an American politician. He served as a Democratic member of the Florida House of Representatives.

== Life and career ==
Grimes was born in Chicago, Illinois. He attended the University of Florida.

Grimes served in the Florida House of Representatives from 1954 to 1958.

Grimes died on February 13, 2007, at the age of 88.
