= Anne Grimes =

Journalist, musician and historian of American folklore (1912 - 2004)

- Born: Anne Laylin; May 17, 1912; Columbus, Ohio
- Died: January 14, 2004 (aged 91); Oberlin, Ohio
- Education: Ohio Wesleyan University
- Occupation(s): journalist, historian, and folklorist
- Years active: 1942–1997
- Known for: Collecting Ohio folklore and dulcimer collection
- Notable work: Album: Ohio State Ballads: History Through Folk Songs: Anne Grimes with Dulcimer; Book: Stories from the Anne Grimes Collection of American Folk Music Completed and published by her daughters, posthumously
- Awards: Distinguished Career in Music Award from Ohio State University School of Music, 1993

Anne Grimes (May 17, 1912 – January 14, 2004) was an American journalist, musician and historian of American (specifically Midwestern) folklore. An Ohio folksinger, she collected and performed traditional songs now preserved in the Anne Grimes Collection in the American Folklife Center of the Library of Congress. She also collected vintage dulcimers and other instruments now housed in the Smithsonian's National Museum of American History in Washington, D.C., in 1997. Grimes was a classically trained vocalist and accomplished pianist among other musical pursuits.

== Early life ==
Anne Grimes was born May 17, 1912, in Columbus, Ohio. Her father, Clarence D. Laylin was an active Columbus corporate lawyer and law professor at Ohio State University. His father, Lewis Cass Laylin, was assistant secretary of the interior under presidents William Howard Taft and Woodrow Wilson, as well as Ohio Secretary of State and Speaker of the Legislature. Her mother, served as a trustee of Ohio Wesleyan University. Throughout her career as a folklorist, Grimes used the connections of her parents and grandparents to access opportunities for meetings, research, and performances.

She attended North High School and Ohio Wesleyan University in Delaware, Ohio. Grimes received and Bachelor of Arts and a Bachelor of music degree from Ohio Wesleyan. At Ohio State University, she began graduate work in music history and theory with a specialization in piano and voice although she did not complete her studies.

Grimes was married to Dr. James W. Grimes, a professor of art at Ohio State University, Columbus; he took over as chairman of the Denison University Art Department in 1962. He designed the costumes Grimes wore for presentations based on the outfits of Ohio pioneer women as well as assist with recording. Together they had five children, Stephen, Sara, Jennifer, Mary, and Mindy.

== Career ==
Upon completion of her education, Grimes worked as a music instructor in Delaware County Schools and the Columbus Academy. Between 1942 and 1946 Grimes worked as a critic for the Columbus Citizen covering music and dance performances; during this time she also hosted a weekly radio program on WOSU radio. At the end of World War II, Grimes began traveling across Ohio, collecting and preserving folk songs. During her collection trips, she would tape record, research and learn the songs collected; often with assistance from her husband. During the 1950s, she emerged as an expert on the dulcimer, specifically the Appalachian dulcimer, and in 1957 she released an album, Ohio State Ballads: History Through Folk Songs: Anne Grimes with Dulcimer with Folkways Records. The Smithsonian re-released the album in 1991. Grimes' contributors (her term for informants) were from many backgrounds, but her collection also contained items from Carl Sandburg, Pete Seeger, Jenny Wells Vincent, and Bob Gibson. From the 1950s onwards, Grimes often put on programs where she would lecture on, and perform items, found within her collection.

From 1961 until 1993, Anne Grimes served as a judge for the national competition, Dulcimer Days, in Roscoe, Ohio. In 1971, Grimes performed at Ohio Governor John Gilligan's inaugural gala at the Ohio Theater in Columbus. In 1997, Grimes donated her rare folk instrument collection to the Smithsonian Institution. To mark the occasion, she performed with her friend and fellow folklorist, Joe Hickerson at the National Museum of American History in Washington, D.C.

Grimes died at 91, in January 2004 at her residence in Oberlin, Ohio. At the time of her death in 2004, Grimes was working on a book about her recordings and the stories of the individuals from whom she collected. Her daughters—Sara Grimes, Jennifer Grimes Kay, Mary Grimes, and Mindy Grimes compiled and edited her book, Stories from the Anne Grimes Collection of American Folk Music, that was published in 2010 by the Ohio University Press. The book included a CD with 33 recordings from the Anne Grimes Collection in the American Folklife Center of the Library of Congress.

== Memberships and legacy ==
=== Memberships ===
- President and editor of the Ohio Folklore Society
- Advisory Board member of the National Folk Festival
- Archivist of the National Federation of Music Clubs
- Honorary Life Membership in the Ohio Historical Society
- Honorary Life Membership in Delta Kappa Gamma
- Honorary Life Membership in the Ohio Folklore Society

=== Awards ===
- Distinguished Career in Music Award from Ohio State University School of Music, 1993
- Alumni Awards Distinguished Achievement Citation from Ohio Wesleyan University, 1994

=== Albums, publications, collection ===
- Album: Ohio State Ballads History Through Folksongs Anne Grimes, with Dulcimer Edited by Kenneth S. Goldstein. Released in 1957 on Folkways Records, re-issued, 1991 by the Smithsonian
- Book: Stories from the Anne Grimes Collection of American Folk Music. Published by Ohio University Press, 2010.
- The Anne Grimes Collection of Ohio Folk Music is preserved in the Library of Congress and includes recordings, photographs, articles, manuscripts, and publications. Some of her recording collection is also housed with the Ohio Historical Society.
