= Regan Grimes =

Canadian bodybuilder (born 1993)

- ♂ Professional bodybuilder
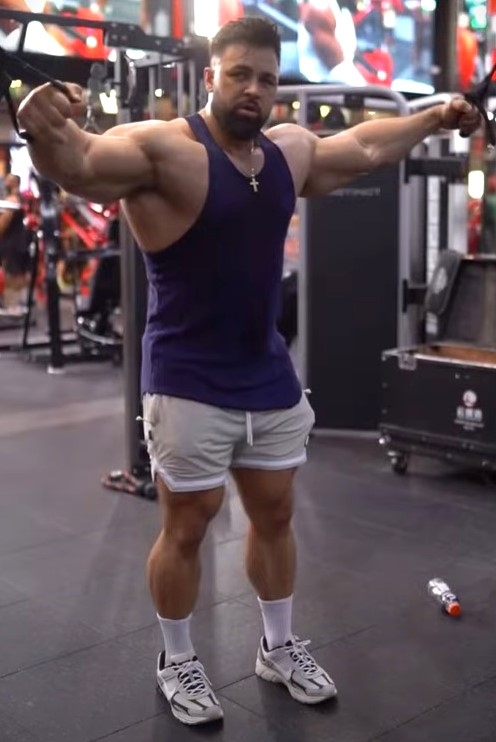
- Grimes performing a cable chest fly in 2024

Personal info
- Born: June 26, 1993 (age 33); Lindsay, Ontario, Canada

Best statistics
- Height: 6 ft 0 in (183 cm)
- Weight: 213–260 lb (97–118 kg) (contest); 263–305 lb (119–138 kg) (off-season)

Professional (Pro) career
- Active: 2010–present

Regan Grimes (born June 26, 1993) is a French-Canadian bodybuilder and IFBB Pro.

== Biography ==
Grimes began weightlifting at the age of 17 in 2011, and made his debut a year later UFE, participating in the middleweight division, placing 1st. He competed in the 2018 New York Pro under the International Federation of Bodybuilding (IFBB), placing first. Switching over to the Open division from Classic Physique, in 2020, he competed in the IFBB's Romania Muscle Fest Pro, again placing first. In 2022, he won the Cairo Pro competition and qualified for the 2022 Mr. Olympia, but dropped out prior to the competition. He competed in the 2023 Mr. Olympia competition in Orlando, FL.

Grimes is currently coached by 1989 Mr. Universe winner Miloš Šarčev, and recently began training with seven-time Mr. Olympia winner Phil Heath. He owns his own clothing line and gym.

=== Placing history ===
Regan Grimes Placing History
Year	Competition	Rank
2012	Ultimate Fitness Events: Middleweight	1
2017	Vancouver Pro	2
2018	New York Pro	1
2018 Mr. Olympia: Classic		8
2019	Japan Pro	3
2020	British Grand Prix Pro	2
2020	Romania Muscle Fest Pro	1
2021 Mr. Olympia		15
2021	Legion Sports Fest	2
2022	Cairo Pro	1
2022	Arnold Classic	7
2022	Boston Pro	7
2023	Flex Pro	2
2023	Europa Pro	1
2023 Mr. Olympia		9
2025	California State Pro	1
2025	Toronto Pro	2
2025 Mr. Olympia		14
2025	Mexico Pro	2
2026	Lenda Murray Atlanta Pro	2
2026	Texas Pro	2
2026	Austrian Oak Pro	1
2026 Mr. Olympia		7
