= Tom Grimes =

American writer

Tom Grimes is an American novelist, playwright, and creative writing instructor. He currently teaches in the MFA Program in Creative Writing at Texas State University in San Marcos, and served as the program's director from 1996 to 2015.

Grimes was a promising student at the Iowa Writers' Workshop while it was under the direction of Frank Conroy, author of the memoir Stop-Time. Grimes’ own memoir, Mentor: A Memoir (Tin House), is largely concerned with his time in Iowa and his friendship with Conroy, whom Grimes first met while writing and working as a waiter in Key West. Grimes has described Mentor as the autobiography of a “failed novelist.” Grimes’ chronicle of failing to realize high expectations of him as a writer has arguably proven to be his greatest literary success thus far. This book was well received with one mentioning 'couldn't put "Mentor" down' in his review.

After Iowa, Grimes was recruited to head the MFA program at Texas State (known as Southwest Texas State University at the time). Grimes’ stewardshipelevated the program to national prominence, and has attracted visiting writers and faculty such as Tim O’Brien, ZZ Packer, Robert Stone, Dagoberto Gilb, and Debra Monroe. Texas State's MFA program broke into the Top Fifty in Poets & Writers' rankings of graduate writing programs for the application year 2012.

Grimes was also instrumental in organizing and raising funds for the restoration of the historic Katherine Anne Porter House in Kyle, Texas (the childhood home of Pulitzer Prize–winning author Katherine Anne Porter), as well as the development of the KAP Literary Center, which is affiliated with the writing program at Texas State. The Katherine Anne Porter House has since hosted workshops, craft talks, and public readings by writers and poets such as Robert Creeley, Percival Everett, Richard Ford, Mary Gaitskill, Annie Proulx, and George Saunders.

== Bibliography ==
- Mentor: A Memoir
- Redemption Song
- Will@epicqwest.com
- City of God
- Season's End
- A Stone of the Heart
- The Workshop: Seven Decades of the Iowa Writers' Workshop (Editor)
