= Brittney Grimes =

American poet

Brittney Grimes is a poet, published author, writer, model, and motivational speaker.

Her first book, Poetry For A Child By A Child, was followed by The Poetry For A Child By A Child Workbook, Ice Cream Dreams, and The True Glory of the Christmas Story.

She has spoken on CNN Person of the Day, ABC 7, NBC, Good Morning America, UPN and Nickelodeon Nick News.

Her work has been in Ebony magazine, The New York Times, Scholastic magazine, Newsday and other publications.

She has modeled for runway and commercial print, including a national JBS Hair Ad, and Vibe Vixen of the Day. In 2017, she was featured on the cover of Validate Magazine.

As a writer, Brittney has received numerous awards, including the National Organization for Women (NOW) "Young Achiever's Award", the National Council of Negro Women (NCNW) Award for Achievement, the Zora Neale Hurston Literary Award given by Zeta Phi Beta, and the Dr. Martin Luther King, Jr. Humanitarian Award. In 2005, Brittney's name was placed on the Wall of Tolerance in Montgomery, Alabama, in honor of Rosa Parks' National Campaign for Tolerance.

In 2007, she was awarded the President's Volunteer Service Award from the President's Council on Service and Civic Participation. She received the Silver Award and a letter from President George Bush.

In 1998, Brittney recited her poem "Children of the World" on It's Showtime at the Apollo at the Apollo Theater in Harlem NY, on Amateur Night, and came in first place. In 2002, she spoke at the McDonald's Gospelfest, an annual gospel music and talent festival. She recited a poem she wrote and won first place in the first ever Gospel Poetry Category contest. In 2015, Brittney was a national recipient of a handcrafted plaque from the Wells Fargo Bank "Untold Stories Collection" for her poetry. In 2023, she was awarded the New York State Women of Distinction proclamation for her writing.

In October 2006, Brittney was featured in Ebony magazine in an article titled "Terrific Teens". In 2007, she was the Grand Prize winner of Seventeen magazine and Avon Makeup's national "Avon Make your Mark" Contest, which honored a young woman who is making her mark through volunteering in her community. She is featured in the October 2013 issue of Long Island Woman. Her next book is coming out in Spring 2014. She is also a writer for The Huffington Post blog.
