= Edward Grimes (politician) =

Australian politician

Edward Grimes (c. 1811 – 2 June 1859) was a pastoralist, Auditor-General of Victoria (Australia) and a member of the Victorian Legislative Council.

In 1844 Grimes was appointed a magistrate for the Port Phillip District; in 1851 he was clerk of the Victorian Executive Council.

On 8 December 1853, Grimes was appointed Auditor-General and a member of the original (unicameral) Victorian Legislative Council. Hugh Childers succeeded Grimes as Auditor-General by November 1855.

Grimes died in London, England, on 2 June 1859.

Government offices
Preceded by Hugh Childers	Auditor-General of Victoria; 1853 – 1855	Succeeded by Hugh Childers
Victorian Legislative Council
Preceded by Hugh Childers	Nominated member 1853 – 1856	Original; Council abolished
