= David Grimes (physician) =

American physician and abortion provider (born 1947)

David Alan Grimes (born February 18, 1947) is an American physician and abortion provider who is certified in both obstetrics and gynecology and in preventive medicine. He is known for his research into abortion.

== Education ==
Grimes received his undergraduate degree in biology from Harvard University, after which he attended medical school at the University of North Carolina. He later earned certification from the American Board of Obstetrics and Gynecology, after which he was also certified in Public Health and General Preventive Medicine from the American Board of Preventive Medicine.

== Career ==
Grimes performed his first abortion in 1972. He worked as an epidemiologist at the Centers for Disease Control for nine years, where he also served as the head of the abortion surveillance branch. He is also a former faculty member at the medical schools of Emory University, the University of Southern California, the University of California-San Francisco, and the University of North Carolina, as well as the former vice president for biomedical affairs at Family Health International in North Carolina's Research Triangle Park. He was inducted into the Institute of Medicine in 2007. He retired from the University of North Carolina School of Medicine in 2014, where he was formerly a clinical professor in the department of obstetrics and gynecology.

== Research ==
Grimes has been described as "a leading researcher and abortion provider". In 2012, he co-authored a review article that found that legal abortion was "markedly safer than childbirth".
