= Michael Grimes (scientist) =

Irish scientist

- Born: 29 September 1888; Limerick, Ireland
- Died: 13 February 1977 (aged 88)
- Occupation: Scientist

Michael Grimes (1888–1977) was a scientist and researcher from Ireland. He is known for his work in microbiology.

== Early life and politics ==
Grimes was born in Limerick, Ireland, in 1888. In 1905 he began working at the Condensed Milk Company of Ireland as a laboratory technician and analyst. Around the time of the Irish War of Independence, he became a member of the Irish Republican Brotherhood. After his appearance on a leaked British Army list of republican sympathisers in 1919, he was smuggled to Dublin in a milk churn, then transported to Wales in a mailbag. Disguised as a Welsh farmer, he took a train to Southampton, boarding a ship to New York City. In the United States he was helped by a Jesuit priest who arranged for him to attend college in Canada. Grimes was the Godparent and close relative of Edward M. Walsh, Founding President of the University of Limerick.

== Education ==
Grimes undertook his undergraduate education in Canada, obtaining an Associate Diploma in Agriculture at the Ontario Agricultural College in 1920, followed by a BA in Chemistry and Bacteriology at the University of Toronto in 1921. He then attended Iowa State College of Agriculture and Mechanic Arts, completing a Master of Science degree in Dairy Bacteriology in 1922 and a PhD in the same field in 1923.

== Career ==
In 1924, University College Cork (UCC) appointed Grimes as agricultural bacteriologist, the first microbiologist employed at the university. He was elected as a member of the Royal Irish Academy in 1931. In 1940, he was appointed professor in the Department of Dairy Bacteriology, which later became the UCC School of Microbiology. He held his professorship until 1961. In 1945, Grimes served as honorary treasurer of the Cork Historical and Archaeological Society. On 13 April 2018, UCC formally opened the Michael Grimes Laboratory. UCC awards an annual student prize in his honour.

== World War II ==
During his time in Iowa, Grimes worked with a German scientist who later took up a post at Heidelberg University in Germany. They continued their joint research, with Grimes visiting Germany on several occasions. In 1935, Grimes and his wife was invited to an SS dinner by his German colleague. Adolf Hitler was guest of honour at the meal and spoke about his intention to invade Abyssinia. Grimes contacted the US Ambassador to Ireland and visited London to inform the British Prime Minister, Ramsay MacDonald. According to Grimes's family, he had been approached by a representative of Hitler in 1940, offering him the position of Governor of Munster in the event of a German invasion of Ireland, a plan known as Operation Green. Grimes's father informed the Garda Síochána immediately.

== Death ==
Grimes died on 13 February 1977 at the age of 88.
