= Paul Grimes (criminal) =

British criminal (born 1950)

Paul Grimes (born 26 May 1950) is an English former gangster who, from an early age, was active in Liverpool's criminal underworld. He has 38 criminal convictions and was involved in a range of violent and illegal activities. He also set up legal businesses recycling scrap metal and disposing of waste. He was rich, successful and at the top of the gangster hierarchy when his son Jason died of a heroin overdose in 1992, at the age of 21. This tragedy led to Grimes becoming a police informer with the aim of bringing down the drug dealers who he felt had destroyed his son's life. His evidence has led to successful prosecutions against high-profile dealers such as John Haase and Curtis Warren. The information Grimes provided also led to his son Heath being jailed for five years.

Grimes is now part of a witness protection program. He has survived six assassination attempts and has a £100,000 bounty on his head.

The book Powder Wars by Graham Johnson offers insight into Paul Grimes' life as first criminal and then supergrass.
