= Stop-Time =

1967 memoir by Frank Conroy

- Author: Frank Conroy
- Genre: Memoir
- Publisher: Viking Press
- Publication date: 1967

Stop-Time is a 1967 memoir by American author Frank Conroy (1936–2005) that tells the story of his poor childhood and early adulthood, growing up in New York City and Florida. Focusing on a series of moments from his life, the book uses traditional fictional devices, while also delving deeply into the author's psyche. The book established Conroy's reputation as a writer. In his review, Norman Mailer wrote, "Stop-Time is unique, an autobiography with the intimate unprotected candor of a novel. What makes it special, however, is the style, dry as an etching, sparse, elegant, modest, cheerful. Conroy has that subtle sense of the proportion of things which one usually finds only in established writers just after the mellowing of their career." Critic Michael Dirda wrote, "In a 2002 issue of The Week magazine the critic James Atlas calls Frank Conroy's 'Stop-Time' the 'best book ever written on what it's like to be a boy growing up in postwar America.'" Another reviewer found that the book "almost offhandedly evoked the vacuity of ordinary America in the 40's and 50's."

Many younger writers have cited Stop-Time as an important influence on their writing careers including David Foster Wallace. Conroy published his second book, Midair, a collection of short stories, 18 years later, and subsequently wrote three other books.
