= Kevin Grimes (ice hockey) =

Canadian ice hockey player (born 1979)

- Born: August 19, 1979 (age 46) Ottawa, Ontario, Canada
- Height: 6 ft 2 in (188 cm)
- Weight: 220 lb (100 kg; 15 st 10 lb)
- Position: Defence
- Shot: Left
- Played for: Grand Rapids Griffins
- NHL draft: 26th overall, 1997; Colorado Avalanche
- Playing career: 1999–2004

Kevin Grimes (born August 19, 1979) is a Canadian former professional ice hockey player who played in the ECHL and International Hockey League. He was drafted in the first round of the 1997 NHL entry draft by the Colorado Avalanche.

== Early life ==
Grimes was born in Ottawa. He played his junior hockey with the Kingston Frontenacs of the OHL from 1996–1999, appearing in 175 games, recording 67 points (8G-59A). In 18 post-season games, Grimes scored six points (2G-4A).

== Career ==
Grimes was drafted by the Colorado Avalanche in the 1997 NHL entry draft in the first round, 26th overall. Despite being a first-round selection, he never played a game in the NHL. Grimes signed a multi-year contract with the Ottawa Senators on August 24, 1999.

Grimes played the 1999–2000 season with the Pee Dee Pride of the ECHL, recording three points (1G-2A) in 41 games, and he played 4 games with the Grand Rapids Griffins of the IHL, getting no points. In 2000–01, Grimes played five games with the Griffins, getting no points, and spent 52 games with the Mobile Mysticks of the ECHL, scoring two points (0G-2A). He played eight playoff games with Mobile, earning an assist. Grimes returned to Mobile for the 2001–02 season, earning nine points (2G-7A) in 64 games.

Grimes then moved over to the Jackson Bandits of the ECHL in 2002–03, playing in 20 games, and getting six points (1G-5A) before being traded to the Greensboro Generals, where he got 8 points (1G-7A) in 54 games, for a total of 14 points (2G-12A) in 74 games. He then played in eight playoff games for Greensboro, scoring two goals. Grimes returned to Greensboro in 2003–04, getting six points (2G-4A) in 55 games. He has since retired from the game.

== Career statistics ==
			Regular season					Playoffs
Season	Team	League	GP	G	A	Pts	PIM	GP	G	A	Pts	PIM
1995–96	Cumberland Grads	CJHL	51	2	10	12	220	—	—	—	—	—
1996–97	Kingston Frontenacs	OHL	57	2	12	14	188	1	0	0	0	0
1997–98	Kingston Frontenacs	OHL	62	1	27	28	179	12	0	1	1	16
1998–99	Kingston Frontenacs	OHL	56	5	20	25	184	5	2	3	5	12
1999–00	Pee Dee Pride	ECHL	41	1	2	3	87	—	—	—	—	—
1999–00	Grand Rapids Griffins	IHL	4	0	0	0	13	—	—	—	—	—
2000–01	Mobile Mysticks	ECHL	52	0	2	2	255	8	0	1	1	32
2000–01	Grand Rapids Griffins	IHL	5	0	0	0	4	—	—	—	—	—
2001–02	Mobile Mysticks	ECHL	64	2	7	9	134	—	—	—	—	—
2002–03	Jackson Bandits	ECHL	20	1	5	6	64	—	—	—	—	—
2002–03	Greensboro Generals	ECHL	54	1	7	8	141	8	2	0	2	27
2003–04	Greensboro Generals	ECHL	52	2	4	6	166	—	—	—	—	—
ECHL totals			286	7	27	34	847	16	2	1	3	59

Awards and achievements
Preceded by Peter Ratchuk	Colorado Avalanche first-round draft pick 1997	Succeeded by Alex Tanguay
