= Elizabeth A. Grimes =

American judge

Associate Justice of the California Court of Appeal, Second District, Division 8
- Incumbent
- Assumed office April 2010
- Preceded by: Tricia A. Bigelow

Judge of the Los Angeles County Superior Court

Personal details
- Born: 1954 (age 71–72)
- Education: Mount Holyoke College, University of Texas at Austin (BA), Stanford Law School (JD)
- Occupation: Judge, lawyer

Elizabeth Annette "Beth" Grimes (born 1954) is a retired Associate Justice of the California Second District Court of Appeal, Division Eight, having been appointed to the post by Republican Governor Arnold Schwarzenegger in 2010.

== Education and legal career ==
After attending Mount Holyoke College for one year, she transferred to the University of Texas at Austin, where she earned her bachelor's degree with Phi Beta Kappa honors. Grimes then earned her Juris Doctor from Stanford Law School in 1980 after serving as one of the Associate Editors of the Stanford Law Review.

Upon graduating from Stanford, Grimes joined the law firm of Gibson, Dunn & Crutcher. After eight years as an associate, she was promoted to be a partner in business litigation at the firm, serving in that capacity for ten years.

== Judge of the Los Angeles County Superior Court ==
After eighteen years in the private sector at Gibson, Dunn & Crutcher, Republican Governor Pete Wilson appointed Grimes as a Judge of the Los Angeles County Superior Court. She served on that court's Executive Committee, Research Attorneys Committee, Media Committee, Bench Bar Committee, and ADR Committee.

During her time on the Superior Court, she served as the judge in various lawsuits involving actors, agents, and others in the entertainment industry. In 2008, Grimes dismissed a paparazzo's civil claim for punitive damages against actor Keanu Reeves after the paparazzo was injured when Reeves drove his car out of a parking space. Later that year, she presided over a court case where the jury awarded a tow truck driver $5,000 in damages after he was assaulted by Laguna Beach: The Real Orange County star Jason Wahler.

In 2009, she ordered actor Jon Voight and his manager's parents to pay US$100,000 in attorney's fees to a pair of New Zealand producers after the trio filed an unsuccessful malicious prosecution lawsuit against the producers. The producers had previously sued Voight and his manager's parents for fraud and breach of contract.

In 2010, Grimes dismissed a lawsuit against Hollywood agent Ari Emanuel and his William Morris Endeavor Agency after the William Morris Agency's former reality television chief John Ferriter launched a lawsuit over various contractual violations and defamation related to the merger of the Endeavor Agency and the William Morris Agency.

Outside of Hollywood-related cases, one of Grimes's final actions as a trial court judge was to dismiss a woman's lawsuit against a medical product manufacturer after the woman claimed that a medical camera fell with "crushing force" upon her knees. The woman had claimed that the manufacturer had created a defective product, been negligent, and committed a breach of contract, but an appellate court later ruled that Grimes was correct in dismissing the suit since the woman had no evidence supporting her claims against the company.

== Associate Justice of the California Court of Appeal ==
In February 2010, Governor Arnold Schwarzenegger appointed Grimes as an Associate Justice of the California Second District Court of Appeal, Division Eight, to replace Justice Tricia A. Bigelow, who had been appointed the Court's Presiding Justice. Grimes was confirmed two months later.

In the November 2010 elections, 72.5 percent of voters supported retaining Grimes as an associate justice of the Court of Appeal.

== Civic activities ==
Grimes was a member of the board of directors of both the Los Angeles and Inland Empire chapters of Big Brothers Big Sisters. She was also a member of the Stanford Law School Board of Visitors and also served as co-chair of the Stanford Law Society of Los Angeles.

Legal offices
Preceded by Tricia A. Bigelow	Associate Justice of the California; Second District Court of Appeal; Division Eight; April 5, 2010–present	Incumbent
