= James Grimes (soccer) =

Canadian soccer player (born 1968)

Personal information
- Full name: James Matthew Grimes
- Date of birth: 26 March 1968 (age 58)
- Place of birth: London, England
- Position: Striker

Youth career
- Malmesbury School
- Chinguacousy FC

College career
Years	Team	Apps	(Gls)
1988–1989	Clemson Tigers		

Senior career*
Years	Team	Apps	(Gls)
1987	North York Rockets	0	(0)
1990	Toronto Blizzard	9	(2)
1990	Hamilton Steelers	8	(0)

International career
1988	Canada	5	(1)
- * Club domestic league appearances and goals

James Grimes (born 26 March 1968) is a Canadian former international soccer player who played as a striker.

He began playing soccer Malmesbury School in Wiltshire, England when he was 9. He moved from Wiltshire to Bramalea, Ontario, Canada when he was 10, with his first youth club in Canada being Chinguacousy FC. He played for the Hamilton Steelers and Toronto Blizzard of the Canadian Soccer League in 1990.

On 28 March 1986, two days after his 18th birthday, he scored a goal against San Marino during a friendly game, becoming Canada's youngest goalscorer. This record stood until 7 July 2017, when Alphonso Davies scored against French Guiana aged 16.
