= Michael Grimes (investment banker) =

American investment banker

Michael David Grimes

Executive Director of the United States Investment Accelerator
- In office March 31, 2025 – February 2026
- President: Donald Trump
- Secretary: Howard Lutnick
- Preceded by: Position established

Personal details
- Born: November 25, 1966 (age 59) Los Angeles, California
- Spouse: Janelle Grimes (nee Okulski)
- Children: Jeffrey Grimes
- Parent(s): David Franklin Grimes, Diane Grimes
- Education: University of California, Berkeley

Michael David Grimes (born November 25, 1966) is an American investment banker and a former senior official at the United States Department of Commerce. He was previously Managing Director and Co-Head of Global Technology Investment Banking at Morgan Stanley. In February 2026, he returned to Morgan Stanley as its chair of investment banking after a year working in the United States Department of Commerce.

== Biography ==
=== Early life and education ===
Michael Grimes attended Polytechnic School in Pasadena, California and the University of California, Berkeley, where he received a degree in Electrical Engineering and Computer Sciences. He interned as a communications systems engineer at Hughes Aircraft Company in the Space and Communications Group in 1985 and as an information systems engineer at Pacific Bell in 1986 and was a software programmer and consultant at Grimes Surveying & Mapping Inc. (his father's company).

=== Career ===
Upon graduation in 1987, Grimes joined Salomon Brothers (now part of Citigroup) in technology investment banking, and in 1992, he joined Bear Stearns as a Vice President in technology banking. In 1995, Grimes was recruited by Frank Quattrone to join Morgan Stanley as a Vice President in their Menlo Park office, focused on technology banking. In April 1996, Quattrone and a number of deputies departed for Deutsche Morgan Grenfell, leaving Grimes to stay at Morgan Stanley. Grimes then worked under Cordell Spencer and Dhiren Shah over the next few years and helped rebuild the West Coast Technology Investment Banking business. In 2005, Grimes and Paul Chamberlain were elevated to Co-Heads of Global Technology Banking.

Michael Grimes has been involved with hundreds of technology investment banking transactions aggregating over $100 billion in value, including a number of high-profile initial public offerings, mergers and acquisitions, equity and debt financings. Most notable were Facebook's $16 billion IPO, and Google’s $1.9 billion IPO, completed with an auction format. Grimes has also been involved with technology M&A transactions such as Seagate Technology's $20.5 billion 3-way merger and spinoff transaction with Veritas Software, Silver Lake Partners and Texas Pacific Group, Hewlett-Packard's $13.6 billion split-up into HP and Agilent (at the time the Agilent IPO was the largest initial public offering in Silicon Valley history), Oracle’s $5.8 billion acquisition of Siebel Systems.

Grimes returned to Morgan Stanley in February 2026, taking on the role of chairman of investment banking after his time as a senior adviser at the U.S. Department of Commerce.

=== United States Department of Commerce ===
Grimes serves at the United States Department of Commerce under president Donald Trump's second term.

Grimes reportedly asked federal employees at the CHIPS Program Office to produce IQ scores or SAT test results to demonstrate their intellect. He also presented them with math problems.

== Recognition ==
In 2002, Grimes was first named to Forbes’ Midas List of the top dealmakers in technology and life sciences venture capital and investment banking, debuting as the second ranked investment banker and eighteenth overall; Grimes has been the top ranked investment banker on the Midas list in 2004, 2005, 2006, and 2007, and the second ranked technology investment banker in 2008. In July 2010, Grimes was named to Fortune’s "50 Smartest People In Tech."

Grimes has also been named by AlwaysOn to their “Power List” of technology dealmakers, Institutional Investor’s November 2006 “40 under 40” list of investment bankers who represent “the way Wall Street is evolving today”, the New York Times “Facebook of Wall Street’s future”, Dealmaker magazine’s “Top 50 Rainmakers”.
