= John Grimes (baseball) =

American baseball player (1869–1964)

- Pitcher
- Born: April 17, 1869; Woodstock, Maryland, U.S.
- Died: January 17, 1964 (aged 94); San Francisco, California, U.S.
- Batted: Right Threw: Right

MLB debut
- July 28, 1897, for the St. Louis Browns

Last MLB appearance
- August 2, 1897, for the St. Louis Browns

MLB statistics
- Win–loss record: 0–2
- Strikeouts: 4
- Earned run average: 5.95
- Stats at Baseball Reference

Teams
- St. Louis Browns (1897)

John Thomas Grimes (April 17, 1869 – January 17, 1964) was an American professional baseball player who played in three games for the St. Louis Browns during the 1897 season. He was born in Baltimore, Maryland and died in San Francisco at the age of 94. At the time of his death, he was the oldest living former major league player. On the 31st of July, Grimes hit six St Louis Browns hitters, setting a National League record that still stands today. John Grimes never pitched professionally again.

Records
Preceded by William Kinsler	Oldest recognized verified living baseball player August 10, 1963 – January 17, 1964	Succeeded by John Hollison
